= List of railroad lines in the Delmarva Peninsula =

This is a list of all freight railroad (not streetcar or rapid transit) lines that have been built in the Delmarva Peninsula south of the Philadelphia, Wilmington and Baltimore Railroad, and does not deal with ownership changes from one company to another. The lines are named by the first company to build them. Unless noted, each railroad eventually became part of the Pennsylvania Railroad system.

Name	From	To	Notes	Opened
Baltimore and Eastern Shore Railroad	Salisbury	Claiborne		1890
Breakwater and Frankford Railroad	Georgetown	Delaware/Maryland state line		1874
Cape Charles Railroad	Cape Junction	Townsend		1910
Cape Charles Railroad	Townsend	Kiptopeke		1912
Delaware Railroad	Rodney	Seaford		ca. 1856
Delaware Railroad	Seaford	Delaware/Maryland state line		1859
Delaware Railroad	Seaford	Delaware/Maryland state line	Dorchester Branch	ca. 1868
Delaware Railroad	Clayton	Smyrna	Smyrna Branch	1866
Delaware Railroad	Townsend	Massey	Townsend Branch	ca. 1869
Delaware and Pennsylvania Railroad	Newark	Delaware City		ca. 1873
Dorchester and Delaware Railroad	Delaware/Maryland state line	Cambridge		ca. 1869
Eastern Shore Railroad	Delaware/Maryland state line	Salisbury		1860
Eastern Shore Railroad	Salisbury	Crisfield		1866
Junction and Breakwater Railroad	Harrington	Lewes		ca. 1869
Junction and Breakwater Railroad	Lewes	Rehoboth Beach		1878
Kent County Rail Road	Delaware/Maryland state line	Massey	Abandoned 1902 upon acquisition by PRR	1873
Kent County Rail Road	Massey	Kennedyville		1870
Kent County Rail Road	Kennedyville	Chestertown		1872
Kent County Rail Road	Chestertown	Parsons	Branch abandoned in 1873 (never part of PRR)	1872
Kent County Rail Road	Worton	Parsons	Branch abandoned in 1910	1873
Kent County Rail Road	Parsons	Nicholson	Branch abandoned in 1910	1877
Maryland and Delaware Railroad	Clayton	Oxford		ca. 1870
New Castle and Frenchtown Turnpike and Rail Road	New Castle	Old Frenchtown Wharf	Abandoned west of Rodney in 1859	1831
New Castle and Wilmington Railroad	Wilmington	New Castle		ca. 1852
New York, Philadelphia and Norfolk Railroad	Pocomoke	Cape Charles		ca. 1885
Philadelphia, Wilmington and Baltimore Railroad	south of Wilmington	New Castle	New Castle Cut-Off	ca. 1888
Queen Anne's Railroad	Lewes	Love Point		ca. 1902
Queen Anne's Railroad	Queenstown	Centreville	Centreville Branch	ca. 1902
Queen Anne and Kent Railroad	Massey	Centreville		1869
Smyrna and Delaware Bay Railroad	Pierson's Cove	Delaware/Maryland state line	Abandoned 1902 upon acquisition by PRR	1873
Wicomico and Pocomoke Railroad	Salisbury	Berlin		1868
Wicomico and Pocomoke Railroad	Berlin	Ocean City		1876
Worcester Rail Road	Delaware/Maryland state line	Franklin City		1876
Worcester and Somerset Railroad	Kings Creek	Pocomoke		ca. 1873

== See also ==
- List of Delaware railroads
- List of Maryland railroads
- List of Virginia railroads
