= List of Delaware railroads =

The following railroads operate in the U.S. state of Delaware.

== Common freight carriers ==
- Conrail Shared Assets Operations
- CSX Transportation (CSXT)
- Delmarva Central Railroad (DCR)
- East Penn Railroad (ESPN)
- Maryland and Delaware Railroad (MDDE)
- Norfolk Southern Railway (NS)
- Wilmington and Western Railroad (WWRC)
- Lehigh Eastern RailRoad (LHEN)

== Passenger carriers ==
- Amtrak (AMTK)
- SEPTA: Wilmington/Newark Line
- Wilmington and Western Railroad (WWRC)
- Delaware Valley RailRoad (DVRR)

== Defunct railroads ==
Name	Mark	System (Note: This is one or more of the Class I railroads that the railroad became part of, if any.)	From	To	Successor	Notes
Baltimore and Delaware Bay Railroad		PRR	1881	1902	Delaware Railroad	
Baltimore and Ohio Railroad	B&O, BO	B&O	1886	1987	Chesapeake and Ohio Railway	
Baltimore and Philadelphia Railroad		B&O	1883	1989	CSX Transportation	
Brandywine Valley Railroad	BVRY		1999	2005	East Penn Railways	
Breakwater and Frankford Railroad		PRR	1873	1883	Delaware, Maryland and Virginia Railroad	
Cambridge and Seaford Railroad		PRR	1882	1899	Delaware Railroad	
Chesapeake and Ohio Railway	CO		1987	1987	CSX Transportation	
Consolidated Rail Corporation	CR		1976	1999	CSX Transportation, Norfolk Southern Railway	
Delaware Railroad		PRR	1836	1976	Consolidated Rail Corporation	
Delaware and Chesapeake Railway		PRR	1877	1899	Delaware Railroad	
Delaware and Chester County Railroad		B&O	1867	1869	Wilmington and Western Railroad	
Delaware, Maryland and Virginia Railroad		PRR	1883	1956	Philadelphia, Baltimore and Washington Railroad	
Delaware and Pennsylvania Railroad		PRR	1857	1873	Pennsylvania and Delaware Railway	
Delaware and Pennsylvania State Line Railroad		RDG	1865	1866	Wilmington and Reading Railroad	
Delaware Coast Line Railroad	DCLR		1982	2018	Delmarva Central Railroad	
Delaware Valley Railway	DV		1994	1999	Brandywine Valley Railroad	
Delaware Western Railroad		B&O	1877	1883	Baltimore and Philadelphia Railroad	
Dorchester and Delaware Railroad		PRR	1867	1883	Cambridge and Seaford Railroad	
East Penn Railways	EPRY		2005	2007	East Penn Railroad	
Junction and Breakwater Railroad		PRR	1857	1883	Delaware, Maryland and Virginia Railroad	
Kent County and Delaware Bay Railroad						
Lewes and Millsboro Railroad		PRR	1835	1873	Breakwater and Frankford Railroad	
Maryland and Delaware Railroad		PRR	1857	1877	Delaware and Chesapeake Railway	
Maryland and Delaware Coast Railway		PRR	1924	1932	Maryland and Delaware Seacoast Railroad	
Maryland and Delaware Seacoast Railroad		PRR	1932	1935	Delaware, Maryland and Virginia Railroad	
Maryland, Delaware and Virginia Railroad		PRR	1905	1905	Maryland, Delaware and Virginia Railway	
Maryland, Delaware and Virginia Railway		PRR	1905	1923	Maryland and Delaware Coast Railway	
New Castle and Frenchtown Turnpike and Railroad Company		PRR	1828	1877	Philadelphia, Wilmington and Baltimore Railroad	
New Castle Turnpike and Railroad Company		PRR	1829	1830	New Castle and Frenchtown Turnpike and Railroad Company	
New Castle and Wilmington Railroad		PRR	1839	1877	Philadelphia, Wilmington and Baltimore Railroad	
Newark and Delaware City Railroad		PRR	1880	1881	Pomeroy and Newark Railroad	
Octoraro Railway	OCTR		1977	1994	Delaware Valley Railway	
Penn Central Transportation Company	PC		1968	1976	Consolidated Rail Corporation	
Pennsylvania Railroad	PRR	PRR	1918	1968	Penn Central Transportation Company	
Pennsylvania and Delaware Railway		PRR	1873	1879	Newark and Delaware City Railroad	
Philadelphia, Baltimore and Washington Railroad		PRR	1902	1976	Consolidated Rail Corporation	
Philadelphia and Reading Railway	P&R	RDG	1900	1924	Reading Company	
Philadelphia, Wilmington and Baltimore Railroad		PRR	1838	1902	Philadelphia, Baltimore and Washington Railroad	
Pomeroy and Newark Railroad		PRR	1881	1917	Philadelphia, Baltimore and Washington Railroad	
Queen Anne's Railroad		PRR	1895	1905	Maryland, Delaware and Virginia Railroad	
Reading Company	RDG	RDG	1924	1976	Consolidated Rail Corporation	
Smyrna and Delaware Bay Railroad		PRR	1865	1902	N/A	
Wilmington and Brandywine Railroad		RDG	1861	1865	Delaware and Pennsylvania State Line Railroad	
Wilmington and Northern Railroad		RDG	1877	1976	Consolidated Rail Corporation	
Wilmington and Reading Railroad		RDG	1866	1876	Wilmington and Northern Railroad	
Wilmington and Susquehanna Railroad		PRR	1832	1838	Philadelphia, Wilmington and Baltimore Railroad	
Wilmington and Western Railroad		B&O	1869	1877	Delaware Western Railroad	

== See also ==
- List of railroad lines in the Delmarva Peninsula
