= List of Maryland railroads =

The following railroads operate in the U.S. state of Maryland.

== Common freight carriers ==
- Canadian Pacific Railway through subsidiary Delaware and Hudson Railway (trackage rights, not used)
- Canton Railroad (CTN)
- CSX Transportation (CSXT)
- Delmarva Central Railroad (DCR)
- Georges Creek Railway (GCK)
- Maryland and Delaware Railroad (MDDE)
- Maryland Midland Railway (MMID)
- Norfolk Southern Railway (NS)
- Tradepoint Rail (TPR)
- Wheeling and Lake Erie Railway (WE)
- Winchester and Western Railroad (WW)

== Passenger carriers ==
- Amtrak (AMTK)
- Baltimore Streetcar Museum
- Maryland Transit Administration for its MARC operations, the Baltimore Metro Subway, the Baltimore Light RailLink, and the Purple Line (under construction)
- National Capital Trolley Museum
- Western Maryland Scenic Railroad
- Walkersville Southern Railroad
- Washington Metro

== Defunct railroads ==
Name	Mark	System (Note: This is one or more of the Class I railroads that the railroad became part of, if any.)	From	To	Successor	Notes
Annapolis and Baltimore Short Line Railroad			1880	1894	Baltimore and Annapolis Short Line Railroad	
Annapolis and Elk Ridge Railroad			1837	1885	Annapolis, Washington and Baltimore Railroad	
Annapolis, Washington and Baltimore Railroad			1886	1908	Washington, Baltimore and Annapolis Electric Railway	
Bachman Valley Railroad			1870	1886	Baltimore and Harrisburg Railway	
Baltimore and Annapolis Railroad	BLA		1935	1993	Canton Railroad	
Baltimore and Annapolis Short Line Railroad			1894	1921	Washington, Baltimore and Annapolis Electric Railroad	
Baltimore Belt Railroad		B&O	1888	1987	CSX Transportation	
Baltimore, Carroll and Frederick Railroad		WM	1852	1853	Western Maryland Railroad	
Baltimore, Chesapeake and Atlantic Railway	BCA	PRR	1894	1928	Baltimore and Eastern Railroad	
Baltimore and Cumberland Railway						
Baltimore and Cumberland Valley Railway		WM	1878	1917	Western Maryland Railway	
Baltimore and Delaware Bay Railroad		PRR	1881	1902	Delaware Railroad	
Baltimore and Delta Railway			1878	1882	Maryland Central Railroad	
Baltimore and Eastern Railroad	BE	PRR	1923	1976	Consolidated Rail Corporation	
Baltimore and Eastern Railroad		PRR	1886	1894	Baltimore, Chesapeake and Atlantic Railway	
Baltimore, Hampden and Towsontown Railway			1874	1878	Baltimore and Delta Railway	
Baltimore and Hanover Railroad		WM	1877	1886	Baltimore and Harrisburg Railway	
Baltimore and Harrisburg Railway		WM	1886	1917	Western Maryland Railway	
Baltimore and Lehigh Railroad			1891	1894	Baltimore and Lehigh Railway	
Baltimore and Lehigh Railway			1894	1901	Maryland and Pennsylvania Railroad	
Baltimore and Ohio Railroad	B&O, BO	B&O	1827	1987	Chesapeake and Ohio Railway	
Baltimore and Ohio Railroad in Pennsylvania		B&O	1912	1980	Baltimore and Ohio Railroad	
Baltimore and Philadelphia Railroad		PRR	1852	1854	Philadelphia and Baltimore Central Railroad	
Baltimore and Port Deposit Railroad		PRR	1832	1838	Philadelphia, Wilmington and Baltimore Railroad	
Baltimore and Potomac Railroad		PRR	1853	1902	Philadelphia, Baltimore and Washington Railroad	
Baltimore and Sparrows Point Railroad		PRR	1887	1919	Philadelphia, Baltimore and Washington Railroad	
Baltimore and Susquehanna Railroad		PRR	1828	1854	Northern Central Railway	
Baltimore and Swann Lake Passenger Railway			1868	1874	Baltimore, Hampden and Towsontown Railway	
Baltimore, Towsontown, Dulaney's Valley and Delta Narrow Gauge Railway			1876	1878	Baltimore and Delta Railway	
Bay Coast Railroad	BCR		2006	2018	Delmarva Central Railroad	
Bay Ridge and Annapolis Railroad		B&O	1886	1903	N/A	
Cambridge and Seaford Railroad		PRR	1882	1899	Delaware Railroad	
Caton and Loudon Railway		PRR	1945	1973	N/A	
Catonsville Short Line Railroad		PRR	1882	1945	Caton and Loudon Railway	
Central Railroad of Maryland		PRR	1913	1914	York, Hanover and Frederick Railway Company	
Chaffee Railroad		WM	1918	1950	Western Maryland Railway	
Chambersburg, Greencastle and Hagerstown Railroad		PRR	1853	1859	Franklin Railroad	
Chesapeake Railroad	CHRR		1995	2000	N/A	
Chesapeake Beach Railway			1896	1935	East Washington Railway	
Chesapeake and Curtis Bay Railroad		WM	1916	1989	CSX Transportation	
Chesapeake and Ohio Railway	CO		1987	1987	CSX Transportation	
Columbia and Port Deposit Railroad		PRR	1858	1890	Port Deposit Railroad	
Columbia and Port Deposit Railway		PRR	1890	1916	Philadelphia, Baltimore and Washington Railroad	
Confluence and Oakland Railroad		B&O	1890	1941	N/A	
Consolidated Rail Corporation	CR		1976	1999	CSX Transportation, Norfolk Southern Railway	
Cumberland and Pennsylvania Railroad	C&PA, CPA	WM	1850	1953	Western Maryland Railway	
Cumberland Valley Railroad		PRR	1860	1919	Pennsylvania Railroad	
Curtis Bay Railroad	CURB	B&O	1915	1987	CSX Transportation	
Delaware Railroad		PRR	1867	1976	Consolidated Rail Corporation	
Delaware and Chesapeake Railway		PRR	1878	1899	Delaware Railroad	
Delaware Coast Line Railroad	DCLR		1982	1994	Maryland and Delaware Railroad	
Delaware and Maryland Railroad		PRR	1832	1836	Wilmington and Susquehanna Railroad	
Delaware, Maryland and Virginia Railroad		PRR	1883	1956	Philadelphia, Baltimore and Washington Railroad	
Dorchester and Delaware Railroad		PRR	1866	1883	Cambridge and Seaford Railroad	
East Washington Railway			1935	1976	N/A	
Eastern Shore Railroad	ESHR		1981	2006	Bay Coast Railroad	
Eastern Shore Railroad (1836–1884)		PRR	1836	1884	New York, Philadelphia and Norfolk Railroad	
Elkton and Middletown Railroad		PRR	1880	1916	Philadelphia, Baltimore and Washington Railroad	
Emmitsburg Railroad			1868	1940	N/A	
Franklin Railroad	PRR		1859	1865	Cumberland Valley Railroad	
Franklin Railroad		PRR	1837	1850	Chambersburg, Greencastle and Hagerstown Railroad	
Frederick and Northern Railroad Company		PRR	1896	1897	Hanover and York Railroad Company	
Frederick and Pennsylvania Line Railroad Company (F&PL)		PRR	1867	1896	Frederick and Northern Railroad Company	
George's Creek and Cumberland Railroad		WM	1876	1917	Western Maryland Railway	
Green Ridge Railroad			1883	1891	N/A	Operated as a private carrier 1891-94
Hagerstown and State Line Railroad		WM	1884	1899	Washington and Franklin Railway	
Kent County Railroad		PRR	1856	1877	Baltimore and Delaware Bay Railroad	
Lancaster, Cecil and Southern Railroad		B&O	1892	1987	CSX Transportation	
Maryland Central Railroad			1867	1888	Maryland Central Railway	
Maryland Central Railway			1888	1891	Baltimore and Lehigh Railroad	
Maryland and Delaware Railroad		PRR	1854	1877	Delaware and Chesapeake Railway	
Maryland and Delaware Coast Railway		PRR	1924	1932	Maryland and Delaware Seacoast Railroad	
Maryland and Delaware Seacoast Railroad		PRR	1932	1935	Baltimore and Eastern Railroad	
Maryland, Delaware and Virginia Railroad		PRR	1905	1905	Maryland, Delaware and Virginia Railway	
Maryland, Delaware and Virginia Railway	MDV	PRR	1905	1923	Baltimore and Eastern Railroad, Maryland and Delaware Coast Railway	
Maryland and Pennsylvania Railroad	M&PA, MPA		1901	1985	N/A	
Maryland and Pennsylvania Terminal Railway			1905	1985	N/A	
Metropolitan Railroad (Maryland)			1853	1863	N/A	Following the 1863 bankruptcy, B&O built its Metropolitan Branch along a similar route
Metropolitan Southern Railroad		B&O	1890	1987	CSX Transportation	
New Castle and Frenchtown Turnpike and Railroad Company		PRR	1828	1859	N/A	
New York, Philadelphia and Norfolk Railroad		PRR	1882	1958	Penndel Company	
Norfolk and Western Railroad		N&W	1881	1896	Norfolk and Western Railway	
Norfolk and Western Railway	N&W, NW	N&W	1896	1998	Norfolk Southern Railway	
Northern Central Railway		PRR	1854	1976	Consolidated Rail Corporation	
Peninsula Railroad		PRR	1880	1882	New York, Philadelphia and Norfolk Railroad	
Penn Central Transportation Company	PC		1968	1976	Consolidated Rail Corporation	
Penndel Company		PRR	1954	1976	Consolidated Rail Corporation	
Pennsylvania Railroad	PRR	PRR	1876	1968	Penn Central Transportation Company	
Pennsylvania Railroad in Maryland			1876	1888	George's Creek and Cumberland Railroad	
Philadelphia and Baltimore Central Railroad		PRR	1854	1916	Philadelphia, Baltimore and Washington Railroad	
Philadelphia, Baltimore and Washington Railroad		PRR	1902	1976	Consolidated Rail Corporation	
Philadelphia, Wilmington and Baltimore Railroad		PRR	1838	1902	Philadelphia, Baltimore and Washington Railroad	
Piedmont and Cumberland Railway		WM	1886	1905	Western Maryland Railroad	
Pittsburgh and Connellsville Railroad		B&O	1837	1912	Baltimore and Ohio Railroad in Pennsylvania	
Port Deposit Railroad		PRR	1890	1890	Columbia and Port Deposit Railway	
Potomac Valley Railroad		WM	1890	1905	Western Maryland Railroad	
Preston Railroad			1897	1960	N/A	
Queen Anne's Railroad		PRR	1894	1905	Maryland, Delaware and Virginia Railroad	
Queen Anne's and Kent Railroad		PRR	1856	1899	Delaware Railroad	
Shenandoah Valley Railroad		N&W	1870	1890	Shenandoah Valley Railway	
Shenandoah Valley Railway		N&W	1890	1890	Norfolk and Western Railroad	
Smyrna and Delaware Bay Railroad		PRR	1865	1902	N/A (owned by Baltimore and Delaware Bay Railroad)	
Southern Maryland Railroad			1868	1886	Washington and Potomac Railroad	
State Line and Oakland Railroad		B&O	1889	1890	State Line and Oakland Railway	
State Line and Oakland Railway		B&O	1890	1890	Confluence and Oakland Railroad	
Union Railroad of Baltimore		PRR	1866	1976	Consolidated Rail Corporation	
Virginia and Maryland Railroad	VAMD		1977	1981	Eastern Shore Railroad	
Washington, Brandywine and Point Lookout Railroad			1918	1942	U.S. Navy	
Washington & Chesapeake Beach Railway			1891	1895	Chesapeake Beach Railway	
Washington City and Point Lookout Railroad		B&O	1872	1874	Baltimore and Ohio Railroad	
Washington County Railroad		B&O	1864	1987	CSX Transportation	
Washington and Franklin Railway		WM	1899			Owned by Reading Company and leased to Western Maryland Railway; still exists as a lessor of CSX Transportation, owned by Reading International, Inc.
Washington and Potomac Railroad			1886	1900	Washington, Potomac and Chesapeake Railroad	
Washington, Potomac and Chesapeake Railroad			1901	1910	Washington, Potomac and Chesapeake Railway	
Washington, Potomac and Chesapeake Railway			1910	1918	Washington, Brandywine and Point Lookout Railroad	
West Virginia Central and Pittsburg Railway		WM	1882	1905	Western Maryland Railroad	
Western Maryland Railroad		WM	1853	1909	Western Maryland Railway	
Western Maryland Railway	WM	WM	1909	1989	CSX Transportation	
Western Maryland Tidewater Railroad		WM	1883	1905	Western Maryland Railroad	
Wicomico and Pocomoke Railroad		PRR	1848	1890	Baltimore and Eastern Shore Railroad	
Wilmington and Susquehanna Railroad		PRR	1836	1838	Philadelphia, Wilmington and Baltimore Railroad	
Worcester Railroad		PRR	1853	1883	Delaware, Maryland and Virginia Railroad	
Worcester and Somerset Railroad		PRR	1867	1880	Peninsula Railroad	
Hanover and York Railroad Company		PRR	1897	1914	York, Hanover and Frederick Railway Company	
York, Hanover and Frederick Railway Company		PRR	1914	1954	Penndel Company	

=== Electric railways ===
- Baltimore and Bel Air Electric Railway
- Baltimore, Halethorpe and Elkridge Railway
- Baltimore, Sparrow's Point and Chesapeake Railway
- Blue Ridge Railway
- Capital Traction Company
- City and Suburban Railway
- Cumberland Electric Railway
- Cumberland and Westernport Electric Railway
- Frederick Railroad
- Frederick and Middletown Railroad
- Hagerstown Railway
- Hagerstown and Frederick Railway
- Kensington Railway
- Loraine Electric Railway
- Maryland Electric Railways
- North Beach Railway
- Potomac and Severn Electric Railway: 1899–1900, to Washington and Annapolis Electric Railway
- Towson and Cockeysville Electric Railway; 1912–1924, shuttle between Northern Central's Timonium Station and the Towson Courthouse
- United Railways and Electric Company
- Washington and Annapolis Electric Railway: 1900–1902, to Washington, Baltimore and Annapolis Electric Railway
- Washington, Baltimore and Annapolis Electric Railroad (WB&A): 1911–1935, to Baltimore and Annapolis Railroad
- Washington, Baltimore and Annapolis Electric Railway: 1902–1911, to Washington, Baltimore and Annapolis Electric Railroad
- Washington, Berwyn and Laurel Electric Railway
- Washington Railway and Electric Company
- Washington and Glen Echo Railroad
- Washington and Great Falls Electric Railway
- Washington Interurban Railway
- Washington and Maryland Railway
- Washington and Rockville Railway
- Washington, Spa Spring and Gretta Railway
- Washington, Woodside and Forest Glen Railway and Power Company

=== Private carriers ===
- Eckhart Branch Railroad
- Georges Creek Railroad
- Green Ridge Railroad
- Maryland Mining Company
- Mount Savage Railroad

=== Passenger carriers ===
- Indian Head Central Railway

=== Ghost railroads ===
- Baltimore and Drum Point Railroad

== See also ==
- List of railroad lines in the Delmarva Peninsula
