= Kent County Rail Road =

Kent County Railroad
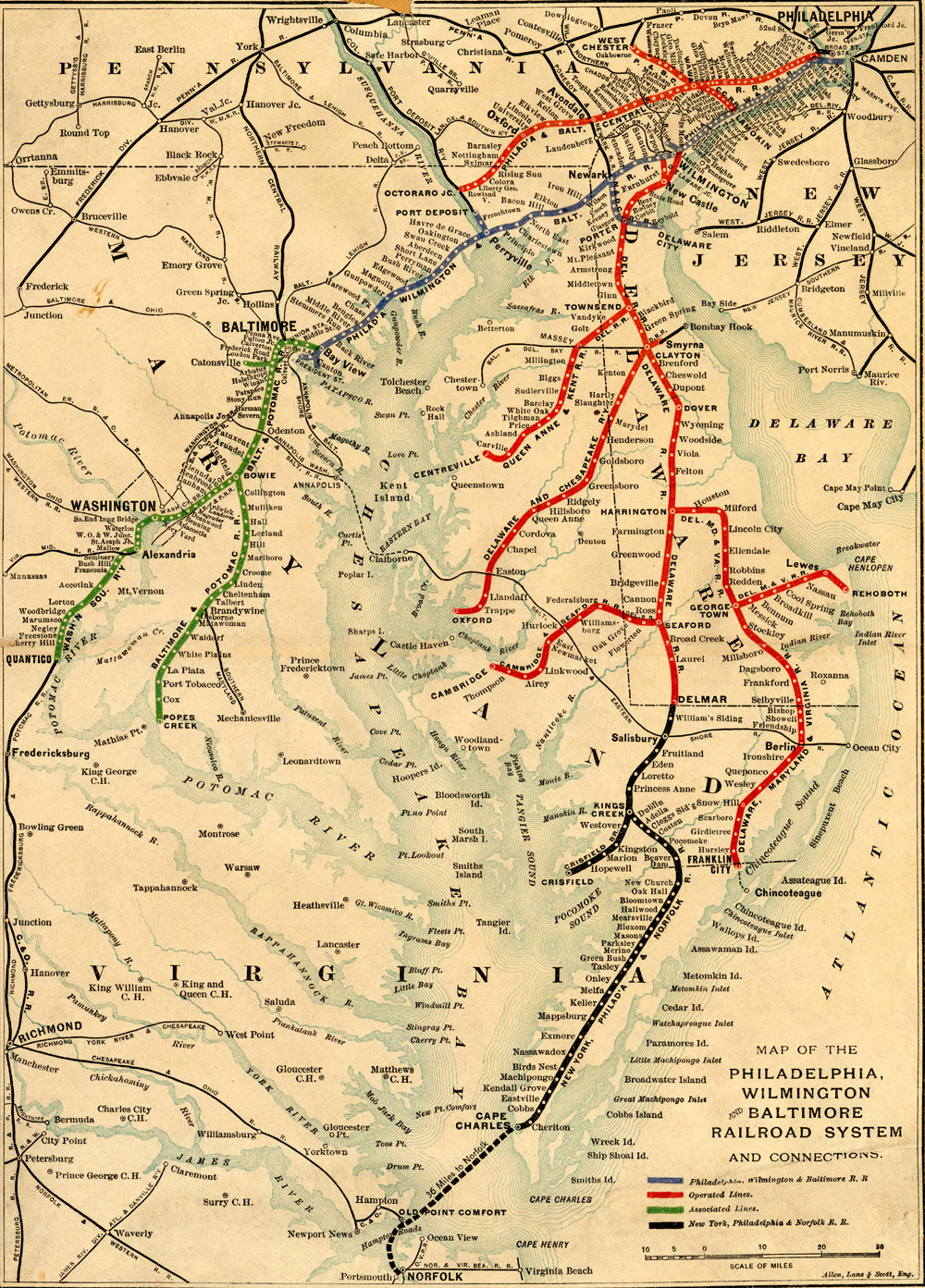
- An early 1890s map of the Philadelphia, Wilmington & Baltimore Railroad showing the Kent County Railroad line

Overview
- Stations called at: Clayton, Delaney's Station, Bingham's station, Massey, Lambson's Station, Black's Station, Kennedyville, Still Pond, Lynch, Worton, Chestertown, Nicholson's Station
- Headquarters: Chestertown
- Founders: George Vickers
- Locale: Kent County, Maryland, Delaware
- Dates of operation: 1870–1883
- Successor: Baltimore and Delaware Bay Railroad

Technical
- Track gauge: 4 ft 8 1/2 in (1,435 mm) standard gauge
- Length: 36 miles (58 kilometres)

The Kent County Railroad (KRR) was a railroad company that operated in the US states of Maryland and Delaware from 1870 to 1883. It first connected to the previously existing Delaware Railroad (DRC) at its branch from Townsend, Delaware to Massey's Crossroads in Kent County, Maryland and ran through Kent County to Chestertown, Maryland. At Massey's Crossroad, later Massey's Station, it also connected to the Queen Anne's and Kent Railroad (QA&KR). In 1873 the company extended the line east to Clayton, Delaware. In 1877 the Kent County was sold at foreclosure and bought by the New Jersey Southern Railroad which, on May 12, 1883, merged it with the Smyrna and Delaware Bay Railroad to form the Baltimore and Delaware Bay Railroad.

== History ==
After several years of advocacy, the KCRR was chartered by the state of Maryland on March 8, 1856. It was charged with building a railroad from the Chesapeake Bay or the Chester River in Kent County east to a point on the north side of the Sassafras River in Cecil County or to a point on the then unbuilt QA&KR, and to build branches within Kent County as desired.

In 1866 there was debate about where to connect the line to existing railroads. Some wanted to build it straight to Elkton, Maryland using an existing grade (from an earlier failed railroad effort) from Elkton to the Bohemia River - to create a Maryland Peninsular Railroad to compete with the line in Delaware. Others wanted it to take a shorter route and connect to Smyrna, Middletown or Townsend on the existing Delaware Railroad. Surveying of the possible routes began in the same year. In 1867 the Maryland legislature decided the issue and ordered the railroad to connect to the DRC via Townsend.

Construction on a branch from the DRC line at Townsend, Delaware to Massey's Crossroads began in 1868 and was completed in the spring of 1869. At the time the intention was to build a line from Massey's Crossroads (where it would connect to the DRC and QA&KR) to Swan Creek in Rock Hall (where a ferry would connect with Baltimore), and with a branch to Chestertown or through it. There were also plans to build the Eastern Shore and Baltimore railroad from Massey to Elkton, to direct Eastern Shore traffic to Baltimore, but that line was never constructed.

Work began on the KCRR line between Massey's Crossroads and Kennedyville in the spring of 1868, but ceased in September due to a lack of funds. Work restarted in April 1869, with the railroad built on "the ridge" and by August of 1869 the line had been graded and rails had been delivered. By mid-December the rails were complete and workers were ballasting the line. By January 1870, the railroad was running regular trains from Massey's to Townsend and some trains were running on the tracks to Kennedyville. Before the railroad opened, the KCRR asked the Baltimore City Council to financially support the line to Rock Hall, believing that it would divert business from Philadelphia to Baltimore, but the Council voted against the idea, preferring to put their money towards a line to Elkton instead.

The line was opened from Massey's Crossroads to Kennedyville in April 1870 and was carrying mail that far by July. It was extended to Worton by August of 1870 and to Chestertown on the Chester River on February 20, 1872. Both a branch from just north of Chestertown west to an area called Parsons (which was intended to go to Rock Hall), and a short extension to the wharf on the Chester River opened on August 1, 1872. Parsons would later be known as Nicholson's, but at times was called Fairlee, Belair or Bellair.

Not long after the line to Chestertown opened, leaders started planning to extend the line to the Chesapeake. A few months after it opened, Maryland granted a charter to the Bay Extension Railway Company to extend the line to Rock Hall.

In 1873, the Vineland Railroad in New Jersey was completed to the Delaware Bay and this created the impetus to extend a line from Woodland Beach/Bombay Hook, Delaware, across Delmarva, to the Chesapeake - an endeavor that would create a new route between New York and Baltimore and which the KCRR became a part of. The KCRR partnered with Jay Gould and the New Jersey Southern Railroad (NJSR). Gould was building a rail line from Bombay Hook on the Delaware Bay to Smyrna called the Smyrna and Delaware Bay Railroad. At the same time the KCRR began work on the line to Rock Hall from Worton and a new line from Massey to Clayton, Delaware which was completed by October of 1873.

In 1874, the western line was extended as far as Nicholson's near the current location of 23570 Earl Nicholson Road. The old line to Nicholson's created a nonsensical dogleg, and most of it was abandoned and then removed when the new line was completed. The rail from the dogleg was sent east to build sidings on the Bombay Hook line. The line was graded nearly the whole way to Tolchester/Herring Pond on the Chesapeake, the new proposed western terminus, but slowed down when it hit marshy land about a mile from Tolchester. Work ceased for the winter but never resumed because the rail line ran out of funding due to the Panic of 1873, which also caused Gould to lose control of the NJSR.

Not only could the railroad not afford to expand, but it couldn't afford to even operate. In April 1874 it failed to make lease payments to the QA&KR for use of the Massey to Townsend rail line, and it lost the right to use that track. In addition to the ongoing national economic collapse, the failure of the peach crop and the harsh winter harmed their business. A few days later the Philadelphia, Wilmington and Baltimore Railroad stopped shipping freight past Massey on the KCRR. In late June the railroad had to stop running trains because the employees, who had not been paid for seven months, went on strike. Mail had to be delivered using a hand car. In July, the line was leased to M.W. Serat, the president of the company. In late December 1874, the KCRR had arranged for the QA&KR to provide service on the line. Service to Nicholson's ended around this time and by 1885 the track was in ruins and overgrown with trees.

On February 15, 1877 the Kent County was sold at foreclosure to Gould, reorganized in February 1878 with Gould as President and then leased to Col. Fred Gerker for $1 per year and operated as part of the NJSR system.

NJSR (by then part of Central Railroad of New Jersey), merged the two companies as the Baltimore and Delaware Bay Railroad on May 12, 1883, however it did not become official until the 1890's. During this time it was sometimes called the Kent County and Smyrna and Delaware Bay Railroad. Despite the failure to extend the line south to Rock Hall, the railroad offered service there, via stage, and to the area of Gershom Hall to the north.

In 1889, the Central of New Jersey sold its interest in the road to Emil Thielens of Philadelphia and it was placed under new management. They committed funds and energy to repairing the line and graded it from Nicholson to Tolchester, but they never extended the track.

== Legacy ==
The line passed through numerous owners over the next 100 years, from the Pennsylvania Railroad, where it was part of the Delaware Railroad system and called the Chestertown Railroad, to Penn Central where it was known as the Chestertown Secondary. The Nicholson Branch was abandoned in 1897.

Following Penn Central's bankruptcy, the United States Railway Association decided not to transfer the line (USRA line 147) to Conrail and it remained with Penn Central. In 1976 Maryland began leasing the line from Penn Central and paid Conrail to continue service. It was expensive, so the next year the state replaced Conrail with the Maryland and Delaware Railroad (MDDE). Service on the half-mile long Strawboard Branch, which provided service to the American Strawboard Company Paper Mill, north of Chestertown along High Street, ceased around this time.

In late 1981 or early 1982, the line, which the MDDE called the Chestertown Line, was purchased by the Maryland Department of Transportation and later transferred to the Maryland Transit Authority. Freight operations into Chestertown ceased in the late 1980s-early 1990s. The rail south of Mary Morris road was removed between 2008 and 2010.

MDDE combined it with the Centreville line into the "Northern Line". The Chestertown line is still in use past Worton, to Mary Morris Road, and almost to Chestertown with the last 3.25 miles having been railbanked or removed. Within Chestertown the right-of-way has been railbanked and converted into the 2.2 mile long Wayne Gilchrest Trail (nee the Chestertown Rail Trail). This includes the line between milepost 18.82 and milepost 20.29, including a 20th-Century extension to the river from High Street, and the Strawboard Branch. There are plans to use the 1.8 miles in between the railbanked portion and the in-use portion to extend the rail-trail. A short bit of the Strawboard Branch track and a bridge over Radcliffe Creek is still in place north of High Street.
