= Jack A. Markell Trail =

Trail in Delaware, United States

Coordinates: 39.6765°N 75.5752°W

- Length: 5.5 miles (8.9 km)
- Location: New Castle County, Delaware
- Established: 2018
- Trailheads: New Castle, Delaware Street, Boulden Boulevard, W. Minuet Drive, Baylor Blvd, DuPont Environmental Education Center of Delaware Nature Society
- Use: Hiking, Biking, Running, Rollerblading
- Surface: Asphalt
- Website: Jack A. Markell Trail

The Jack A. Markell Trail is a 5.5-mile (8.9 km) long, shared-use rail trail/rail-with-trail that runs from New Castle Battery Park to the DuPont Environmental Education Center on the waterfront of Wilmington in Delaware, United States. The trail utilizes the abandoned right of way of the Philadelphia, Wilmington and Baltimore Railroad (formerly the New Castle and Wilmington Railroad), its abandoned spur to the Wilmington Airport and land in the Russel W. Peterson Urban Wildlife Refuge south of the Shellpot Branch railroad. It was built in 3 phases, and with two complementary projects, between 2010 and 2018. The trail connects with the Wilmington Riverwalk (which is sometimes grouped with this trail into one trail), the Peterson Refuge Boardwalk, and the Battery Park Trail. There are plans to connect it to the Newport River Trail and the Commons Boulevard Trail. The trail is named for former Governor Jack Markell.

The trail serves as part of the East Coast Greenway and the September 11th National Memorial Trail.

== History ==
=== railroad ===
Most of the trail, between New Castle, Delaware and Newport, Delaware, is built on the old right of way of the New Castle and Wilmington Railroad (NC&W).

The NC&W railroad line was in use for over 100 years. It was chartered in 1839 to bridge the gap between the Philadelphia, Wilmington and Baltimore Railroad (PW&B) and the PW&B-owned New Castle and Frenchtown Railroad (NC&F). The railroad was opened in 1852 and was operated and at least partially owned by the PW&B, which formally absorbed it on May 15, 1877. In 1881 it, along with the rest of the PW&B, became part of the Pennsylvania Railroad (PRR). In 1891 the NC&W was merged with the NC&F to form the Delaware Branch of the Delaware Railroad, which was all part of the PW&B system within the PRR. It remained part of the PW&B system until that merged with the Baltimore and Potomac on November 1, 1902, to form the Philadelphia, Baltimore and Washington Railroad (PB&W).

After the attack on Pearl Harbor, the United States Army Air Forces took control of the then under-construction New Castle County Airport for military use and at this time the Reading Railroad built a 1.5 mi (2.4 km) branch off of the NC&W track, from a point just north of the current New Jersey Turnpike/I-295, to the airport that served as a trolley and freight line.

The NC&W track and the Airport Branch were part of the PB&W/PRR until 1968, when the PRR merged with the New York Central Railroad to form the Penn Central Railroad. In 1970, the Penn Central declared bankruptcy and on April 1, 1976, Penn Central transferred rail operations of its most viable railroads, including the old NC&W line, to the government-owned Consolidated Rail Corporation (Conrail).

Part of the line, by then known as the New Castle Industrial Track, from Farnhurst, Delaware (where the line crossed US-13) to the Shellpot Secondary was shut down, along with the Airport Branch, on August 30, 1972. The tracks were removed by 1975. While a part of Conrail, the tracks south of Farnhurst were taken out of service in the late 1970's and abandoned in 1984. The "A" bridge span over the Christina River was removed around the same time and the rest of the bridge, below the water line, was removed in 1986, with the bridge completely gone by 1987. The tracks south of Farnhurst were removed in the 1990's. The only remaining section of tracks from the old NC&W are the few hundred feet between the Shellpot Secondary and the Northeast Corridor that makes up part of the West Wilmington Industrial Track.

=== Trail ===
By 2002 the line had come into the ownership of the state of Delaware where it was managed by the Delaware Transit Corporation. In the 1990s Delaware and New Castle County started discussing the possibility of reusing the right of way for a multi-use trail between New Castle and Wilmington, and they later arranged for New Castle to lease it. In 2006, the Delaware Department of Transportation (DelDOT) developed a Statewide Rail-to-Trail and Rail with-Trail Master Facility Plan for potential bicycle and pedestrian use and the New Castle Industrial Track was one of eleven railroad corridors in Delaware that were identified and further evaluated for potential development for trails. In planning documents dating back to 2007 and other sources, it was called the New Castle Industrial Track Trail or just the Industrial Track Trail.

In 2005, prior to construction of the Industrial Track Trail, DelDOT built an 1100-foot long trail called the Heritage Greenway Trail on a section of the right-of-way between Delaware Street/SR-273 and 8th Street in New Castle, a few feet away from the New Castle Secondary (NCS) railroad using federal Transportation Enhancement funding. It was later added to the Industrial Track Trail. The old junction between the Industrial Track and the NCS was used for the New Castle Italian Immigrant Memorial.

Work on the trail began in 2010 with American Recovery and Reinvestment Act funds. Phase I, from Delaware Street/SR-273 in New Castle to just beyond Boulden Boulevard in Farnhurst, including an at-grade crossing of Boulden, was completed in the summer of that year.

New Castle County started work on Phase 2, a 1.2 mi (1.9 km) segment from I-295 to the Christina River, in 2012 and completed it prior to August of 2014.

By August 2014, New Castle had built a trail crossing of Delaware Avenue to connect Phase 1 to the New Castle Heritage Trail.

The gap between the first two phases was not built entirely on the NC&W right-of-way because just prior to 2009 the railroad underpass below the Delaware Turnpike/I-295, which was owned by the Delaware River and Bay Authority (DRBA), was filled in. The gap was closed by running the trail under N Dupont Highway/US-13 in the old rail/Baylor Boulevard underpass and along the NC&W right-of way to I-295. From there, DRBA built the trail along the south side of I-295 to the right-of-way of the old Airport Branch and along the Airport Branch right-of-way through the old rail underpass beneath I-295 (which had to be modified) and to the southern end of Phase 2. The US-13 underpass was modified in 2014-2015 when the bridges over it were replaced and the rest of the gap sections were built in 2014.

A formal groundbreaking on Phase 3, a 1.5 mile section from the south side of the Chirstina River, across it and then parallel to the Shellpot Secondary to the DuPont Environmental Education Center was held in late 2016, at which time the trail name was changed from the Industrial Track Trail to the Jack A. Markell Trail. Work on Phase 3 began in 2017, years after a 2011 feasibility report for it was completed. The Shellpot Secondary originally had two sets of tracks, but one set was removed in the late 80's/early '90s. Planners wanted to use the right-of-way of the 2nd track for the trail, because it would not impact any Refuge or wetland resources and would be cheaper, but Norfolk Southern would not allow it. Work on Phase 3, and thus the last of the trail, was completed in September 2018.

==== Commons Boulevard Trail ====
In 2018, planning began on a trail to be built partially on the old Airport Branch right of way from a point where the Markell Trail stopped using it west to the Social Security Administration office at Creekwood Road and then along Basins Road/US-202/DE-141 and Commons Boulevard/DE-37 to Churchmans Road/DE-58. The first section, along and across Basins Road/US-202/DE-141 was completed in 2020 as part of a larger intersection project. The second section, built on the old railroad right-of-way to Creekway, opened in October of 2023.
