= New Castle and Wilmington Railroad =

Railway company in Delaware

Overview
- Locale: Delaware
- Dates of operation: 1852–1877 (purchased by Philadelphia, Wilmington and Baltimore Railroad)
- Successor: Philadelphia, Wilmington and Baltimore Railroad

Technical
- Length: 5 miles

The New Castle and Wilmington Railroad (NC&W) was an American railroad that operated in Delaware from 1852 to 1877. It was chartered in 1839 to bridge the gap between the Philadelphia, Wilmington and Baltimore Railroad (PW&B) and the PW&B-owned New Castle and Frenchtown Railroad (NC&F). The 5 miles (8.0 km) long line opened in 1852 and was immediately leased by the Philadelphia, Wilmington and Baltimore Railroad (PW&B).

On May 15, 1877, the PW&B was absorbed by the PW&B, and later sold to the Delaware Railroad.

The right-of-way laid down by the NC&W line was mostly converted into the Jack A. Markell Trail but a few hundred feet are still in use and short sections near I-95 and I-295 have been taken for highway use.

== History ==
The NC&W was chartered in 1839 to bridge the gap between the Philadelphia, Wilmington and Baltimore Railroad (PW&B) and the PW&B-owned New Castle and Frenchtown Railroad (NC&F). The railroad opened in 1852 and was immediately leased by the PW&B, thus creating a connection between the PW&B line and the lines into Delaware.

The PW&B formally absorbed the NC&W on May 15, 1877. In 1881 it, along with the rest of the PW&B, became part of the Pennsylvania Railroad (PRR). In 1891 the NC&W was merged with the NC&F to form the Delaware Branch of the Delaware Railroad, which was all part of the PW&B system within the PRR. It remained part of the PW&B system until that merged with the Baltimore and Potomac on November 1, 1902, to form the Philadelphia, Baltimore and Washington Railroad (PB&W).

After the attack on Pearl Harbor, the United States Army Air Forces took control of the then under-construction New Castle County Airport for military use and at this time the Reading Railroad built a 1.5 mi (2.4 km) branch off of the NC&W track, from a point just north of the current New Jersey Turnpike/I-295, to the airport that served as a trolley and freight line.

The NC&W track and the Airport Branch were part of the PB&W/PRR until 1968, when the PRR merged with the New York Central Railroad to form the Penn Central Railroad. In 1970, the Penn Central declared bankruptcy and on April 1, 1976, Penn Central transferred rail operations of its most viable railroads, including the old NC&W line, to the government-owned Consolidated Rail Corporation (Conrail).

Part of the line, by then known as the New Castle Industrial Track, from Farnhurst, Delaware (where the line crossed US-13) to the Shellpot Secondary was shut down, along with the Airport Branch, on August 30, 1972. The tracks were removed by 1975. While a part of Conrail, the tracks south of Farnhurst were taken out of service in the late 1970s and abandoned in 1984. The "A" bridge over the Christina River was removed in 1987. The tracks south of Farnhurst were removed in the 1990s.

== Remnants ==
The bulk of the right-of-way, from the Shellpot Secondary to the New Castle Secondary was used to build the Jack A. Markell Trail which opened in 2018.

The trail diverts from the right-or-way at Delaware Street in New Castle and near the Delaware Turnpike/I-295. Just north of the Delaware Turnpike, Baylor Boulevard utilizes the right-of-way.

The only remaining section of tracks on the old NC&W right-of-way are the few hundred feet between the Shellpot Secondary and the Northeast Corridor that makes up part of the West Wilmington Industrial Track.
