= Nanticoke City, Delaware =

Former unincorporated community in Delaware, United States

Coordinates: 38°38′21″N 75°37′04″W

Nanticoke City was an unincorporated community in western Sussex County, Delaware, United States that existed from 1856 until 1910. The community was laid out by Rev. Thomas B. Bradford, consisting of 100 lots built around the newly opened rail depot of the Delaware Railroad just west of the then town limits of Seaford. Additional lots were added, bringing the community to 179 properties. On October 8, 1907, a storm of reported "near hurricane strength" struck the community, causing injuries and destroying homes. In 1910, the community was formally annexed into the municipal limits of Seaford and is that part of the city west of the railroad tracks, south of Poplar Street, east of Shipley Street, and extending southward to the Nanticoke River and Nanticoke Avenue.
