= Green Ridge Railroad =

Narrow gauge railway in Maryland

Overview
- Locale: Maryland and West Virginia, United States
- Dates of operation: 1883–1894

Technical
- Track gauge: 3 ft (914 mm)
- Length: 26 mi (42 km)

The Green Ridge Railroad was a 3 ft (914 mm) narrow gauge railroad that operated in Allegany County, Maryland, United States.

The rail line was located 8 miles (13 km) east of Cumberland, in the vicinity of Town Hill and Fifteenmile Creek. It belonged to the Mertens family, and supplied lumber to a sawmill at Oldtown for use by the Merten's boatyards in Cumberland to construct and repair canal boats. It connected to the Baltimore and Ohio Railroad at Okonoko, West Virginia, and ended at the Chesapeake and Ohio Canal, across the Potomac River from Paw Paw, West Virginia. The maximum extent of the track system was 26 miles (42 km).

The railroad opened in 1883 and operated as a common carrier through 1891. Subsequently, it operated as a private carrier until it closed in 1894.

== Locomotives ==
The two locomotives for the GRRR were built at the Mount Savage Locomotive Works, for T. H. Paul, under contract.

- Green Ridge Number 1 is featured in an illustration of the Mt. Savage catalog, as the model for the 0-6-0s.
- GRRR Number 2 is an 0-4-0.

Disposition of the engines is unknown.

== See also ==
- List of Maryland railroads
