= Pomeroy and Newark Railroad =

Map of the Pomeroy and Newark Railroad, and the former Delaware and Pennsylvania Railroad to Delaware City

The Pomeroy and Newark Railroad was a railroad company that operated in the US states of Pennsylvania and Delaware from 1881 to 1917. It ran from Pomeroy, Pennsylvania, on the Pennsylvania Railroad's Main Line, south to Newark, Delaware. At Porter, Delaware it connected to the previously existing Delaware Railroad (DRC). It was formed by the merger of the Pomeroy and State Line Railroad and the Newark and Delaware City Railroad in 1881. It became part of the Pennsylvania Railroad system, and in December 1917 the line was sold to the Philadelphia, Baltimore and Washington Railroad, Pennsylvania subsidiary and successor to the PW&B.

The rail that made up the line was abandoned, but the line from Newark to the Delaware Bay remains in service.

== History ==
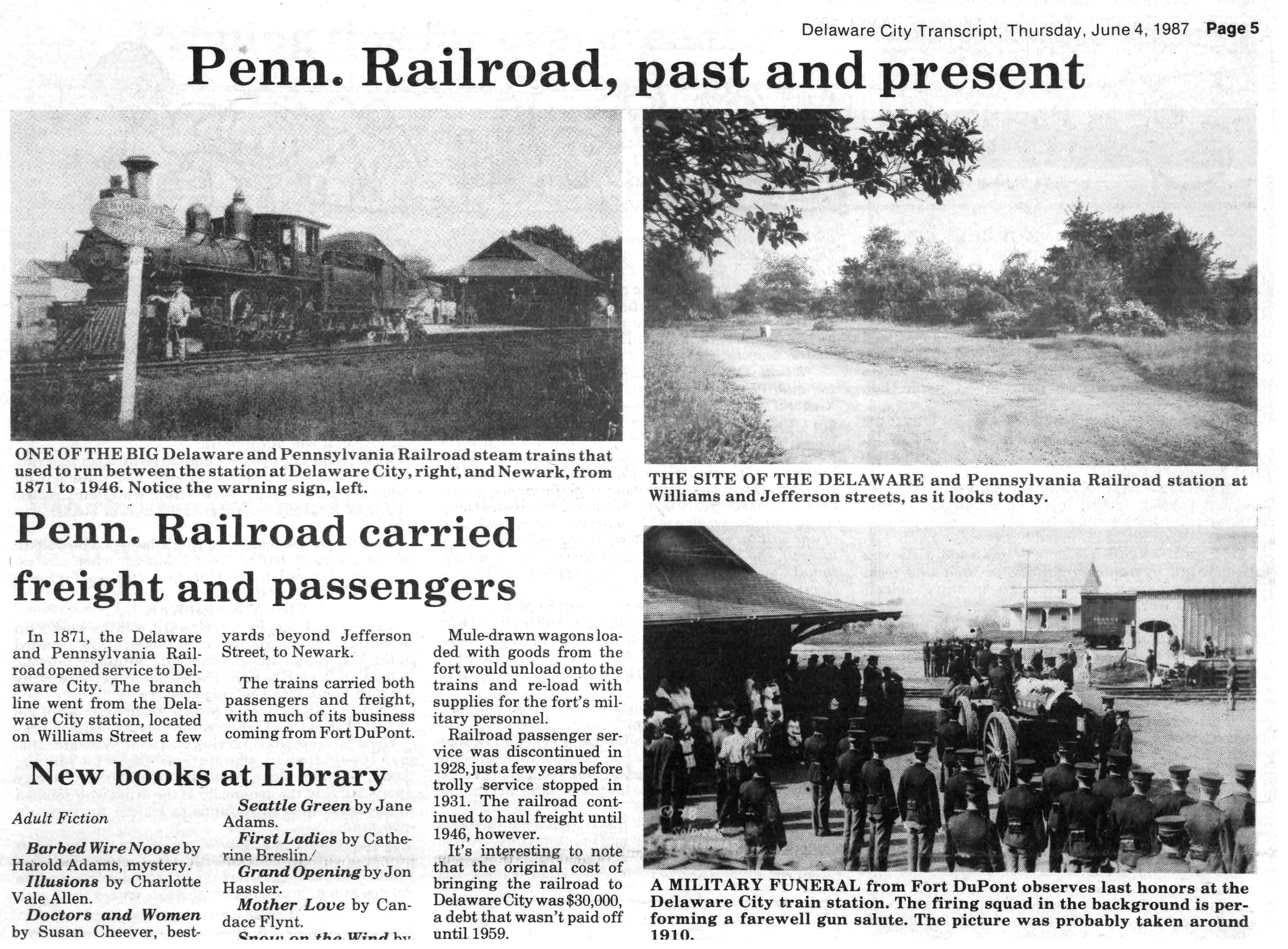
Delaware City Station (Collection, Delaware City Heritage Assn)

The Pomeroy and Newark Railroad was the final step in a series of consolidations and a foreclosure. The earliest predecessors were the Delaware and Pennsylvania Railroad, incorporated February 1857 in Delaware, and the Pennsylvania and Delaware Railroad, incorporated August 1868 in Pennsylvania as the Doe Run and White Clay Creek Railroad, and renamed August 1870. The two companies completed a line from Pomeroy, on the Pennsylvania Railroad's Main Line, south to Newark and southeast to Delaware City on the Delaware Bay, in about 1873, and merged in May of that year to form the Pennsylvania and Delaware Railway. This company's property was sold at foreclosure in August 1879 to two new companies, the Pomeroy and State Line Railroad (incorporated February 1880 in Pennsylvania) and the Newark and Delaware City Railroad (incorporated April 1880 in Delaware). After the latter sold the line southeast of Newark to the Philadelphia, Wilmington and Baltimore Railroad (PW&B), which it crossed at Newark, in 1881, those two companies merged in December as the Pomeroy and Newark Railroad. It became part of the Pennsylvania Railroad system, and in December 1917 the line was sold to the Philadelphia, Baltimore and Washington Railroad, Pennsylvania subsidiary and successor to the PW&B.

The last passenger trains ran over the line in September 1928, and abandonment for freight began in 1936. By the mid-1940s, it existed only at Newark and north of Chatham. These segments would remain to the end of Penn Central Transportation in 1976, except for a 1960s truncation from Chatham to Doe Run, but Conrail only acquired the short stub at Newark. It did operate subsidized contract service on 3.7 miles (6.0 km) between Pomeroy and Buck Run, but this was discontinued in about 1980. Operation of the short piece at Newark, by then owned by Amtrak, went to the Norfolk Southern Railway in the 1999 breakup of Conrail.

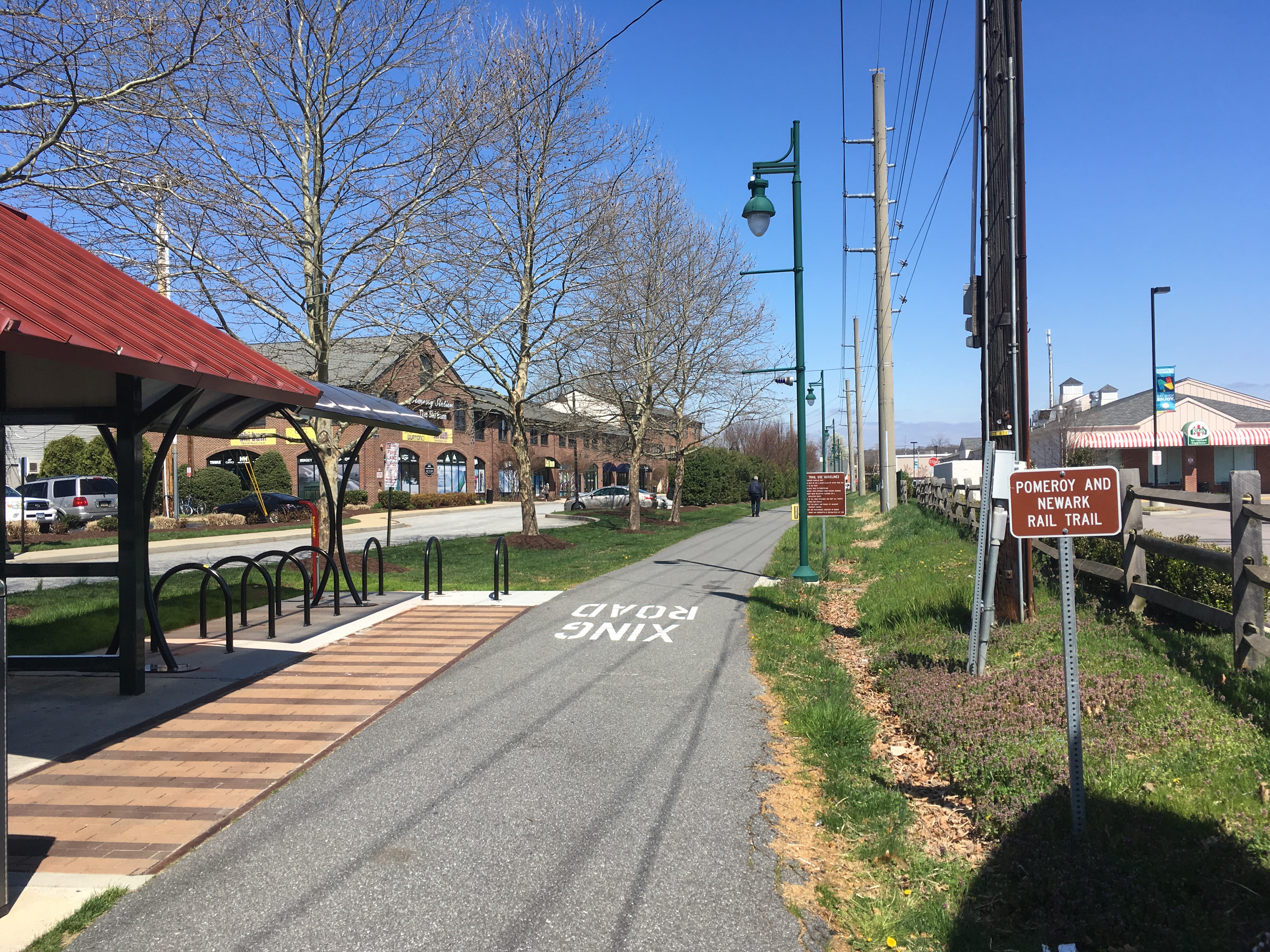
The Pomeroy and Newark Rail Trail north of East Main Street in Newark

Parts of the line have been re-purposed as trail. From the mainline in Newark to Hopkins Road in White Clay Creek State Park, the right-of-way is used for the Pomeroy and Newark rail trail, sometimes just called the Pomeroy Trail. After crossing into Pennsylvania, part of the right-of-way is used for parts of the Charlie Bailey and Penndel Trails in White Clay Creek Preserve. In Landenberg, PA parts of the right of way are use for parts of the Mill Race Trail and the Landeberg Junction Trail.

Ownership of the line between Newark and Delaware City also went to the Norfolk Southern. The line is still used as far as the oil refinery west of Delaware City, and the section of roadbed which once extended past the refinery to the waterfront is Delaware City was abandoned. It is now refinery property.
