= Reybold Industrial Track =

Railway line in Delaware

Overview
- Other name(s): Reybold Running Track, Newark and Delaware City Branch
- Owner: Norfolk Southern
- Locale: New Castle County, Delaware
- Termini: Newark, DE; Delaware City, DE
- Stations: Wilson, Cooch, Keeney, Glasgow, Porter, Corbit, Reybold, Delaware City

Service
- Operator: Norfolk Southern

History
- Opened: 1873

Technical
- Line length: 7.8 mi (12.6 km)
- Track gauge: 1,435 mm (4 ft 8 1/2 in) standard gauge

The Reybold Industrial Track (Reybold IT) is an active railroad line in the U.S. state of Delaware owned and operated by Norfolk Southern (NS). The line connects the Northeast Corridor to the Amtrak Car Shops Bear, the New Castle Secondary at Porter and to various industrial sites in Reybold, a site between Delaware City and New Castle.

It was built by the Delaware and Pennsylvania Railroad in 1873 and passed through several owners before being sold to Norfolk Southern by Conrail. Part of the original line, east of Bear-Corbit Road/Delaware 7 was abandoned.

== Description ==
The rail line begins at a junction with the Northeast Corridor on the southeast side of Newark, in a place sometimes called Pencader or Davis (for the Davis Tower and Davis interlocking that was there). It travels south underneath the Delaware Turnpike, with grade crossings at Delaware 4, S. Old Baltimore Pike and Pulaski Highway before reaching Amtrak's Car shops at Bear, Delaware. It then continues on to a diamond junction with the New Castle Secondary at Porter. It goes past Porter, crossing over County Road and under US-13 with grade crossings at Red Lion Road/Delaware 71 and Bear-Corbit Road/Delaware 7 to connect to a series of industrial tracks that serve various chemical and refinery businesses in the Reybold area.

== History ==
The Reybold Industrial Track is part of what was once the Delaware and Pennsylvania Railroad (D&CR), which was incorporated on February 26, 1857 to build a railroad from a point on the Delaware River convenient to Delaware City to the Maryland or Pennsylvania state line. The D&PRR arranged to connect with the Pennsylvania and Delaware Railroad at the state line, thus creating a line from Pomeroy, Pennsylvania, where it connected to the Pennsylvania Central Railroad, to the Delaware City where they built a large coal wharf. Ground was broken on the railroad in 1871 and the first train ran on the D&PRR on December 23, 1872. On May 1, 1873 the two railroads merged to form the Pennsylvania and Delaware Railway, which was incorporated in Delaware on the same day. The new railroad became part of the shortest route from Chicago to the Atlantic Ocean, 35 miles shorter than going via New York City. The Pennsylvania Railroad (PRR) almost immediately leased the line and built a terminal at Delaware City which was strategically located next to the Delaware and Chesapeake Canal.

In October 1878, the rail line was badly damaged by the Gale of 1878 and it would not go back into operation until May of 1882. As a result, the PRR cancelled its lease of the rail line in 1879.

In August 1879 the P&D Railway went into foreclosure and was purchased by Dale Noblitt, Jr. The property in Delaware was sold in February of 1880 and the railroad was operated by the PRR. A new railroad under the control of the PRR, the Newark and Delaware City Railroad (N&DC) was incorporated in April of 1880 in Delaware. It acquired the 17.38 miles of track from the state line to Delaware City on December 7, 1880.

The N&DC sold the line southeast of the mainline in Newark to the Philadelphia, Wilmington and Baltimore Railroad (PW&B) on October 29, 1881, a few months after the PRR bought the PW&B. It became the Newark and Delaware City Branch of the PW&B/Pennsylvania Railroad.

On November 1, 1902, the PW&B - including the Newark and Delaware City Branch - merged with the Baltimore and Potomac Railroad to form the Philadelphia, Baltimore and Washington Railroad.

In the early 20th century, service on the line began to decrease. The last passenger train ran on September 25, 1927. By the time of the build-up for World War II there were only about two freight trains a week to Delaware City, though traffic picked up during the construction of Fort DuPont. During World War II, the line was heavily used, including the transport of POWs to Delaware City where they were then forced to march through town to the camp at Fort DuPont; but once the fort was decommissioned in 1945 the line east of Reybold had little use and it was abandoned in 1946.

In 1950, a spur was built to serve the Tidewater Oil Refinery which was then under-construction in Reybold. The line between Reybold and Delaware City was removed at some point between 1954 and 1961, likely in conjunction with the refinery construction, which completed in 1957.

The line remained part of the PB&W, and thus PRR, system until 1968. In 1968 it became part of Penn Central and following the bankruptcy of that company in 1970, it was transferred to Conrail in 1976 after Southern Railway declined to purchase it. It was purchased by Norfolk Southern (NS), the successor to Southern along with much of Conrail in 1999.

In 2015, after an increase in business to the Valero refinery at Reybold, NS re-installed the level junction at Porter and upgraded the signaling to allow for more train traffic.

== Name ==
Reybold, or Reybold Station, was a stop on the Newark and Delaware City Branch dating back to the 1880s. It was likely named for William Reybold, one of the directors of the P&DRR and part of a prominent Delaware City family at the time and it later became a name of the area northwest of Delaware City where the railroad currently terminates.

== Remnants ==
Other than the extant line from Newark to Reybold, not much of the line remains. The old railroad bridge over Dragon Creek just north of Delaware City and some of the embankment from there to the Delaware River are the main remnants, but also some of the causeway across Cedar Creek, though greatly eroded, is still visible.
