= South Chester Railroad =

Progressive-Era Railroad

The South Chester Railroad was a railroad that operated in the U.S. state of Pennsylvania from 1881 to 1906.

Incorporated as the South Chester Railroad Company on June 22, 1881, the railroad named John P. Green its first president and William H. Brown its first chief engineer.

On March 27, 1899, its operations were taken over by the Philadelphia, Wilmington and Baltimore Railroad, a subsidiary of the Pennsylvania Railroad. On February 9, 1906, it was merged into the PRR's Philadelphia, Baltimore, and Washington Railroad. At that time, it operated 2.72 miles of track from Chester to the Crescent Oil Works on the Pennsylvania-Delaware state line and 0.49 miles of track from Lamokin, Pennsylvania (now a neighborhood of Chester proper) to the PB&W main line.
