= Queen Anne's and Kent Railroad =

Former railroad in eastern Maryland, US

Overview
- Stations called at: Massey's, Millington, Biggs, Sudlersville, Barclay, White Oak, Tilghman, Roberts, Price, Ashland, Carville, Coxe's, Centreville
- Key people: Thomas Emory, William McKenney
- Locale: Delmarva Peninsula, U.S.
- Dates of operation: 1870–1899
- Successor: Delaware Railroad

Technical
- Track gauge: 4 ft 8 1/2 in (1,435 mm) standard gauge
- Length: 26 miles (42 km)

The Queen Anne's and Kent Railroad (QA&KR) (Sometimes the Queen Anne's and Kent County Railroad) was a railroad company that operated in the US states of Delaware and Maryland from 1870 to 1899. It connected to the previously existing Delaware Railroad (DRC) at its branch from Townsend, Delaware to Massey's Crossroads in Kent County, Maryland and ran through Queen Anne's County, Maryland to Centreville, Maryland. At Massey's Crossroad, later Massey's Station, it also connected to the Kent County Railroad. On January 23, 1899, the QA&KR was merged into the DRC under agreement of December 31, 1898.

== History ==
The QA&KR was incorporated in 1856 to build a line from Centreville, or any other place in the county deemed suitable, to Fredericktown, Maryland in Cecil County to connect to the planned Sassafras River Railroad or to Elkton, Maryland to connect to the Philadelphia, Wilmington and Baltimore Railroad (PW&BR) or to the Delaware State Line to connect via a branch to the DRC. After being delayed by the Civil War the charter was renewed in 1864 and again in 1867. A route was mapped from Massey's Crossroads to a point on the Chester River near Carpenter's Island and they broke ground at Millington on February 6, 1868.

At the same time, the DRC built a branch from their line at Townsend, Delaware to Massey's Crossroads - the Townsend Branch - where the Kent County Rail Road Company (KCRR) would also connect. Construction of the QA&KR fell behind schedule, and the company accused the contractor of committing fraud and colluding with their lead engineer, leading to a change in construction companies in 1870 and a lawsuit in 1872.

In April of 1870, the KCRR began running trains to the Townsend Branch from Kennedyville, Maryland via Massey's Crossroads and, in June, the QA&KR began running trains from Sudlersville. Both company's leased the Townsend Branch from Massey's Crossroads to Townsend, though the QA&KR was a part owner of the branch. The QA&KR extended its line and began running trains to Price's Station in May of 1871. It reached Centreville on August 1, 1871 and at the time was still expected to be extended to Queenstown, Maryland creating a better connection to Baltimore. It was quickly doing good business shipping wood, lumber, peaches, lime, grain, passengers and other products.

An extension of the KCRR, to Chestertown on the Chester River, opened on February 20, 1872 and increased the importance of the QA&KR. Another branch, from just north of Chestertown west to Nicholson' (aka Parsons) on the projected line to Rock Hall via Vickers, opened on August 1, 1872. However, this created a nonsensical dogleg, and it was abandoned and partly removed when a direct line to Nicholson's from Worton, Maryland was completed in October 1873.

Despite the growing importance, the railroad never became profitable. It was sold under the foreclosure of its mortgage on July 14, 1874 and was reorganized and operated under the same name. On August 6, 1877 the PW&BR bought the controlling interest in the QA&KR to keep traffic moving to their lines instead of a port on the Chesapeake. It was widely believed that the purchase of the QA&KR ended any hope of extending the line to Queenstown as it would redirect to Baltimore traffic that currently went through Philadelphia.

In 1880, the railroad built a new station in Centreville.

In 1881, the PW&B was purchased by the Pennsylvania Railroad (PRR), which was at the time the nation's largest railroad. At that time the QA&KR line was merged, along with the DRC, into the Delaware Division of the reorganized PRR, at which point the distinction between the "Townsend Branch" and the QA&KR ceased.

In 1894, the PRR reorganized the railroad from Centreville to Massey's as a separate system, but under the same division and modified the schedule.

On December 31, 1898 it and three other railroads voted to merge into the DRC, then a subsidiary of the PW&BR, owned by the PRR. Over the next three weeks the merger was ratified at separate votes by stockholders of the DRC, the Cambridge and Seaford Railroad and the Delaware and Chesapeake Railroad and then paperwork was filed with the state of Maryland in late January of 1899.

== Legacy ==
Under the PW&BR, the rail line became known as the Queen Anne & Kent and Townsend Railroad by 1905, or sometimes the Queen Anne's and Kent Division, and by 1911 as the Centerville Railroad, Delaware Division. In 1918 the Pennsylvania Railroad took over the lease and it became part of the PRR and then, in 1968, part of Penn Central.

In 1902, the connection between Centreville and Queenstown was finally built, but by the new Queen Anne's Railroad. Though it built to within half a mile of the Queen Anne's & Kent and despite many efforts to get the railroads to do so, the two railroads never connected to one another.

Following the Penn Central bankruptcy in 1970, It was left out of the Final System plan for Conrail in 1976. Maryland and Delaware contracted to subsidize Penn Central, and starting in 1977 Maryland and Delaware Railroad (MDDE) operated the line. In 1982 the Maryland Department of Transportation purchased the line which became MDDE's Centreville Line. 33 of the line's 35 miles are still in active use with service running as far east as Tidewater Publishing on Route 301.

All but the final two blocks of the line still exists all the way to Centreville. A passenger station in Centreville was removed some time after passenger service ended and prior to 1950. Freight service continued to the end of the line until the early 2000's. The Maryland Transit Administration determined that it was no longer feasible to maintain a rail connection to the center of town, and then Centreville purchased the railyard south of Water Street/Railroad Avenue in 2007. The town removed the rails in 2009. In 2010 the extent freight building, dating back to the QA&KR was moved to White Marsh Park, north of town, to preserve it. The City of Centreville has plans to convert the rail line from Water Street to US 301 into a rail trail and develop the railyard into greenspace, parking and housing.

Signage, markers, switch equipment, the Sudlersville Passenger Station and the site of the turn table, ash pit and Engine House at the terminus of the line in Centerville also still exist. The Sudlersville Depot, built in 1885, also dates back to the QA&KR, but other remnants may not.
