= Townsend, Virginia =

Unincorporated community in Virginia, US

Coordinates: 37°11′05″N 75°57′30″W

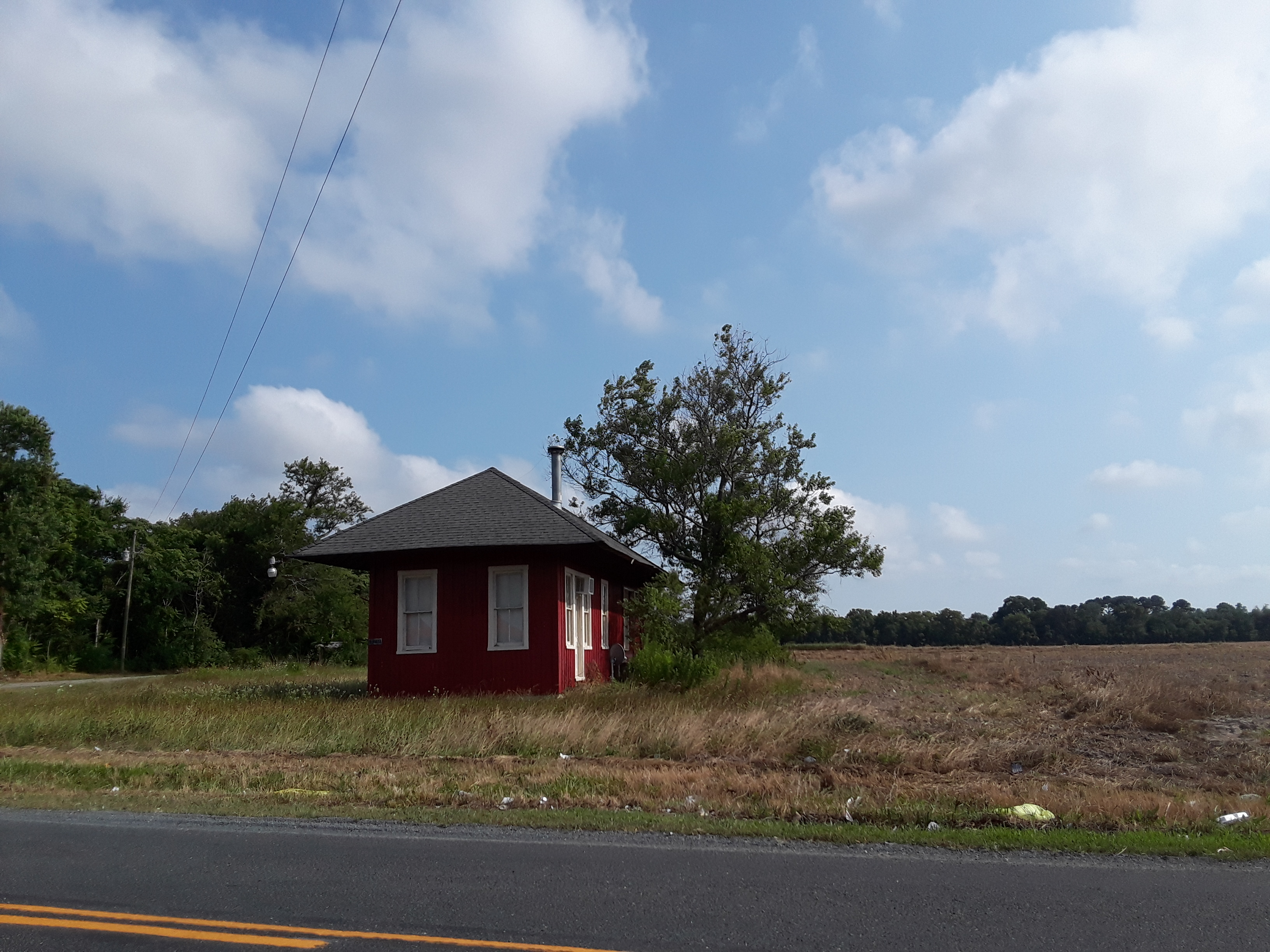
Former railway depot in Townsend, July 2018

Townsend is an unincorporated community in Northampton County, Virginia, United States.
