= Smyrna and Delaware Bay Railroad =

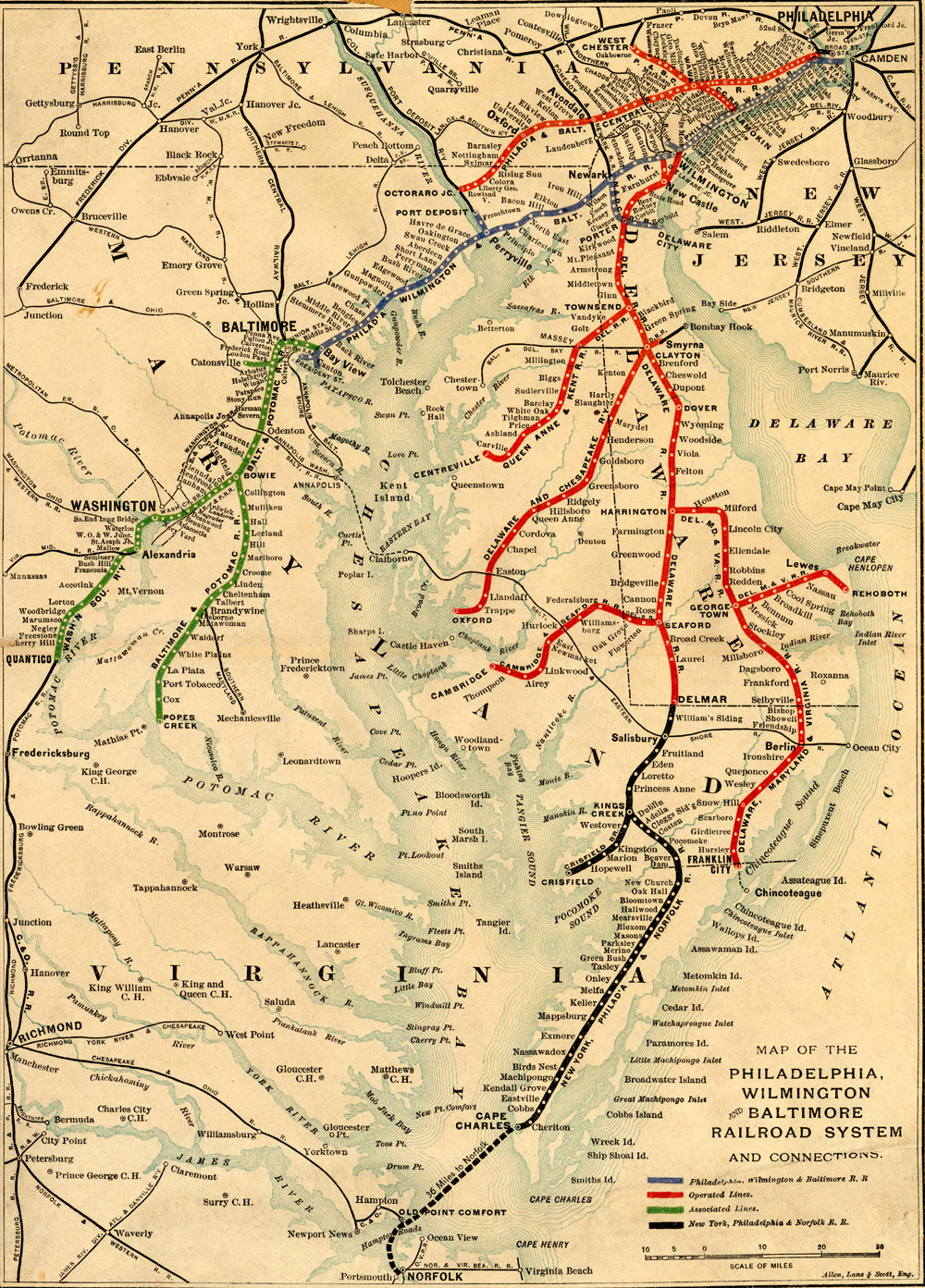
- An early 1890s map of the Philadelphia, Wilmington & Baltimore Railroad showing the Smyrna and Delaware Bay Railroad line

Overview
- Stations called at: Clayton, Delaware; Smyrna, Delaware; Bombay Hook, Delaware
- Headquarters: Smyrna, Delaware
- Locale: Kent County, Delaware, New Castle County, Delaware, Kent County, Maryland
- Dates of operation: 1873–1883
- Successor: Baltimore and Delaware Bay Railroad

Technical
- Track gauge: 4 ft 8 1/2 in (1,435 mm) standard gauge
- Length: 20 miles (32 kilometres)

The Smyrna and Delaware Beach Railroad (S&DBR) was a railroad company that operated in the US states of Delaware and Maryland from 1873 to 1883. It first connected to the previously existing Delaware Railroad (DRC) at Clayton, extending a line to Smyrna, Delaware and then to Woodland Beach, Delaware (aka Pierceson's Cove or Bombay Hook) in New Castle County, Delaware. It later connected to Massey's Crossroad via Kent County Railroad (KCRR) trackage. On May 12, 1883, it merged with the KCRR to form the Baltimore and Delaware Bay Railroad.

== History ==
When the Delaware Railroad built its line south from Bear, Delaware and through Kent County in 1855, there was a fight over where to run it in relation to Smyrna. Some wanted the rail line to run on the east side of town and others on the west. Farmers located about 1.5 miles to the west of Smyrna were able to entice the Delaware to build there - thus bypassing Smyrna - and the community began trying to find a way to connect to it at what was then called "Smyrna Station" (later Clayton) on the Delaware Railroad line.

In February 1861, Delaware chartered the "Clayton and Smyrna Railroad Company" to build a railroad from Smyrna Station to Main Street in Smyrna (but no farther east), but a few days later, after the General Assembly refused to rename Smyrna Station to "Clayton", the law was amended and the railroad renamed the Smyrna Station and Smyrna Railroad Company. On February 14, 1865, with no work having been undertaken, the state incorporated another company - the Smyrna and Delaware Bay Railroad company - with the same group of commissioners, to build a railroad from Smyrna Station to a point on Duck Creek, the Delaware River or the Delaware Bay as they saw fit. Commissioners were elected the following October and the first stockholders meeting was held in January 1866. A contract was signed to build a from Clayton to Smyrna and work began later that year. This line, sometimes called the "Smyrna Station and Smyrna Railroad" opened by February 1867.

In 1867 the Vineland Railroad Company made arrangements to build its railroad south from Atsion, NJ to Vineland, NJ and was planning to further extend the railroad south and west to Stow Creek, across the Delaware Bay from Bombay Hook, which created interest in extending the line to Smyrna to Bombay Hook - sometimes called the Bombay Hook Railroad. There were many people interested in extending the S&DBR east 9 miles to the Bay, but they had trouble getting enough investors and the effort stalled until 1870 when the Vineland railroad was nearing completion to the other side of the Bay.

By 1871, with the Vineland Railroad scheduled to open in October, business interests in New Jersey, including James Fisk, Jr., became interested enough in extending the rail line to Bombay Hook that they were able to sign a contract to start construction. But real work didn't begin until Jay Gould provided backing at which point the charter was amended to allow it to extend west to Maryland. The S&DBR began construction from Woodland Beach, Delaware/Bombay Hook, on the Delaware Bay, west to Smyrna, where it would connect to the existing line to Clayton and the Delaware Railroad, in April 1873. In June, Gould gained control of the Kent County Railroad and extended that railroad from Massey to Clayton. The first train from Smyrna to Chestertown ran in the first week of October 1873 and trains were running to Bombay Hook by November. By February 1874, the Delaware Superior Court ordered the Sheriff to seize the rolling stock for sale. The objective of this line was to form a connecting line (with car ferries at both ends) between the Vineland Railway at Bayside, New Jersey, and Baltimore. Gould changed the proposed western terminus of the KCRR from Rock Hall, Maryland to Tolchester Beach and began dredging work there. Most of the line to Tolchester Beach was graded, but the Panic of 1873 led to the collapse of the project and the KCRR was only extended west as far as Nicholson's, which was located between current day Fairlee and Worton. The line between Massey's Crossroads and Clayton was eventually transferred to the S&DBR. Shortly thereafter, Gould sold his interest in the New Jersey Southern, but he remained active in the line across Delmarva.

The Panic of 1873, and a failure of the peach crop that year, put the railroad in economic trouble. In September 1874 the section of railroad in Kent County, DE was seized for debt and sold at auction to The American Dredging Company to protect their claims against the railroad. In January of 1875 Jay Gould purchased the railroad - which at the time was not running - from American Dredging and in October 1875 he purchased, again at public auction following the seizure of the railroad, the 1.5 miles of track in New Castle County, DE. The line was then closely aligned with the New Jersey Southern Railroad, which connected to it and invested in it, allowing trains to run again, and like the KCRR it was leased to Fred Gerker. In 1877 he purchased the KCRR. After 1877, it was sometimes called the Kent County and Smyrna and Delaware Bay Railroad and by 1881 it was only used for freight.

NJSR (by then part of Central Railroad of New Jersey) bought the KCRR and S&DBR from Jay Gould in 1883 and - as authorized by legislation in 1876 - merged them into the Baltimore and Delaware Bay Railroad in 1884.

For some time prior to 1889, the line was out of service but after it was sold to Philadelphia investors that year, service restarted and the line east of Smyrna was repaired. In August 1889, the New Jersey Central ran its first cars between New York and Delaware using a 3 track barge from Bayside, NJ to Bombay Hook; but the floating pier at Bombay Hook was damaged in a storm just two weeks later.

== Legacy ==
The line was purchased by the Pennsylvania Railroad in 1900. The segment east of Smyrna was abandoned in 1903 and torn up by 1906. The section between Clayton and Smyrna survived through the creation of Penn Central, but was abandoned in 1976.
