= New Castle Secondary =

Railway line in Delaware

Overview
- Owner: Norfolk Southern

History
- Opened: 1838

Technical
- Line length: 17 mi (27 km)
- Track gauge: 1,435 mm (4 ft 8 1/2 in) standard gauge

The New Castle Secondary is an active railroad line in the U.S. state of Delaware operated by Norfolk Southern (NS). The line connects the Shellpot Branch (or Shellpot Secondary) and the Shellpot Industrial Track (Edgemoor Yard) in Wilmington, Delaware to the north with the Delmarva Secondary in Porter, Delaware to the south. On the north, the New Connection Industrial Track helps form a wye at the connection to the Shellpot Branch. The New Castle Secondary connects NS to the Port of Wilmington terminal and the terminal at Reybold which is accessed by a brief running track off of the New Castle near Porter, Delaware. On the south end it connects to the Delmarva Division.

It passes through its namesake New Castle, Delaware, underneath I-295 and traverses the Narrow Dyke Canal and Magazine Ditch near their mouths along the shore of the Delaware River.

== Description ==
The line begins at its northern terminus in Wilmington just west of the Christina River at a wye with the Shellpot Branch. It connects to various chemical plants and terminals in the Pigeon Point area and then passes beneath the Delaware Turnpike before passing through New Castle. West of New Castle it provides a connection to an industrial area south of Army Creek and then crosses over the South Dupont Highway. In Bear, Delaware it crosses under Delaware Route 1 and on the west end it provides a connection to an Amtrak rail yard and car shops just before its terminus where it connects to the Reybold Industrial Track and the Delmarva Secondary.

== History ==
The New Castle Secondary was built in two pieces. The west section, from Bear to New Castle, was part of the New Castle and Frenchtown Railroad which opened in 1832. The east section, from New Castle to Edgemoor was built by the Pennsylvania Railroad (PRR) in 1888 as the New Castle Cutoff.

The NC&F was built to shorten the travel time between Philadelphia and Baltimore, creating a bridge across the neck of the Delmarva peninsula that connected to steamers on both ends. In 1839, the Philadelphia, Wilmington and Baltimore Railroad (PW&B) bought a controlling interest in the railroad and in 1843 it was completely absorbed.

The New Castle and Wilmington Rail Road (NC&W) was extended to the New Castle end of the system in 1852 which connected it to the PW&B and thus the Baltimore and Ohio network. In 1855 the Delaware Railroad connected to it at Bear, about halfway between the two ends. It ran trains to Dover and, starting in 1856, to Seaford, Delaware. The section of rail between Bear and Porter, where the line was intersected by the Pomeroy and Newark Railroad (P&NR) in 1873, makes up the westernmost section of the New Castle Secondary. The opening of the Delaware Railroad sent traffic to Seaford and made the portion of the NC&F line between Bear and Frenchtown unnecessary; and so in 1857 it was abandoned and removed.

In 1888, the Pennsylvania Railroad built the Shellpot Cutoff, which connected to the mainline on the east at Edgemore and on the west past near Little Mill Creek; and the New Castle Cutoff, which connected the Shellpot Cutoff to New Castle. This created a new route from New Castle east to the Pennsylvania Railroad mainline at Edgemore. The line crossed the previously built Wilmington and Northern Railroad (W&NR) just outside of Wilmington at Pigeon Point, and crossed its Christina Avenue Branch near the Lobdell Canal.

By 1906 they had built two lines to support a Chicago Bridge and Iron facility in east New Castle. In 1937, DuPont opened the Atlas Point manufacturing center just south of Magazine Ditch (and the current I-295) and a spur was built off the Cutoff to support it.

In the early 20th century the two sections were part of a line referred to as the Philadelphia, Wilmington and Baltimore Railroad's Delaware Division. By 1952, the New Castle Cutoff had been added to the old NC&F to form the "New Castle Secondary."

The line was acquired, along with the rest of the PW&B, by Penn Central in 1968, then Conrail in 1976. In 1972 the northern part of the old NC&W was shut down. The southern half was shut down soon after and was abandoned in 1984. By 1993, the W&NR had been abandoned from north of where it crossed the New Castle Secondary to the Delaware River.

When Conrail was broken up in 1999, Norfolk Southern (NS) acquired it. NS uses it as one of two routes, the P&NR being the other, to reach the Delmarva Division at Porter. It also serves, since at least 2002, as a connection to the remaining sections of the old W&NR between Pigeon Point and the Christina River and to the Christina Avenue Branch. In the early 2000's, the tracks to the Chicago Bridge and Iron facility were removed when it was rebuilt as the Twin Spans Business Park.
