= Dorchester and Delaware Railroad =

Former railroad in eastern Maryland, US

Overview
- Stations called at: Seaford, Delaware, Oak Grove, Delaware, Federalsburg, Maryland, Williamsburg, Maryland, Hurlock, Maryland, East New Market, Maryland, Linkwood, Maryland, Cambridge, Maryland
- Headquarters: Cambridge, MD
- Founders: William Wilson Byrn, Samuel Morse Felton Sr.
- Locale: Eastern Shore of Maryland, U.S.
- Dates of operation: 1869–1883
- Successor: Cambridge and Seaford Railroad

Technical
- Track gauge: 4 ft 8 1/2 in (1,435 mm) standard gauge
- Length: 27.2 miles (43.8 km)

The Dorchester and Delaware Railroad (D&DRR) was a railroad company that operated in the US state of Maryland from 1869 until 1883. It connected to the Delaware Railroad at the state line just west of Seaford, Delaware and ran to Cambridge, Maryland on the Chesapeake Bay.

In 1882 it went into receivership, and the next year it was purchased by the Philadelphia, Wilmington and Baltimore Railroad which moved it into the newly formed Cambridge and Seaford Railroad. It moved through several owners including the Delaware Railroad, the Pennsylvania Railroad, Penn Central and Conrail before finally coming into the ownership of the Maryland Department of Transportation where it became part of the "Cambridge Industrial Track". The track has been out of use for years, and the part in Cambridge has been abandoned/removed with a small section turned into the Cannery Park Rail Trail.

== History ==
The D&DRR was incorporated in 1866 to connect Cambridge, MD on the Eastern Shore with the Delaware Railroad, the only railroad line that connected to main railroads in northern Delaware, and from there things progressed quickly. On June 24, 1867, the Delaware Railroad Board authorized a branch from Seaford to connect to the D&DRR at the Maryland state line and arranged to lease the D&DRR. On Oct 23rd, 1867 work on the railroad began with an opening ceremony at Cambridge attended by Governor Swann. On April 13, 1868, the Delaware Railroad began to lay track at Seaford, DE towards the Maryland state line and work continued west from there, reaching Gypsy Hill, about 1.5 miles east of Cambridge in late September, when the first passenger train ran on the partially completed line. On November 8, 1869, the first service over the line between Seaford and Cambridge, MD was operated by the D&DRR. By 1870, steamers were running to Cambridge creating a passenger and freight connection to the railroad. Like other railroads on the Eastern Shore, the D&DRR did brisk freight business shipping peaches, berries, apples, pears and seafood north.

Though the D&DRR was reported to be the most valuable freight route on the Delmarva Peninsula, it was struggling financially and the Cambridge and Seaford Railroad (C&SRR) was incorporated in Maryland in 1882 for the purpose of reorganizing it. The Pennsylvania Railroad (PRR) was in the process of consolidating the railroads on the Eastern Shore, having purchased the Delaware and Chesapeake Railroad and the PW&B in 1881, and in May the railroad was placed under their management. In July the company arranged to sell itself to the PRR by decree. In November, the D&DRR entered receivership with Samuel M. Felton and, the railroad's former President, W. Wilson Byrn named receivers and was placed up for sale without finding a suitable buyer. A month later the Philadelphia, Wilmington and Baltimore Railroad (PW&B) purchased a large amount of the stock and early in 1883 purchased the railroad through a proxy. A few months later the C&SRR was organized at Cambridge, MD and the PW&B agreed to operate on it as agent with service starting on June 1, 1883.

== Legacy ==
Part of the line that was built by the D&DRR remains in operation well into the 21st Century and other parts have either been turned into a trail, or have a trail proposals underway.

The C&SRR was merged into the Delaware Railroad in 1899 which became part of the Philadelphia, Baltimore and Washington Railroad's Delaware Division in 1902 and then the Delmarva Division in 1930. In 1968 it all became part of Penn Central and then, following Penn Central's bankruptcy, the United States Railway Association decided not to transfer the line, which became the Cambridge Secondary Track (USRA line 168), to Conrail and it remained with Penn Central until 1981-82.

The line has been leased and operated by the Maryland and Delaware Railroad (MDDE), which calls it the "Seaford Line", since 1977. In late 1981 or early 1982, the line was purchased by the Maryland Department of Transportation and later transferred to the Maryland Transit Authority. MDDE eventually added the extent sections of the old Baltimore, Chesapeake and Atlantic Railway, USRA lines 152 and 153, that connect to it at Hurlock, Maryland and Preston, Maryland to it as part of a larger Cambridge Secondary Track.

The Cambridge Secondary Track is extant all the way into Cambridge, though the last 3/4 mile in Cambridge has been removed. In 1984, when the tracks were still there, the state sold the section between Washington Street and the Port of Cambridge to the City of Cambridge for development and by 1989 they had removed the tracks north of Cedar Street. The 1600'-long section of rail between Cedar Street and Washington Street was removed in 2009, transferred to the control of Cambridge and, after years of advocacy, converted to the Cannery Park Rail Trail in 2021.

Trains have not run past Hurlock, MD since 2016 and Dorchester County and the City of Cambridge have been preparing to railbank that section of the line for years. In 2022 Cambridge began working with MTA to facilitate railbanking the inactive right-of-way between Bucktown Road and Cedar Street in Cambridge. In 2024 MDDE submitted notice of intent to terminate service between Linkwood, Maryland and Cambridge and on the lines at Hurlock. At the same time Dorchester County, which had started preparing to railbank the right-of-way between Hurlock and Cambridge in 2023, filed a request for Notice of Interim Trail Use to use the terminated rights-of-way for trails. In 2025 the county entered into an agreement with MTA to do so.
