= Delaware Railroad =

Former railroad in the US state of Delaware

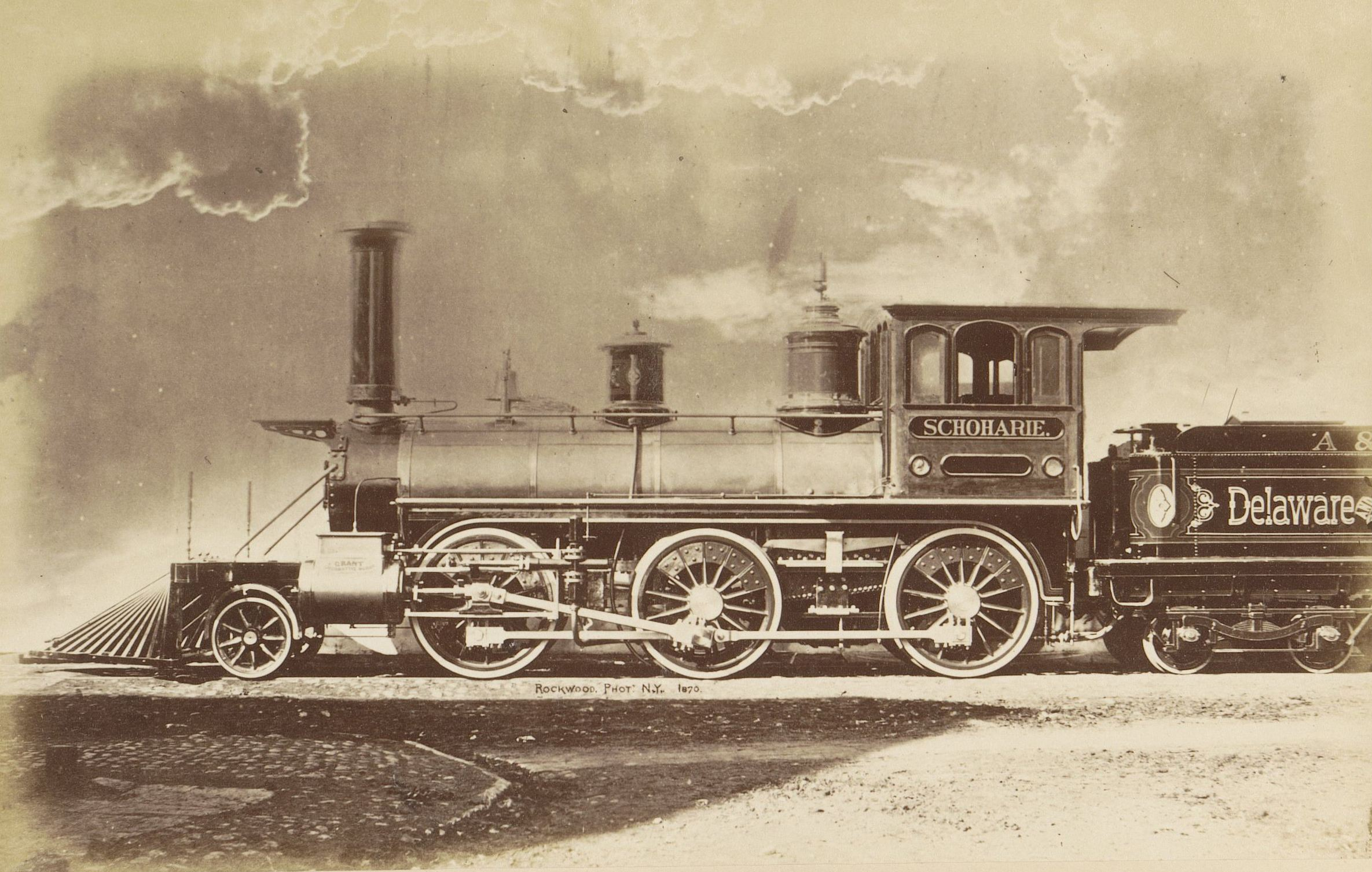
- 2-6-0 steam locomotive Shoharie

Overview
- Headquarters: Clayton, Delaware
- Locale: Delaware
- Dates of operation: 1836–1976
- Predecessor: New Castle and Frenchtown Railroad; New Castle and Wilmington Railroad; Queen Anne's Railroad; Queen Anne's and Kent Railroad; Smyrna and Delaware Bay Railroad; Kent County Rail Road; Baltimore and Delaware Bay Railroad; Delaware and Chesapeake Railway; Cambridge and Seaford Railroad
- Successor: Philadelphia, Baltimore and Washington Railroad; Pennsylvania Railroad; Penn Central Railroad; Conrail; Norfolk Southern; Delmarva Central Railroad; Maryland and Delaware Railroad

Technical
- Track gauge: 4 ft 8 1/2 in (1,435 mm) standard gauge
- Length: 95 miles (153 kilometres)

The Delaware Railroad Company (DRC) was a railroad company that operated in the US state of Delaware from the mid-1850s until 1976, during which time it was the largest in the state. Its original main line began in Bear, Delaware and extended south through Dover and Seaford before reaching Delmar on the border of Maryland in 1859 and it was the only route for train traffic between the peninsula and areas to the north. It eventually built and acquired a network traversing almost the entire state north to south, and with branches going to the Chesapeake Bay and the Delaware Bay/Atlantic Ocean. Although operated independently, in 1857 it was leased by and under the financial control of the Philadelphia, Wilmington, and Baltimore Railroad (PW&B), which was purchased by the Pennsylvania Railroad (PRR) in 1881. Through additional construction, purchases and mergers it built a network that extended to Centerville, Chestertown, Cambridge and Oxford in Maryland and Smyrna in Delaware. It was also a critical part of the connection via the New York, Philadelphia and Norfolk Railroad (NYP&N) to Norfolk, Virginia; via the Smyrna and Delaware Bay Railroad (S&DB) to Woodland Beach, DE and Nicholson Station, MD, and via the Delaware, Maryland and Virginia Railroad (DMVR) to Lewes and Rehoboth Beach in Delaware and Franklin City, Virginia. It remained a part of the PRR system, and its successor Penn Central, until 1976 when Penn Central went bankrupt, at which point it was absorbed into Conrail.

== History ==
=== Origin ===
The railroad was conceived in 1836 by John M. Clayton, a former United States senator who obtained a charter from the Delaware General Assembly on June 20, 1836 to serve the Delmarva Peninsula. He was concerned that a proposal in Maryland to build a line along the western side of the peninsula would harm Delaware's economy. Delaware was highly motivated and exempted the railroad from taxation for fifty years and provided other incentives. Clayton, William D. Waples, and Richard Mansfield were appointed as commissioners and a survey of the line was made. The Depression of 1837-1839 prevented investment in the railroad and the charter was forfeited.

The charter was renewed on February 22, 1849 under the promotion of Samuel M. Harrington (Clayton at this time was serving as the United States Secretary of State). It called for a line from Donas Landing (a Dona steamship line port on the Leipsic River just off Delaware Bay) to Seaford that would be part of a Philadelphia to Norfolk route. Sufficient investment was secured by 1852 when the state of Delaware stepped in and bought 5,000 shares of stock for its construction allowing the commencement of the operation. In 1853, the PW&B railroad and the du Pont family guaranteed Construction bonds.

Work on the line began in 1855 going south from a junction with the New Castle and Frenchtown Railroad (NC&F) in Bear near Porter. The first section was opened with an inaugural eight-car train north from Middletown on September 1, 1855, carrying the president of the railroad and that of the NC&F Railroad, the chief engineer, and railroad contractors. The PW&B immediately started to lease the railroad. The Delaware extended the line to Dover on January 22, 1856, to Seaford on December 11th, 1856 and to the Maryland state line at Delmar, Delaware by early 1860.

Starting in 1857, the PW&B operated the line as its Delaware Division.

Before the railroad, travel south from Philadelphia was a multi-seat trip starting by steamship. Traffic from Philadelphia to Norfolk ran to Donas Landing, approximately 6 miles (9.7 km) northeast of Dover. Passengers would then go by stagecoach to Dover and south to Seaford where they would then resume travel by ship south to Norfolk on the Nanticoke River. Traffic to Baltimore went to New Castle, Delaware crossed the Delmarva Peninsula via the NC&F railroad to Frenchtown, Maryland where they switched to another steamship. The success of the Delaware Railroad (DRC) caused the NC&F to abandon the railroad from Porter to New Castle in 1857 and move its steamship operations to Seaford, and for the stage line to Seaford and the steamship line to Donas Landing to be abandoned as well.

==== Route ====
The railroad ran inland to avoid wetlands near the coast through areas that had been sparsely populated. Railroad access spurred the growth of farms in this part of the state as farmers had means to ship produce north to Philadelphia, New York and Boston. Land that had not been farmed was cleared as the new access to city markets increased agricultural output. The railroad assisted the Delaware peach industry, allowing faster peach transport to market than had been possible by steamship. It also allowed the introduction of peach orchards to areas without access to river shipping. The industry spread downstate from the Delaware City area where it originated as the railroad extended further south. By 1875, five million baskets (900,000 carloads) of peaches were shipped on the DRC. The railroad is credited with the peach becoming a "signature crop" in Delaware - the first state from which peaches were a commercial crop shipped long distances to market. In 1863, peach farmers sued the railroad after they grew a bumper crop but the railroad did not have enough freight cars to accommodate the entire crop, and as a result, there was significant spoilage. The railroad felt the judgment was "exorbitant".

New towns formed along the railroad including Bridgeville, Greenwood, Clayton (named for the railroad's founder John M. Clayton) was nearby Smyrna which did not want the railroad competing with its shipping industry, Wyoming (nearby Camden refused to allow the railroad to be built through the town), Felton (named after David Felton, president of the railroad) and Harrington. In 1855, the railroad located its main office in Clayton.

The DRC mainline became the spine to which all Delmarva branch lines connected. After completing its line to Delmar, the DRC started building branches and acquiring control of those that connected to it in Delmarva.

=== Civil War ===
Before the Civil War, southern sympathizers utilized the railroad as a route south to join the Confederacy. In 1861, Charles du Pont Bird (a descendant of E.I. du Pont) advised General Robert E. Lee that the railroad should be destroyed to prevent its use by the Union Army to ship troops and supplies to Washington, DC. The railroad remained under Federal control throughout the war. The railroad was used to ship contraband south to the Confederacy as its geography placed it in a prime smuggling route.

=== Network Expansion ===
==== Junction and Breakwater (Rehobeth Beach, Delaware) ====
The first railroad on the Delmarva Peninsula to tie into the DRC was the Junction and Breakwater Railroad (J&B). It built a junction with the DRC at Harrington, DE that went east to Milford, which it reached by 1859 and then, following a pause caused by the Civil War, south to Georgetown and then east to Lewes by 1869. In 1874 the Breakwater and Frankford built an extension off of that south from Georgetown to the Maryland state line at Selbyville where the Worcester Railroad continued it to Franklin City, Virginia. The J&B built a 5 mile extension from Lewes to Rehoboth by 1878.. In 1883 the three railroads merged to create the DMVR.

==== Eastern Shore (Norfolk, Virginia) ====
The DRC was only allowed to construct a rail line within the state of Delaware. In 1853, when the DRC funding was coming into place, the 1835 charter of the Eastern Shore Railroad was revived, a new company organized in 1959 and work on the line south from Delmar continued as one project, reaching Salisbury in April 1860. After the disruption of the Civil War, the Eastern Shore extended the line to Crisfield, Maryland in 1866 and built a branch to Pocomoke City, Maryland in 1871.

In 1879 the Eastern Shore Railroad was foreclosed on and acquired by the NYP&N which built an extension from Pocomoke City to Cape Charles, Virginia in 1884.

==== Maryland and Delaware (Oxford, Maryland) ====
The Maryland and Delaware Rail Road Company (M&D) was incorporated in 1854 to build a railroad from Talbot county to connect with the DRC at Smyrna Station (later Clayton, Delaware). On December 27, 1857, almost a year after the DRC started operation, the M&D began work on their line. It was graded and bridged as far as Greensboro, Maryland by 1859. Work was interrupted by the Civil War and finally resumed in October 1865. By 1868 trains were running to Ridgely and by 1869 to Hillsborough. The first trains reached Easton on August 14, 1869 and the first freight train left there on August 31. Daily passenger traffic didn't begin until November 15, 1869. An extension to Oxford was built in 1871.

==== Dorchester Branch (Cambridge, Maryland) ====
In 1867, the DRC Board authorized construction of a branch from Seaford to meet the Dorchester and Delaware Railroad (D&DRR) line from Cambridge, Maryland at the Maryland state line near Oak Grove, Delaware and later lent the D&DRR sufficient capital to complete its 27-mile line from Cambridge. On April 11, 1868, the DRC began laying track at Seaford, Delaware towards the Maryland state line and in November 1868 it opened the Dorchester Branch between Seaford, Delaware and the Maryland state line. On November 8, 1869, the first service over the entire line between Seaford and Cambridge was operated by the D&DRR, which leased the Delaware portion of the rail.

==== Queen Anne's and Kent Railroad (Centreville, Maryland) ====
In 1868 Queen Anne's and Kent Railroad (QA&KR) mapped a route west to Massey's Crossroads with intentions to connect to the DRC. The DRC agreed to build a branch from their line at Townsend, Delaware to Massey's Crossroads, to be co-owned by the QA&KR, where the Kent County Rail Road Company (KCRR) would also connect. The branch to Massey was completed in the spring of 1869, but construction of the QA&KR fell behind schedule.

In April of 1870, the KCRR began running trains to the DRC from Kennedyville, Maryland through Massey's Crossroads and in June, the QA&KR began running trains from Sudlersville. Both company's leased the DRC's line from Massey's Crossroads to Townsend, though the QA&KR was a part owner of the branch. The QA&KR continued extended it's line and began running trains to Price's Station in May of 1871. It reached Centreville on August 1, 1871.

==== Smyrna and Delaware Bay (Chestertown, Maryland to Woodland Beach, Delaware) ====
An extension of the KCRR, to Chestertown on the Chester River, opened on February 20, 1872. Another branch, from just north of Chestertown west to Parsons (on the projected line to Rock Hall) via Vickers, opened on August 1, 1872. However, this created a nonsensical dogleg, and it was abandoned and partly removed when a direct line from Parsons to Worton, Maryland was completed in October 1873.

In June of 1873, the KCRR came under control of the Smyrna and Delaware Bay Railroad. The S&DB built a line across Delaware from Woodland Beach to the state line, crossing the DRC at Clayton. At the state line it connected to the KCRR and the QA&KR at Massey's Crossroads.

The S&DB and KCRR got into financial trouble and were merged into the Baltimore and Delaware Bay Railroad (B&DBR) in 1883. Operations on the B&DBR line east of Smyrna, Delaware ceased in 1897 and the line to Nicholson station ceased in 1897. The PRR bought the whole line on June 25, 1902, assigned it to its PW&B, and promptly abandoned it east of Massey on July 1. A short section from the west side of Clayton to Smyrna was preserved.

==== Queen Anne's (Love Point, Maryland to Lewes, Delaware) ====
The last railroad to connect to the DRC was the Queen Anne's Railroad (QAR). It started construction in Maryland in 1895 and reached the DRC at Greenwood in 1897. In 1898 it extended its line to Lewes where it connected to the DMVR line to Rehoboth.

=== Pennsylvania Railroad and Consolidation ===
The PRR acquired the PW&B in 1881, thus bringing the DRC under its control. The PRR later purchased several east–west lines serving locations throughout the Delmarva Peninsula in Delaware and the eastern shore of Maryland, effectively securing a monopoly over the peninsula.

After opening in 1884, the NYP&N utilized the DRC track to reach its line to Cape Charles and this increased business on the DRC. Cape Charles was located close to the mouth of the Chesapeake Bay on Virginia's Eastern Shore and the railroad used a rail ferry to reach Norfolk, Virginia.

In 1891, the PRR added the former NC&F from Bear to New Castle; the former New Castle and Wilmington Railroad (NC&W) between New Castle and Delaware Junction on the Northeast Corridor, and the New Castle Cutoff from New Castle to South Wilmington to the DRC; extending its northern terminus to the Christiana River in Wilmington. With this additional track, the total length of the mainline was 95.2 miles (153.2 km).

That same year the PRR acquired the DMVR, though that was not added to the DRC.

On January 23, 1899, the QA&KR to Centreville, Maryland, the Cambridge and Seaford Railroad (Successor to the D&DRR) to Cambridge, and the Delaware and Chesapeake Railway (D&CR) (Successor to the M&D) to Oxford, Maryland were merged into the DRC under agreement of December 31, 1898.

==== Delaware Division ====
In 1902, the PW&B merged with the Baltimore and Potomac to form the Philadelphia, Baltimore and Washington Railroad (PB&W). As a result the DRC's trackage, along with the DMVR's, became part of the PB&W's Delaware Division. At the same time the remaining section of the B&DBR from Smyrna, Delaware to Chestertown, Maryland and the D&CR from Clayton to Oxford, Maryland was transferred to the DRC. The first became the Smyrna Branch and the latter the Oxford Branch.

In 1905, the PRR acquire the QAR and added it to the Delaware Division, but like the DMVR it was not added to the DRC. This brought all the railroads of southern and central Delaware under the control of the PRR.

In 1910, the PB&W renewed its lease of the DRC for another 99 years. The lease included the:

- mainline From the Northeast Corridor/Delaware Junction to Delmar 95.2 miles (153.2 km)
- branch New Castle Cutoff from New Castle to South Wilmington 5.98 miles (9.62 km)
- branch Centreville Line from Centreville, Maryland to Townsend 34.99 miles (56.31 km)
- branch Chestertown Line from Chestertown, Maryland to Massey, Maryland 20.52 miles (33.02 km)
- branch Nicholson Branch from Earl Nicholson Road to Worton, Maryland 3.73 miles (6.00 km) (Operations had ceased in 1895 and in 1910 the directors directed the removal and disposition of the track material on this branch.)
- branch Smyra Branch from Smyrna to Clayton 1.27 miles (2.04 km)
- branch Oxford Branch from Oxford, Maryland to Clayton 54.27 miles (87.34 km)
- branch Seaford Line from Cambridge, Maryland to Seaford, Delaware 32.96 miles (53.04 km)

In 1930, the Delaware Division and the Norfolk Division were combined to form the Delmarva Division.

==== Delmarva Division ====
Facing competition from automobiles the railroad began to cut back service. Passenger service ended on August 8, 1949. Freight service between Easton and Oxford ended in 1957 and that section of track was abandoned in 1959. In 1968, shortly before the creation of Penn Central, the PRR closed the Chestertown station.

=== Penn Central ===
Facing financial difficulties in the 1960s, the PRR merged with its rival New York Central in 1968 forming the Penn Central which itself filed for what was, at that time, the largest bankruptcy in U.S. history in 1970. In 1976, the DRC was absorbed into Conrail, created by the Federal Government to operate the potentially profitable lines of multiple bankrupt carriers and the entity ceased to exist.

== Legacy ==
=== Railroads ===
Most of the old DRC system is still in use. Conrail became profitable in the 1980s and almost all of its rail lines were sold off to CSX Transportation and the Norfolk Southern Railway (NS) in 1998. Norfolk Southern purchased the most profitable portions of the old Delaware Division railroads. The rest was purchased by the Maryland Department of Transportation (MDOT).

NS owns the DRC's mainline from Wilmington to Delmar. The portion from Wilmington to Porter is called the New Castle Secondary and is operated by NS. The section from Porter to Delmar and then on to Pocomoke City, Maryland is called the Delamarva Secondary. NS operated the Delmarva Secondary until its operations were spun off in October 2016 to the Delmarva Central Railroad (DCR), a short-line railroad that operates 188 miles (303 km) of track on the Delmarva Peninsula, though the track is still owned by NS and others. The DCR operates on the mainline from Porter to Delmar; 0.4 miles of the Oxford Branch (now the Oxford Industrial Track) in Clayton and 2.3 miles of the old Cambridge line, now the "Cambridge Industrial Track", in Seaford.

MDOT purchased the Chestertown line (aka Chestertown Secondary (USRA Line 149)), the Centreville Line (aka Centreville Secondary (USRA Line 147/148)), the Oxford Branch (aka Oxford Secondary (USRA Line 169)) and the Cambridge Line (aka Cambridge Secondary (USRA Line 168)) and all of those have been operated by a new Maryland and Delaware Railroad (MDDE) since 1977. The first two were combined into the "Northern Line" and the Cambridge line is called the "Seaford Line" by the MDDE. The Chestertown line is still in use past Worton and almost to Chestertown with the last 3.25 miles having been railbanked or removed. The Centreville Line is in use to the east side of Centreville, with the last 2 miles having been removed. The Oxford line was operated by MDDE until 1983 and then all but a very short stub was railbanked. The Cambridge line remains all the way into Cambridge, though the last 3/4 mile has been either abandoned or turned into a trail and the train has not run past Hurlock since 2016.

=== Stations ===
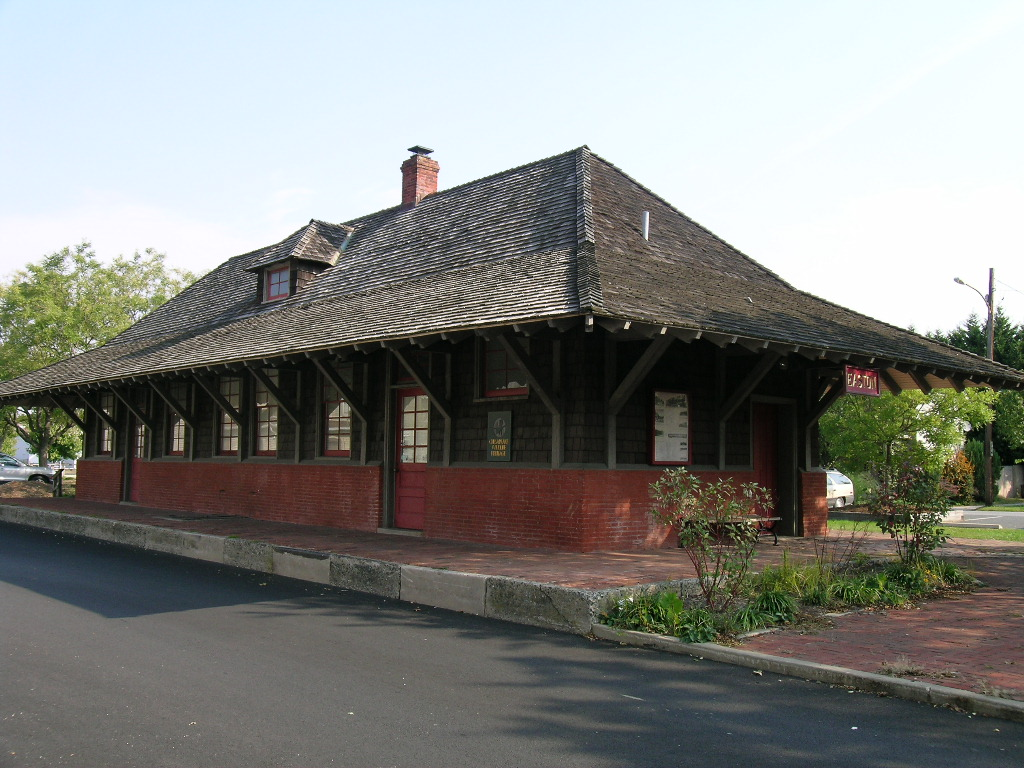
Easton Railroad Station in 2005

Some of the railroad's old stations still exist.

==== Mainline Stations ====
The old Clayton Station, built in 1855, still stands a short distance from the junction where it is used as event space.

The Wyoming station was listed on the National Register of Historic Places (NRHP) in 1980.

The Felton Railroad Station was listed on the NRHP in 1981 and was renovated for use as a museum.

The Seaford Station Complex was listed on the NRHP in 1978.

==== Chestertown Line Stations ====
Black Station, located in Kent County, southeast of Locust Grove.

Kennedyville Station, now in Hockessin, Delaware.

The Chestertown station was listed on the NRHP in 1982.

==== Centerville Line Stations ====
The Barclay Station is currently a residence in the town of Sudlersville, MD.

The Centreville Freight Station has been moved outside of town to a park and is being restored.

==== Oxford Branch Stations ====
The PRR Depot in Hartly, DE is still standing and is used as a private home.

The Marydel Train station was moved out of town and allowed to fall into such disrepair that the town was unable to bring it back in 2006. It currently serves as a junkyard office.

The Goldsboro, MD railroad station (built circa 1920) was moved to Henderson, MD in 1980, but then hauled back to Goldsboro in 1996 where it sits in Railroad Park and awaits restoration.

The train station in Ridgely which was built in 1892, was preserved in 2013 and now serves as a museum. It closed to passenger service in 1949 but continued to be used for freight until 1976. It was then used by several businesses, and even served as town hall in the 1990s.

The Easton train station (built circa 1906) on Pennsylvania Avenue in Easton, MD currently hosts the town's Parks and Recreation Department.

The Trappe Railroad Station (at times called Oxford) still exists in Oxford at the corner of Oxford Road and Almshouse Road and is used as a real estate company's office. The prior house used as the ticket station is also extent, just across the street.

==== Cambridge or Seaford Line ====
The Williamsburg Station was moved to Hurlock in the late 1990's

The Cambridge Station, built in the 1880's, currently serves as office space.

=== Right-of-Way ===
In many places where the right-of-way is no longer used for rail, it has been adopted for use as trails or roads.

==== Jack A. Markell Trail ====
Most of the old NC&W line was turned into the Jack A. Markell Trail, but the portion in New Castle and in the I-295 footprint have disappeared. A small portion between the Shellpot Secondary and the Northeast Corridor is still used as a crossover between those two lines and serves as a part of the West Wilmington Industrial Track.

==== Wayne Gilchrest Trail ====
2.2 miles of the old B&DBR right-of-way in Chestertown was used to create the Wayne Gilchrest Trail and another 2 miles or more is being considered for an expansion. Other parts of the right-of-way became Holletts Corner Road/DE Road 126 west of Clayton, DE and part of Main Street in Smyrna, DE.

==== Oxford Branch Trails ====
Maryland owns the abandoned Oxford Branch which it has been trying to turn into a rail trail since 2005. It was railbanked in 2013 and the long-term plan is to turn the whole route into a rail trail. Several pieces have been turned into short trails already and other trails are in advanced planning, including the 15 miles in Talbot County. In 2006, DelDOT studied the State of Delaware’s section of the Oxford Branch and recommended it for further evaluation and prioritization for Capital Improvement Programs within the Statewide Long-Range Transportation Plan.

Along the right-of-way, disused tracks, bridges, overpasses, mileposts and embankments still remain. The overpasses at Tappers Corner Road and Old Queen Anne's Highway, as well as bridges over Oldtown Branch, Forge Branch (Ford and Jarrel Branch), Peachblossom Creek and Trippe Creek are among the remnants.

The portion of the right-of-way through Easton, including the bridge over North Fork Tanyard Branch, was converted to a rail trail in 1998.

Approximately 2000 feet of the right-of-way in Ridgeley, MD was turned into a rail trail in 2009.

Around 2019, the railroad bridge over Tuckahoe Creek in Queen Anne, MD and a short section of the railroad ROW in Tuckahoe State Park were turned into a potion of Anna's Trail and also serves as part of the American Discovery Trail.

In 2024 a group called "Talbot Thrive" proposed turning the ROW from Oxford to Easton into the Oyster Trail and the section from Easton to Tuckahoe State Park into the Frederick Douglass Rail Trail.

In Spring 2025, MDOT launched a project to design a 10-mile section of the proposed Frederick Douglass Rail-Trail, on the MDDE right-of-way, between Tuckahoe State Park and Black Dog Alley near Easton, MD.

==== Cannery Park Rail Trail ====
A 1600'-long section of the Seaford Line right-of-way in Cambridge, MD was converted to the Cannery Park Rail Trail in 2021.
