= Massey, Maryland =

Unincorporated community in Maryland, United States

- Unincorporated community
- Location within Maryland Location within the United States
- Coordinates: 39°18′35″N 75°49′31″W
- Country: United States
- State: Maryland
- County: Kent
- Elevation: 66 ft (20 m)
- Time zone: UTC-5 (Eastern (EST))
  - Summer (DST): UTC-4 (EDT)
- ZIP code: 21650
- Area codes: 410, 443, and 667
- GNIS feature ID: 590760

Massey is an unincorporated community in Kent County, Maryland, United States. Massey is located at the intersection of Maryland routes 299, 313 and 330, southeast of Galena.

The town was originally known as Massey's Crossroads and became a railroad junction in 1870 when the Delaware Railroad built a branch to the area from Townsend, Delaware on its mainline. The Kent County Railroad connected to the branch in April 1870, eventually extending the line to Chestertown, Maryland, and the Queen Anne's and Kent County Railroad reached it by a separate line in June of that year and eventually extended its line to Centreville, Maryland. It was to be one end of the planned Elkton and Massey's Crossroads Railroad too, making it a key line on the "Eastern Shore Railroad" - Maryland's attempt to keep Eastern Shore railroad traffic in Maryland and make Baltimore more competitive with Philadelphia - but that line was never built. As a result, the town became known as Massey's Station. Later that was shortened to just Massey's and finally Massey.

The town was named for the Massey family which had lived in the area since Benjamin Thomas Massey, who served in the Maryland House of Deligates 1813–1823, moved there in 1796.

== Education ==
It is in the Kent County Public Schools. Kent County Middle School is in Chestertown, and Kent County High School is in an unincorporated area, in the Butlertown CDP with a Worton postal address.

The community was formerly assigned to Millington Elementary School. In 2017 the school board voted to close Millington Elementary School.
