= New Castle and Frenchtown Turnpike and Railroad Company =

Former railroad in Delaware and eastern Maryland, US

New Castle and Frenchtown Turnpike and Rail Road
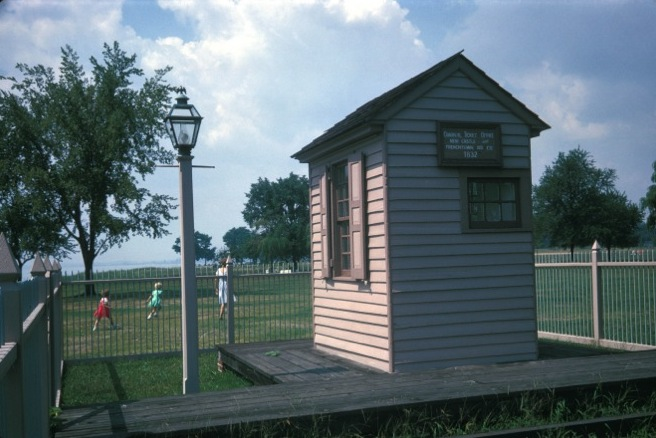
- An NC&F ticket office sits in a park in New Castle, Delaware

Overview
- Locale: Delaware and eastern Maryland, U.S.
- Dates of operation: 1832–1877
- Successor: Philadelphia, Wilmington and Baltimore Railroad

Technical
- Track gauge: 4 ft 8 1/2 in (1,435 mm) standard gauge
- Length: 16.19 miles (26.06 km)

The New Castle and Frenchtown Turnpike and Rail Road (NC&F) was a railroad, opened in 1832, that connected the Delaware River at New Castle, Delaware to the Chesapeake Bay at Frenchtown, Maryland. It was the first railroad in Delaware and one of the first in the United States. Approximately half of the route was abandoned in 1857; the rest became part of the Pennsylvania Railroad (PRR) route into the Delmarva Peninsula and is still used by Norfolk Southern Railway.

The abandoned segment from Bear, Delaware, to Frenchtown, the New Castle and Frenchtown Railroad Right-of-Way, was listed on the National Register of Historic Places in 1976.

== History ==
When construction began in 1804 on the Chesapeake & Delaware Canal, which would connect the Delaware River to the Chesapeake Bay, merchants and other businessmen of New Castle, Delaware, perceived a threat to their interests and proposed a railroad to connect their own city to the bay. The New-Castle and Frenchtown Turnpike Company was chartered in Delaware on January 24, 1809, and in Maryland on January 6, 1810. It opened in 1815 and 1816, providing a turnpike from New Castle in a west-southwest direction to Old Frenchtown Wharf, Maryland, on Chesapeake Bay. The easternmost section of the road, east of Clark's Corner (under 3 miles), was built in 1812 by the New Castle Turnpike Company, chartered January 30, 1811.

In 1828, the Maryland General Assembly authorized the company to replace the turnpike with a railroad and change its name to the New-Castle and French Town Turnpike and Rail Road Company. Similar laws did the same for the two companies in Delaware, renaming the New Castle Turnpike Company to the New Castle Turnpike and Railroad Company. The companies merged on March 31, 1830, to form the New Castle and Frenchtown Turnpike and Rail Road Company – with no dash in New Castle – and the new railroad, constructed by chief engineer John Randel Jr. starting in 1830, opened on February 28, 1832, using horses for about a year before switching to steam locomotives. It was the first planned passenger steam locomotive in the United States, but was beat into operation by others. It originally used stone sleepers (ties) instead of the more common wooden ones. By May of 1837 the railroad had constructed a second line parallel to the first to allow the trains in each direction to run on their own track.

The railroad faced significant competition before it even opened. The Chesapeake & Delaware Canal had opened in 1829, becoming a major competitor to the turnpike and later the railroad. In 1831, four railroad companies were chartered to build a railroad between Philadelphia and Baltimore. It took several years to get funding, but they completed their work in December of 1837 and the next year they merged to form the Philadelphia, Wilmington and Baltimore Railroad (PW&B). In 1838, the Baltimore and Ohio Railroad began operating trains along this new route between Baltimore and Philadelphia, bypassing the much smaller and less significant New Castle.

On March 15, 1839, the PW&B bought a controlling interest in the NC&F, using it as an alternate route; and in 1843 the NC&F was completely absorbed by the PW&B.

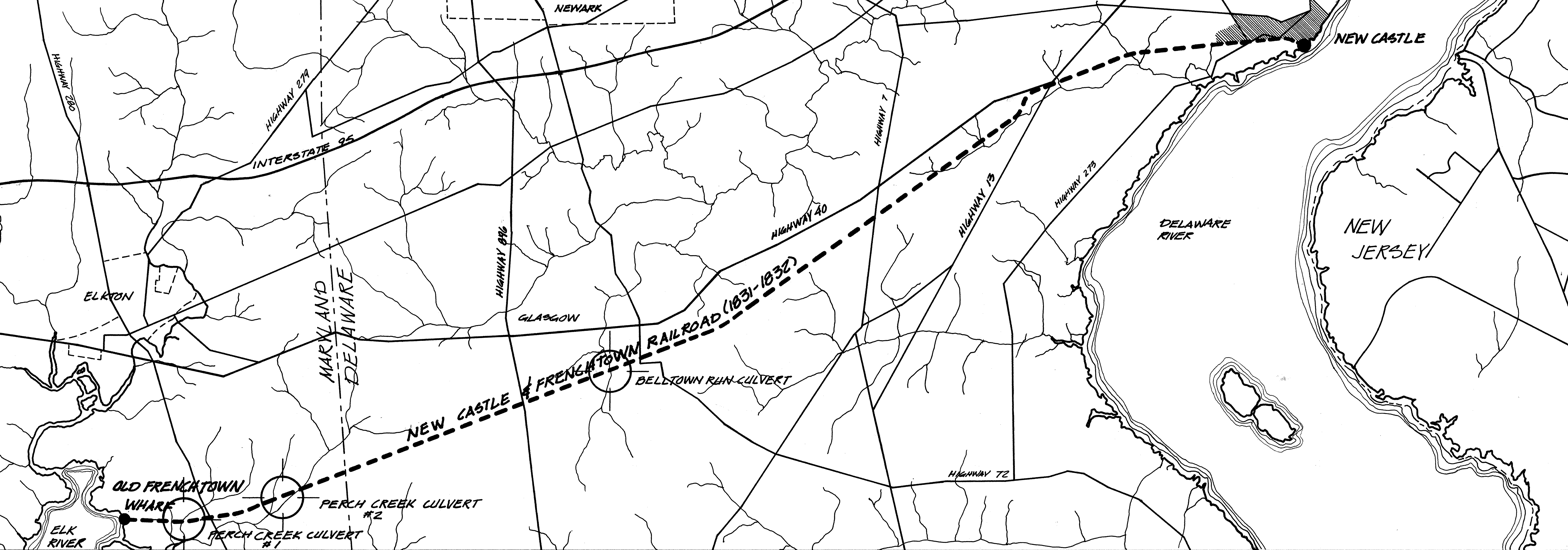
Modern map of the railroad

The New Castle and Wilmington Railroad was connected to the New Castle end of the system in 1852, and in 1855 the Delaware Railroad opened, splitting from the New Castle and Frenchtown at Bear, about halfway between the two ends. By that time, the steamboats were discontinued.

The PW&B abandoned the Cecil County portion of the track in March of 1857. It removed its wharves and buildings from Frenchtown and relocated to Seaford, Delaware the southern terminus of the Delaware Railroad. The depot was torn down in 1863. Later, the County Commissioners turned it into "a common neighborhood road."

On March 28, 1877, the New Castle and Frenchtown was merged into the PW&B, which was part of the PRR system. In 1891, the PW&B sold the old New Castle and Frenchtown, as well as the New Castle and Wilmington line, to the Delaware Railroad, which was then in turn leased to the PW&B.

~1000 feet of the railroad, on the southside of New Castle between Washington Street and South Street, was abandoned sometime prior to 1903 and the rest to the river was added to the New Castle and Wilmington. The section from South Street to the New Castle Pier was abandoned in 1952.

The remaining track, eventually called the New Castle Secondary was acquired by Penn Central in 1968, then Conrail in 1976. When Conrail was broken up in 1999, Norfolk Southern acquired it and now uses it to reach the Delmarva Peninsula.

== Remnants ==
In addition to the extant New Castle Secondary rail line between Bear and New Castle, a few remnants remain.

- Parts of the rail bed can be found between Bear and Frenchtown, with East Lewis Shore Road in Maryland and McDaniel Lane in Delaware built on the right-of-way.
- Culverts over Perch Creek and Belltown Run still exist.
- A former ticket office has been turned into a museum in New Castle Battery Park with some artifacts including a section of rail.
- Several of the granite sleepers (ties) can be found around New Castle as pavers and steps.
- Umbrella Row in New Castle is built on part of the eastern abandoned right-of-way.

== Notes ==
Preceded by New-Castle and French Town Turnpike and Rail Road Company; The New Castle Turnpike and Railroad Company	The New Castle and Frenchtown Turnpike and Rail Road Company formed by merger March 31, 1830 merged May 15, 1877	Succeeded by Philadelphia, Wilmington and Baltimore Railroad Company
Preceded by	The President, Managers and Company of the New-Castle and Frenchtown Turnpike Company chartered January 24, 1809 name changed March 14, 1828	Succeeded by New-Castle and French Town Turnpike and Rail Road Company
Preceded by The President, Managers and Company of the New-Castle and Frenchtown Turnpike Company	New-Castle and French Town Turnpike and Rail Road Company name changed March 14, 1828 merged March 31, 1830	Succeeded by The New Castle and Frenchtown Turnpike and Rail Road Company
Preceded by	The New Castle Turnpike Company chartered January 30, 1811 name changed February 7, 1829	Succeeded by The New Castle Turnpike and Railroad Company
Preceded by The New Castle Turnpike Company	The New Castle Turnpike and Railroad Company name changed February 7, 1829 merged March 31, 1830	Succeeded by The New Castle and Frenchtown Turnpike and Rail Road Company
