= Baltimore and Delaware Bay Railroad =

Overview
- Locale: Delaware and eastern Maryland
- Dates of operation: 1870–1902
- Successor: Delaware Railroad

Technical
- Track gauge: 4 ft 8 1/2 in (1,435 mm) standard gauge

The Baltimore and Delaware Bay Railroad, originally part of the Central Railroad of New Jersey's route from New York City to Baltimore, Maryland via central Delaware, was later part of the Pennsylvania Railroad system.

== History ==
Chapter 148 of the 1856 Session Laws of Maryland, passed March 8, 1856, chartered the Kent County Rail Road Company, charged with building a railroad from the Chesapeake Bay or connecting Chester River in Kent County east to a point on the north side of the Sassafras River in Cecil County or on the Queen Anne and Kent Railroad, as well as branches to any point in Kent County.

Construction began in March 1868, but a shortage of funds brought work to a halt in September 1868. Work began again in April 1869, with the intention of building from the Delaware Railroad and the Queen Anne and Kent Railroad at Massey to Rock Hall (where a ferry would connect with Baltimore), with a branch to Chestertown. The line was opened from Massey to Kennedyville in April 1870. The rest of the line from Kennedyville to Chestertown on the Chester River opened on February 20, 1872. A branch from just north of Chestertown west to Parsons (on the projected line to Rock Hall), via Vickers, opened on August 1, 1872. However, this created a nonsensical dogleg, and was abandoned and partly removed when the direct line from Parsons to Worton was completed in October 1873.

The Smyrna and Delaware Bay Railroad was chartered July 14, 1865. With the backing of Jay Gould, who gained control of the Kent County Rail Road in June 1873, it began construction in April 1873 and opened in September 1873, from Woodland Beach, Delaware, on the Delaware Bay, west to the state line, where an extension of the Kent County Railroad was built to connect (using the clause in the charter allowing for branches). The objective of this line was to form a connecting line (with car ferries at both ends) between the Vineland Railway at Bayside and Baltimore. Gould now changed the proposed terminus from Rock Hall to Tolchester Beach and began dredging work there. Most of the line to Tolchester Beach was graded, but the Panic of 1873 led to the collapse of the project.

On February 15, 1877 the Kent County was sold at foreclosure and bought by the New Jersey Southern Railroad (later part of the Central Railroad of New Jersey (CNJ)), which merged the two companies as the Baltimore and Delaware Bay Railroad on May 12, 1883. The remainder of the Parsons-Chestertown line was now removed, and used to extend the main line from Parsons to Nicholson (Earl Nicholson Road). However, only the line from Clayton to Chestertown was regularly operated, the Nicholson Branch and the line to Woodland Beach being operated only seasonally. By 1888, the first mile of track west of Woodland Beach had been abandoned.

In May 1889 the CNJ stopped operating the line, although it was still heavily under CNJ influence. The line was upgraded, and new carfloats and floatbridges were built at Bayside and Woodland Beach during the summer. Car float service was opened on August 17, 1889, largely handling peach traffic. However, the Woodland Beach float bridge was destroyed by a hurricane on September 8–10 and was never rebuilt. The line east of Smyrna, Delaware was closed in 1895, and the line from Worton to Nicholson was closed in 1897 after the peach crop failed. The Pennsylvania Railroad bought the whole line on June 25, 1902, assigned it to its Philadelphia, Wilmington and Baltimore Railroad, and promptly abandoned it east of Massey on July 1. On October 2, all the property was transferred to the Delaware Railroad, another PRR subsidiary. However, the Baltimore and Delaware Bay was not dissolved until December 8, 1920.
