= Philadelphia, Baltimore and Washington Railroad =

Former American Class I railroad (1902–1976)

- Map of the Philadelphia, Baltimore and Washington Railroad up to 1945
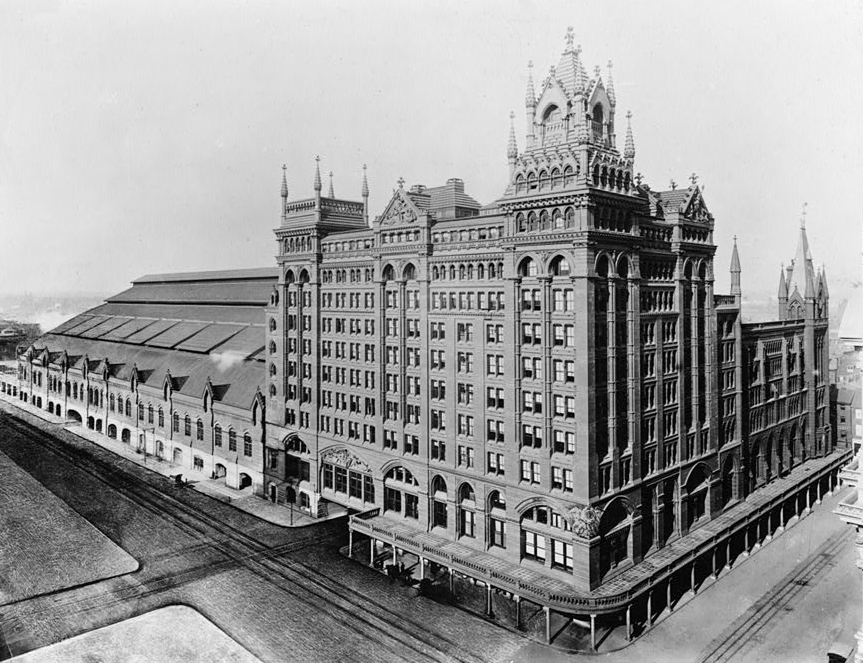
- Broad Street Station in Philadelphia, which housed the company's headquarters until 1930

Overview
- Headquarters: Philadelphia (Broad Street Station)
- Locale: Pennsylvania, Delaware, Maryland and Washington, D.C.
- Dates of operation: 1902–1976
- Predecessor: Philadelphia, Wilmington and Baltimore Railroad; Baltimore and Potomac Railroad; Pittsburgh, Cincinnati, Chicago and St. Louis Railroad
- Successor: Amtrak (passengers); Conrail system (freight)

Technical
- Track gauge: 4 ft 8 1/2 in (1,435 mm) standard gauge
- Electrification: 12 kV 25 Hz
- Length: 717 miles / 1,154 km (pre-PCC&StL merger)

The Philadelphia, Baltimore and Washington Railroad (PB&W) was a railroad that operated in Pennsylvania, Delaware, Maryland, and the District of Columbia from 1902 until 1976. A key component of the Pennsylvania Railroad (PRR) system, its 131-mile (211 km) main line ran between Philadelphia and Washington. The PB&W main line is now part of the Northeast Corridor, owned by Amtrak.

== History ==
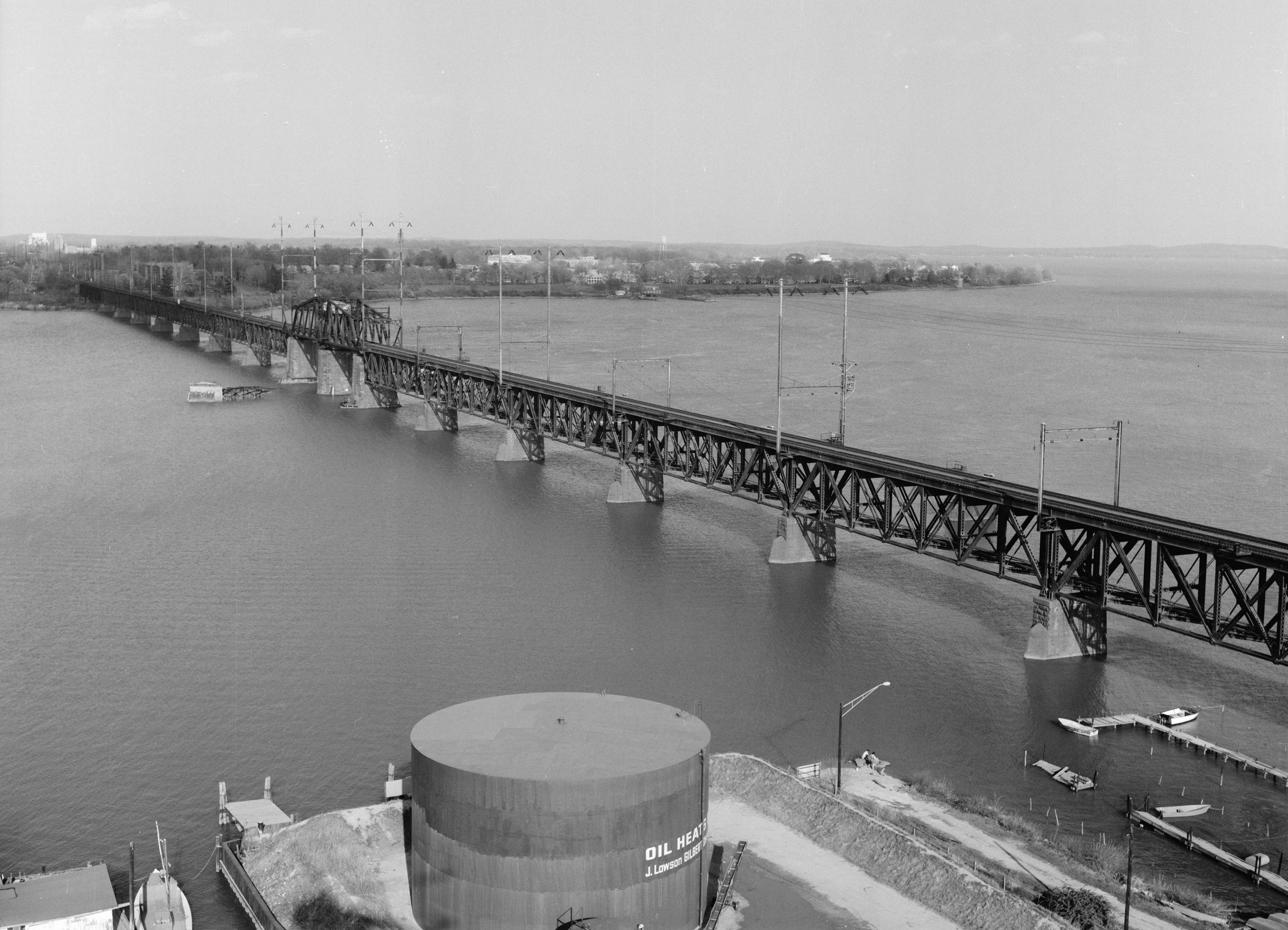
This 1906 bridge over the Susquehanna River, now called the Amtrak Susquehanna River Bridge, replaced the Civil War-era 1866 PW&B Railroad Bridge between Havre de Grace and Perryville, Maryland.

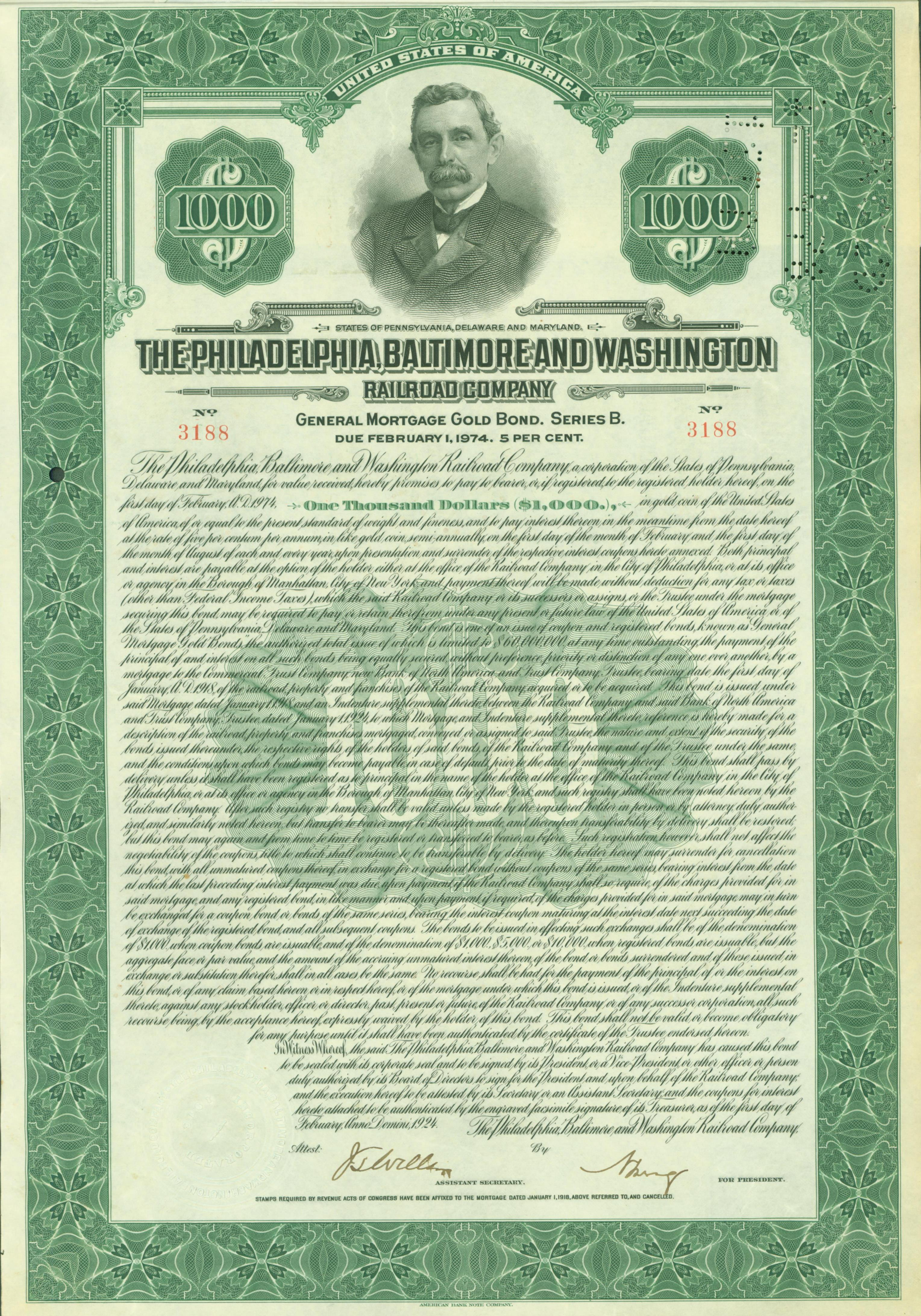
Gold Bond of the Philadelphia, Baltimore and Washington Railroad Company, issued 1 February 1924

The railroad was formed in 1902 when the Pennsylvania Railroad merged two of its southern subsidiaries, the Philadelphia, Wilmington and Baltimore Railroad and the Baltimore and Potomac Railroad.

In 1907, the PB&W became a co-owner of the new Washington Terminal Company, which operated the new Washington Union Station, the marble structure dubbed the "Transportation Temple of America".

In 1916, the PB&W operated 717 miles (1,154 km) of road, including 9 miles (14 km) of trackage rights.

=== Acquisitions ===
The PB&W acquired six railroad companies:

- 1906: South Chester Railroad
- 1913: Baltimore and Sparrow's Point Railroad, which provided freight service to Bethlehem Steel Corporation's Sparrows Point steel mill
- 1916: Philadelphia and Baltimore Central Railroad
- 1916: Columbia and Port Deposit Railway
- 1916: Elkton and Middletown Railroad
- 1956: Pittsburgh, Cincinnati, Chicago and St. Louis Railroad (Pan Handle Route)

=== Improvements ===
In 1928, the PRR began to electrify the main line between New York City and Washington, D.C., using catenary. Electrification of the PB&W portion was completed in 1935. Amtrak still uses the 25 Hz traction power system.

=== Dissolution ===
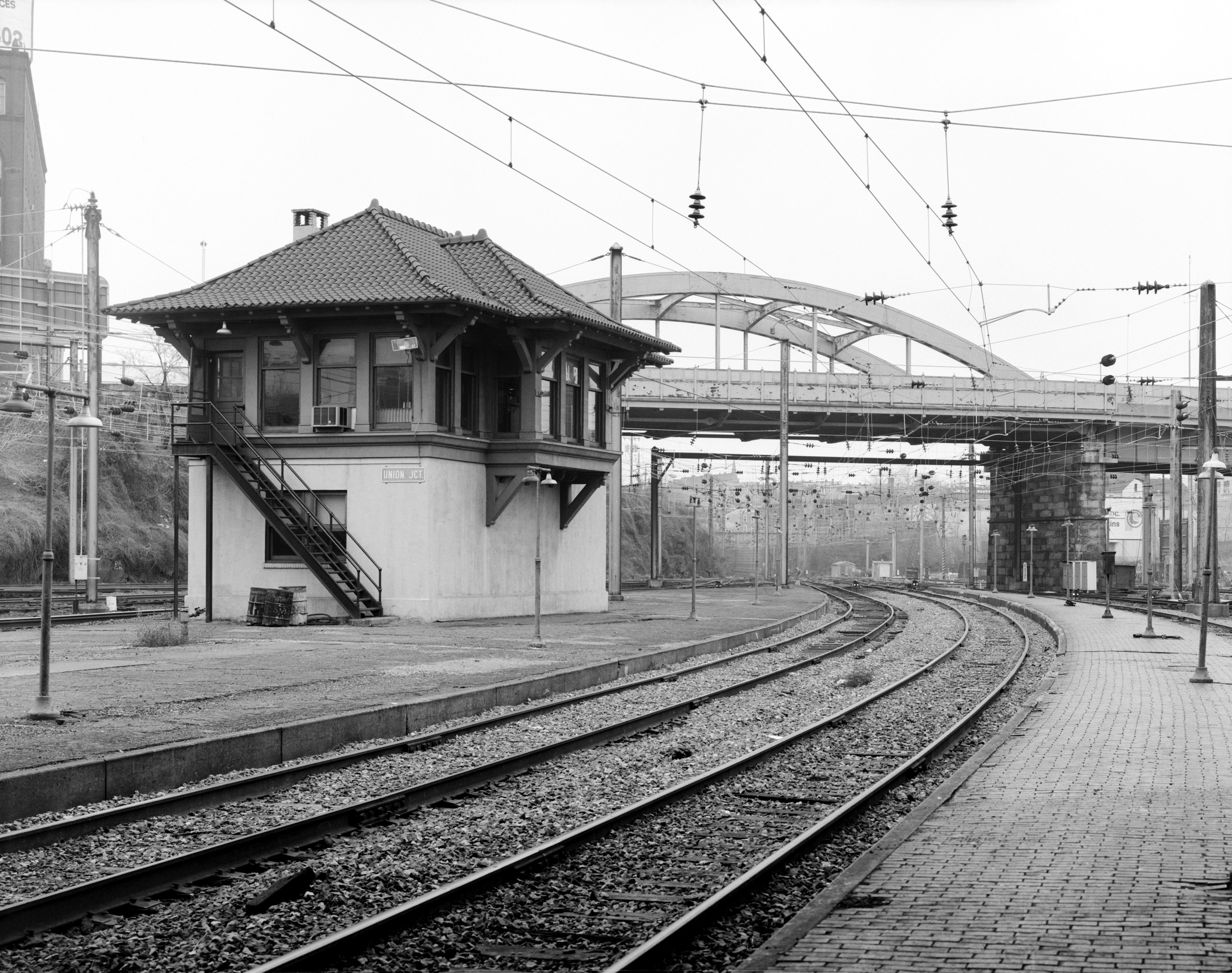
Union Junction Tower in Baltimore, built in 1910, operated into the Amtrak era, when it closed in 1987.

In 1968, Pennsylvania Railroad and its longtime rival New York Central Railroad merged to form the Penn Central Railroad. The PB&W remained a separate legal entity, although controlled and operated by the new company. The Penn Central declared bankruptcy in 1970 but continued to operate trains until 1976, when the company's railroad assets were sold under the Railroad Revitalization and Regulatory Reform Act. Under the new law, Congress authorized the sale of the PB&W right-of-way between Philadelphia and Washington, and related assets (such as the Washington Terminal Company), to Amtrak. Other PB&W assets, including almost all of the PCC&StL (Pan Handle), were sold to the new Consolidated Rail Corporation (Conrail).

== In popular culture ==
- Flip Wilson's "Ugly Baby" (1965) routine is set on the Pennsylvania Railroad, outbound from Baltimore.

== See also ==
- List of Delaware railroads
- List of Maryland railroads
- List of Pennsylvania railroads
- List of railroads in Washington, D.C.
