= Worcester and Somerset Railroad =

Former railroad in the US states of Maryland

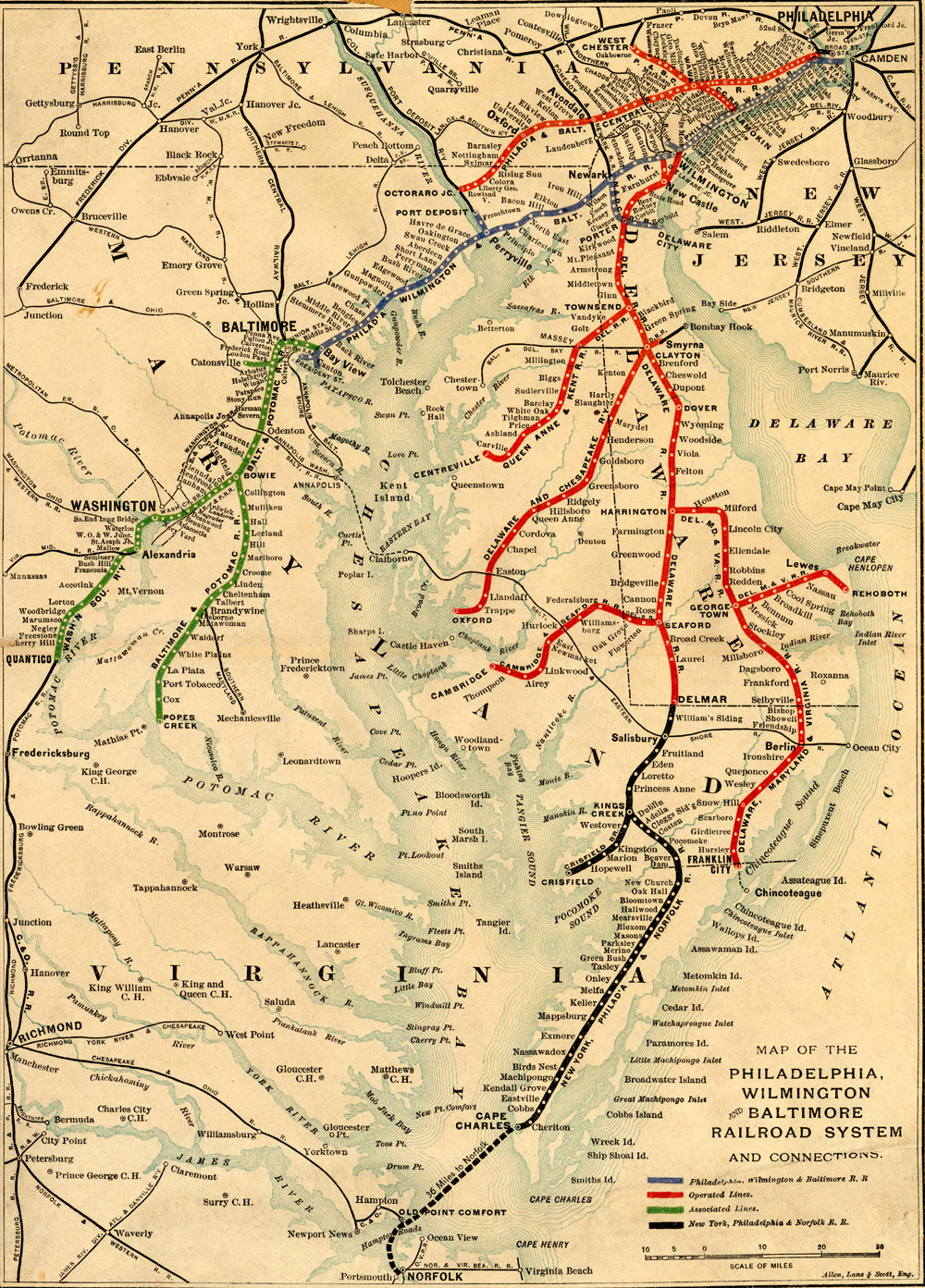
- An early 1890s map of the Philadelphia, Wilmington & Baltimore Railroad showing the Worcester and Somerset Railroad line

Overview
- Stations called at: Adelia Mill/Arden, Costen's, Newtown/Pocomoke City
- Headquarters: Pocomoke City, MD
- Locale: Somerset County, Maryland,Worcester County, Maryland
- Dates of operation: 1867–1880
- Successor: The Peninsula Railroad of Maryland; New York, Philadelphia and Norfolk Railroad; Penn Central Railroad; Conrail; Norfolk Southern

Technical
- Track gauge: 4 ft 8 1/2 in (1,435 mm) standard gauge
- Length: 9 miles (14 kilometres)

The Worcester and Somerset Railroad (W&S) was a railroad that ran between Peninsular Junction (sometimes "Newtown Junction") and Pocomoke City, Maryland in the late 19th Century. It was chartered in 1867 to build a new train line from the Eastern Shore Railroad (ESR) near Westover, Maryland to the Virginia State Line, but it was only built as far as Pocomoke City.

It became the Peninsula Railroad of Maryland in 1880 and in 1882 it merged with the Peninsula Railroad of Virginia to form the New York, Philadelphia and Norfolk Railroad (NYP&N). As part of the NYP&N it was part of the Pennsylvania Railroad system and with it transferred to Penn Central in 1968 and then to Conrail in 1977. In 1999 Conrail sold the line, along with other trackage, from Porter, DE to Pocomoke City, MD, to Norfolk Southern which calls it the Delmarva Subdivision (sometimes known as the Delmarva Secondary or Delmarva Sub). The Delmarva Central Railroad operates trains on it.

== History ==
In 1866, following the Civil War, the ESR extended their line from Salisbury, Maryland to Crisfield, Maryland. In the same year that construction on that was underway, work began to charter the W&S to build a line from a point on the ESR at Back Creek to the Virginia line. The charter was passed in 1867.

Work began on grading the railroad in the fall of 1868, but stalled until 1871 when the W&S restarted construction of a 9-mile line branch off of the ESR from a point at Kings Creek, called Newtown Junction, to Pocomoke City. The first train to West Pocomoke, MD - to a place called Costen's station near the intersection of current Costen's Road and Follow Ditch Road ran on May 30, 1872. It was extended to the Pocomoke River on August 12.

The railroad struggled and in 1875 it was sold at auction to General William Painter to pay its debts. Later that year, the W&S considered extending the rail line to Chincoteague Bay at Swans Gut Creek, but never followed through on it. Under Painter it also started making plans to extend to Cherrystone, just north of Cape Charles, VA which had been discussed since at least 1873. But none of these plans came to fruition, the railroad continued to struggle and in 1877 Painter sold it at auction to George A. Rham of Philadelphia. Painter was retained as the President of the company.

=== Peninsula Railroad ===
By 1880, the W&S had gone into foreclosure and was sold to the Peninsula Railroad Company (sometimes called the Peninsula Railroad Company of Maryland) to which it changed its name. At the same time Newton Junction was renamed Peninsula Junction. It was again authorized to extend the line to any point on the Maryland-Virginia line in Worcester County. The Peninsula Railroad had been chartered in 1870 as the Peninsula Railroad of the Eastern Shore to build a railroad from Salisbury, Maryland to either a point on the Philadelphia, Wilmington and Baltimore Railroad near the town of Elkton or to the Chesapeake Bay, but it had never been used for that purpose. In 1882, the Peninsula was authorized by Maryland to extend to both the Virginia state line and the Delaware state line and to consolidate with railroads in Maryland, Delaware and Virginia and it began to secure a route. It was still considering a branch to Swans Gut Creek at the time. On May 25, 1882 it merged with the Peninsula Railroad of Virginia to form the New York, Philadelphia and Norfolk Railroad (NYP&N).

In 1884 the ESR was merged into the NYP&N and on October 25, 1884, the line was extended to Cape Charles, Virginia.

== Legacy ==
The NYP&N was always affiliated with the PRR which would eventually take control of it. In addition to Cassatt the PRR financed construction of the rail line. In 1908 it purchased a controlling share of the NYP&N's stock. In 1920 it took over operations with a 999-year lease and in 1922 it converted the railroad into the "Norfolk Division" of the Pennsylvania Railroad. When the PRR reorganized in 1930, The Norfolk Division became part of the Delmarva Division.

In 1968 the W&S section of the Delmarva Division moved with all of the other PRR properties to the Penn Central, and the NYP&N ceased as an entity. The Penn Central declared bankruptcy just two years later.

The section from Peninsula Junction to Pocomoke City remained part of Penn Central for some years before being sold to Norfolk Southern after 1981. It is still owned by NS and the Delmarva Central Railroad operates the 9 miles as part of the Delmarva Secondary.
