= New York, Philadelphia and Norfolk Railroad =

Former American railroad

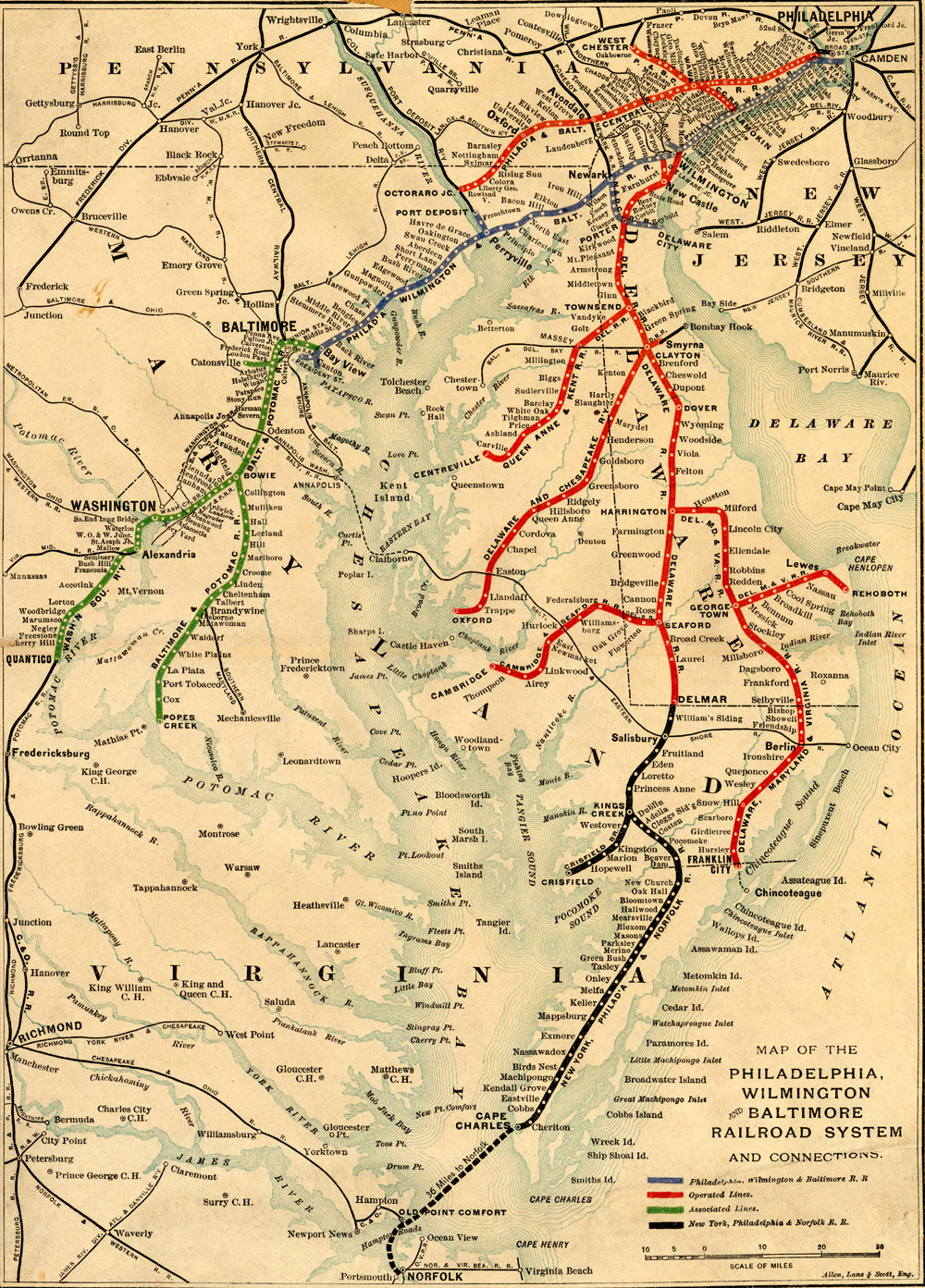
- An early 1890s map of the Philadelphia, Wilmington & Baltimore Railroad showing the New York, Philadelphia and Norfolk Railroad line in black

Overview
- Stations called at: Main Line - Salisbury, Fruitland, Eden, Loretto, Princess Anne, King's Creek, Dublin, Adelia Mill/Arden, Costen's, Newtown/Pocomoke City, Beaver Dam, New Church, Oak Hall, Bloomtown, Hallwood, Mearsville/Mears Station, Bloxom, Masons, Metompkin/Parksley, Merino, Green Bush, Accomac Station/Tasley, Onley, Melfa, Pungoteague/Keller, Mappsburg, Belle Haven/Exmore, Nassawadox, Birds Nest, Machipongo, Kendall Grove, Eastville, Cobbs, Cheritan, Cape Charles. Crisfield Branch - Westover, Kingston, Marion, Hopewell, Crisfiled. Kiptopeke Branch - Townsend, Kiptopeke
- Headquarters: Pocomoke City, MD; then Cape Charles, VA; and then Philadelphia, PA
- Founders: William L. Scott, A.J. Cassatt
- Locale: Delmarva Peninsula
- Dates of operation: 1882–1968
- Successor: Penn Central Railroad; Conrail; Norfolk Southern

Technical
- Track gauge: 4 ft 8 1/2 in (1,435 mm) standard gauge
- Length: 122.28 miles (196.79 kilometres)

Map

The New York, Philadelphia and Norfolk Railroad (reporting mark NYP&N) (Nicknamed the "Nip and N") was a railroad that owned and operated rail lines on the Eastern Shore of Maryland and Virginia connected by its ferries and barges to Norfolk, Virginia, Old Point Comfort and Portsmouth, Virginia where it owned less than a mile of railroad. It built the line from Pocomoke City, Maryland to Cape Charles, Virginia and an extension from Townsend, Virginia to Kiptopeke. It was always affiliated with the Pennsylvania Railroad (PRR), but was taken over by the PRR in 1920. In 1968 it was absorbed into Penn Central. The track between Delmar and Hallwood, Virginia on the main branch and for 1.2 miles south of Kings Creek on the Crisfield Branch is still in use, but the rest is abandoned.

== History ==
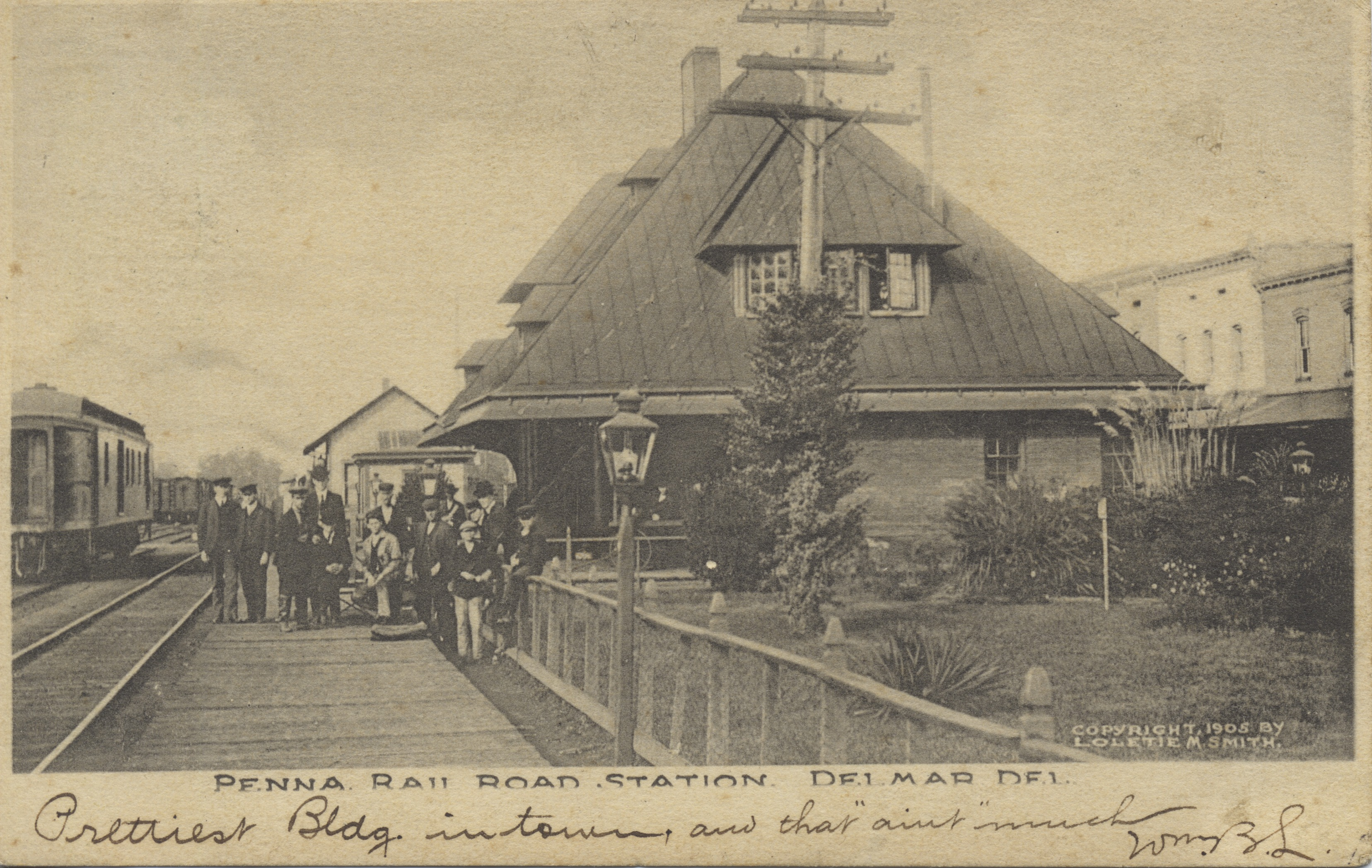
Station at Delmar, Delaware, 1905

=== Concept and planning ===
Shortening the trip between Philadelphia and Norfolk had been a goal of many businesses dating back to the early 19th Century. In 1825 people travelled from Philadelphia by boat to dover and then by coach overland to Seaford, switching back to steamer to Norfolk. Later the Delaware Railroad (DRC) replaced the coach with rail. Later the DRC was connected to Wilmington, but it still did not succeed as expected.

The idea of a railroad on the Eastern Shore of Virginia dated back to the 1853 when the North and South Railroad was chartered by the Virginia legislature. It never initiated construction and in 1878 the Peninsula Railroad of Virginia acquired the rights. In 1882 the NYP&N was created by consolidating the unfinished Peninsula Railroad Company of Maryland, the Peninsula Railroad of Virginia, The Eastern Shore Railroad Company (of Virginia) and the New York and Norfolk Railroad Company to create a railroad from the existing southern terminus at Pocomoke City to Norfolk.

The rail line to Pocomoke City had been built in stages, first by the Delaware Railroad, then by the Eastern Shore Railroad (ESR) and finally by the Worcester and Somerset Railroad (W&S) (which became the Peninsula Railroad Company of Maryland in 1880). The Delaware Railroad was only allowed to construct a rail line within the state of Delaware. After it reached Delmar in 1859, the 1835 charter of the ESR was revived and in 1866 - after the disruption of the Civil War - the ESR extended the line to Crisfield, Maryland where steamers connected it to Norfolk, as another attempt to shorten the route between Philadelphia and Norfolk. The W&S built a branch from a point on the ESR at Kings Creek, called New town Junction (later Peninsular Junction), to Pocomoke City in 1871 to try and serve more residents on the Eastern Shore.

Other companies consolidated into the NYP&N held rights but had built no rail. The Peninsula Railroad Company of Virginia was incorporated on March 12, 1878, and it was given all the rights given to the earlier North and South Railroad Company that had been incorporated on January 24, 1853. The Eastern Shore Railroad Company (of Virginia) was incorporated on April 23, 1867, and the New York and Norfolk Railroad Company was organized in Virginia on March 15, 1872.

The NYP&N was the vision of William Lawrence Scott, an Erie, Pennsylvania coal magnate, who wanted to build a shorter railroad route to the coal wharves of Hampton Roads by utilizing a ferry line across the Chesapeake Bay and a railroad line up the Delmarva Peninsula to the industrial north. His plan was to continue the rail line from Pocomoke City to Cherrystone, VA and use an innovative rail ferry - as opposed to unloading the rail cars - to reach Norfolk. He had the railroad incorporated in Maryland on April 10, 1880, and in Virginia on January 24, 1882. Scott enlisted engineering help from Pennsylvania Railroad Vice-president, Alexander J. Cassatt, who saw the merits of the plan and took a hiatus from PRR to work on the new line. Cassatt surveyed the line on horseback, designed ferries and wharves, and acquired the foundational railroads by purchasing the ESR in 1883 and the two Peninsula Railroads in 1884.

=== Construction ===
Work on the line south of Pocomoke City, and on a new bridge across the Pocomoke river, began in April 1884. Operations south to Drummondtown began in August and the railroad make brisk business shipping sweet potatoes. The line to what would become Cape Charles, just south of Cherrystone, was completed on October 25, 1884, and was perhaps the only line in the world ballasted with oyster shells. Along with it came the construction of a telegraph line and the dredging of the harbor at Cape Charles to allow barges in. Two weeks later the first passenger steamer, the Jane Moseley, left Cape Charles for Norfolk and the first through train ran on November 17, 1884. The steamers ran from Cape Charles to both Norfolk and Old Point Comfort. The next year the railroad started using barges, or car floats, to carry railroad cars to Norfolk via Port Norfolk (Portsmouth) where cars transferred to tracks owned by the Seaboard and Roanoke Railroad.

=== 19th Century Expansion ===
In 1886, they expanded steamer service to directly connect Cape Charles to Richmond, Virginia via the James River.

In 1890, the Baltimore, Chesapeake and Atlantic Railway built a railroad that connected to the NYP&N at Salisbury, Maryland and extended west to the Chesapeake at Claiborne, Maryland. That same year they purchased the Wicomico and Pocomoke Railroad (W&P) and consolidated it into one line. The W&P, which predated the NYP&N, also connected to the NYP&N at Salisbury but it extended east to the Atlantic at Ocean City.

In 1896, the railroad purchased several tracts of land at Pinners Point and other waterfront locations in Portsmouth and later built 0.71 miles of railroad there. The Southern Railway, Norfolk and Carolina and Atlantic and Danville bought adjacent land and together they built a massive rail transfer facility.

=== Reorganiation ===
Following an 1898 plan and vote, the company was reorganized without foreclosure or changing its name on January 24, 1899. As a result, the Philadelphia, Baltimore and Washington Railroad, which had been an early investor in the NYP&N, sold all of its interest in the company. At the same time the company got a boost shipping meat and ammunition south for the Spanish-American War.

=== 20th Century Expansion ===
In 1903, the NYP&N built a second track parallel to the existing one from Princess Anne to King's Creek.

In 1910 the line was extensively upgraded. The entire line was double-tracked with new interlocking switches and signals, many of the old wooden bridges were replaced with concrete culverts, a new shop was constructed at Cape Charles as was a concrete bulkhead (the 3rd of its kind in the country) and a concrete pier for coal. This allowed them to run heavier trains and so they purchased larger engines to run them. The railroad opened new stations at Mears and "Greenboat", a new depot in Lecato; made improvements to stations in Salisbury and Crisfield and expanded the rail yards at Delmar and Cape Charles.

=== Cape Charles Railroad ===
In September 1910, the Cape Charles Railroad (incorporated March 24, 1906) a subsidiary controlled by the NYP&N, began building a rail line from a point just east of Cape Charles, which became known as Cape Junction to Cape Charles Point. It opened the line to Townsend by December 1, 1910, and to Kiptopeke on March 8, 1912. This was the furthest south any railroad ever reached on the peninsula. The NYP&N purchased the Cape Charles Railroad's property, works and franchises on November 12, 1917.

=== Pennsylvania Railroad Merger ===
The NYP&N was always affiliated with the PRR which would eventually take control of it. In addition to the influence of Cassatt in the early uears, the PRR financed construction of the rail line and the NYP&N served as a feeder for the PRR. In 1908 the PRR purchased a controlling share of the NYP&N's stock. In 1918, the PRR merged the NYP&N's operations and traffic departments into its own, making it into a division of the PRR with its own corporate entity. In 1921 it took over operations with a 999-year lease and in 1922 it converted the railroad into the "Norfolk Division" of the Pennsylvania Railroad. When the PRR reorganized in 1930, The Norfolk Division became part of the Delmarva Division.

In 1940, the United States Army built Fort Winslow just south of Kiptopeke and the following summer, the PRR laid track into the fort.

=== Passenger service ===
Through the first half of the 20th century, several trains a day ran along the train line. From the 1920s to the 1950s, the PRR operated the day train, the Del-Mar-Va Express, and the night train, the Cavalier. At peak levels in the mid-1940s, the company also operated southbound, the Furlough, and an additional night train, the Mariner, in addition to unnamed local trains. Northbound the PRR added the Sailor, the Mariner night train, and an unnamed local train.

In 1926, the Easter Shore Transit Company was the first interstate bus line permitted to run the same route as the NYP&N. It ran between the Virginia state line and Salisbury, MD and it was the first of many that would pull transit passengers from the railroad.

The PRR began to scale back passenger service in 1949 when they closed several stations on the line, including Kiptopeke, Townsend, Capeville, Bayview, Weirwood, Keller, Melfa, Hopeton, Bloxom and Mears. The passenger ferry service from Cape Charles, run by the separate New York, Philadelphia and Norfolk Railroad Ferry Company, was shut down on March 1, 1953, when their ferry failed its Coast Guard inspection. The ferry between Kiptopeke and Little Creek, run by a separate company, remained. By 1957 all that remained of the train service was a once-a-day Philadelphia–Cape Charles train. In 1958, passenger rail south of Delmar ended.

=== Ferry service ===
The original ferry crossing was 36 miles. Both passenger and freight ferries existed. Up to 30 freight cars could be loaded on flat barges pulled by a tugboat for the trip. The original passenger ferries, Cape Charles & Old Point Comfort, side-wheeler paddle steamers, could hold an entire train on their two tracks. In 1889 the New York the first propeller-driven ship, 200 feet long, 31 feet beam was built for the run to Norfolk, and in 1890 the Pennsylvania, a larger vessel (260 feet long, 36 feet beam) was added. In 1907 the Maryland was built with the same dimensions, and the last ship was the Virginia Lee.

Because the NYP&N had trouble getting other railroads to interchange with it, it orchestrated the creation of the Norfolk & Portsmouth Belt Line Railroad in 1898, to serve as a "neutral" terminal switching company and interchange rail cars between the various competing railroads near the Elizabeth River.

In 1920 the operation of the ferry was transferred to the PRR, just as the rail lines were. 1926 the NYP&N built the Little Creek Extension and acquired tracking rights over Norfolk Southern Railroad from the Little Creek inlet, which cut the crossing distance to 26 miles.

n 1933, the Virginia Ferry Corporation, of which the PRR owned half, began running ferries between Kiptopoke and Little Creek.

In 1934 the New York, Philadelphia and Norfolk Railroad Ferry Company was incorporated, as a wholly owned subsidiary of the NYP&N (itself owned entirely by the PRR), to take over ferry operations from the railroad, which it did in 1935.

Ferry traffic peaked in 1944 due to World War II traffic, but traffic declined sharply to about 10% of the peak in 1950 due to competition from highways and airlines. In November 1952 the Cape Charles ferry boat was damaged by inclement weather and as a result of that damage, and its considerable age, it failed its Coast Guard Inspection on February 28, 1953, and ceased service. In April 1953, the railroads and ferry company applied for permission to abandon the ferry as both repair of the boat or replacement with a new one would be too expensive, and permission was granted in 1954.

Another ferry ran from Kiptopeke to Old Point Comfort.

In 1956, the Chesapeake Bay Ferry District purchased the Virginia Ferry Corporation, ending the railroad's involvement with ferries in the Bay.

In September 1960, the Old Point Comfort-Kiptopeke route was terminated due to low usage.

After the Chesapeake Bay Bridge-Tunnel opened in 1964 all ferry service from Kiptopeke ended and the ferries were sold (four of them to the Delaware River and Bay Authority to connect Lewes, DE to Cape May, NJ).

=== Demise ===
In 1956, the PRR and Norfolk Southern tried to get the planned Chesapeake Bay Bridge–Tunnel to include railroad tracks but were unsuccessful and when the tunnel opened in 1964 it dealt a serious blow to rail demand on the peninsula.

In 1968 the railroad moved with all of the other PRR properties to the Penn Central, where the NYP&N ceased as an entity. The Penn Central declared bankruptcy just two years later.

Penn Central abandoned the Cape Charles-Kiptopeke branch, which was down to two agricultural supply customers, in 1972. The Nature Conservancy purchased the abandoned right-of-way in 1985 and the track was removed.

After Southern Railway declined to buy the line, the remaining rail line became part of Conrail. Conrail made plans to abandon the rail line south of Pocomoke City but Northampton and Accomack counties leased the line south of there, along with the car float and the track and land at Little Creek in Virginia Beach. Over the years it moved operations between a series of short line railroads. The Virginia and Maryland Railroad operated freight service on it between Pocomoke City, Maryland, and Norfolk, Virginia from 1977 to 1981. In 1981 the Eastern Shore Railroad took over operations and, to keep the line running, Northampton and Accomack counties bought the line in 1986. In 2006, Cassatt Management, LLC. took over the ESHR and changed the name to the Bay Coast Railroad. It ceased operations on May 18, 2018, and the Delmarva Central Railroad took over operations a month later. It merged the line from Pocomoke City to Hallwood, Virginia into its Delmarva Subdivision and abandoned the line between Hallwood and Cape Charles as well as the car float. Service on the Norfolk side was taken over by the Buckingham Branch Railroad.

== Legacy ==
=== Railroad ===
The railroad from Delmar to Hammond is active rail line. The part south of Pocomoke City is owned by Canonie Atlantic Company, which is in turn owned by the Accomack-Northampton Transportation District Commission (A-NTDC). The line between Delmar and Pocomoke City is owned by Norfolk Southern as part of their Delmarva Subdivision; as is the Crisfield Industrial Track extending 1.2 miles south from Kings Creek. All of this is operated by the Delmarva Central Railroad.

=== Rail Trails ===
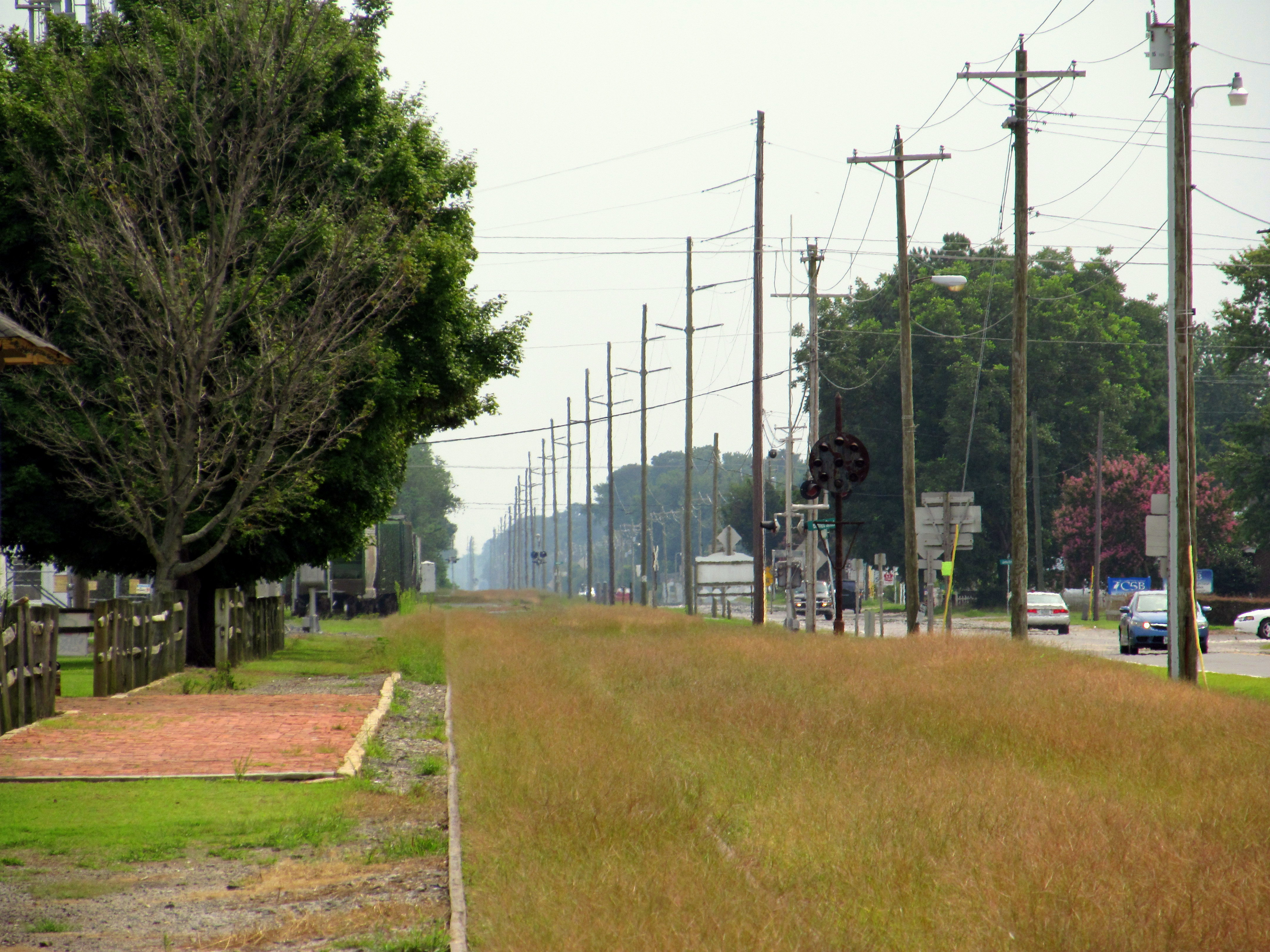
Abandoned right-of-way in Parksley, VA. Possible future route of the Eastern Shore of Virginia Rail Trail

The Surface Transportation Board approved the abandonment of the Hallwood-Cape Charles section on October 31, 2019, and in 2021 the state began removing the track. In 2020, VDOT produced a feasibility study for converting the 49 mile long right-of-way into a shared use path called the Eastern Shore of Virginia Rail Trail. VDOT started work on two segments of the trail, totaling 3.5 miles in length, in May 2025 and plan to complete it in Summer 2026.

The U.S. Fish and Wildlife Service oversees the Eastern Shore National Wildlife Refuge and has converted most of the right-of-way between Cape Charles and Kiptopeke into the Southern Tip Bike & Hike Trail and plans to build more. The Nature Conservancy donated part of the easement and land for the trail and the Service constructed 5 miles of trail, in two phases, in 2011 and 2019. The trail extends from the Eastern Shore of Virginia National Wildlife Refuge north to Capeville Road in Capeville, Virginia. Future phases are planned to extend the trail all the way to Cape Charles and may or may not use the right-of-way. Along this right-of-way, several bridges and culverts from the railroad remain.

The 15.1 mile long line from the end of the Crisfield Industrial Track to Crisfield was sold to the Maryland Department of Transportation as the Crisfield Secondary Branch in 1976. It was reserved in case a line to the deep water port in Crisfield was ever needed again and immediately abandoned. The last train, pulling eight San Luis Central ice reefers of onions for a local plant that produced frozen onion rings at the time, left Crisfield on April 4, 1976. The tracks were soon pulled up, the old freight station torn down and the line within MD 413 was replaced with a landscaped median. The right-of-west between 4th and Daugherty Creek in Crisfield was absorbed by adjacent landowners.

In 2018 the county began to turn the remaining right-of-way from E. Pear street in Crisfield to Westover, MD inta the Terrapin Run Recreational Trail. About 4.7 miles of the right-of-way from Crisfield to Marion were used to build phase 1 of the trail in 2019-21 and Somerset County started work on the 3.2 mile phase 2b, between the Big Annemessex River and Westover, in 2024 (with completion in 2027). Future phases will connect the two ends of the trail.

=== Ferry Barge ===
The Ferry Barge the Captain Edward Richardson, which launched as part of the NYP&N in 1948 and is still in use - though not to ferry railcars. After passing to Penn Central, the VAMD, the ESRR - which renamed it the Nandua - and the BCR it was taken out of service in 2012. In 2018 it was sold to a marine construction, dredging and marine services contractor.

=== Buildings ===
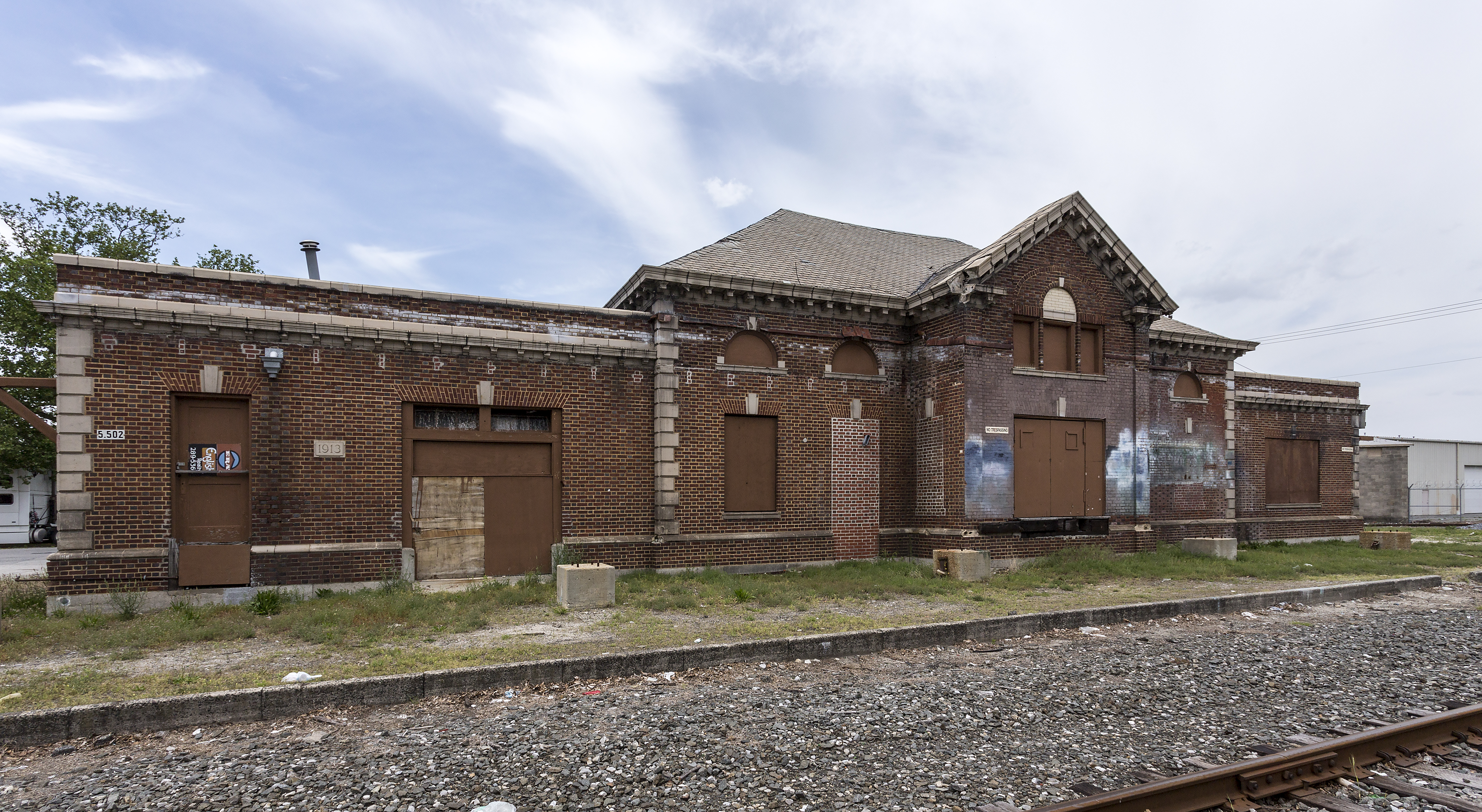
The former Salisbury Union Station

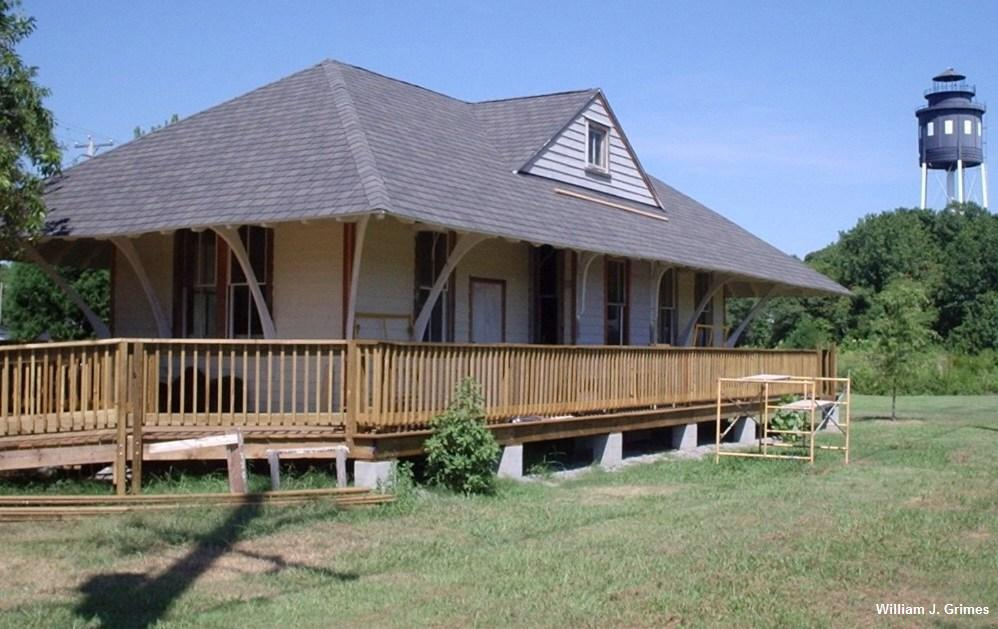
Replica of the Bloxom railroad station

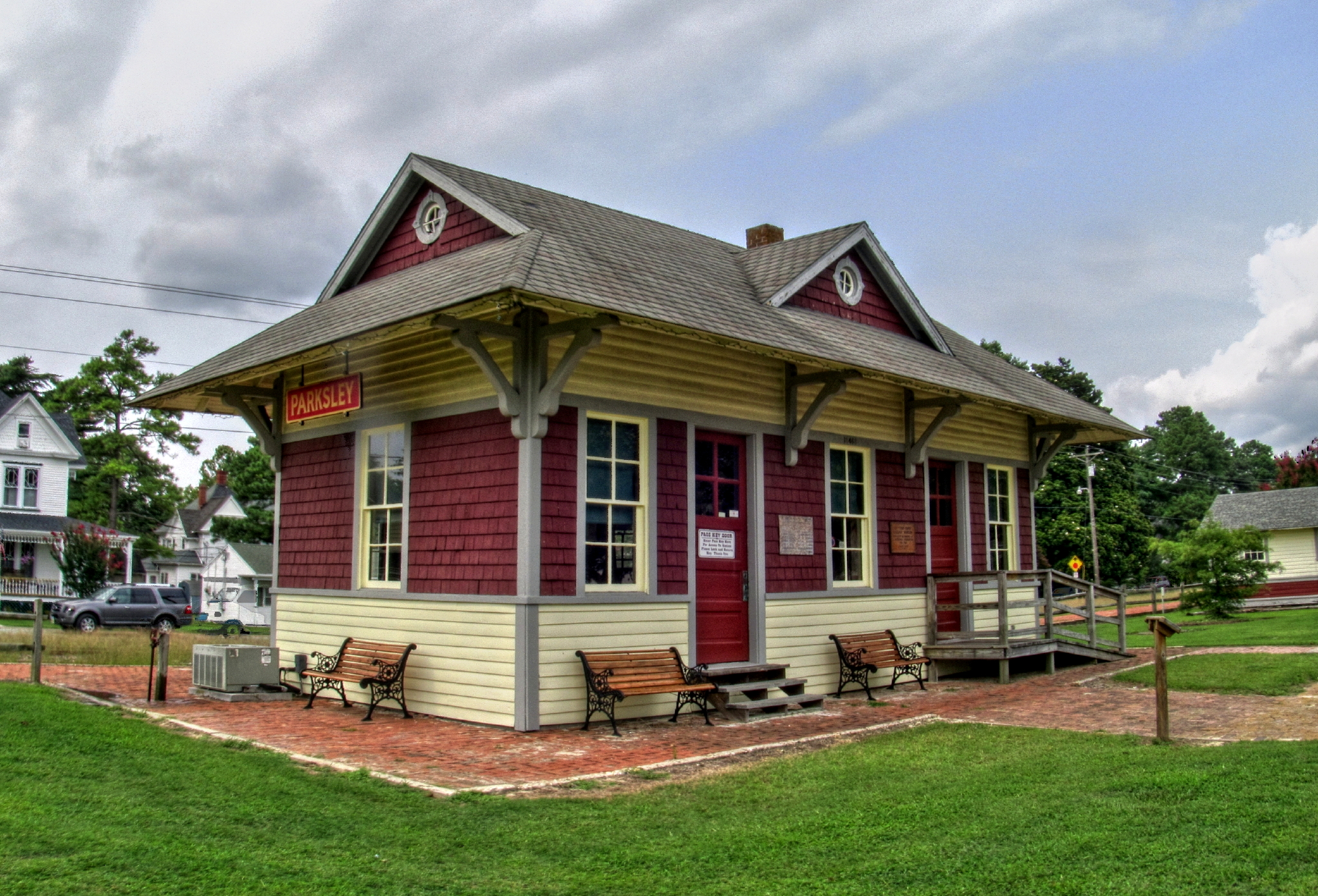
The former Hopeton, Virginia station

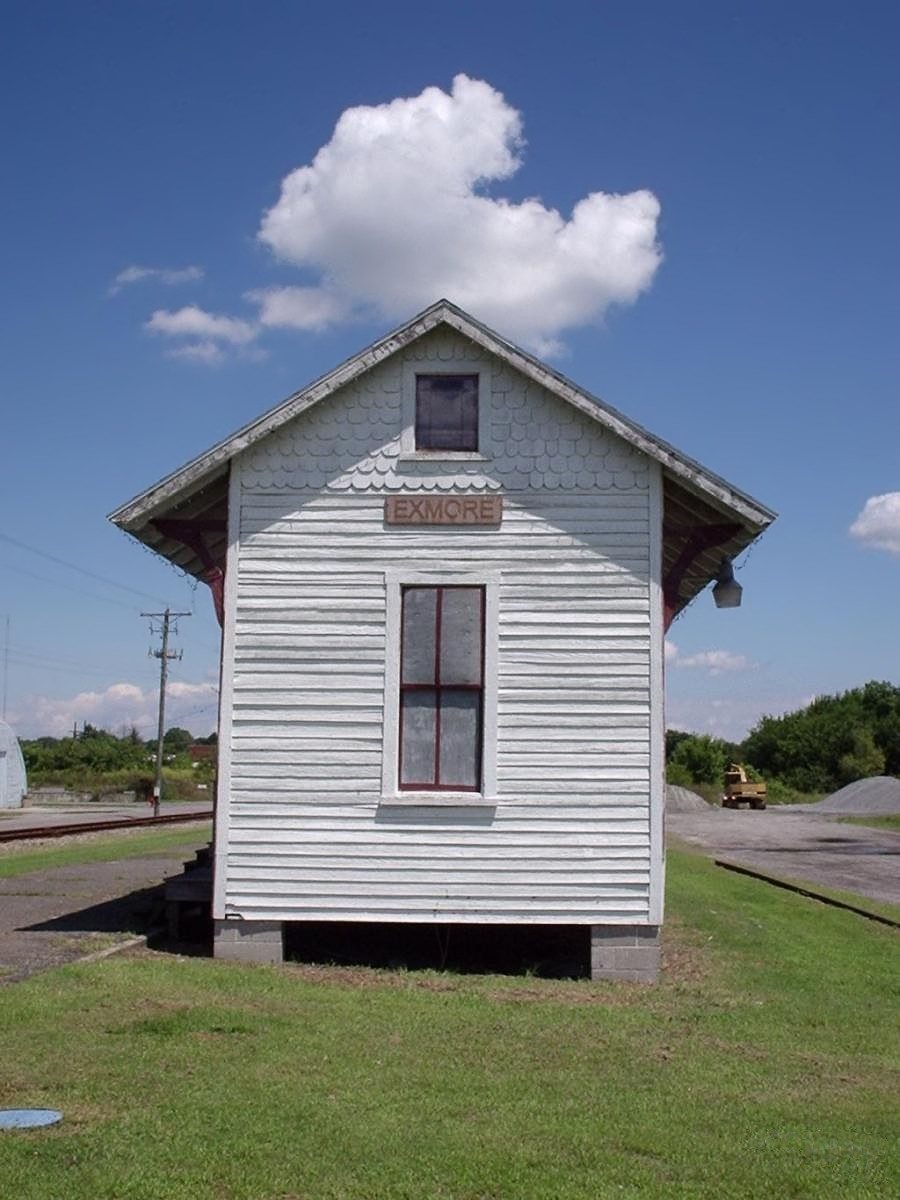
The former Belle Haven depot, now in nearby Exmore

Several stations remain

- Salisbury Union Station - used for commercial purposes.
- Bloxom railroad station - the Cape Charles Museum and Welcome Center built a replica of this station, including roof supports salvaged from the original building, next to their museum.
- Hopeton Train Station - The former Hopeton, Virginia station was donated to Parksley in 1988, moved there and restored as part of the Eastern Shore Railway museum.
- Onley Historic Train Station - was restored by a local historical group in 2011-15 and is now used by them.
- Belle Haven depot - Depot was moved to Exmore, Virginia, after the Exmore station was destroyed by fire
- Nassawadox depot - Depot was moved to Smith Beach, Virginia where it still stands.
- Cape Junction Depot - used to stand at Cape Junction where the Cape Railroad connected to the NYP&N line, was moved to a nearby farm.
- Townsend Railroad Depot - was moved from its original location.

The Cape Charles Museum and Welcome Center collection consists of thousands of photographs, documents and objects, many of which relate to the railroad. The 2nd pilot house from the barge Captain Edward Richardson,/Nandua is located on the grounds next door.

The Cape Charles Railroad yard was cleared for development and all of its contents sold, donated or scrapped.

The owner of the Capeville Station intentionally burned it down in 2018 after they were issued a dangerous structure notice from Northampton County, but the locked safe was salvaged for the Cape Charles Museum.

=== Rail Yards ===
The St. Julian's yard in Norfolk was sold by Canonie Atlantic Company (owned by the Accomack-Northampton Transportation District Commission (A-NTDC)) to the Virginia Passenger Rail Authority in 2022 which it uses to store Amtrak vehicles.

A-NTDC still owns the land and rail infrastructure at Little Creek, which is still in use, and the old rail yard in Cape Charles, which is not.

=== Ferry landings ===
The car float ferry landing in Virginia Beach at Little Creek Cove, built by the NYP&N, still exists on the grounds of the Little Creek Transload facility.

The ferry landing and former Virginia Ferry Corporation (VFC) land around it is now Kiptopeke State Park, with the landing now a fishing pier. Though it never moved rail cars VFC was a subsidiary of the railroad.

== See also ==
- Pennsylvania Railroad
- Bay Coast Railroad
- Eastern Shore of Virginia Rail Trail
- Train ferry: United States for a list of current and former car floats and train ferries
