= Virginia and Maryland Railroad =

The Virginia and Maryland Railroad Company (reporting mark VAMD) was a Class III short-line railroad that ran trains on the 96-mile (154 km) Pocomoke Secondary rail line, interchanging with the Norfolk Southern Railway at both ends. This was the former New York, Philadelphia and Norfolk Railroad line on the Delmarva Peninsula between Pocomoke City, Maryland, and Norfolk, Virginia. It took over operations from Conrail on March 30, 1977 when the Accomack-Northampton Transportation District Commission (A-NTDC) leased the line from the estate of the bankrupt Penn Central. It ceased operations in 1981 and was then replaced by the Eastern Shore Railroad.

== History ==
The rail line from Pocomoke City to Cape Charles, Virginia was built by the New York, Philadelphia and Norfolk Company (NYP&N) in 1884. At Cape Charles it built a freight depot, terminal and harbor at the headland point at. By 1885 it had built a car float system, using barges to cross the Chesapeake Bay to Norfolk. The Philadelphia, Baltimore and Washington Railroad (PB&WR) which was owned by the Pennsylvania Railroad (PRR), purchased the NYP&N in 1908 and in 1922 if became the "Norfolk Division" of the PRR. In 1929 the PRR built the little creek yard in the Little Creek area of Virginia Beach near the Norfolk/Virginia Beach line. It all became part of the Delmarva Division in 1930. In 1968 the PRR merged to become the Penn Central, which declared bankruptcy 2 years later. The rail line came under control of Conrail in 1976 and at the same time Northampton and Accomack counties created the Accomack-Northampton Transportation District Commission (A-NTDC) to maintain rail transportation along the line.

A-NTDC leased the line from Penn Central and arranged for the Virginia and Maryland Railroad (VAMD), to replace Conrail's operations on the Virginia portion of the Delmarva Peninsula in 1977. It operated over the 63.5 mile Delmarva main line from Pokomoke City to Cape Charles; a 26-mile freight car ferry across the Chesapeake Bay, and a 7-mile stretch from Little Creek, VA into Norfolk. Their first train on March 31, 1977 and normal freight operations started a few days later. As 4.9 miles of rail was in Maryland, Maryland shared its federal entitlement funds with Virginia to help subsidize it. in addition to serving local needs, the route was used by trains with high and wide loads as it was free of the clearance issues on the Northeast Corridor mainline. That arrangement lasted until 1981, when the Canonie Atlantic Company (entirely owned by A-NTDC) purchased the track from the Penn Central Estate and created the Eastern Shore Railroad (ESHR) (unaffiliated with a 19th Century railroad of the same name that built the line from Pocomoke City north to Delmar) to provide service on the line.

VAMD had visions of operating all over Delmarva after local authorities refused to sign a new contract with ConRail, which sought an increased subsidy, but the other rail line contracts in Maryland and Delaware went to other operators.
