= Eastern Shore Railroad =

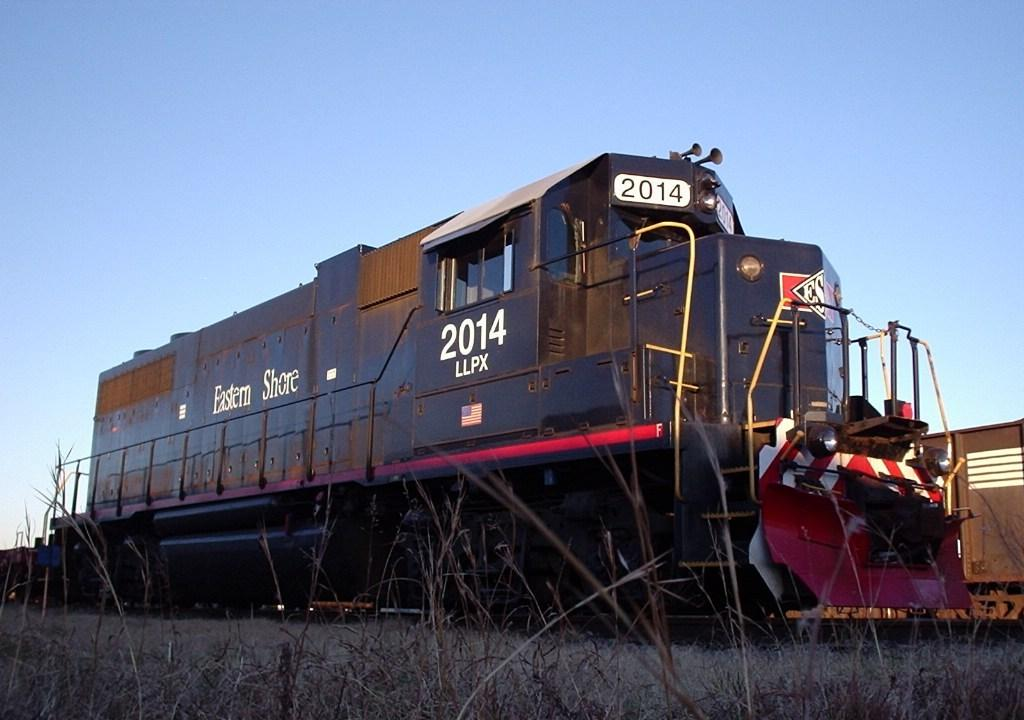

Overview
- Headquarters: Cape Charles, Virginia
- Reporting mark: ESHR
- Locale: Norfolk, Virginia to Pocomoke City, Maryland
- Dates of operation: 1981–2006
- Predecessor: Virginia and Maryland Railroad
- Successor: Bay Coast Railroad

Technical
- Track gauge: 4 ft 8 1/2 in (1,435 mm) standard gauge

The Eastern Shore Railroad, Inc. (reporting mark ESHR) was a Class III short-line railroad that ran trains on the 96-mile (154 km) former New York, Philadelphia and Norfolk Railroad line on the Delmarva Peninsula between Pocomoke City, Maryland, and Norfolk, Virginia, interchanging with the Norfolk Southern Railway at both ends. It took over from the Virginia and Maryland Railroad (VMR) in October 1981 when the Accomack-Northampton Transportation District Commission (A-NTDC) purchased the line from the VMR. It stopped operations in 2006 and was then replaced by the Bay Coast Railroad.

== History ==
The rail line from Pocomoke City to Cape Charles, Virginia was built by the New York, Philadelphia and Norfolk Company (NYP&N) in 1884. At Cape Charles it built a freight depot, terminal and harbor at the headland point at. By 1885 it had built a car float system, using barges to cross the Chesapeake Bay to Norfolk. The Philadelphia, Baltimore and Washington Railroad (PB&WR) which was owned by the Pennsylvania Railroad (PRR), purchased the NYP&N in 1908 and in 1922 if became the "Norfolk Division" of the PRR. In 1929 the PRR built the little creek yard in the Little Creek area of Virginia Beach near the Norfolk/Virginia Beach line. It all became part of the Delmarva Division in 1930. In 1968 the PRR merged to become the Penn Central, which then declared bankruptcy 2 years later. The rail line then came under control of Conrail in 1976 and at the same time Northampton and Accomack counties created the Accomack-Northampton Transportation District Commission (A-NTDC).

A-NTDC arranged for the Virginia and Maryland Railroad, to replace Conrail's operations in 1977. That arrangement lasted until 1981, when the Canonie Atlantic Company purchased the track and created the Eastern Shore Railroad (ESHR) (unaffiliated with a 19th Century railroad of the same name that built the line from Pocomoke City north to Delmar) to provide service from the Maryland border to Little Creek.

In 1986, the ESHR sought to abandon the railroad south of Pocomoke City. But the next year A-NTDC purchased Canonie Atlantic and kept it operating.

In February 2006 Cassatt Management, LLC. took over the ESHR. As part of the deal they agreed not to use the Eastern Shore name and so they renamed it the Bay Coast Railroad. The Bay Coast Railroad operated the line until May 18, 2018. In June 2018, the Delmarva Central Railroad took over the portion between Pocomoke City and Hallwood, Virginia where the remaining customers were located. Service on the Norfolk side was taken over by the Buckingham Branch Railroad. Service on the Norfolk side was taken over by the Buckingham Branch Railroad.

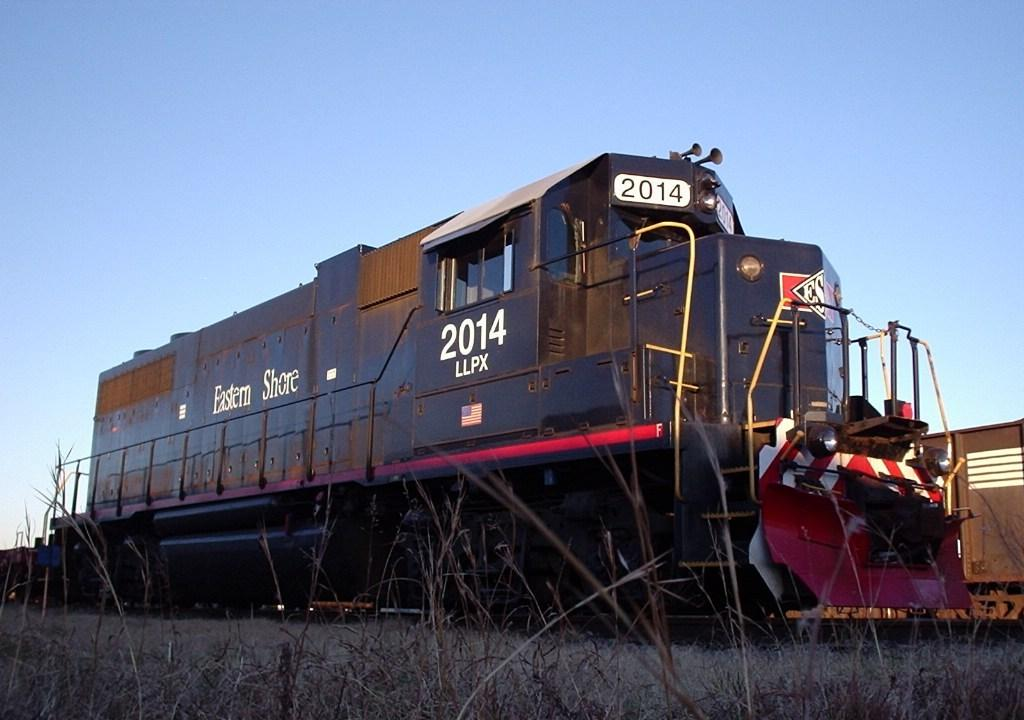
LLPX 2014, a leased EMD GP38, was used for switching the ferry terminal in Little Creek, Virginia.

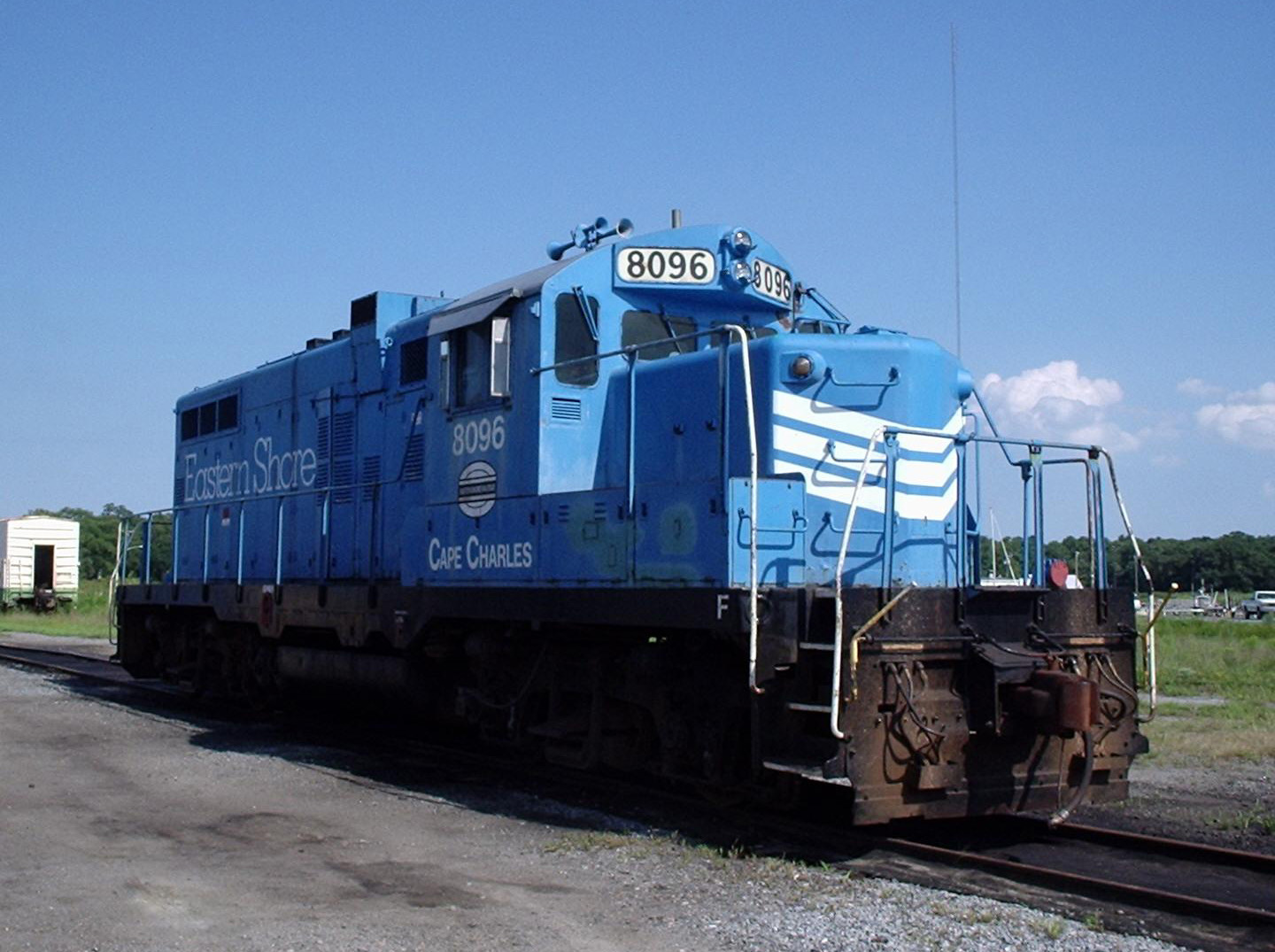
ESHR 8096, a GP10, named the "Cape Charles" was parked at the headquarters in Cape Charles, VA.

== 19th Century Eastern Shore Railroad ==
Another railroad under the name of the Eastern Shore Railroad was chartered in Maryland in 1835 and built a railroad line from Delmar, Delaware to Crisfield, Maryland in 1866 and a branch to Pocomoke City, Maryland in 1871. It was foreclosed on in 1879 and acquired by the New York, Philadelphia and Norfolk Railroad in 1884. It is unrelated to the 20th century Eastern Shore Railroad.

== See also ==
- Train ferry: United States for a list of current and former car floats and train ferries
- Bay Coast Railroad
