= Bay Coast Railroad =

Overview
- Headquarters: Cape Charles, Virginia
- Reporting mark: BCR
- Locale: Norfolk, Virginia to Pocomoke City, Maryland
- Dates of operation: 2006–2018
- Predecessor: Eastern Shore Railroad
- Successor: Delmarva Central Railroad and Buckingham Branch Railroad

Technical
- Track gauge: 4 ft 8 1/2 in (1,435 mm) standard gauge
- Length: 70 miles (110 km)

Other
- Website: http://baycoastrailroad.com

The Bay Coast Railroad (reporting mark BCR) was a Class III short-line railroad that ran trains on the 96-mile (154 km) former New York, Philadelphia and Norfolk Railroad line on the Delmarva Peninsula between Pocomoke City, Maryland, and Norfolk, Virginia, interchanging with the Norfolk Southern Railway (NSR) at both ends. It took over from the Eastern Shore Railroad (ESHR) in 2006. It ceased operations on the Delmarva line around 2012 and leased part of the line to Delmarva Central Railroad in 2016. In 2018 it filed to cease operations entirely, handed operations of the Delmarva line from Pocomoke City, MD to Hallwood, VA to the Delmarva Central Railroad (DCR), handing Little Creek-Norfolk operations to the Buckingham Branch Railroad and abandoning the line from Hallwood to Cape Charles, VA.

== History ==
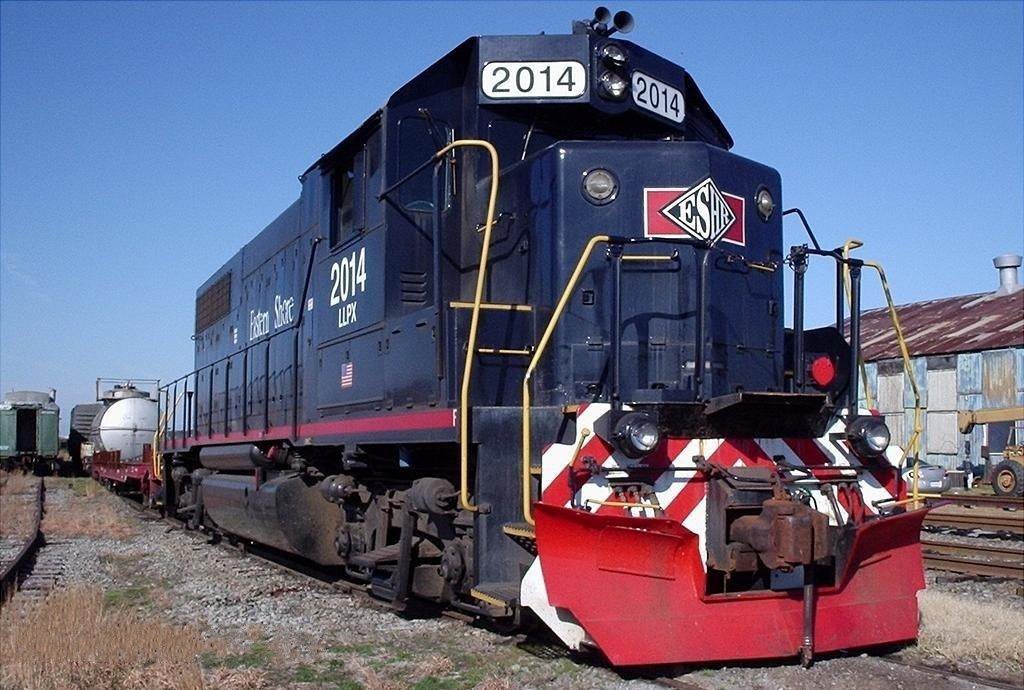
LLPX 2014 was leased to Bay Coast Railroad at the ferry terminal in Little Creek, Virginia.

The rail line from Pocomoke City to Cape Charles, Virginia was built by the New York, Philadelphia and Norfolk Company (NYP&N) in 1884. At Cape Charles it built a freight depot, terminal and harbor at the headland point at. By 1885 it had built a car float system, using barges to cross the Chesapeake Bay to Norfolk. The Philadelphia, Baltimore and Washington Railroad (PB&WR) which was owned by the Pennsylvania Railroad (PRR), purchased the NYP&N in 1908 and in 1922 if became the "Norfolk Division" of the PRR. In 1929 the PRR built the little creek yard in the Little Creek area of Virginia Beach near the Norfolk/Virginia Beach line. It all became part of the Delmarva Division in 1930. In 1968 the PRR merged to become the Penn Central, which then declared bankruptcy 2 years later. The rail line then came under control of Conrail in 1976.

Northampton and Accomack counties created the Accomack-Northampton Transportation District Commission (A-NTDC) in 1976 and it arranged for the Virginia and Maryland Railroad to replace Conrail's operations in 1977. That arrangement lasted until 1981, when the Canonie Atlantic Company purchased the track on the Eastern Shore and created the Eastern Shore Railroad (ESHR) (unaffiliated with a 19th Century railroad of the same name that built the line from Pocomoke City north to Delmar) to replace it. The railroad also leased 4 miles of NSR track between Virginia Beach and Norfolk. In 1986, A-NTDC purchased Canonie Atlantic to keep the struggling ESHR operating on the line.

In 2005, Cassatt Management, LLC was selected as the new operator and in February 2006 Cassatt took over the ESHR. As part of the deal they agreed not to use the Eastern Shore name and so they renamed it the Bay Coast Railroad.

== Operations ==
BCR had three distinct operating areas. The 64.1-mile (103.2 km) northern portion of its rail system connects with the Delmarva Central Railroad in Pocomoke City (north) and the system's car float in Cape Charles, Virginia. A car float, crossing 26 miles (42 km) of the Chesapeake Bay from Cape Charles to Norfolk, comprises the middle portion. The southern end of the system is a terminal track around Little Creek, Virginia, connecting with Norfolk Southern Railway, CSX Transportation, and the Norfolk and Portsmouth Belt Line Railroad.

At the regular meeting of the Accomack-Northampton Transportation District Commission held at the Eastern Shore Chamber of Commerce Building, Melfa, Virginia, on Monday, November 6, 2017, at 5:30 p.m., BCR President Alex Parry "reported that the DCP traffic (butane) has been lost from the Little Creek side; however, he is hopeful that other new traffic will be realized to fill the void." DCP traffic amounted to approximately 75% of the carloads handled by the railroad. In January 2018 the BCR suffered another loss when customer Bayshore Concrete announced it was putting its Cape Charles plant up for sale in the wake of declining business.

=== Chesapeake Bay car float ===
BCR used two tug boat-guided railroad car floats of 25 and 15 car capacity to link the 26-mile (42 km) water route across the Chesapeake Bay between Cape Charles and Norfolk — using the north and south terminals of the now defunct Little Creek-Cape Charles Ferry. This car float operation had been in continuous service since April 1885, and was one of only three remaining in the United States, the others being New York New Jersey Rail, LLC, and the Alaska Railroad's rail barge service from Seattle to Whittier. In late March 2014 VP for operations Larry LeMond stated the railroad had not run the barge for more than a year and a half and had no intention to resume the service. He also stated that all of the railroad's traffic comes into Pocomoke City to the north and the company operates every other day. An article in Delmarva Now online dated January 14, 2019 noted that the minutes of the Accomack-Northampton Transportation District Commission meeting of December 4, 2018 stated, "The rail car barge Nandua has been sold." The buyer, Iron Planet, seeks to sell it for $200,000.

=== Bay Creek Railway ===
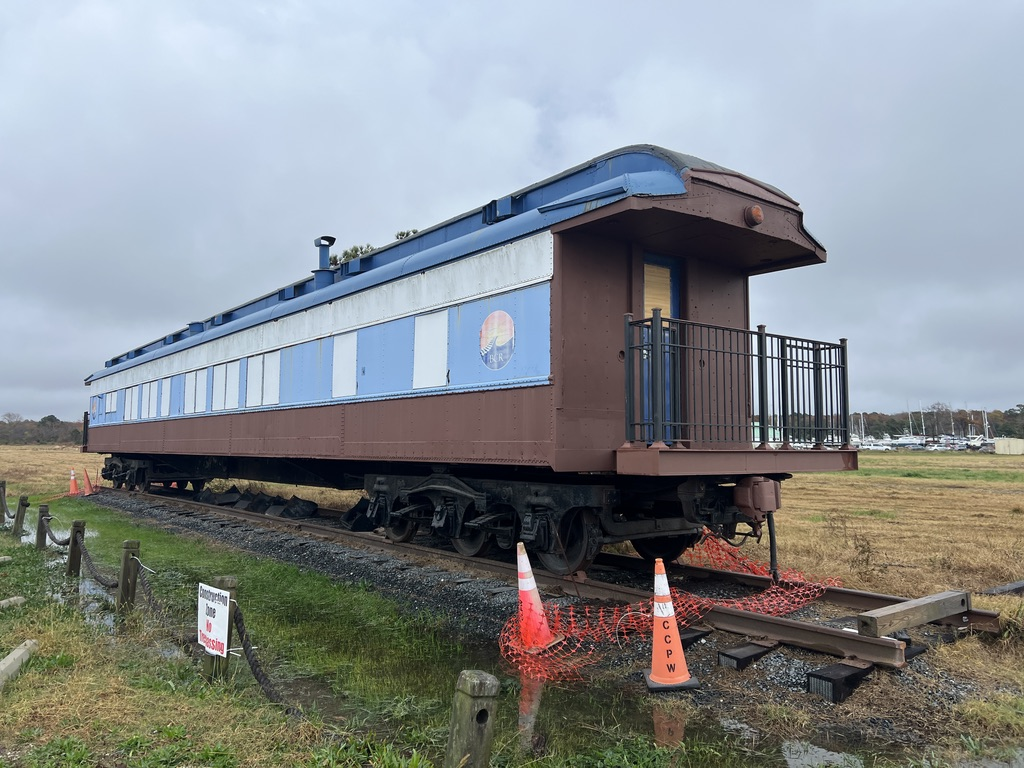
A view of an old Bay Coast Railroad passenger car on display in Cape Charles, Virginia.

In 2007, Bay Creek Railway began operating a self-propelled dining car along BCR track, making one- to two-hour round trips from Cape Charles. This passenger excursion service used a restored interurban railcar built in 1913 by St. Louis Car Company. It originally served the former Texas Electric Railway in Dallas, Texas as car number 316. When Texas Electric ceased operating in 1948, its fleet of interurban railcars was sold for salvage. Car number 316 was used as a cabin at a ranch in Fort Worth, Texas until its restoration for the Bay Creek Railway. By December 21, 2011, the car was listed for sale on the Ozark Mountain Railcar equipment broker website. The initial asking price was $260,000, later reduced to $205,000. The dining car was eventually sold, loaded onto a flat bed trailer and departed Cape Charles on March 11, 2014. It is now on the Wisconsin Great Northern Railroad, a tourist line in Trego, Wisconsin.

=== Locomotive roster ===
Locomotive number	Model	Type	Propulsion	Manufacturer
400	EMD GP15-1	Four-axle road switcher	Diesel	GM Electro-Motive Division
2000	EMD GP10	Four-axle road switcher	Diesel	GM Electro-Motive Division
2001	EMD GP10	Four-axle road switcher	Diesel	GM Electro-Motive Division
2014	EMD GP38	Four-axle road switcher	Diesel	GM Electro-Motive Division
2085	ALCO MRS-1	Military road switcher	Diesel	American Locomotive Company
2090	ALCO MRS-1	Military road switcher	Diesel	American Locomotive Company

Note: No. 400 was acquired by the Minnesota-based Northern Lines Railway and repainted in Cascade green by Mid-America Car in Kansas City, Missouri.

Note: Both GP10 2000 and 2001 were out of service by the time of the railroad's closure. 2000 had a set of trucks swapped with GP38 2014 in August 2013 and appeared to be missing a compressor. 2001 was missing a set of trucks. No. 2001, dormant for over a decade, was cut up for scrap on January 18, 2019.

Note: In August 2018 leased locomotive LLPX 2014 was moved to the Cape May Seashore Lines in New Jersey.

Note: Both MRS1 locomotives, out of service for many years, were scrapped on site in 2011.

=== End of operations ===
On May 18, 2018, the Bay Coast Railroad ran their last train before ceasing operations. Leased locomotive LLPX 2014 was out of service so the BCR leased an EMD GP11 numbered 2005 from the Delmarva Central Railroad to pull the last train to the interchange with the DCR. LLPX 2014 was moved "dead in tow."

In June 2018, the Delmarva Central Railroad took over the portion between Pocomoke City and Hallwood, Virginia where the remaining customers were located. Service on the Norfolk side was taken over by the Buckingham Branch Railroad.

== Legacy ==
When the railroad ceased operations, it offered to donate any artifacts, including railroad cars, that could be moved within 90 days. The Cape Charles Historical Society acquired five railroad cars, including the 2000 locomotive from the Bay Coast Railroad. The cars were moved from the Cape Charles railroad yard eastward to a point beyond the hump adjacent to the museum. Locomotive 2001 was demolished for scrap. One car is on display west of the museum, behind the Cape Charles Brewing Company. Some of the rolling stock has been put on display at the Cape Charles Museum and Visitor Center. Remaining rolling stock, such as flatcars and ex-Southern Railway gondolas built in the 1930s and 1940s, was offered for donation to railroad museums.

On May 22, 2025 ground was broken on the first two sections of the Eastern Shore of Virginia Rail Trail, an eventually 49-mile long rail trail from Cape Charles to Hallwood.

== See also ==
- Train ferry: United States for a list of current and former car floats and train ferries
