= Eastern Shore of Virginia Rail Trail =

Cycling path under construction in Virginia, United States

- Length: 2.2 miles (3.5 km) (open); 49.1 miles (79.0 km) (planned)
- Location: Eastern Shore of Virginia, United States
- Established: August 20, 2026
- Trailheads: North: Hallwood (planned); Cheriton (open); South: Cape Charles (open)
- Use: Hiking, Biking
- Surface: Asphalt
- Website: esrailtrail.com

The Eastern Shore of Virginia Rail Trail is a partially-complete separated and paved bicycle and pedestrian rail trail on the Eastern Shore of Virginia. Currently open for two miles within the town limits of Cape Charles, it will eventually run 49.1 miles (79.0 km) to Hallwood, following the right of way of the abandoned Bay Coast Railroad in Northampton and Accomack Counties.

Construction on the first 2.2 miles of the trail, running from downtown Cape Charles to U.S. Route 13 and Cheriton, completed in August 2026 after sixteen months of construction.

Funding has been secured for the next segment, from Cheriton to Birdnest, and construction is expected to start in early 2027.

== See also ==
- Cycling infrastructure
- Virginia Capital Trail
- Washington & Old Dominion Trail
- Southern Tip Bike & Hike Trail
