= Delmarva Division =

Railroads in Delaware, Maryland and Virginia

The Delmarva Division is the set of railroads on the Delmarva Peninsula of Delaware, Maryland and Virginia that were part of the Pennsylvania Railroad (PRR) through most of the 20th Century. The lines were built by several different companies and then eventually consolidated under the control of the PRR and later the Penn Central Railroad. Throughout the 20th Century some of the rail lines were abandoned and following the bankruptcy of Penn Central and break-up on Conrail ownership changed many times.

== Creation ==
The first section of rail that would eventually become the Delmarva Division was built by the Delaware Railroad with financing from the Philadelphia, Wilmington, and Baltimore Railroad. The line was built from a junction with the New Castle and Frenchtown Railroad in Porter, Delaware, to Dover, Delaware, in 1855. It was extended to Seaford, Delaware, in 1856. The PW&B leased the railroad starting the next year. It was extended to the Maryland state line at Delmar, Delaware in 1859.

In 1857, the Junction and Breakwater Railroad (J&B) built a "junction" with the Delaware Railroad in Harrington, DE and by 1859 it had reached Milford, DE. Work was stalled by the Civil War but resumed in 1867 and the line was completed to Lewes, DE and the Delaware Breakwater, via Georgetown, by 1869. By 1878 it had built a 5-mile extension to Rehoboth. In Rehoboth it eventually built connections to Canneries along the canal, factories along Laurel Street, a passenger station on Rehoboth avenue and a wye that connected to Henlopen Junction.

The Delaware Railroad was only allowed to construct a rail line within the state of Delaware. After it reached Delmar in 1859, the 1835 charter of the Eastern Shore Railroad was revived and the Eastern Shore RR extended the line to Crisfield, Maryland in 1866 and built a branch to Pocomoke City, Maryland in 1871.

On May 22, 1874, the Breakwater & Frankford Railroad (B&F) opened a connection to the J&B at Georgetown that ran from Georgetown to the Maryland line at Selbyville, DE just south of Frankford,DE.

By 1876, the Worcester Railroad had connected to the B&F at Selbyville and extended the line to Franklin City, Virginia.

In 1879 the Eastern Shore Railroad was foreclosed on and acquired by the New York, Philadelphia and Norfolk Railroad (NYP&N) which built an extension from Pocomoke City to Cape Charles, Virginia in 1884.

On August 29, 1897 the Queen Anne's Railroad connected its line from Queenstown, MD (which first opened in 1896) to the J&B (now part of DMVR) line at Ellendale, DE and extended it to Milton, DE. On March 1, 1898, service was extended to Lewes, DE where it connected to a terminal that allowed passengers to catch a ferry to Cape May.

In 1957, the Indian River Power station east of Millsboro, Delaware was opened and along with it a 2.5 mile industrial spur that joined with the Pennsylvania with a wye from the line between Dagsboro and Millsboro.

== Consolidation ==
=== Delaware, Maryland and Virginia Railroad ===
In 1883 the J&B, B&F and Worcester railroads merged to form the Delaware, Maryland and Virginia Railroad (DMVR). In 1891 the DMVR defaulted on two mortgages and was taken over by the Philadelphia, Wilmington and Baltimore Railroad at the request of the Delaware General Assembly.

=== Pennsylvania Railroad ===
==== Philadelphia, Wilmington and Baltimore Railroad ====
In 1881, the PRR purchased the PW&B, bringing the Delaware Railroad under its control.

In March 1891, the DMVR approached default on two mortgages totaling $600,000 and so the PW&BR took control of the company and added its trackage to the Delmarva Division. The Delaware General Assembly met with DMVR directors and those of the PW&BR in order to avoid the default and keep the rail lines open. DMVR shareholders remained minority owners of the line until 1919, when they were unable to meet financial obligations, and the minority shares were sold to the PRR.

==== Baltimore and Eastern Railroad ====
The QAR went bankrupt in 1904. On January 28, 1905 the PRR created a new company, the Maryland, Delaware and Virginia Railway Company (MD&V), to acquirer the QAR. Two days later it was placed under the control of the Baltimore, Chesapeake and Atlantic Railway (BC&A) and the two were operated as twins. The "Virginia" in the railroad's name likely referred to the line's steamer routes which operated in Virginia waters.

The MD&V lost money every single year except for 1910 and 1911. As a result, the PRR sold it and all of its properties in May 1923 to the E. B. Leaf Company, which split the assets at West Denton, DE and sold it off. E.B. Leaf sold the western portion, from Love Point to West Denton, MD to the Baltimore and Eastern Railroad (B&ER) a subsidiary of the BC&A, and thus the PRR. The east section was sold to a new company, the Maryland and Delaware Coast Railroad.

In 1928, the BC&A was merged into the B&ER.

In 1934, the successor to the Maryland and Delaware Coast Railroad, the Maryland and Delaware Seacoast Railroad, went bankrupt and filed to abandon the entire line from West Denton to Lewes. PRR took control of the railroad, sold the West Denton to Denton section to the B&ER; sold the Ellendale to Milton section, known as the Milton Industrial Track, to the DMVR and abandoned the sections from Denton to Ellendale and from Milton to Lewes.

==== Philadelphia, Baltimore and Washington ====
In 1902, the PRR merged the PW&B with the Baltimore and Potomac Railroad to create the Philadelphia, Baltimore and Washington Railroad (PB&W) and PB&W branded trains began running on the Delmarva Division.

In 1921, the PB&W acquired the NYP&N and added it to the Delmarva Division.

The Pennsylvania Railroad passenger trains operated along the route until the late 1960s, stopping at towns just a few miles inland from resort towns on the eastern coast of the Delmarva Peninsula. Frequency along the route dwindled from three trains in each direction in the early 1910s to one train a day in each direction in 1941.

Branches were abandoned and passenger service was scaled back. Most passenger service ended in the 1940s. By 1957 all that remained was a once-a-day Philadelphia–Cape Charles train. In 1958, the route was shortened: from Philadelphia to Delmar. The last train was a Wilmington–Delmar train, called the Blue Diamond which last ran in 1965.

=== Penn Central ===
In 1968, the PRR and its longtime rival New York Central Railroad merged to form the Penn Central and trains were run on the division by the new entity for a few years; but the Penn Central declared bankruptcy in 1970/ Penn Central continued to operate trains in bankruptcy until 1976, when the company's railroad assets were sold To Conrail.

=== Conrail and Separation ===
Conrail took over the assets of Penn Central and the B&ER, which had never joined Penn Centrail, on April 1, 1976. It quickly set about shedding unprofitable lines, breaking the system up between several owners and abandoning some parts.

==== Denton Branch ====
The section of the B&ER from Queenstown, MD to Queen Anne, MD was left off the Conrail system plan and abandoned, but the section from Queen Anne to Denton was purchased by the Maryland Department of Transportation.

==== Crisfield Industrial Track ====
The Crisfield Industrial Track, the old Eastern Shore Rail line from King's Creek Junction just north of the Manokin River to Crisfield, was never conveyed to Conrail. Instead it was sold to MDOT in 1976. Everything on the line south of US 13 was abandoned immediately and the last train, pulling eight San Luis Central ice reefers of onions for a local plant that produced frozen onion rings at the time, left Crisfield on April 4, 1976. The tracks were soon pulled up and the old freight station torn down.

About two miles of track from King's Junction to US-13 is still in use, owned by MDOT and operated by the DCR to serve a chicken processing plant on Revells Neck Road. The rest is in the process of being converted into a rail trail.

The line from Clayton to Smyrna was also abandoned without conveying to Conrail.

==== Lewes Running Track and Milton Industrial Tracks ====
In 1981, Conrail announced plans to abandon the Lewes Running Track, the railroad between Georgetown and Lewes, and the Milton Industrial Track between Ellendale and Milton.. Rather than see rail service on those lines end or subsidize Conrail, DelDOT purchased them. Investors incorporated the Delaware Coast Line Railroad (DCLR) in 1982 to serve the DelDOT owned lines, and it was then hired by DelDOT to do that.

In the 1990s a dinner train operated on the track between Nassau and Lewes, branded as the "Queen Anne's Railroad." The dinner train's center of operations was at the former Lewes, Delaware station. Passenger cars were pulled by a USATC S100 Class 0-6-0 tank locomotive, produced for the US Army in World War II. The last passenger train service to Lewes was in 2007.

In 1994 DelDOT formed the Delaware Transit Corporation (DTC) to manage its rail lines and it awarded the Maryland & Delaware Railroad (MDDE) a five-year contract to operate on the two lines, taking them from the DCLR. But in 1999, the MDDE did not seek renewal of the Delaware contract and DelDOT returned operation of the two lines to DCLR.

Also in 1999, the Draper-King Cole Cannery located just east of Chestnut St in Milton, the only customer on the Milton I.T. went out of business and DTC leased the track to Norfolk Southern (NS) which used it to store Purdue's grain cars. DCLR restarted operations on the Milton Industrial Track in 2010 for use by a propane facility on the west side of Milton but the portion of track between Gravel Hill Road/MD-30 and downtown Milton was abandoned.

In September 2016, DelDot closed the swing bridge over the Lewes and Rehoboth Canal to rail traffic. A survey found that it had sunk 7-8 inches due to settlement in the canal and some pieces of timber had split. It was declared structurally unsound. In 2017, DelDOT determined that repairs to the swing bridge would be too costly and that they would abandon the line from Lewes to Cool Spring Road. Two to three trains a month had gone to the SPI Pharma plant near Cape Henlopen until the canal bridge was closed. Following the decision to abandon the bridge, a train pulled the last tank cars out on December 15, 2017, ending train service to Lewes. The line was decommissioned in 2018 and the tracks east of the Allen Harim Poultry Plant in Harbeson were removed that year.

In early 2018, DCLR again lost its contract to serve what remained of the lines and DelDOT awarded it to the Delmarva Central Railroad (DCR). On January 1, 2019, DCR extended its existing operations to include DelDOT's tracks. DCLR then exited the railroad business and sold off its equipment.

==== Mardella Industrial Track ====
The Mardella Industrial Track, a remnant of the Baltimore, Chesapeake and Atlantic Railway west of Salisbury, was broken into two pieces after the Conrail merger. One piece consisting of a little over a mile of track in Salisbury from south of Naylor street, diverging west along Wilson and then crossing Johnsons Pond, came into ownership of Norfolk Southern. The other, a continuation of the line across Johnsons Pond to Quantico Creek southeast of Hebron, Maryland was sold to MDOT. The MDOT owned portion was pulled up and the Norfolk Southern portion is inactive.

==== Mill Street Industrial Track ====
The Mill Street Industrial Track branches off of the Mardella I.T. at a junction between W. Isabella Street and Weldon Place in Salisbury, Maryland and runs for about 2,500 feet to a point just north of W.Salisbury Place/Ocean Gateway/US-50. It is owned by Norfolk Southern, but is inactive.

==== Southern Delmarva Subdivision ====
Also in 1981 the Canonie Atlantic Company purchased the 96 miles of track from Pocomoke City to Norfolk and created the Eastern Shore Railroad, unaffiliated with the one that built the line south of Delmar, to operate it. In 1987, after failing to turn a profit, the Accomack-Northampton Transportation District Commission (A-NTDC), a dual-county government board, purchased all of the stock in Canonie Atlantic.

In February 2016, the struggling Eastern Shore Railroad was taken over by Cassatt Management, LLC., and it was renamed the Bay Coast Railroad. But the Bay Coast Railroad also could not make money and so it ceased operations on May 18, 2018. In June 2018, the Delmarva Central Railroad took over the portion between Pocomoke City and Hallwood, Virginia, which became part of the Delmarva Subdivision, and Canonie Atlantic applied to abandon the 49.1 miles of track from Hallwood to Cape Charles. Service on the Norfolk side was taken over by the Buckingham Branch Railroad. The Surface Transportation Board approved the abandonment of the Hallwood-Cape Charles section on 31 October 2019. In 2020, VDOT produced a feasibility study for converting the railroad into a shared use path. Work on two segments totally 3.5 miles is expected to start in Spring 2025 and complete in Summer 2026.

==== Snow Hill Branch ====
The line from Frankford, DE to Snow Hill, MD - the Snow Hill Branch - was sold to the Snow Hill Shippers Association, a group of businesses that relied on the line, in 1982. Snow Hill Shippers hired the Maryland and Delaware Railroad (MDDE) to operate it.

In 2000 the MDDE acquired the Snow Hill Branch (or Snow Hill Line) from the Snow Hill Shippers Association. In 2025, the MDDE and its Snow Hill Branch was sold to Carload Express.

==== Delmarva Subdivision and Indian River Subdivision ====
In 1999 Conrail sold most of the Delmarva Division track to Norfolk Southern (NS). NS bought the old Delaware Railroad/New York, Philadelphia and Norfolk Railroad line from Porter, DE to Pocomoke City, MD, which it called the Delmarva Subdivision (sometimes known as the Delmarva Secondary or Delmarva Sub) and the line that branches off from that at Harrington and runs to Frankford, which it called the Indian River Subdivision, naming it after the Indian River Power Plant.

In 2016, Norfolk Southern turned operation of the Delmarva and Indian River Subdivisions to the Delmarva Central Railroad.

=== Current Ownership and Operations ===
Today, the Delmarva Central Railroad operates the Delmarva Subdiviaion, owned mostly by NS but partly by Canonie Atlantic/A-NTDC; the Indian River Subdivisions, owned by NS; and the Milton Industrial Track and the remaining Lewes Running Track, both owned by DelDOT. The Snow Hill Branch Line is owned and operated by the MDDE.

== Contraction ==
In the mid-1940's the railroad bridge across the Lewes and Rehoboth Canal in Rehoboth was removed and service terminated east of the canal.

Passenger service on the Division was eliminated in 1949.

In 1956, the PRR abandoned the tracks between the Maryland-Virginia line and Franklin City, Virginia.

In the 1970s, Penn Central abandoned the rail line between Lewes and Rehoboth Beach.

Freight service continued to run to Lewes, where it served the SPI Pharma plant near Cape Henlopen with two to three transports a month, until September 2016 when DelDOT determined the swing bridge over the canal was structurally unsound, as it had sunk 7-8 inches due to settlement and some pieces of timber had split, and closed it. As a result of the bridge closure, SPI Pharma began shipping by truck and three tank cars remained stranded at SPI Pharma. In 2017, DelDOT determined that repairs to the swing bridge would be too costly and that they would abandon the line from Lewes to Cool Spring Road. Originally the tank cars were to be transported across the swing bridge, but due to the instability of the bridge they decided to transport the tank cars by truck across the canal and reassemble them onto the tracks on the other side for them to be hauled by rail to Georgetown. The three tank cars were trucked out of SPI Pharma in November 2017. A train pulled the tank cars out of Lewes on December 15, 2017, ending train service to Lewes. The line was decommissioned in 2018 and the tracks east of the Allen Harim Poultry Plant in Harbeson were removed that year.

In 2017, Canonie Atlantic Company/Accomack-Northampton Transportation District Commission applied to abandon the 49.1 miles of rail line from Hallwood to Cape Charles. It ran its last train in May 2018 and on Oct 31, 2019 the STB approved its abandonment application and it was railbanked. In 2020, the Virginia Department of Transportation began studying transforming the railroad into a trail called the Eastern Shore Rail to Trail. In October 2021 the Accomack-Northampton Transportation District Commission voted to remove the tracks and that work was performed in 2022.

== Remnants ==
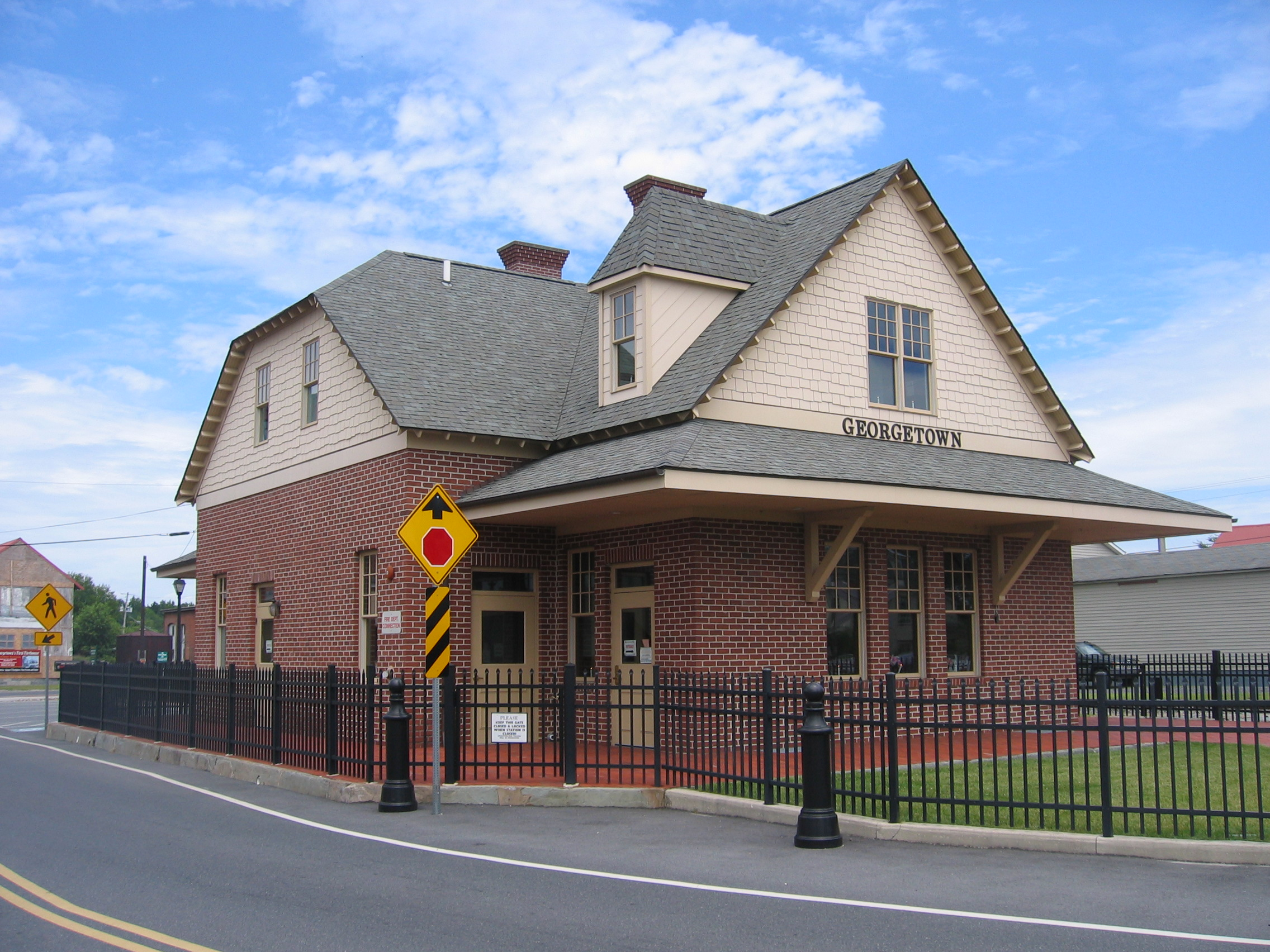
The restored Georgetown Train Station in Georgetown, Delaware

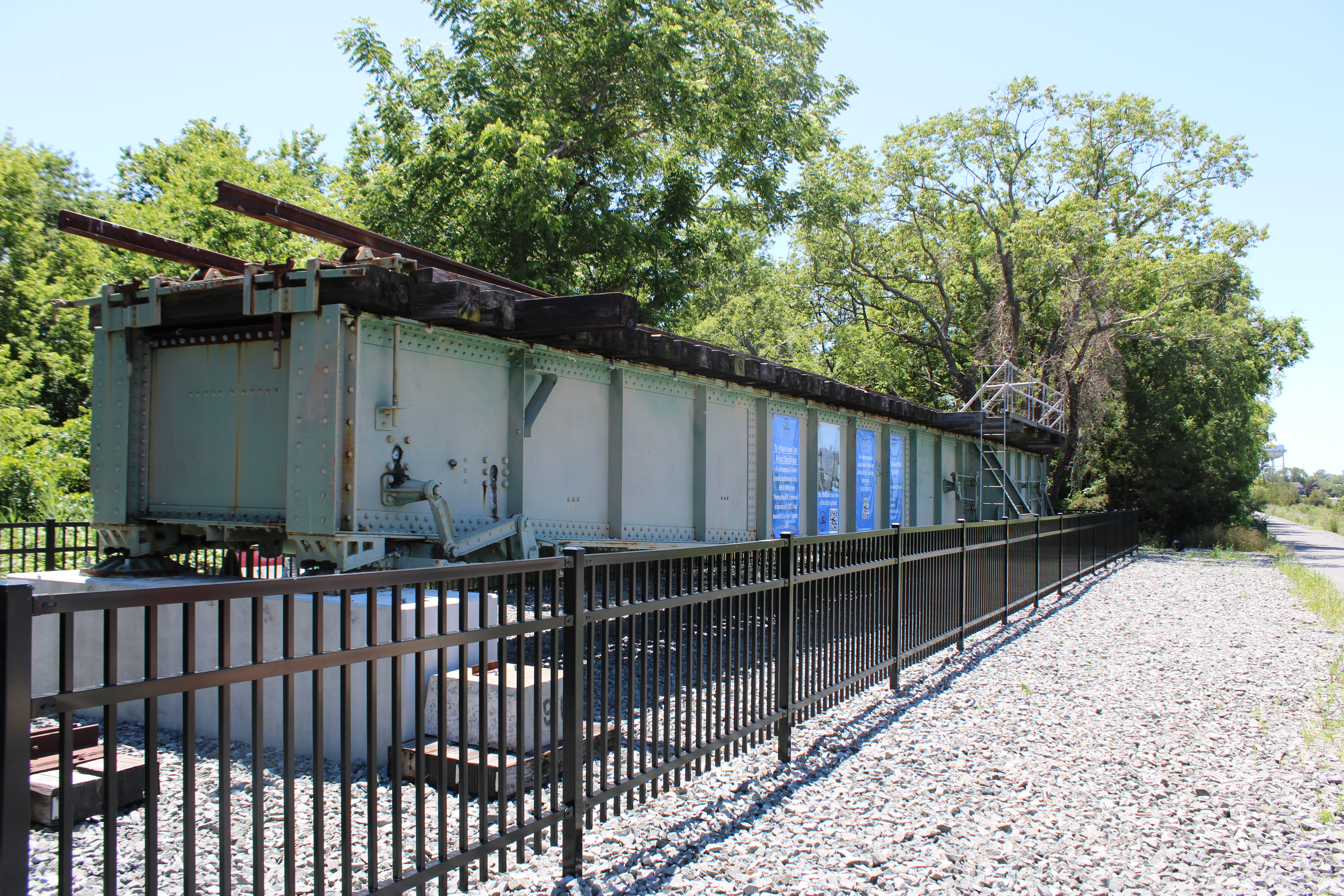
The preserved canal swing bridge along the trail

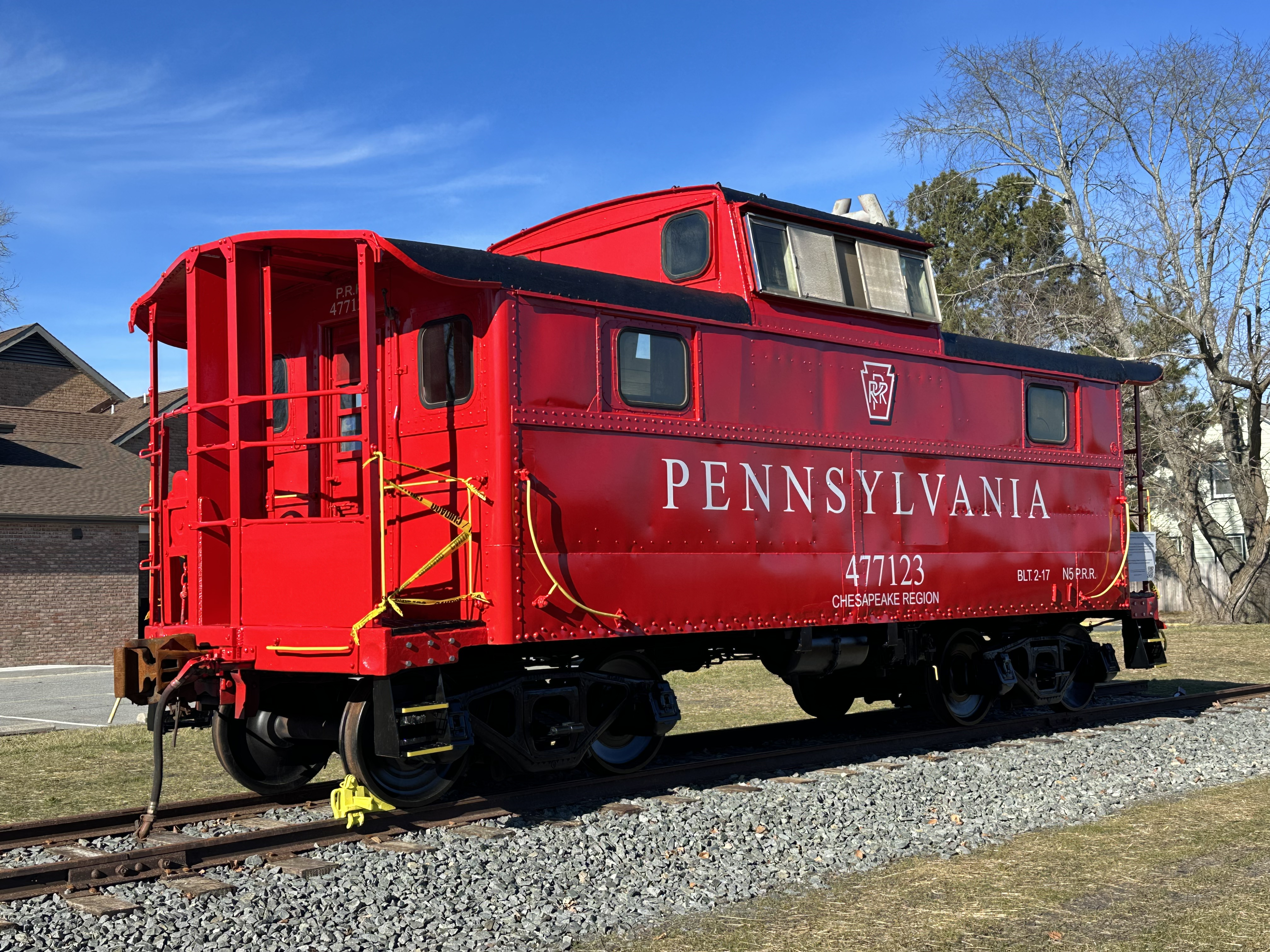
1917 Red Caboose at Lewes

=== Active Railroad ===
The Delmarva Subdivision, Indian River Subdivision, Indian River Industrial Track and Dagsboro Industrial Track (all owned by Norfolk Southern and operated by Delmarva Central Railroad); the Milton Industrial Track and the Lewes Running Track between Georgetown and Harbeson (both owned by DelDOT and operated by the Delmarva Central), and the Snow Hill Branch Line (owned and operated by MDDE) are still in operation.

=== Rail Trails ===
A 700-foot section of the rail right-of-way in Milton, DE was converted into the Milton Rail Trail in 2009 and extended west by 1600 feet, including a trestle over Ingram Branch, in June 2020.

The abandoned right-of-way from Fischer Road on the east side of Harbeson to just west of Cape Henlopen State Park in Lewes was converted into the Lewes-Georgetown Trail and there are plans to extend it west to the end of the track in Harbeson.

Some of the abandoned right-of-way from Lewes to Rehoboth Beach is used for the Junction and Breakwater Trail.

Most of the Crisfield Industrial Track that was abandoned in 1976 is in the process of being converted into a trail. 4.7 miles of the trail from Crisfield to Marion was opened in 2020 and dedicated in July 2021 as the Terrapin Run Trail (previously known as the "413 Rail to Trail"). Construction on the 2nd phase from Marion to Westover is planned for 2024.

The U.S. Fish and Wildlife Service, which oversees the Eastern Shore National Wildlife Refuge has converted most of the right-of-way between Cape Charles and Kiptopeke into the Southern Tip Bike & Hike Trail and plans to build more. The Nature Conservancy donated part of the easement and land for the trail and the Service constructed 5-miles of trail, in two phases, in 2011 and 2019. The trail extends from the Eastern Shore of Virginia National Wildlife Refuge north to Capeville Road in Capeville, Virginia. Future phases are planned to extend the trail all the way to Cape Charles and may or may not use the right-of-way. Along this right-of-way, several bridges and culverts from the railroad remain.

=== Stations ===
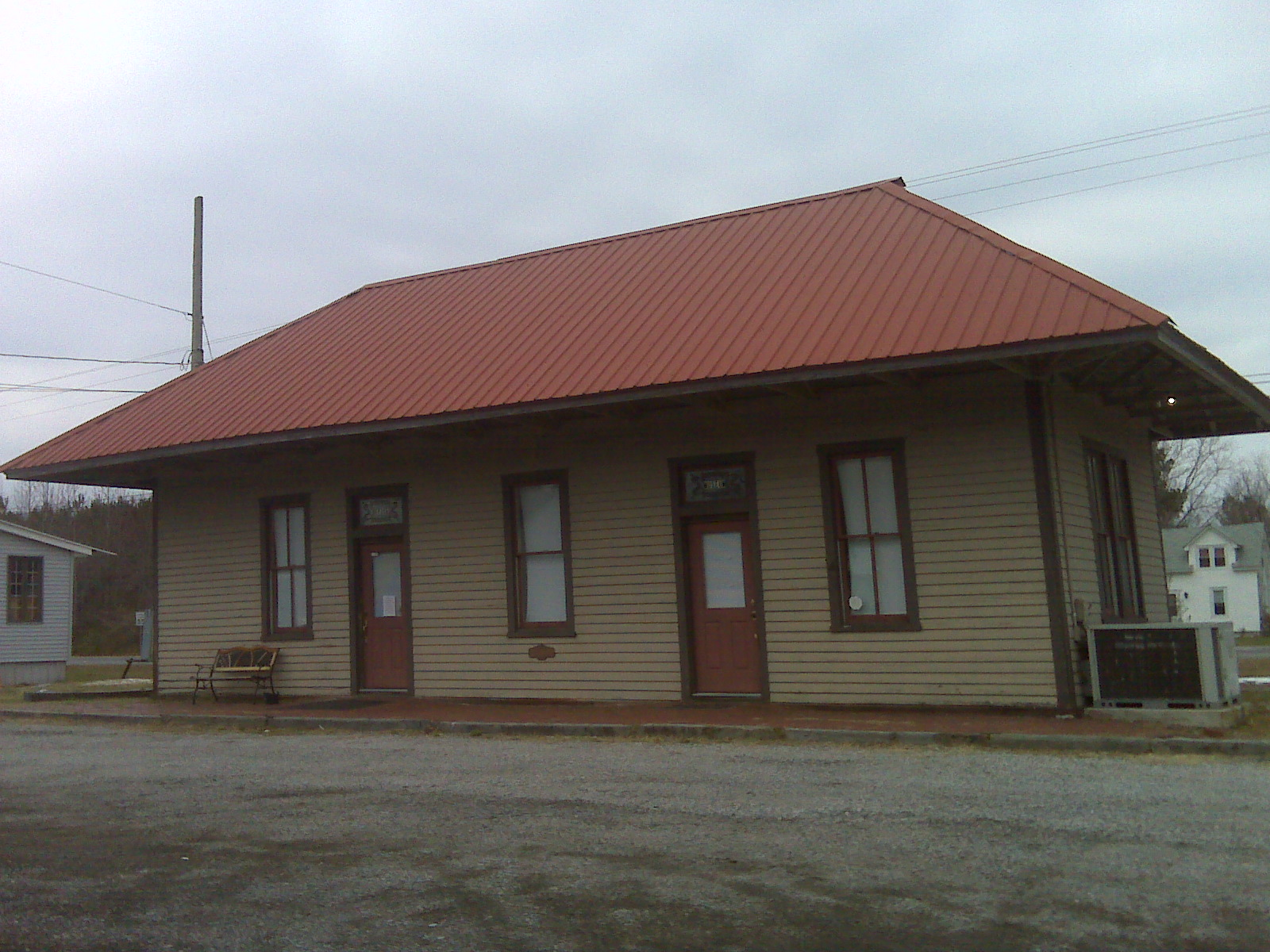
The restored Marion Train Station in Marion Station, Maryland

The historic Milford train station is still in use, but as office space.

The 1892 Georgetown Train Station closed when passenger service ended in 1949, but was restored in 2003 and now contains office space.

The Marion train station still stands in the town of Marion Station, Maryland. In 1997, a revitalization project began to restore the building. It was reopened in the early 2000s as the new Accohannock Indian Museum, containing various relics from the time when Marion Station was a bustling city.

The Felton Railroad Station was listed on the National Register of Historic Places in 1981 and was renovated for use as a museum. The Wyoming station was listed in 1980 and is also extent.

The Rehoboth Beach Train Station which was built in the late 1800s currently serves as Rehoboth Beach-Dewey Beach Chamber of Commerce and Visitors Center. It was in service until the 1920s. After that it served as offices, small shops and a restaurant until it was sold in 1950. It was donated to the city and the Rehoboth Railroad Station Preservation Society and moved to its present location at 501 Rehoboth Avenue in 1987.

From Georgetown to Snow Hill several old stations remain including the one at Queponco Road in Newark, DE, which is now a museum.

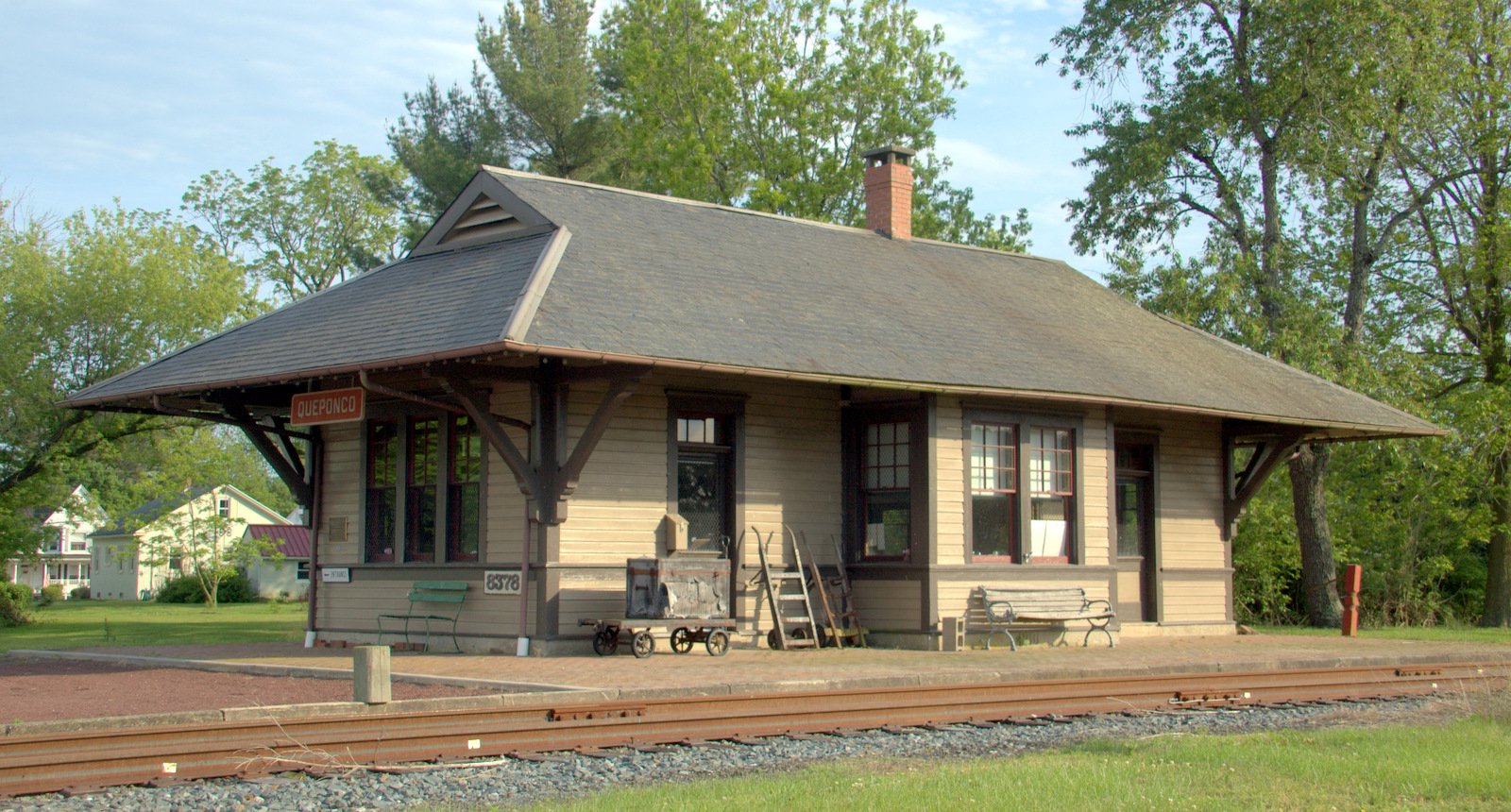
Queponco Railway Station in Newark, MD

The stations at Snow Hill and Girdletree, MD; the depot at Franklin City and a couple of vintage RR crossing signs in Girdletree where the line used to be are the only remnants of the section south of Snow Hill. In 2020, the Federal Government announced that it wanted the Franklin City Depot removed and began looking for people to take it.

=== Other remnants ===
On the west side of Milton another trestle, over Pemberton Branch, is also extent.

A Delaware state historical marker in Milton and another in Ellendale's historic Railroad Square district commemorate the railroad.

The Harbeson Railroad Station privy, built in 1870, was donated to the Lewes Historical Society and moved to their campus by 2022.

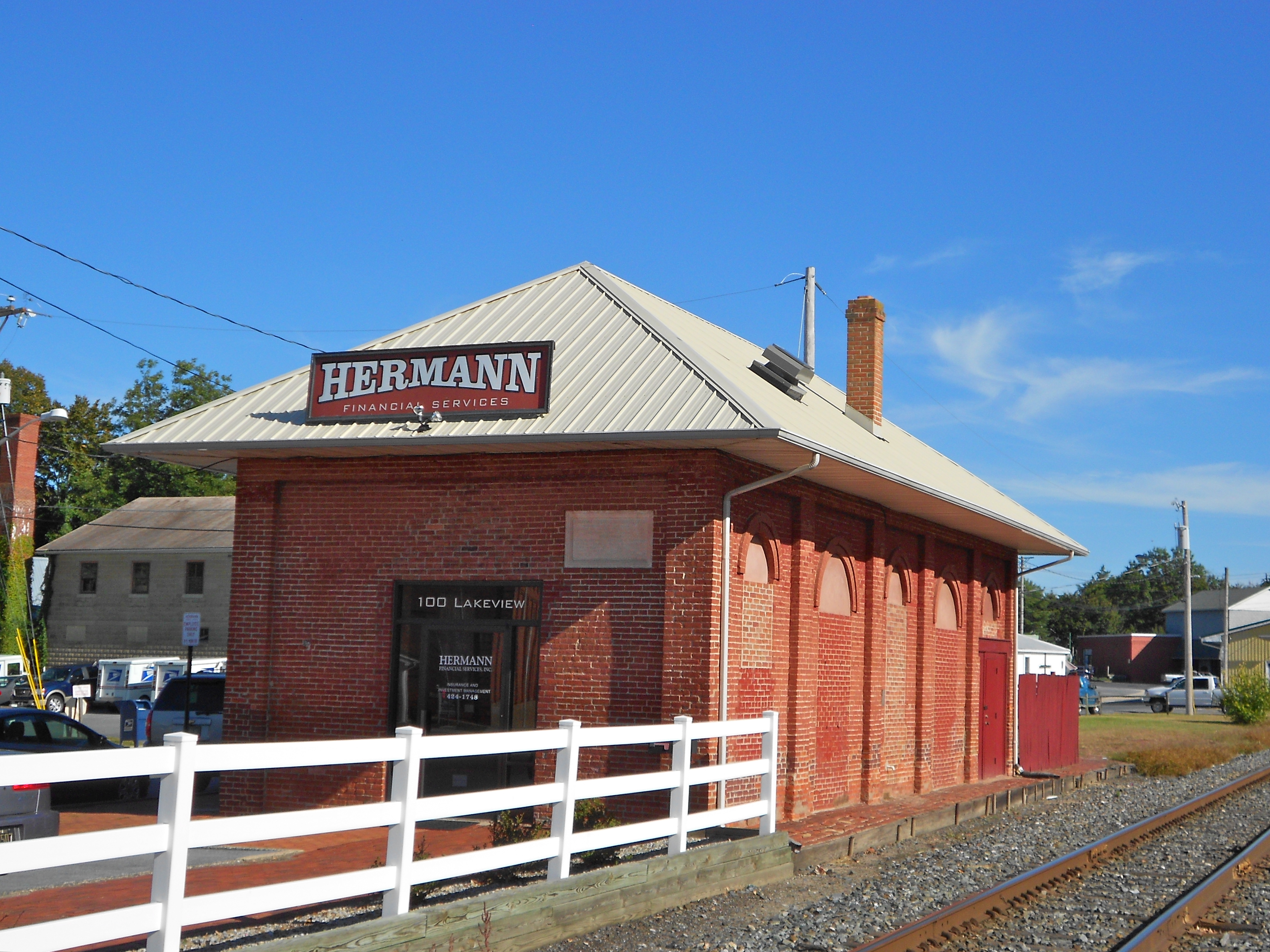
Milford Railroad Station listed on the NRHP on January 7, 1983.

In Lewes, the Lewes Junction Railroad & Bridge Association built a railroad history park, which includes a 1917 caboose, that had been used by the old Delaware Coast Line Railroad on its last run in 2017 and by the Queen Anne's dinner car in the 90's; a 210-foot portion of original track, and a replica of the old train station next to the Lewes Public Library.

The old Lewes-Rehoboth Canal bridge, and the date stone from the west abutment, are on permanent display along the Lewes-Georgetown Trail at American Legion Road in Lewes. The bridge was a hand-cranked swing bridge that was originally built in 1869 and modernized by PRR in 1916. The bridge was reconstructed in 1997. After DelDot decided it was unsafe in 2016, leading to the rail line east of the canal being shut down, it was removed on Feb. 15, 2022 and the canal was restored over the next year.
