= Smith Beach, Virginia =

Unincorporated community in Virginia, United States

Smith Beach
- Location within Virginia Location within the United States
- Coordinates: 37°21′45″N 75°59′25″W
- Country: United States
- State: Virginia
- County: Northampton
- Elevation: 20 ft (6.1 m)
- Time zone: UTC−05:00 (EST)
  - Summer (DST): UTC−04:00 (EDT)

Smith Beach is an unincorporated community in Northampton County, Virginia, United States. The elevation is 20 feet (6 m). Smith Beach appears on the Cheriton U.S. Geological Survey Map. Northampton County is in the Eastern Time Zone (UTC -5 hours).
