= Birdsnest, Virginia =

Unincorporated community in Virginia, United States

Birdsnest
- Unincorporated community
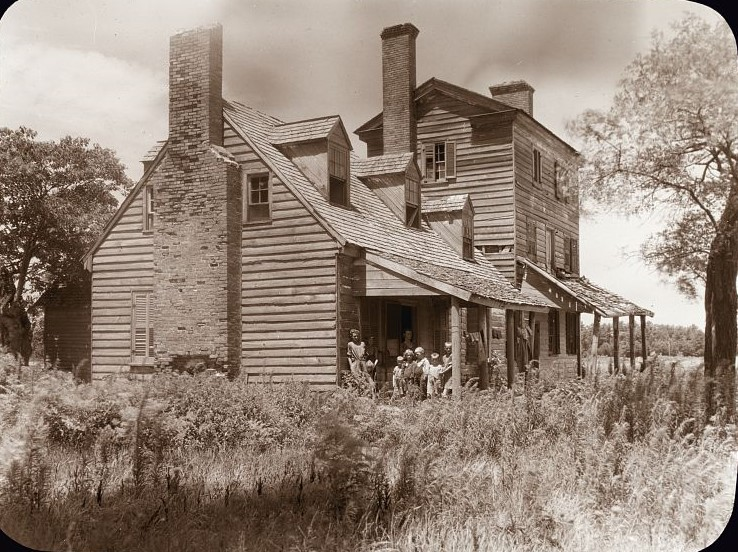
- Old Birdsnest's Tavern, by Frances Benjamin Johnston, ca. 1930s

- Location within the Commonwealth of Virginia Birdsnest (the United States)
- Coordinates: 37°26′20″N 75°52′52″W
- Country: United States
- State: Virginia
- County: Northampton
- Elevation: 36 ft (11 m)
- Time zone: UTC−5 (Eastern (EST))
  - Summer (DST): UTC−4 (EDT)
- ZIP codes: 23307
- GNIS feature ID: 1463454

Birdsnest is an unincorporated community in Northampton County, Virginia, United States. It was also known as Bridgetown Station. The local post office closed in October 2011.
