= Porter, Delaware =

Unincorporated community in Delaware, United States

- Unincorporated community
- Location within Delaware Location within the United States
- Coordinates: 39°36′01″N 75°41′24″W
- Country: United States
- State: Delaware
- County: New Castle
- Elevation: 59 ft (18 m)
- Time zone: UTC-5 (Eastern (EST))
  - Summer (DST): UTC-4 (EDT)
- Area code: 302
- GNIS feature ID: 216185

Porter is an unincorporated community in New Castle County, Delaware, United States. Porter is located at the intersection of Porter Road and Old Porter Road, southwest of Bear, and is the location of a junction between the Norfolk Southern Railway and the Delmarva Central Railroad.

== Education ==
Previously Porter was in the Newark School District.
