= Hallwood, Virginia =

- Town
- Location in Accomack County and the state of Virginia.
- Coordinates: 37°52′39″N 75°35′26″W
- Country: United States
- State: Virginia
- County: Accomack

Government
  - Mayor: J. Jackie Poulson, Jr.

Area
  - Total: 0.24 sq mi (0.61 km^{2})
  - Land: 0.24 sq mi (0.61 km^{2})
  - Water: 0 sq mi (0.00 km^{2})
- Elevation: 16 ft (4.9 m)

Population (2020)
  - Total: 202
  - Estimate (2019): 200
  - Density: 846.6/sq mi (326.87/km^{2})
- Time zone: UTC−5 (Eastern (EST))
  - Summer (DST): UTC−4 (EDT)
- ZIP code: 23359
- Area codes: 757, 948
- FIPS code: 51-34176
- GNIS feature ID: 1495643

Hallwood is a town in Accomack County, Virginia, United States. As of the 2020 census, Hallwood had a population of 202.

== History ==
Wessells Root Cellar was added to the National Register of Historic Places in 1970.

== Geography ==
Hallwood is located at 37°52′39″N 75°35′26″W (37.877418, −75.590589).

According to the United States Census Bureau, the town has a total area of 0.2 square mile (0.6 km^{2}), all land. It lies at an elevation of 16 feet.

== Demographics ==
Historical population
Census	Pop.	Note	%±
1960	269		—
1970	254		−5.6%
1980	243		−4.3%
1990	228		−6.2%
2000	290		27.2%
2010	206		−29.0%
2020	202		−1.9%
U.S. Decennial Census

At the 2000 census there were 290 people, 100 households, and 73 families living in the town. The population density was 1,184.8 people per square mile (466.5/km^{2}). There were 121 housing units at an average density of 494.3 per square mile (194.7/km^{2}). The racial makeup of the town was 84.14% White, 4.48% African American, 1.03% Native American, 8.97% from other races, and 1.38% from two or more races. Hispanic or Latino of any race were 12.76%.

Of the 100 households 37.0% had children under the age of 18 living with them, 56.0% were married couples living together, 12.0% had a female householder with no husband present, and 27.0% were non-families. 22.0% of households were one person and 15.0% were one person aged 65 or older. The average household size was 2.90 and the average family size was 3.38.

The age distribution was 33.4% under the age of 18, 5.9% from 18 to 24, 26.6% from 25 to 44, 21.7% from 45 to 64, and 12.4% 65 or older. The median age was 32 years. For every 100 females, there were 101.4 males. For every 100 females aged 18 and over, there were 101.0 males.

The median household income was $29,861 and the median family income was $30,000. Males had a median income of $20,625 versus $19,773 for females. The per capita income for the town was $13,351. About 8.8% of families and 14.5% of the population were below the poverty line, including 21.4% of those under the age of eighteen and 3.9% of those sixty-five or over.

== Climate ==
The climate in this area is characterized by hot, humid summers and generally mild to cool winters. According to the Köppen Climate Classification system, Hallwood has a humid subtropical climate, abbreviated "Cfa" on climate maps.

== Transportation ==
=== Public transportation ===
STAR Transit provides public transit services, linking Hallwood with Onley, Oak Hall, and other communities in Accomack and Northampton counties.

=== Railroads ===
After the Bay Coast Railroad went out of business in 2018 and its tracks subsequently removed in 2021, Hallwood is now the southern terminus of the Delmarva Central Railroad.

== Recreation ==
Hallwood will eventually serve as the northern trailhead of the Eastern Shore of Virginia Rail Trail, which will run 49.1 miles to the south to Cape Charles along the route of the abandoned Bay Coast Railroad.
