= Delmarva Central Railroad =

Class III short line railroad

Overview
- Headquarters: Harrington, Delaware
- Reporting mark: DCR
- Locale: Delmarva Peninsula
- Dates of operation: 2016–

Technical
- Track gauge: 4 ft 8 1/2 in (1,435 mm) standard gauge
- Length: 188 miles (303 km)

Other
- Website: Official website

The Delmarva Central Railroad (reporting mark DCR) is an American short-line railroad owned by Carload Express, Inc. that operates 188 miles (303 km) of track on the Delmarva Peninsula in the states of Delaware, Maryland, and Virginia. The railroad operates lines from Porter, Delaware to Hallwood, Virginia and from Harrington, Delaware to Frankford, Delaware along with several smaller branches. The DCR interchanges with the Norfolk Southern Railway and the Maryland and Delaware Railroad. The railroad was created in 2016 to take over the Norfolk Southern Railway lines on the Delmarva Peninsula. The DCR expanded by taking over part of the Bay Coast Railroad in 2018 and the Delaware Coast Line Railroad in 2019.

== Operations ==
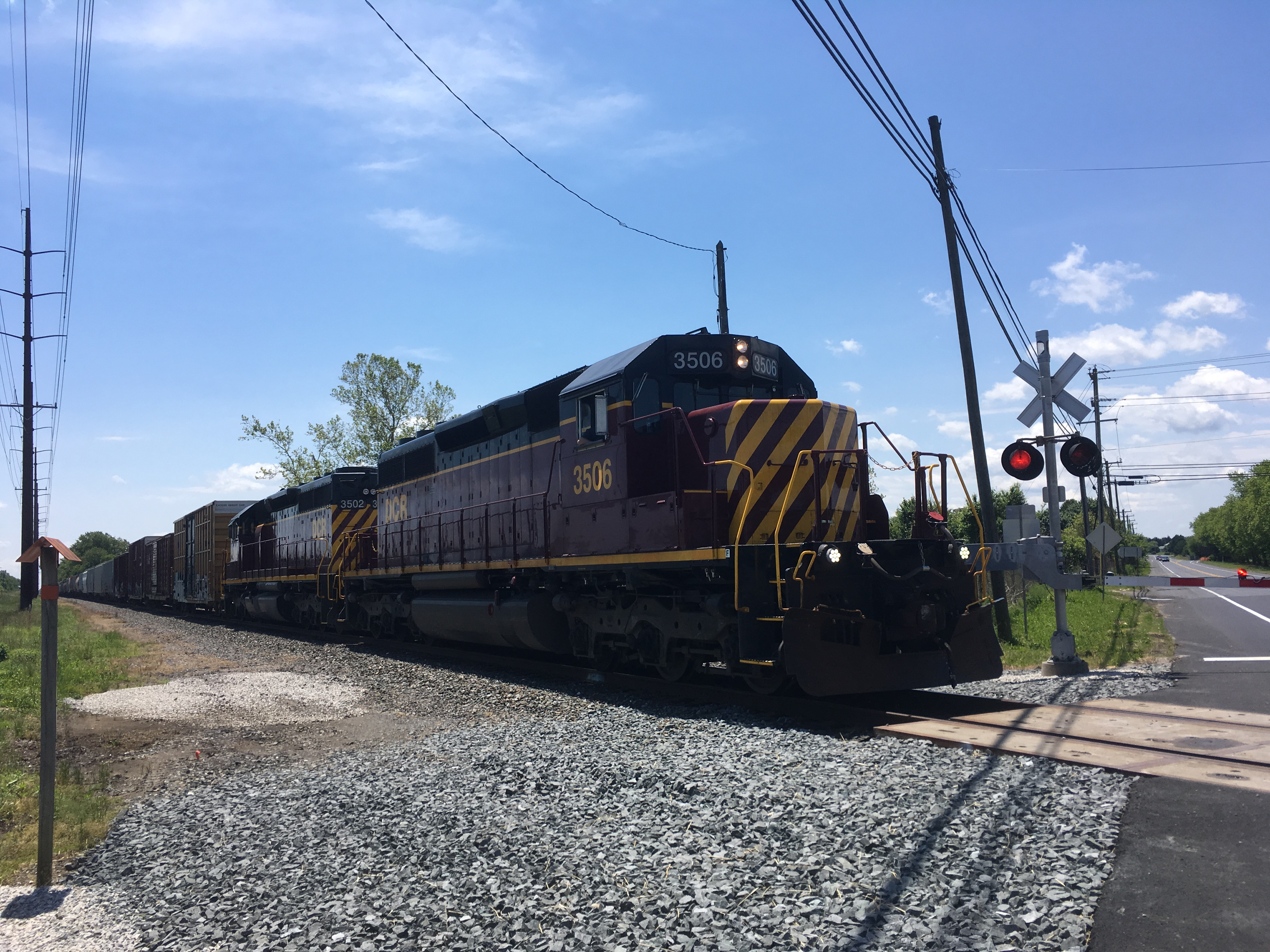
DCR SD40-2 3506 leads a train northbound in Clayton, Delaware

The DCR operates on 188 miles (303 km) of trackage on the Delmarva Peninsula in the states of Delaware, Maryland, and Virginia. The DCR's main line runs 113.79 miles (183.13 km) from Porter, Delaware south to Pocomoke City, Maryland on the Delmarva Subdivision, with the section leading into Pocomoke City called the Pocomoke Industrial Track. The main line trackage continues south 14.8 miles (23.8 km) from Pocomoke City to Hallwood, Virginia on the Delmarva Industrial Track. A branch line runs 39.0 miles (62.8 km) from a junction with the Delmarva Subdivision in Harrington, Delaware to Frankford, Delaware on the Indian River Subdivision to Dagsboro, Delaware and then on the Dagsboro Industrial Track to Snow Hill, Maryland. From the Indian River Subdivision, the Milton Industrial Track branches east from Ellendale, Delaware to Milton, Delaware and the Lewes Industrial Track branches east from Georgetown, Delaware to Cool Spring, Delaware. Smaller lines operated by the DCR include the 0.4-mile (0.64 km) Oxford Industrial Track in Clayton, Delaware, the 2.3-mile (3.7 km) Cambridge Industrial Track in Seaford, Delaware, the 3.65-mile (5.87 km) Willards Industrial Track in Salisbury, Maryland, the 0.65-mile (1.05 km) Mardela Industrial Track in Salisbury, the 0.6-mile (0.97 km) Mill Street Industrial Track in Salisbury, and the 1.2-mile (1.9 km) Crisfield Industrial Track in Kings Creek, Maryland. The DCR also has trackage rights on Norfolk Southern Railway tracks from Porter to Tasker near New Castle, Delaware.

The DCR interchanges with the Norfolk Southern Railway in Clayton for mixed freight and Tasker for unit trains. There are also interchanges with the Maryland and Delaware Railroad in Townsend, Seaford, and Frankford. Products carried by the railroad include grain, propane, building materials, and bulk products. The railroad occasionally operates unit coal trains to the Indian River Power Plant operated by NRG Energy near Millsboro, Delaware, running as needed. Other unit trains operated by the DCR include grain trains to Allen Harim Foods near Seaford and Mountaire Farms in Frankford and Princess Anne, Maryland, and aggregate stone trains to H&K Group's Dagsboro Stone Depot in Dagsboro. The Delmarva Central Railroad provides freight service to over 50 customers.

The Delmarva Central Railroad operates with 14 locomotives, consisting of EMD GP38-2, EMD MP15AC, and EMD SD40-2 models. The DCR had EMD GP11 locomotives on the line temporarily, until operations were well underway, and the October 2018 issue of Railpace magazine noted on page 9 that the last two GP11s on the DCR had departed. DCR 2005 and 2007 were interchanged to Norfolk Southern at Clayton on July 25, 2018, for movement back to the home rails of parent company Carload Express. The magazine added that the DCR now has "an adequate number" of MP15s and GP38s to handle local chores.

The railroad is a subsidiary of Carload Express, a shortline operator based in Oakmont, Pennsylvania that also owns the Allegheny Valley Railroad and the Southwest Pennsylvania Railroad. Local management of the DCR is based in Harrington while freight operations are based in Dover, Delaware, Harrington, Seaford, and Delmar, Delaware. The DCR consists of 30 employees.

== History ==
DCR MP15AC's 1564 and 1551 lead a local freight train southbound through Dover, Delaware

The mainline of the DCR between Porter and Delmar was originally part of the Delaware Railroad while the mainline south of there was part of the New York, Philadelphia and Norfolk Railroad. These lines were later acquired by the Pennsylvania Railroad and passed to the Penn Central Transportation Company in 1968, Conrail in 1976, and the Norfolk Southern Railway in 1999. On April 1, 2006, the Norfolk Southern Railway established the Delmarva Business Unit as a marketing and business unit to improve customer service and operating efficiency as well as attract customers on its trackage in Delaware and eastern Maryland. The Delmarva Business Unit consisted of 191 miles (307 km) of trackage running between Newark, Delaware and Edgemoor Yard in Wilmington, Wilmington, Pocomoke City, Harrington and Frankford. The business unit, which was headquartered in Wilmington, had its own local management team.

In October 2016, the Norfolk Southern Railway selected Carload Express to lease and operate its Delmarva Peninsula trackage between Porter and Pocomoke City and Harrington and Frankford in an effort to turn around the underperforming lines. The DCR filed its application to begin operations with the Surface Transportation Board (STB) the following month. As a result of the acquisition, Carload Express purchased 17 additional locomotives. The DCR began operations in December 2016. In December 2016, the Sheet Metal Workers' International Association union filed a protest with the STB over the transaction, claiming that it did not have the resources to safely operate, but the STB dismissed the case in March 2017.

In June 2018, the DCR took over operations from the Bay Coast Railroad on trackage owned by the Canonie Atlantic Corporation between Pocomoke City and Hallwood after the Bay Coast Railroad ceased operations on May 18, 2018. The DCR took over the portion of the Bay Coast Railroad between Pocomoke City and Hallwood in order to continue rail service to the remaining customers along the line. On January 1, 2019, the DCR took over operations from the Delaware Coast Line Railroad between Ellendale and Milton and Georgetown and Cool Spring, having won the bid to operate the lines under contract from the State of Delaware.

On March 18, 2020, DCR announced that they were awarded a federal grant of $18.8 million to refurbish three moveable bridges (the Chesapeake & Delaware Canal Lift Bridge near Middletown, Delaware, the Seaford moveable bridge in Seaford, Delaware, and the Cassatt moveable bridge in Pocomoke City, Maryland), upgrade over 100 miles (160 km) of track along their main line, and improve nine grade crossings in Delaware and Maryland.
