= Baynard House =

Baynard House may refer to:

in England

- Baynard House, London

in the United States

- Bannister Hall and Baynard House, Smyrna, Delaware, listed on the National Register of Historic Places (NRHP)
- Ephriam M. Baynard House, Auburndale, Florida, NRHP-listed
- Stoney-Baynard Plantation, Hilton Head Island, South Carolina, NRHP-listed

== See also ==
- Baynard Boulevard Historic District, Wilmington, Delaware, NRHP-listed
