= Eliza Howard Sims Burd =

American philanthropist (1793–1860)

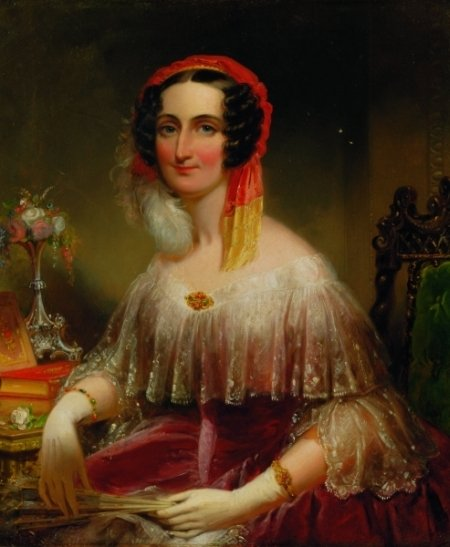
- Died: April 6, 1860

Eliza Howard Sims Burd (1793 – April 6, 1860) was an American philanthropist.

Eliza Howard Sims was born in 1793, the daughter of Wooddrop and Sarah Sims. In 1810, she married Edward Shippen Burd, a Philadelphia lawyer and businessman. The Burds were quite wealthy and lived in a mansion in Philadelphia on the corner of 9th and Chestnut Streets that was designed by Benjamin Latrobe. The Burds had eight children, but five died before the age of four and the other three died relatively young, all before 1846.

In 1843, she painted over a dozen watercolor views of a number of mineral springs in West Virginia which are now in several museum collections.

When her husband died in 1848, she commissioned an elaborate canopy tomb for him at St. Stephen's Episcopal Church. The monument was designed by Frank Wills and the figure of Bird sculpted by Henry Kirke Brown. She also commissioned a monument to three of her children in the church, created by Carl Steinhäuser.

Eliza Burd founded the Burd Orphan Asylum in Delaware County, Pennsylvania, administered by St. Stephen's. The Asylum housed and educated orphaned white girls, with the focus on the daughters of Episcopal clergy.
