= Clayton, Delaware =

- Town
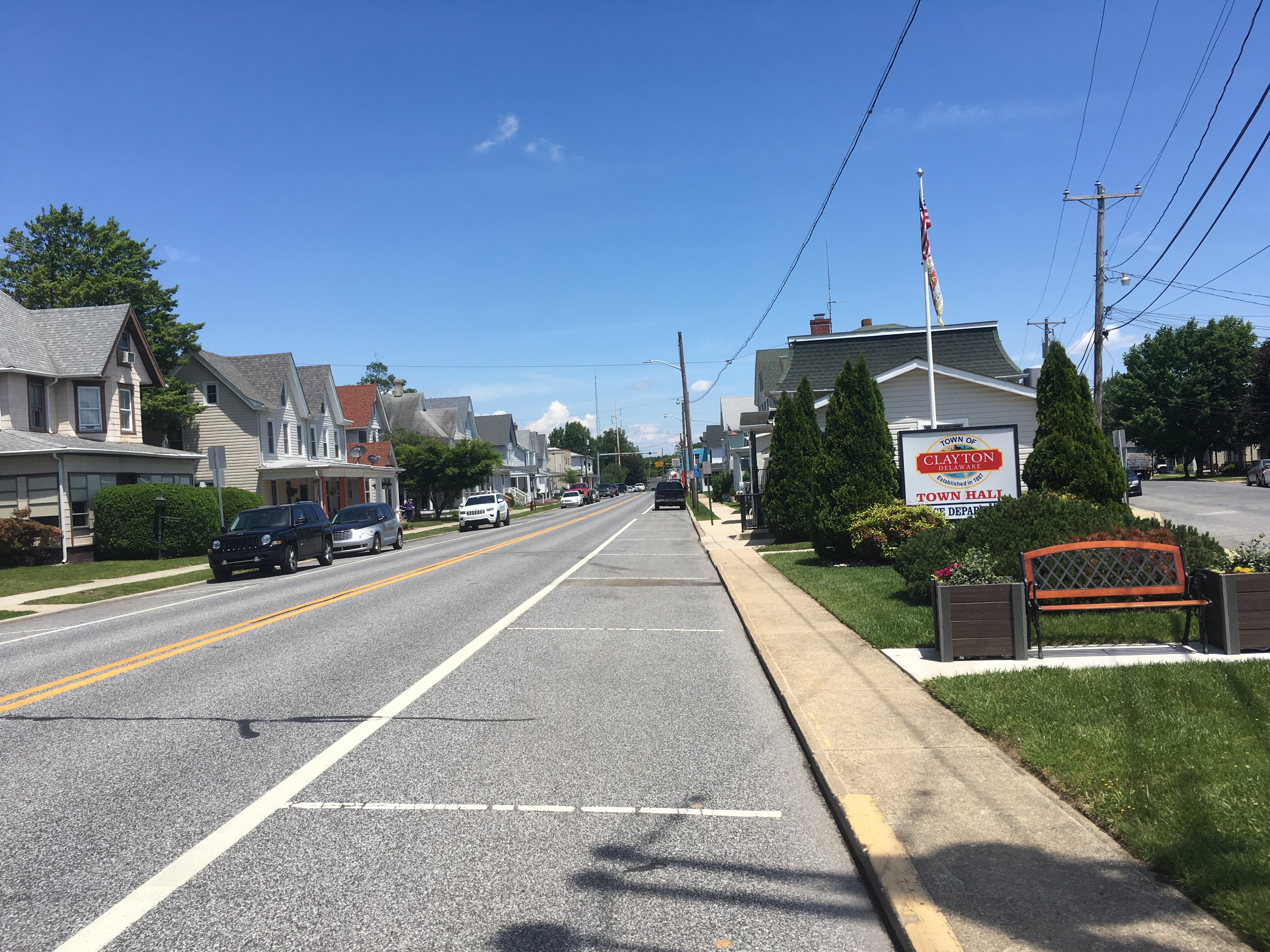
- Main Street in Clayton

- Seal
- Etymology: John Middleton Clayton
- Location of Clayton in Kent County, Delaware.

- Location within the state of Delaware Clayton (the United States)
- Coordinates: 39°17′26″N 75°38′04″W
- Country: United States
- State: Delaware
- Counties: Kent, New Castle
- Cargo Hub: 1765

Government
  - Type: Mayor-council
  - Mayor: Nick Smith

Area
  - Total: 1.95 sq mi (5.04 km^{2})
  - Land: 1.95 sq mi (5.04 km^{2})
  - Water: 0 sq mi (0.00 km^{2})
- Elevation: 46 ft (14 m)

Population (2020)
  - Total: 3,961
  - Density: 2,033.8/sq mi (785.26/km^{2})
- Time zone: UTC−5 (Eastern (EST))
  - Summer (DST): UTC−4 (EDT)
- ZIP code: 19938
- Area code: 302
- FIPS code: 10-15440
- GNIS feature ID: 213805
- Website: www.clayton.delaware.gov

Clayton is a town in Kent and New Castle counties in the U.S. state of Delaware. Located almost entirely in Kent County, it is part of the Dover metropolitan area. The population was 3,961 at the 2020 census.

== History ==
When the Delaware Railroad built its line south from Bear, Delaware, and through Kent County in 1855, there was a fight over where to run it in relation to Smyrna. Some wanted the rail line to run on the east side of town and others on the west. Farmers located about 1.5 miles to the west of Smyrna were able to entice the Delaware to build there and the stop became known as "Smyrna Station".

In 1861 the state at first planned to, but then later decided not to, change the name of Smyrna Station to Clayton in honor of John M. Clayton who was a supporter of the railroad. Despite the failure to change the name by law, people began to call it Clayton, Delaware.

In 1867, when the railroad connection between Smyrna Station and Smyrna was built, the state changed the name of the town to Smyrna Junction. The name never caught on, and the town's newspaper was named the Clayton Herald in the same year.

In 1874 the Kent County Rail Road built an extension of their line from Massey's Crossroads to Clayton, turning the town into both a north-south rail stop and an east-west one.

The town was incorporated as Clayton on April 15, 1887.

Byrd's AME Church, the Clayton Railroad Station, Enoch Jones House, and St. Joseph's Industrial School are listed on the National Register of Historic Places.

== Geography ==
Clayton is located at 39°17′26″N 75°38′04″W (39.2906671, –75.6343727).

According to the United States Census Bureau, the town has a total area of 1.0 square mile (2.6 km^{2}), all land. It was named after John Middleton Clayton, a prominent 19th-century Delaware lawyer and politician.

== Demographics ==
Historical population
Census	Pop.	Note	%±
1880	148		—
1890	540		264.9%
1900	819		51.7%
1910	764		−6.7%
1920	872		14.1%
1930	824		−5.5%
1940	890		8.0%
1950	825		−7.3%
1960	1,028		24.6%
1970	1,015		−1.3%
1980	1,216		19.8%
1990	1,163		−4.4%
2000	1,273		9.5%
2010	2,918		129.2%
2020	3,961		35.7%
U.S. Decennial Census

=== 2020 census ===
As of the 2020 census, Clayton had a population of 3,961. The median age was 34.6 years. 29.8% of residents were under the age of 18 and 9.9% of residents were 65 years of age or older. For every 100 females there were 95.1 males, and for every 100 females age 18 and over there were 90.0 males age 18 and over.

96.4% of residents lived in urban areas, while 3.6% lived in rural areas.

There were 1,308 households in Clayton, of which 50.4% had children under the age of 18 living in them. Of all households, 55.1% were married-couple households, 14.1% were households with a male householder and no spouse or partner present, and 22.8% were households with a female householder and no spouse or partner present. About 17.0% of all households were made up of individuals and 8.2% had someone living alone who was 65 years of age or older.

There were 1,356 housing units, of which 3.5% were vacant. The homeowner vacancy rate was 1.5% and the rental vacancy rate was 4.9%.

Racial composition as of the 2020 census
Race	Number	Percent
White	2,278	57.5%
Black or African American	1,211	30.6%
American Indian and Alaska Native	3	0.1%
Asian	45	1.1%
Native Hawaiian and Other Pacific Islander	3	0.1%
Some other race	100	2.5%
Two or more races	321	8.1%
Hispanic or Latino (of any race)	292	7.4%

=== 2000 census ===
As of the census of 2000, there were 1,273 people, 499 households, and 346 families living in the town. The population density was 1,242.3 inhabitants per square mile (479.7/km^{2}). There were 524 housing units at an average density of 511.4 units per square mile (197.5 units/km^{2}). The racial makeup of the town was 90.26% White, 8.09% African American, 0.31% Native American, 0.08% Asian, 0.08% Pacific Islander, 0.47% from other races, and 0.71% from two or more races. Hispanic or Latino of any race were 1.34% of the population.

There were 499 households, out of which 32.1% had children under the age of 18 living with them, 49.9% were married couples living together, 15.2% had a female householder with no husband present, and 30.5% were non-families. Of all households 25.7% were made up of individuals, and 11.4% had someone living alone who was 65 years of age or older. The average household size was 2.55 and the average family size was 3.05.

In the town, the population was spread out, with 27.2% under the age of 18, 7.3% from 18 to 24, 31.2% from 25 to 44, 20.3% from 45 to 64, and 14.0% who were 65 years of age or older. The median age was 36 years. For every 100 females, there were 89.2 males. For every 100 females age 18 and over, there were 81.1 males.

The median income for a household in the town was $43,462, and the median income for a family was $48,000. Males had a median income of $34,792 versus $25,862 for females. The per capita income for the town was $18,268. About 4.0% of families and 7.0% of the population were below the poverty line, including 5.6% of those under age 18 and 8.1% of those age 65 or over.

== Infrastructure ==
=== Transportation ===
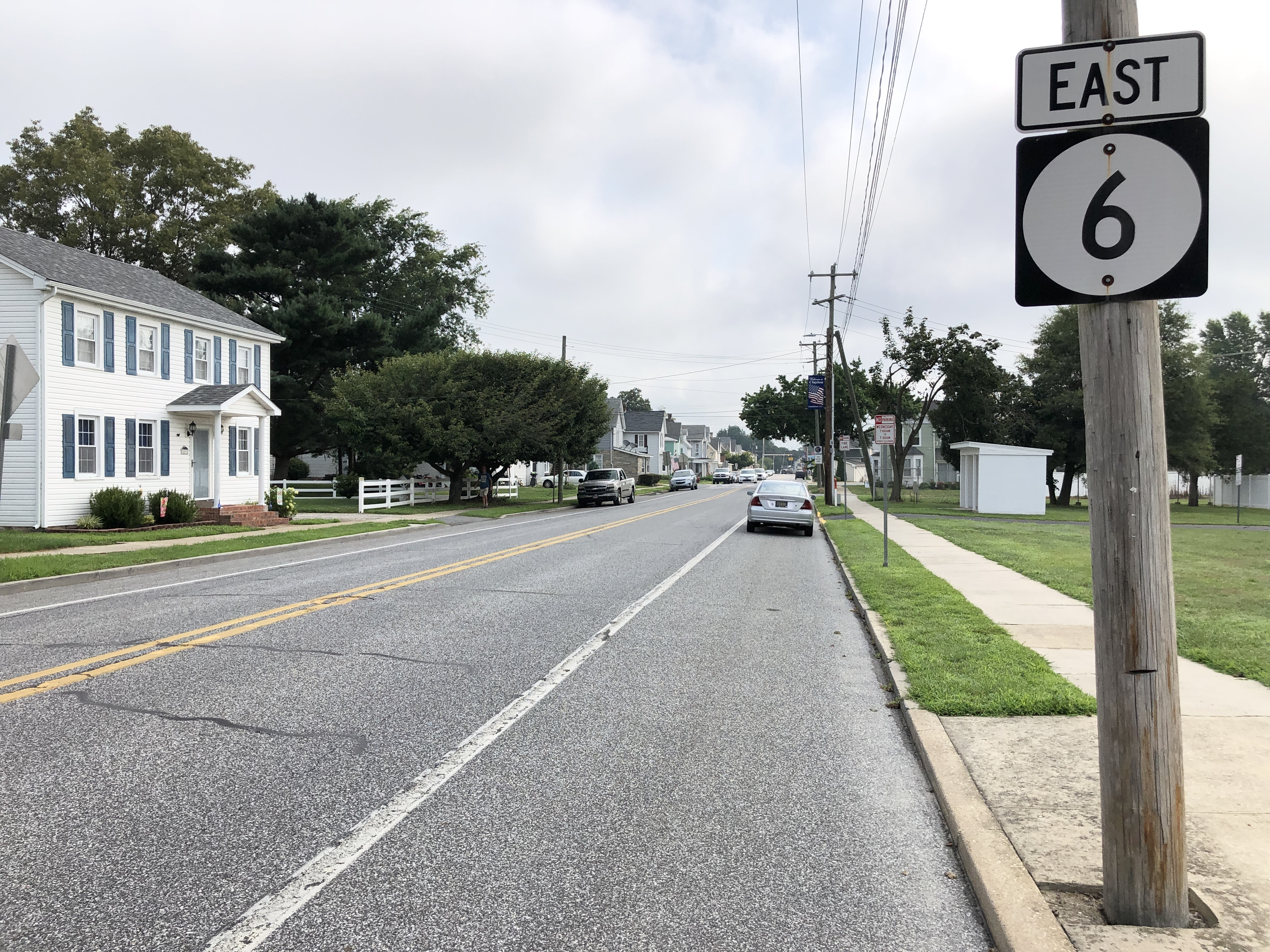
DE 6 eastbound in Clayton

Delaware Route 6 is the main east–west road in Clayton, passing through town on Main Street and heading west to Blackiston and east to Smyrna. In Smyrna, DE 6 intersects U.S. Route 13, which connects to the Delaware Route 1 toll road at two interchanges on each side of town. Delaware Route 300 passes through the southern part of Clayton on Wheatleys Pond Road, heading southwest to Kenton and northeast to Smyrna, where it joins DE 6 and follows that route to the US 13 intersection. Delaware Route 15 passes through the western part of Clayton, following DE 6 from the west before heading north on Duck Creek Road toward Middletown. The Delmarva Subdivision line of the Delmarva Central Railroad passes through Clayton, with the Delmarva Central Railroad having an interchange point with the Norfolk Southern Railway in the town.

=== Utilities ===
The Public Works department provides various utility services to Clayton. The public works department provides electricity to about 1,200 customers in Clayton. The town is a member of the Delaware Municipal Electric Corporation, a wholesale electric utility which provides electricity to municipal electric departments across Delaware. Artesian provides water service to 1,100 customers in the town, with four underwater wells and two elevated storage tanks. The public works department serves 1,100 sewer customers in Clayton, operating eight pumping stations and contracting with Kent County for wastewater treatment. The department contracts with Waste Industries for trash collection in Clayton. Natural gas service in Clayton is provided by Chesapeake Utilities, cable service is provided by Xfinity, and telephone service is provided by Verizon.

== Education ==
The school district is Smyrna School District. Its comprehensive high school is Smyrna High School.

Clayton School District merged into the Smyrna Special School District on April 22, 1952. The Smyrna Special district was reorganized, with the Kenton School District 9, into the Smyrna School District on July 1, 1969.
