= Clayton Herald =

American weekly newspaper (1867–1871)

- Independent in Everything; Neutral in Nothing
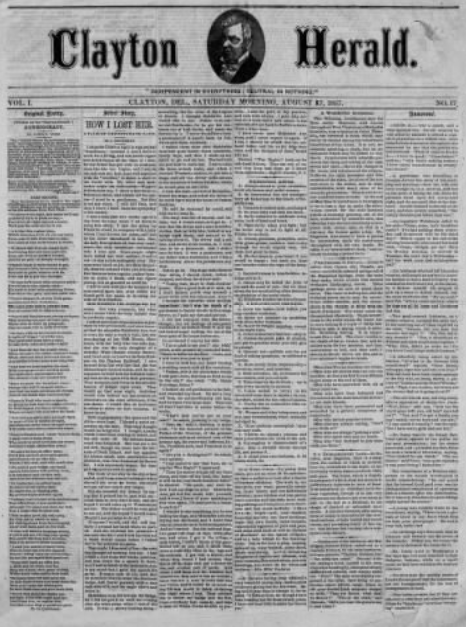
- Front page, August 17, 1867
- Type: Weekly newspaper
- Founder(s): Mrs. R. S. McConaughy
- Founded: 1867
- Political alignment: Republican
- Language: English
- Ceased publication: 1871
- City: Clayton, Delaware (1867–1870); Smyrna, Delaware (1870–1871)
- Country: United States

The Clayton Herald was an American weekly newspaper based in Clayton, Delaware, United States. It was founded by Mrs. R. S. McConaughy, believed to be the only woman to start a Delaware newspaper. She published it for three years until her death in December 1869, after which the paper was relocated to Smyrna and renamed the Herald and Intelligencer. It ceased publication in 1871. The paper's motto was "Independent in Everything; Neutral in Nothing."

== History ==
In 1867, the Clayton Herald was founded by Mrs. R. S. McConaughy, (Note: Listed in some sources as Mrs. R. H. McConaughy.) believed to be the only woman to start a Delaware newspaper. The paper was published each Saturday and included editorials written by McConaughy discussing local and national politics. The Herald also included original poetry, humorous notes and selected fiction, as well as a devotional section and a foreign news column. Other columns that appeared included one titled "Our Booktable" and one with farming instructions. A Republican-leaning paper, its motto was "Independent in Everything; Neutral in Nothing." The newspaper was an opposer of US president Andrew Johnson, with McConaughy writing in the August 17, 1867 publication "If Andy Johnson is still to have the control of affairs, God alone can tell what is in store for us. We tremble for the future of our country."

The paper had "a large circulation" in Delaware, Maryland, New Jersey, New York, and Pennsylvania, as well readers in the far south and west. Subscriptions cost $2 per year. Geo. P. Rowell and Co.'s 1869 American Newspaper Directory wrote that the Herald is the "best family paper published in Delaware."

The Clayton Herald was published by McConaughy for three years until her death in December 1869. Afterwards it was discontinued and its office was put up for sale. The paper was then purchased by James W. Spruance and B. F. Blackiston, who renamed it the Herald and Intelligencer and moved its headquarters to Smyrna. Spruance and Blackiston operated the newspaper until 1871, when it ceased publication.
