= Enoch Jones House =

Historic house in Delaware, United States

- U.S. National Register of Historic Places
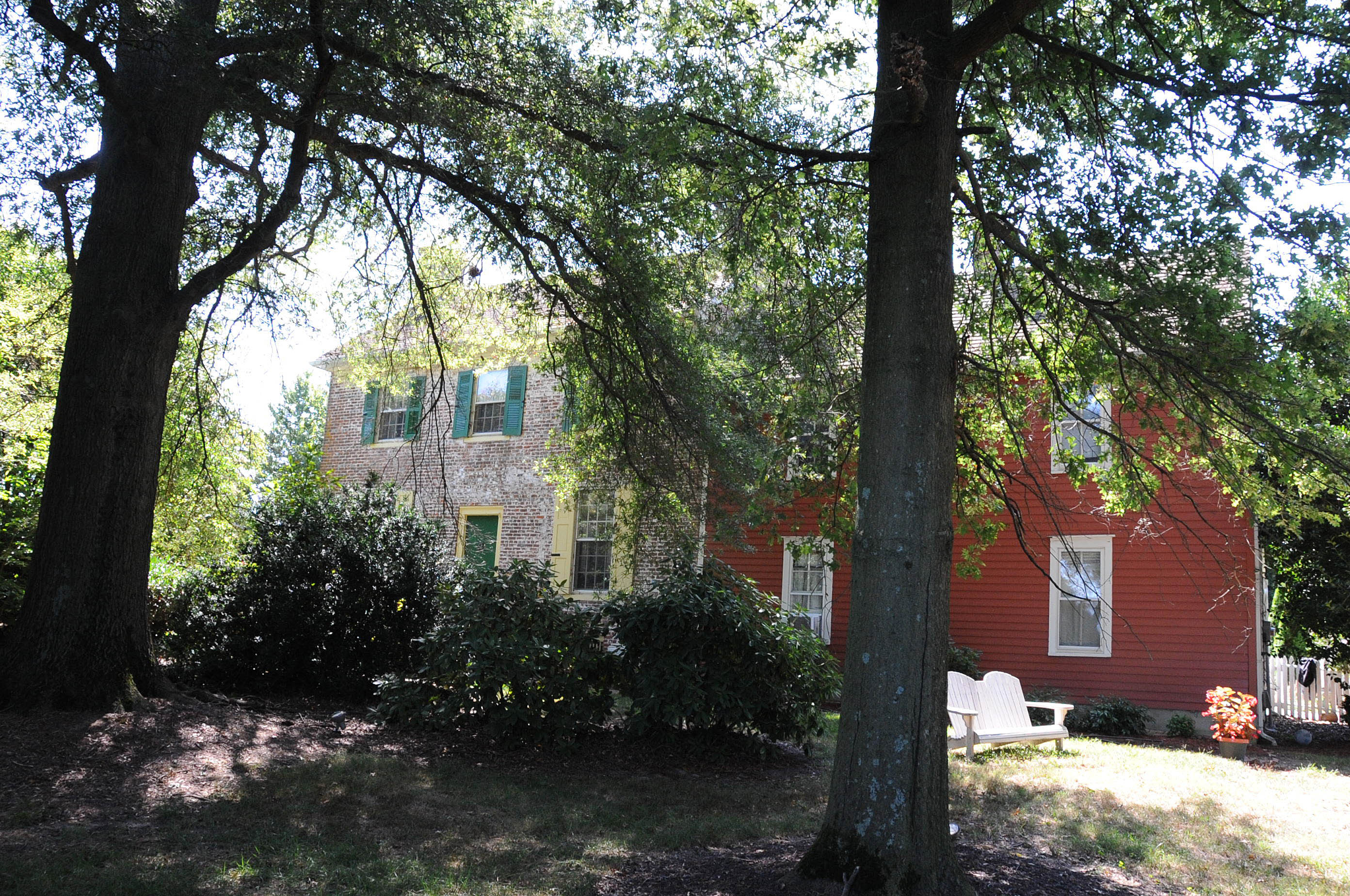

- Location within Delaware Location within the United States
- Location: Southwest of Clayton off Delaware Route 300, near Clayton, Delaware
- Coordinates: 39°16′45″N 75°39′37″W
- Area: 5 acres (2.0 ha)
- Built: 1792
- NRHP reference No.: 73000486
- Added to NRHP: June 19, 1973

Enoch Jones House, also known as "Boxwood," is a historic home located near Clayton, Kent County, Delaware. It dates to the mid-18th century, and consists of a two-story, three-bay, brick main house with a lower two-story frame west wing. The house is in the hall-and-parlor plan. It has a gable roof on both sections. The first documented reference to the house is a 1792 survey of Enoch Jones 717-acre estate.

It was added to the National Register of Historic Places in 1973.
