= Byrd's AME Church =

Historic church in Delaware, United States

- U.S. National Register of Historic Places
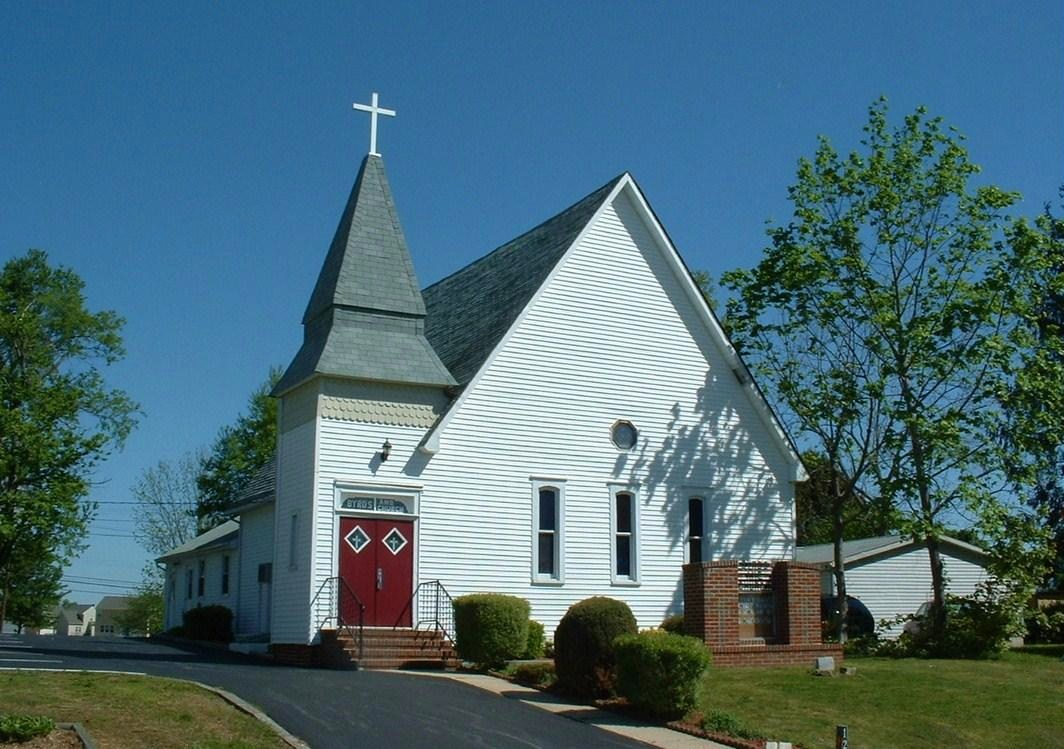

- Location within Delaware
- Location: Smyrna Ave., Clayton, Delaware
- Coordinates: 39°17′32″N 75°37′38″W
- Area: less than one acre
- Built: 1894
- Architectural style: Queen Anne
- NRHP reference No.: 82001023
- Added to NRHP: October 19, 1982

Byrd's African Methodist Episcopal Church is a historic African Methodist Episcopal (AME) church on Smyrna Avenue in Clayton, Kent County, Delaware.

== History ==
According to the U.S. Department of Interior, National Register of Historic Places, Byrd's African Methodist Episcopal Church was built on the outskirts of Clayton, Delaware in 1894. The church was named after the Rev. E. Byrd, who served as the pastor of Byrd's and Mt. Friendship.

Prior to building and the establishment of Byrd's A.M.E. Church during the early 1890s, the Smyrna-Clayton area of Delaware boasted two A.M.E. churches. They were Bethel Church on the eastern outskirts of Smyrna, and Mt. Friendship Church in the countryside west of Clayton.

Mt. Friendship was called the “Home Church” by Clayton members because prior Byrd's inception, all members of the black community, mostly railroad workers, walked several miles from Clayton to Mt. Friendship before the church's construction. This group of men, women and their families walked out to Kenton Road to Mt. Friendship, rather than through Smyrna to the older and larger Bethel Church. Within a decade after the raising of Mt. Friendship in 1886, the Clayton area residents began building Byrd's Church.

Byrd's A.M.E. Church is a small Queen Anne style structure located at the eastern edge of Clayton, Delaware on a quiet street, Smyrna Avenue; its environment is the Smyrna-Clayton Road and the railroad tracks to the north, open fields to the south, and open, early residential development on either side. The church faces south on a slightly elevated parcel of land. It retains its earthen yard, trees, and considerable space on the deep lot behind its kitchen wing. The original main block is cornerstone-dated 1894.
