= David J. Cummins House =

Historic house in Delaware, United States

- U.S. National Register of Historic Places
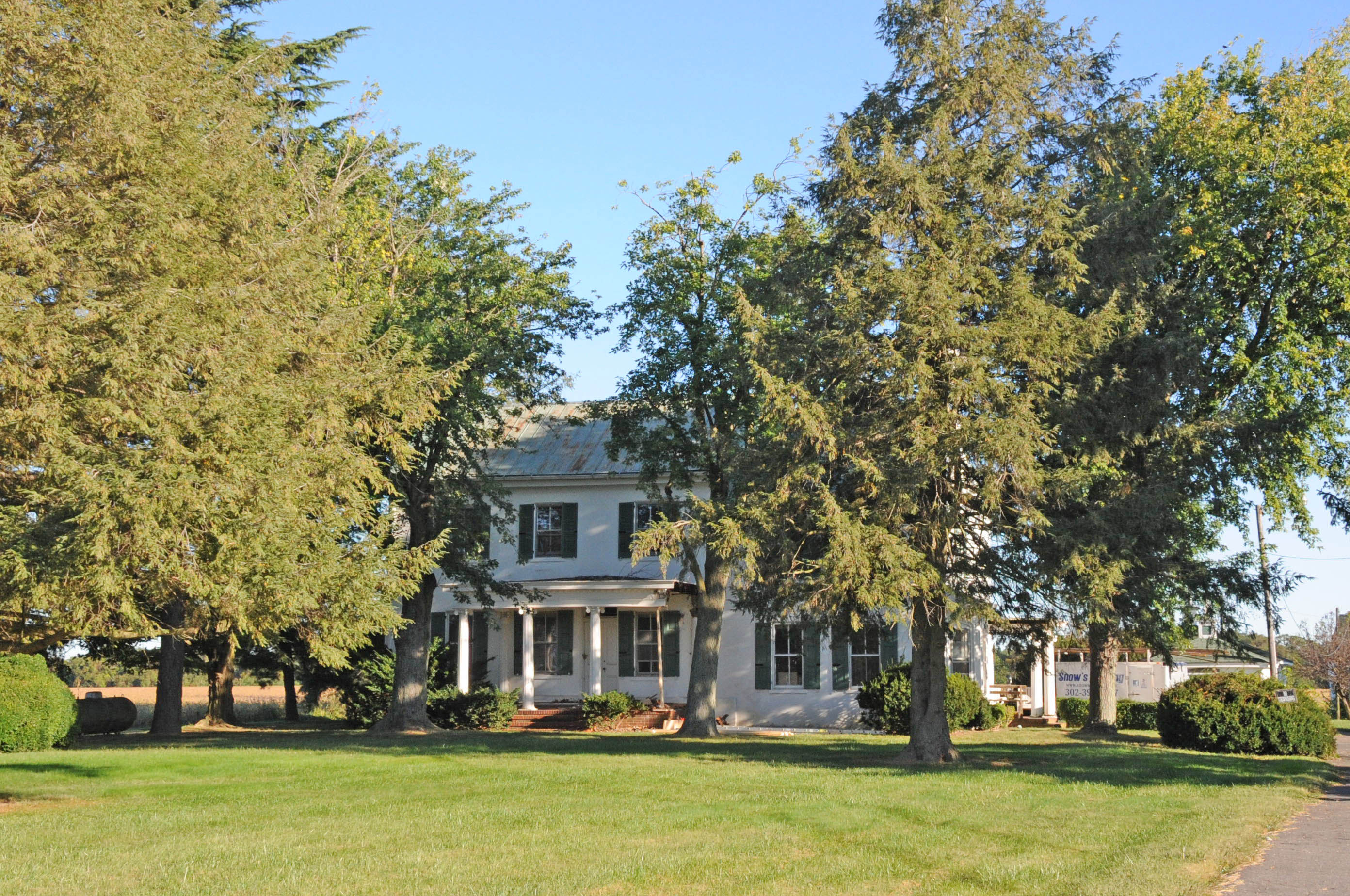

- Location within Delaware Location within the United States
- Location: 587 Smyrna-Leipsic Road, near Smyrna, Delaware
- Coordinates: 39.293745°N 75.587835°W
- Area: 77.5 acres (31.4 ha)
- Built: c. 1750
- Architectural style: Colonial Revival
- NRHP reference No.: 83003504
- Added to NRHP: October 6, 1983

David J. Cummins House, also known as "Glen Fern," is a historic home located near Smyrna, Kent County, Delaware. It built in the mid-18th century, and expanded and altered in the 19th century in a Victorianized Colonial Revival style. It was originally constructed as a two-story, four-bay, hall-and-parlor plan dwelling. The house consists of a main section with wings and is constructed of stuccoed brick.

It was listed on the National Register of Historic Places in 1983.
