= Timothy Cummins House =

Historic house in Delaware, United States

- U.S. National Register of Historic Places
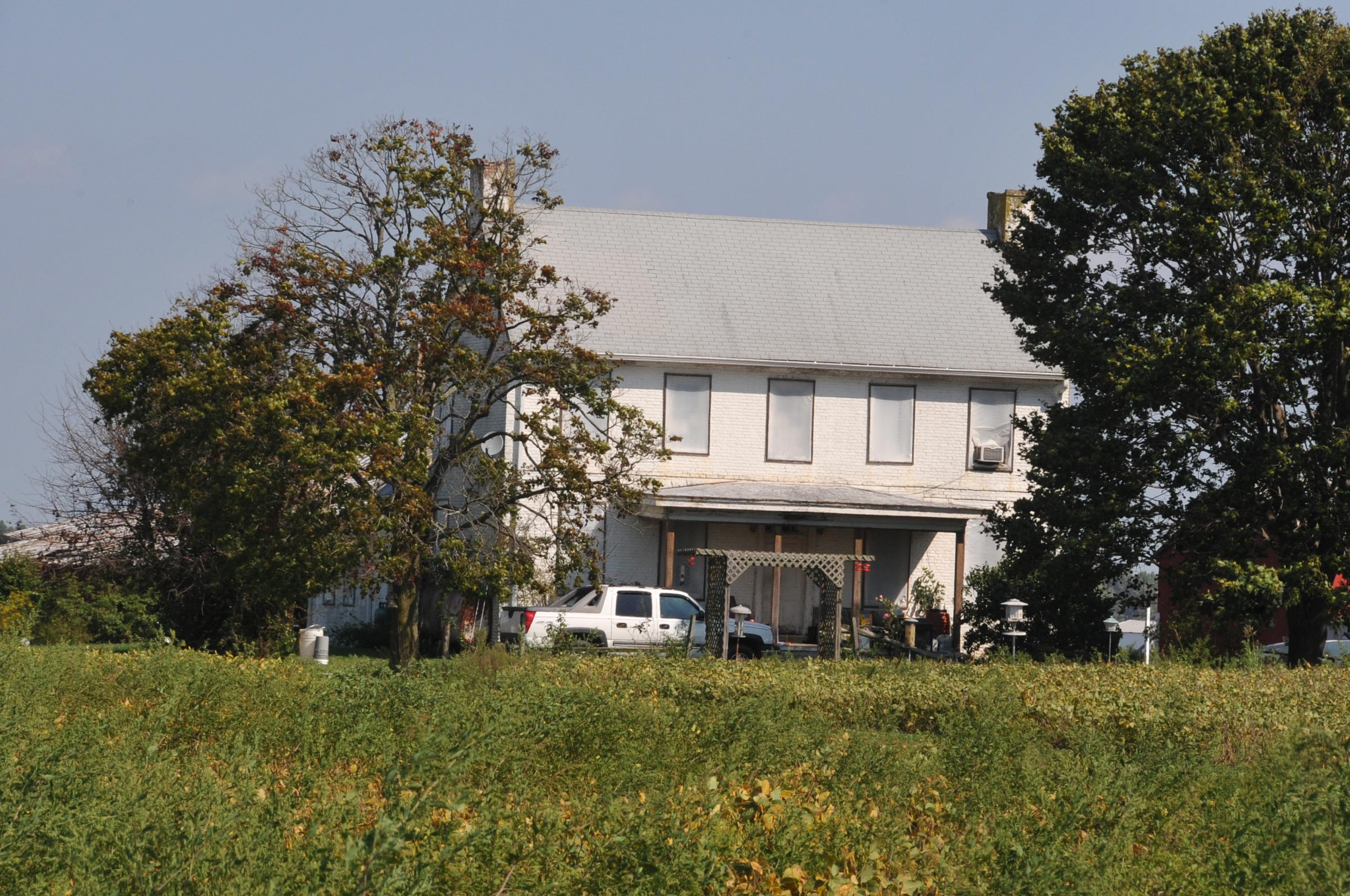

- Location within Delaware Location within the United States
- Location: 3411 Smyrna-Leipsic Road, near Smyrna, Delaware
- Coordinates: 39.279134°N 75.540205°W
- Area: 2.9 acres (1.2 ha)
- Built: c. 1780
- Architectural style: Georgian
- NRHP reference No.: 83003505
- Added to NRHP: October 6, 1983

Timothy Cummins House is a historic home located near Smyrna, Kent County, Delaware. It built about 1780, and is a two-story, five-bay center hall plan brick dwelling in the Georgian style. It has a small 1 1/2-story kitchen wing. A Greek Revival-style porch was added in the second quarter of the 19th century.

It was listed on the National Register of Historic Places in 1983.
