= Peterson and Mustard's Hermitage Farm =

Historic house in Delaware, United States

- U.S. National Register of Historic Places
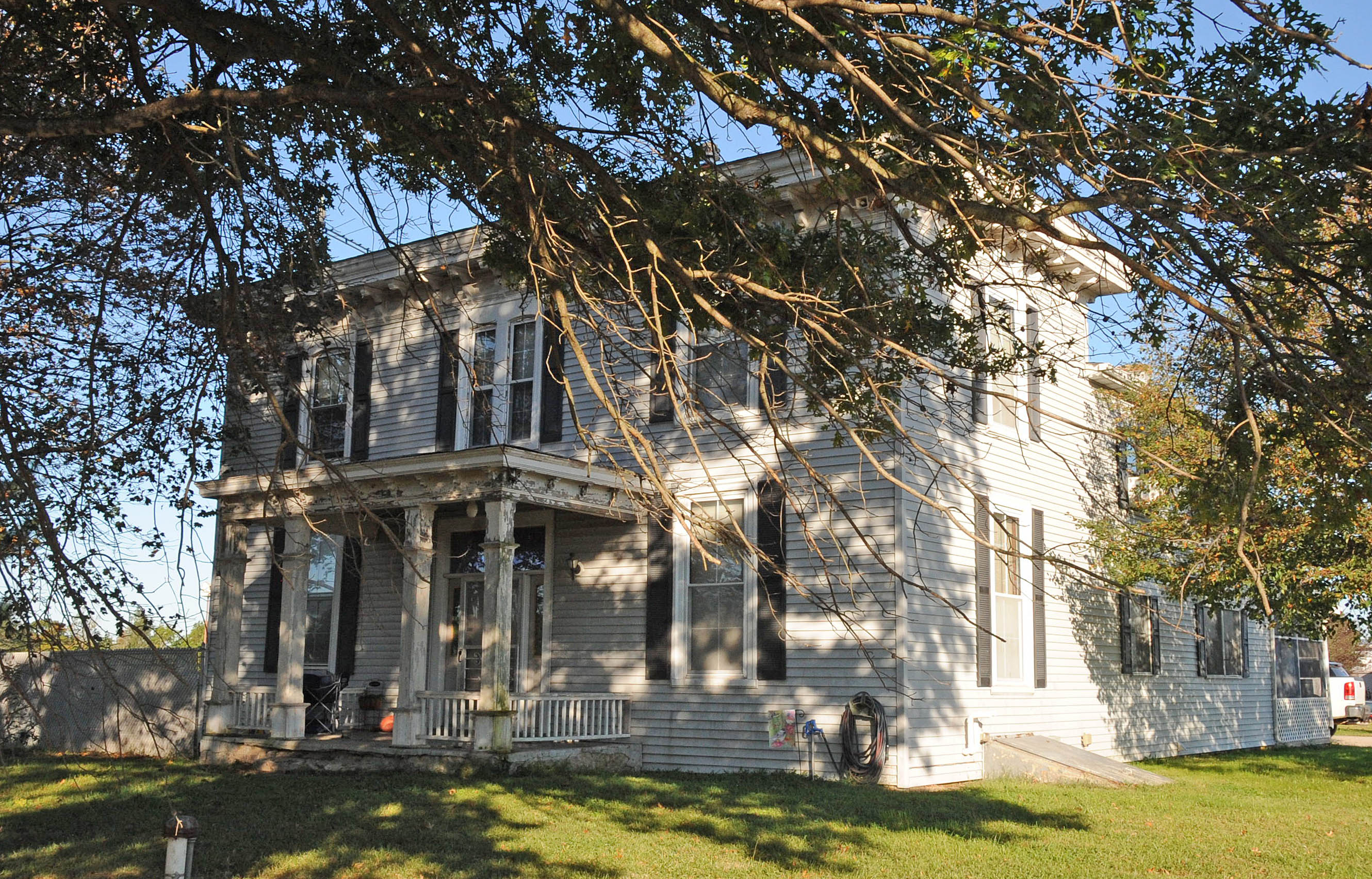

- Location within Delaware Location within the United States
- Location: 1653 Big Oak Road, near Smyrna, Delaware
- Coordinates: 39.291282°N 75.569403°W
- Area: 220 acres (89 ha)
- Built: c. 1863
- Architectural style: Greek Revival, Other, Italianate, peach house type
- NRHP reference No.: 82001027
- Added to NRHP: October 26, 1982

Peterson and Mustard's Hermitage Farm is a historic home located near Smyrna, Kent County, Delaware. It built about 1863, and is a two-story, L-shaped frame dwelling in the Italianate "peach house" style. It consists of a three-bay, flat-roofed main block with a rear service wing. The front facade features a Greek Revival-style entryway. Also on the property are a contributing granary-loading shed group and stable; both of pegged braced-frame construction, and probably dating from the 19th century.

It was listed on the National Register of Historic Places in 1982.
