= Woodlawn (Smyrna, Delaware) =

Former historic house in Delaware, US

- U.S. National Register of Historic Places
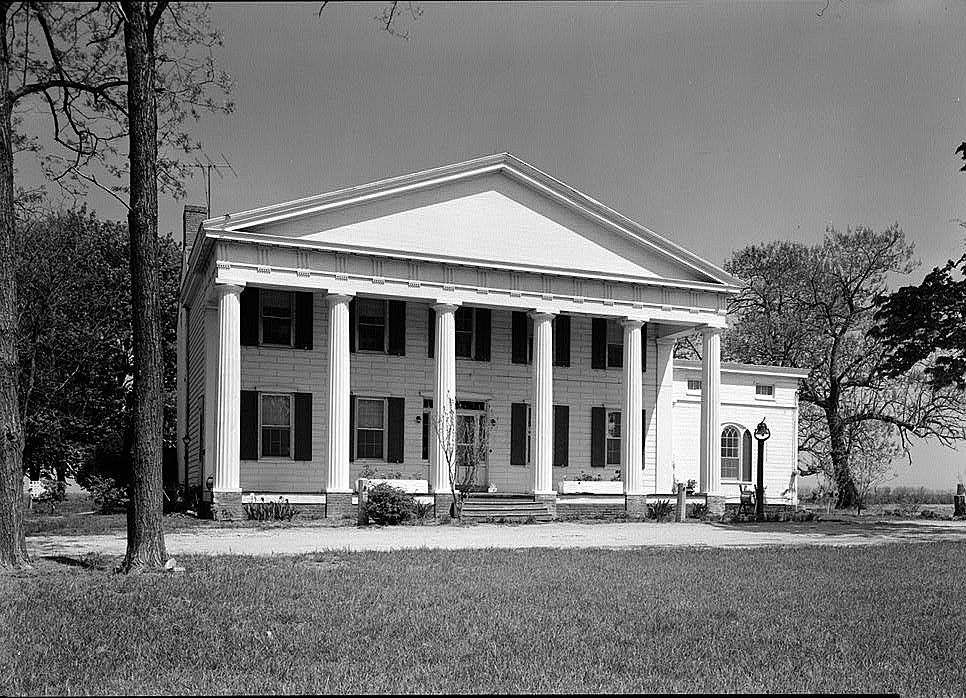
- Woodlawn in 1960

- Location within Delaware Location within the United States
- Location: 1165 DuPont Boulevard, near Smyrna, Delaware
- Coordinates: 39.287570°N 75.594175°W
- Area: less than one acre
- Built: 1853
- Architectural style: Greek Revival
- NRHP reference No.: 82001863
- Added to NRHP: October 19, 1982

Woodlawn, also known as the Thomas England House, was a historic home located near Smyrna, Delaware, United States. It was first known as Morris Rambles when built in 1741 by James Morris of Philadelphia, Pennsylvania. In 1853, it was sold by Elizabeth Berry Morris (the granddaughter of James Morris) to cousin George Wilson Cummins. After extensive renovations, the mansion was renamed Woodlawn. It was a two-story, five-bay temple-fronted frame dwelling in the Greek Revival-style. It had a gable roof and featured a monumental pedimented portico supported by six Doric order columns. It had a one-story kitchen wing with a low hipped roof.

It was listed on the National Register of Historic Places in 1982. The house was demolished on July 14, 2017, despite community efforts to preserve it.
