= Frances Van Gasken =

American physician

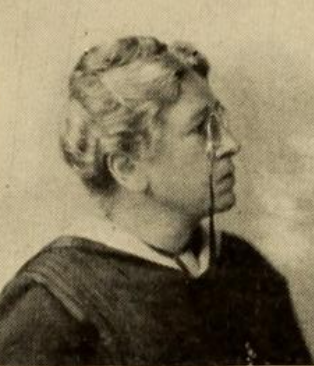
- Frances Van Gasken, from a 1921 yearbook
- Born: Frances Culbreth Van Gasken; May 24, 1860; Smyrna, Delaware, U.S.
- Died: October 24, 1939 (age 79); Drexel Hill, Pennsylvania, U.S.
- Occupations: Physician; educator; suffragist

Frances Culbreth Van Gasken (May 24, 1860 – October 24, 1939) was an American physician and suffragist, based in Philadelphia.

== Early life and education ==
Van Gasken was born in Smyrna, Delaware, the daughter of John Van Gasken and Harriet Van Gasken. Her mother died in 1863, and she was raised by her stepmother, Rachel English Van Gasken. She graduated from the Woman's Medical College of Pennsylvania in 1890. She later made postgraduate studies in Vienna. Her brother Joseph practiced medicine in Texas.

== Career ==
Van Gasken was one of the first women interns at Philadelphia General Hospital. In 1893 she was an inspector for the city's Bureau of Health, and addressed the Civic Club of Philadelphia on health conditions in the city's tenement houses. She was resident physician at the College Settlement House in Philadelphia until 1896, when she became physician for the women's department of the Philadelphia Municipal Court. She was removed as medical inspector by the mayor in 1899, sparking a protest from her colleagues. She was a professor of clinical medicine at the Woman's Hospital of Philadelphia from 1918 until she resigned as part of a faculty protest over Alice Weld Tallant's dismissal in 1923.

Van Gasken was known to wear a "Votes for Women" pin while teaching, and in January 1915 she was part of a delegation of Pennsylvania suffragists who spoke on the subject at the White House with Woodrow Wilson. She exhorted women medical students in 1917 to take on professional responsibilities and join in the war effort, saying "Who is there to fill these places but women? Is it not your day? Does opportunity not call to you?"

== Personal life and legacy ==
Van Gasken died in Drexel Hill, Pennsylvania, in 1939, at the age of 79. She left money to her sister and Camp Onawa in Piscataquis County, Maine, to her nephew; her estate also funded a scholarship in her father's name, at a high school in her hometown.
