= Savin-Wilson House =

Historic house in Delaware, United States

- U.S. National Register of Historic Places
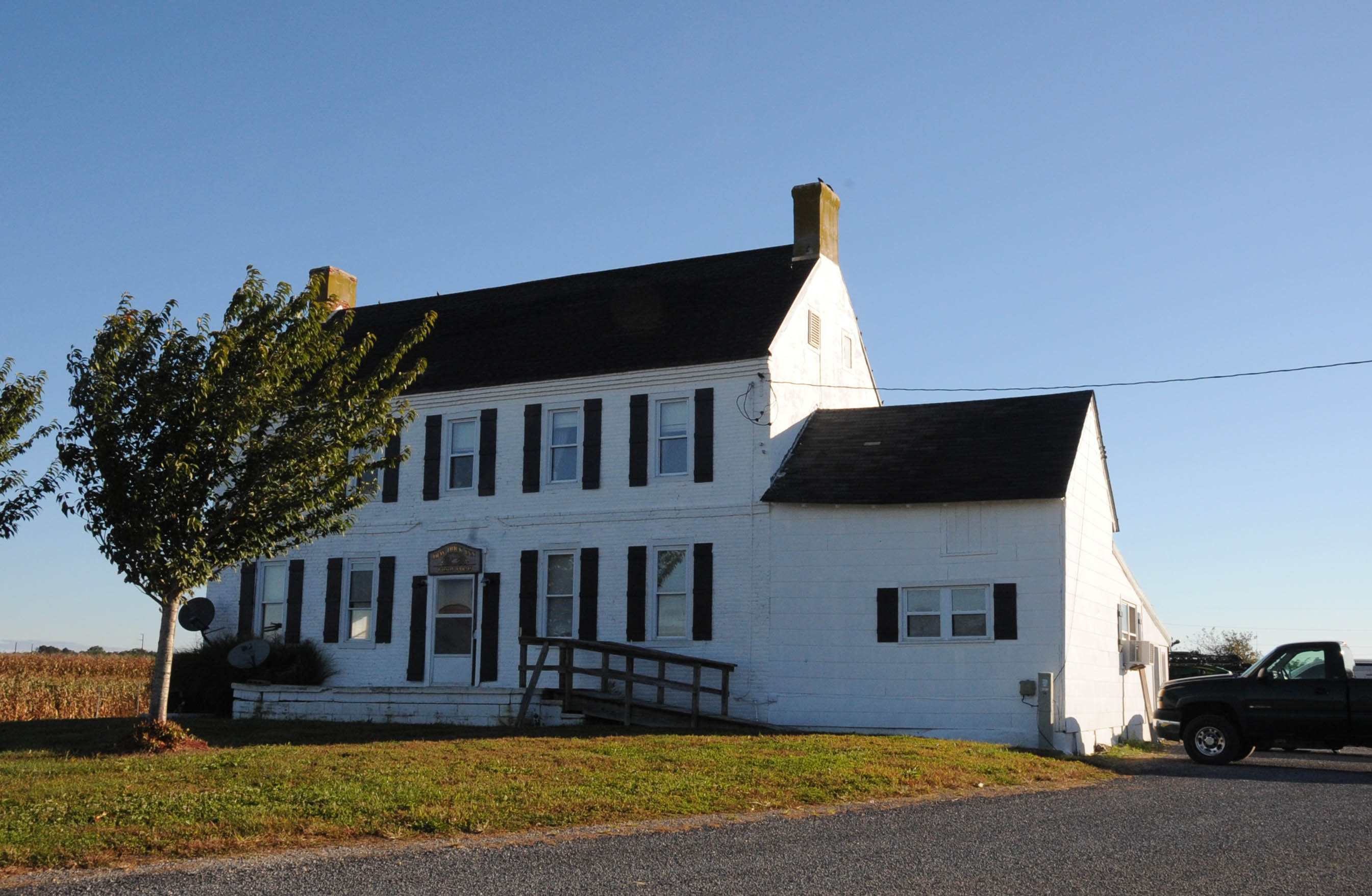

- Location within Delaware Location within the United States
- Location: 551 Hurd Road, in Duck Creek Hundred, near Smyrna, Delaware
- Coordinates: 39.286474°N 75.535345°W
- Area: 8 acres (3.2 ha)
- Built: 1820
- Architectural style: Georgian / Federal
- MPS: Dwellings of the Rural Elite in Central Delaware MPS
- NRHP reference No.: 92001135
- Added to NRHP: September 11, 1992

Savin-Wilson House, also known as the Dew Duck Inn Hunting Club and John B. Savin House, is a historic home located near Smyrna, Kent County, Delaware. It built about 1820, and consists of a two-story, five-bay, gable-roofed brick main block with a one-story, gable-roofed frame kitchen wing. It is in a late Georgian / Federal vernacular style.

It was listed on the National Register of Historic Places in 1992.
