= George Farmhouse =

Historic house in Delaware, United States

- U.S. National Register of Historic Places
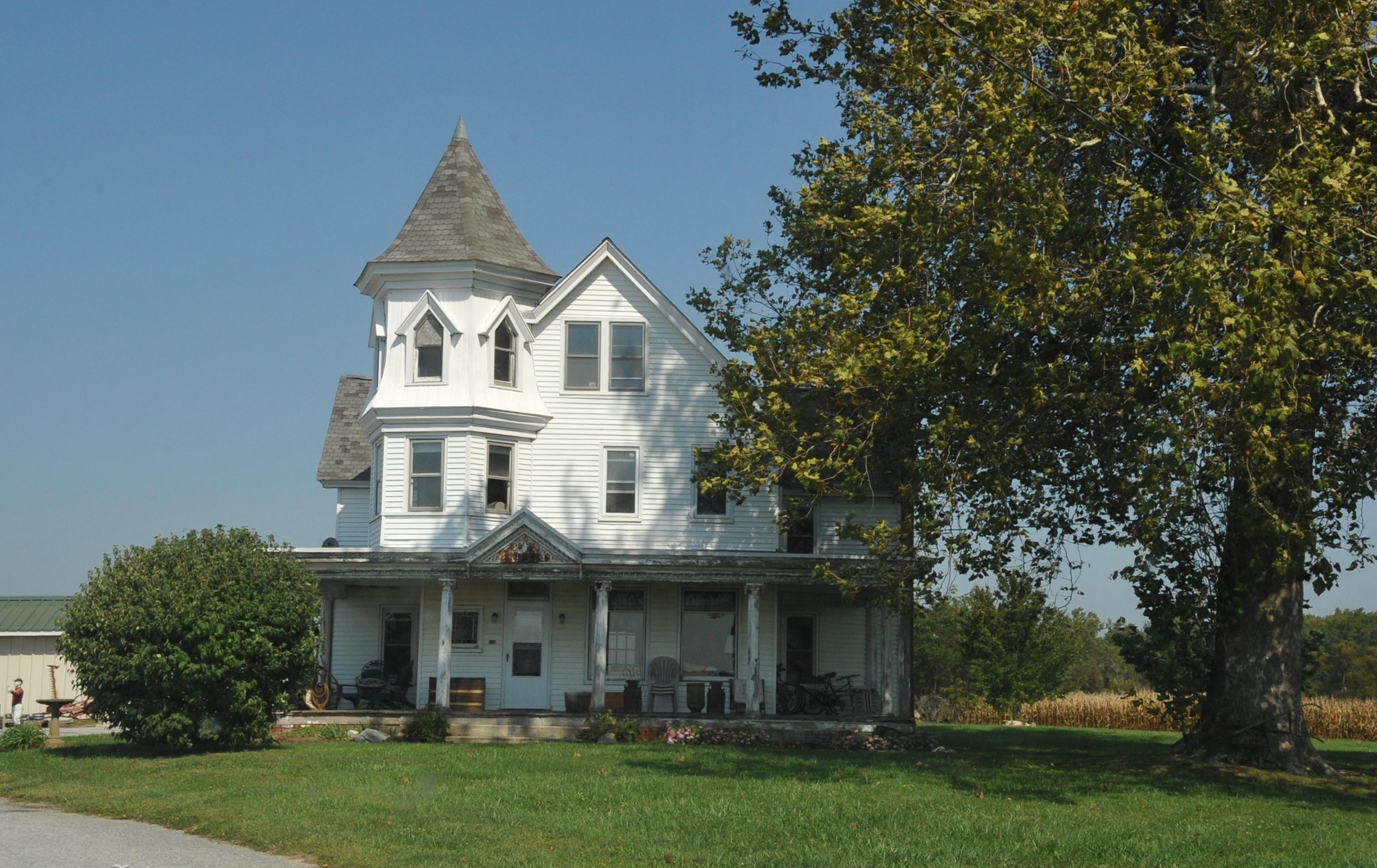
- George Farmhouse, September 2012

- Location within Delaware Location within the United States
- Location: 2615 Woodland Beach Road, near Smyrna, Delaware
- Coordinates: 39.311337°N 75.549174°W
- Area: less than one acre
- Built: c. 1915-1920
- Architectural style: Queen Anne
- NRHP reference No.: 82001862
- Added to NRHP: October 19, 1982

George Farmhouse is a historic home located near Smyrna, Kent County, Delaware. It built between about 1915 and 1920, and is a two-story, frame dwelling in the Queen Anne style. Parts of the house date to the 19th century, and the one-story and attic kitchen wing may be the oldest section of the house. It features a three-story, offset hexagonal shaped tower with a tent roof and a wraparound porch.

It was listed on the National Register of Historic Places in 1982.
