= St. Stephen's Episcopal Church (Philadelphia) =

Historic church in Pennsylvania, United States

Coordinates: 39°57′2.61″N 75°9′24.72″W

- U.S. National Register of Historic Places
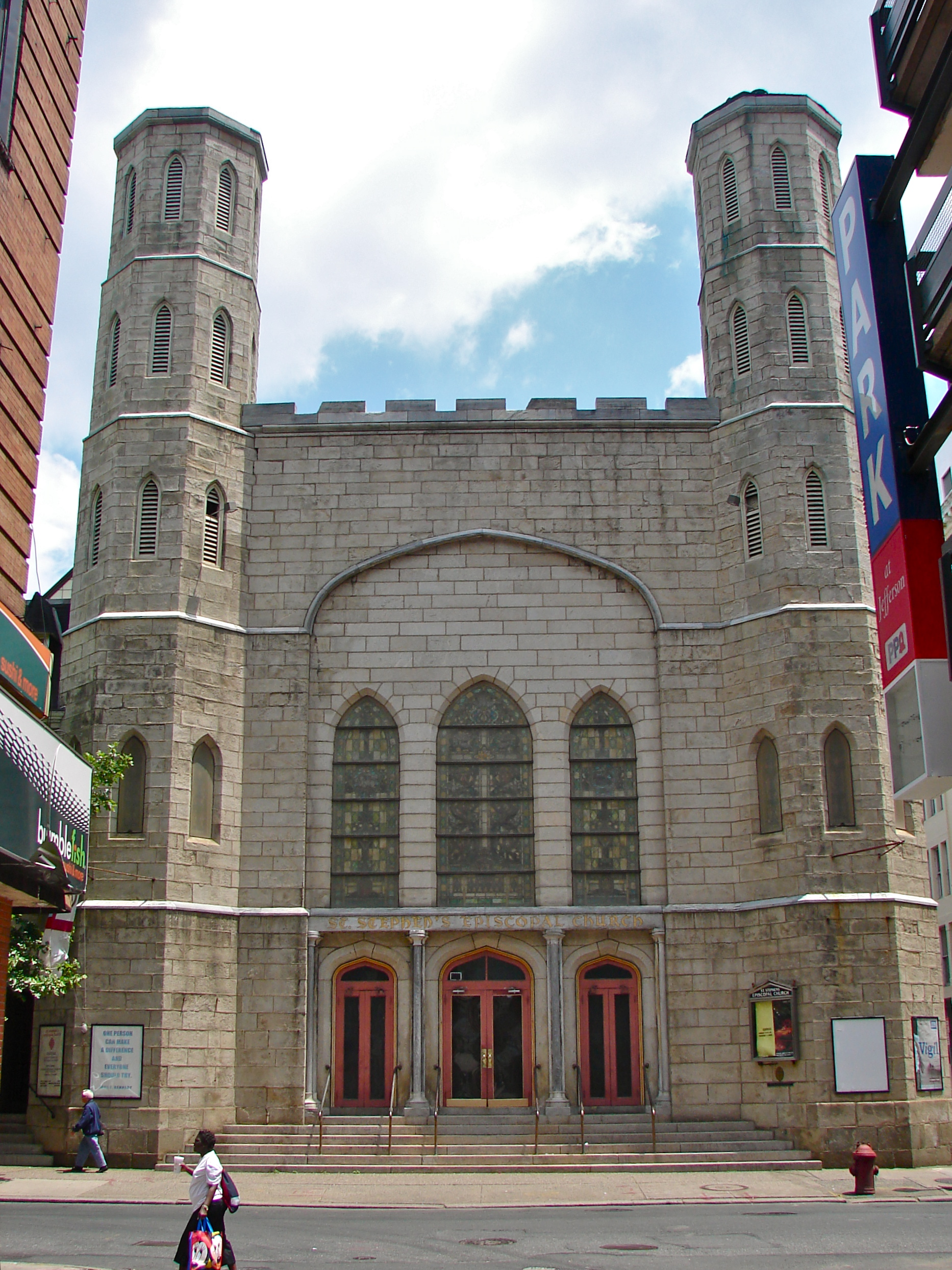

- Location within Philadelphia Location within Pennsylvania Location within the United States
- Location: 19 South 10th Street; Philadelphia, Pennsylvania
- Built: 1823
- Architect: William Strickland (1822); Frank Furness (1879)
- Architectural style: Gothic Revival
- NRHP reference No.: 79002329
- Added to NRHP: June 4, 1979

St. Stephen's Episcopal Church is a historic parish of the Episcopal Diocese of Pennsylvania, founded in 1823 in Philadelphia, Pennsylvania and located at 19 South Tenth Street, on the corner of Tenth Street and Ludlow Street. St. Stephen's was designed by William Strickland in the Gothic Revival style. It is the oldest extant building in Philadelphia in this style and was designed by an architect-engineer best known for Greek Revival buildings, though, like his mentor Benjamin Latrobe, he produced buildings in other "picturesque" styles as well. St. Stephen's first service was held on February 27, 1823. On June 4, 1979, it was added to the National Register of Historic Places. On May 28, 1957, it was designated a historic landmark by the Philadelphia Historical Commission.

The church reported 21 members in 2018 and zero members in 2023; no membership statistics were reported nationally in 2024 parochial reports. Plate and pledge income reported for the congregation in 2024 was $7,863, down from $125,634 in 2021. Average Sunday attendance (ASA) in 2023 was five persons, down from a reported 10 from 2015 to 2019.

== History ==
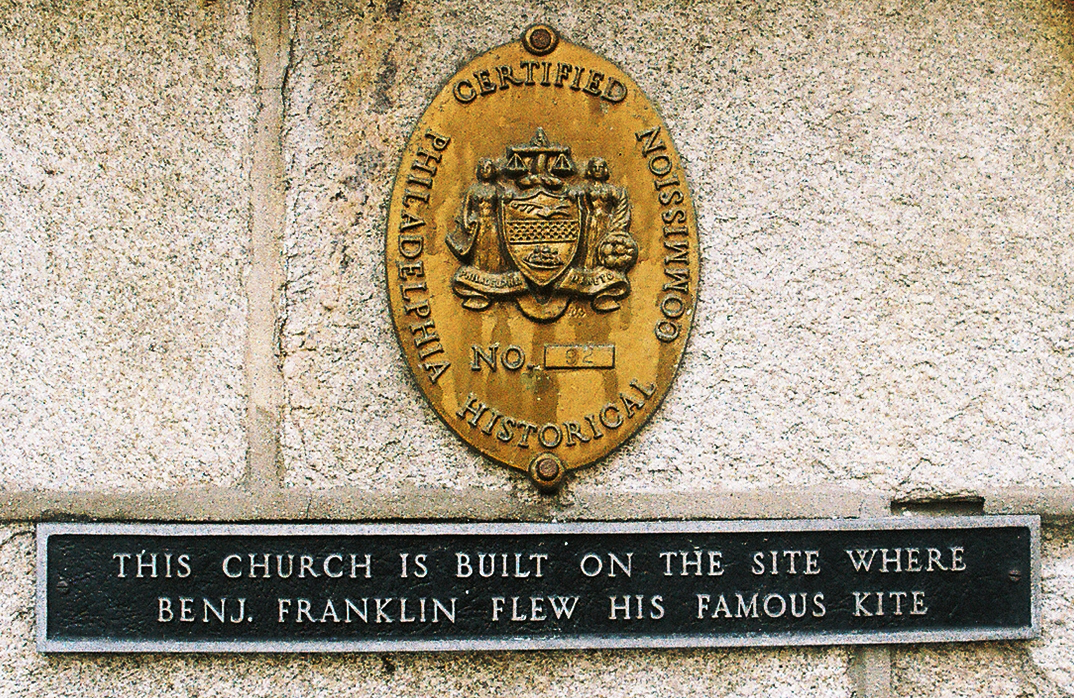
Franklin Kite Plaque

The Rev. Dr. James Montgomery, who would later become St. Stephen's first rector, bought the property in late 1821. At the time, it was occupied by a vacant Methodist meeting-house. Rev. Montgomery held his first service in the old building on January 20, 1822. William Strickland was hired as an architect for "improvements", but the result was a significantly different building, with only a small section of the old meetinghouse unchanged. Bishop William White laid the cornerstone of the new church on May 30, 1822; he also consecrated the building on February 27, 1823. The church offset the costs of the construction by selling portions of their land for burial use.

Called "bold" in its time, St. Stephen's is an example of Philadelphia's earliest Gothic Revival buildings that responded to the great local demand for this type since the 1780s. Long considered "misunderstood" Gothic, this early or "Georgian" Gothic, popular in 18th-century Britain, recalls the architecture of Protestant Tudor England (1485–1603) rather than the high Gothic of the Pre-Reformation 12th century that inspired the familiar Gothic Revival from the 1830s on. Architect Frank Furness added a transept and vestry room in 1878.

A plaque on the outside front wall, apparently unrelated to the oval Philadelphia Historical Commission marker above it, reads: "THIS CHURCH IS BUILT ON THE SITE WHERE BENJ. FRANKLIN FLEW HIS FAMOUS KITE," though the history of the marker is unclear.

== Artwork ==
The sanctuary contains a great deal of artwork from throughout the church's history. Sculptor Carl Johann Steinhauser was commissioned to create two sculptures for the church: the "Angel of the Resurrection" (also known as the Burd Children's Memorial, for three of the children of Edward Shippen Burd and Eliza Howard Sims Burd) in 1852 and the Burd Baptismal font, completed in 1857. Architect Richard Upjohn designed a side chapel (1849–1853) to house the Burd Children's Monument. Other artwork includes the Burd Canopy Tomb (c. 1860), designed by architect Frank Wills and sculpted by Henry Kirke Brown; various memorials to former rectors; and, until it was purchased by the Philadelphia Museum of Art in 2004, the sculpture The Angel of Purity by Augustus Saint-Gaudens.

The sanctuary features stained glass windows created by D'Ascenzo Studios as well as Louis Comfort Tiffany of Tiffany Studios. Architect Henry Holiday designed two of the stained glass windows in the sanctuary in addition to the Venetian glass mosaic of The Last Supper (1887–1889) above the altar.

== Rectors ==
In the Episcopal Church in the United States of America, the rector is the priest elected to head a self-supporting parish.

- The Rev. Dr. James Montgomery (1823–1834)
- The Rev. Dr. H. W. Ducachet (1834–1865)
- The Rev. Dr. William Rudder (1865–1880)
- The Rev. Dr. Samuel D. McConnell (1882–1896)
- The Rev. Dr. Elwood Worcester (1896–1904)
- The Rev. Dr. Carl E. Grammer (1905–1936)
- The Rev. Dr. Vincent C. Franks (1937–1939)
- The Rev. Dr. Alfred W. Price (1942–)
- The Rev. Roy Hendricks (1971–1983)
- The Rev. Patricia A. Oglesby, interim (1983–1985)
- The Rev. Robert A. Schiesler (1985–1990)
- The Rev. Charles T. Flood Priest-in-Charge and then rector (1990–2016)
- The Rev. Peter Kountz, PhD, Vicar (2016–2019) and then Priest-in-Residence (2019–present)
- The Rev. Michael Giansiracusa, Vicar (2019–present)

== See also ==
- St. Peter's Church, Philadelphia
- Saint Mary's Church, Hamilton Village
- Lantern Theater Company
