= Carl E. Grammer =

American Episcopal Priest

Carl Eckhardt Grammer (November 11, 1858 – March 17, 1944) was a prominent Episcopal priest, author, and commentator on American Indian affairs. He was an exponent of liberal evangelical positions in church controversy. Grammer was a supporter of women's suffrage and a widely published opponent of the American Missal.

Grammer was born in Smyrna, Delaware and studied at Johns Hopkins (B.A. 1880), the Virginia Theological Seminary (1884), and Trinity College, Hartford (S.T.D. 1895). He was ordained to the priesthood on July 3, 1889, and served parishes in Maryland, Ohio, and Virginia. Grammer was professor of Church History at Virginia Theological Seminary from 1887 to 1898, and rector of St. Stephen's Church, Philadelphia from 1905 to 1936. He was president of the Evangelical Education Society of the Protestant Episcopal Church, and the board of directors of Sweet Briar College. He was also a president of the Armstrong Association for the Advancement of the Colored Race.

He died in Summit, New Jersey.

== Works ==
- An Examination of the So-Called American Missal (no date) from Project Canterbury and from Internet Archive from Philadelphia Studies
- The Meaning of the Thirty-nine Articles: Why I Think They Should Be Retained (no date)
- Three Objectionable Proposals in the Third Report (Joint Committee on the Book of Common Prayer, no date)
- What Shall I Do, Then, with Jesus Which Is Called Christ? A Sermon Preached in the Chapel of the University of Virginia, October 2, 1898 (1898)
- General Richard Lucien Page: A Memorial Sermon in Christ Church, Norfolk (1901)
- The Nature and Content of Holy Orders in This Church: A Paper Read before the Church Congress in Brooklyn, New York (1905)
- A Sermon in Memory of Ludovic Colquhoun Cleemann, Accounting Warden of St. Stephen's P.E. Church (1911)
- A Discourse on the Proposal to Change the Name of the Protestant Episcopal Church: A Pamphlet by the Rev. Carl E Grammer (1913)
- Responsibility for Indian Management (Indian Rights Association, 1914)
- A Sermon Preached in Memory of Mrs. S. Weir Mitchell by the Rev. Carl E. Grammer at St. Stephen's Church, Philadelphia (1914)
- Shall Public Funds Be Expended for the Support of Sectarian Indian schools? (1915)
- Heaven on Earth: A Parochial Sermon (1916) from Philadelphia Studies
- National Protection for Oklahoma Indians: Dangerous Legislation Proposed Affecting the Five Civilized Tribes (1916)
- Chippewa Indians Threatened (1916)
- The Church League, Its Necessity and Its Liberality (c. 1916)
- Dr. William Sparrow: An Address Delivered at the Dedication of Sparrow Hall Theological Seminary in Virginia, June 4, 1925 (1925)
- (Bohlen Lectures, 1928)
- Things That Remain (Macmillan, 1929)
- Sermon in Memory of the Rt. Rev. Thomas J. Garland, Bishop of Pennsylvania, Preached at St. Stephen’s Church, Philadelphia (1931)
- Critical and Historical Estimates of the Oxford Movement of 1833 (Philadelphia, 1934)
- Jesus as a Teacher of Eternal Verities (1935)
- An Examination of the Report of the Archbishops' Commission on Doctrine in the Church of England (1938)
- The Evangelical Attitude Toward the Prayer Book (1939)
