= Belmont Hall (Smyrna, Delaware) =

Historic house in Delaware, United States

- U.S. National Register of Historic Places
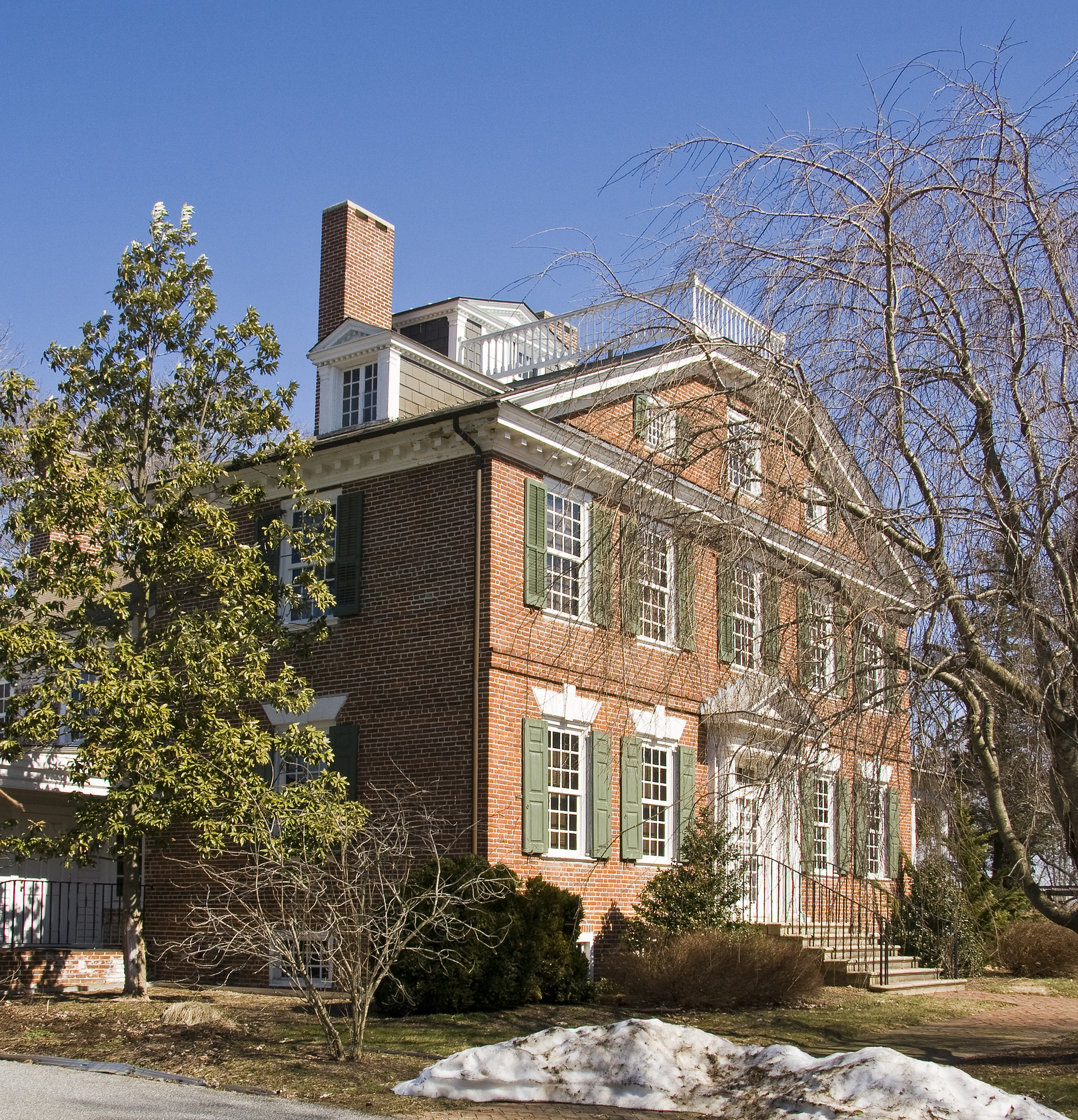
- Belmont Hall, March 2010

- Location within Delaware Location within the United States
- Location: 217 Smyrna-Leipsic Road, Smyrna, Delaware
- Coordinates: 39.294501°N 75.595902°W
- Area: 4 acres (1.6 ha)
- Architectural style: Georgian
- NRHP reference No.: 71000223
- Added to NRHP: December 16, 1971

Belmont Hall is a Georgian house located in Smyrna, Delaware, built about 1773 by Thomas Collins, who would become the eighth governor of Delaware. The front façade faces US 13.

== Description ==
The brick house front is five bays wide and three stories tall, surmounted by a flattened gable. The crown of the gable is flattened to form a widow's walk, accessed by a projecting stair tower to the rear of the walk. The house is wide but shallow, one room deep with two rear wings projecting to the north, which were built before the front. The front portion is 46 feet (14 m) wide by 21.25 feet (6.48 m) deep.

The interior plan is oriented around a central hall, flanked by parlors on either side. A stair rises from the hall, and is flanked by bedrooms on the second and third floors. Extensive interior woodwork is located primarily in the entrance hall and the west parlor. The interior was renovated during the Victorian era, but was restored in the 1920s.

== History ==
Six hundred acres (240 ha) were granted to Henry Pearman by William Penn in 1684, and became known as "Pearman's Choice." A small brick house was built on this property. This house and two hundred acres were sold to Andrew Love in 1691. The property was bought by Thomas Collins, who would become High Sheriff of Kent County and later a brigadier general in the Continental Army, eventually rising to the governorship of Delaware. He added the present front about 1773. In 1777 a British party attempting to capture Collins shot a sentry posted on the widow's walk, who died in the room below. His death is commemorated by a plaque in the front hall presented by the Daughters of the American Revolution. Thomas Collins, the only person to be unanimously elected by the Assembly, had the honor of serving as the 8th President/Governor of Delaware from 1786 until his death in 1789. Collins died at Belmont Hall in 1789.

In 1827, John Cloak acquired Belmont and farmed the land according to scientific principles. Belmont brand canned tomatoes became popular in the late 19th century.

A fire in 1922 gutted the third floor. The existing east and west dormers were added during repairs. The Cloak/Speakman family retained the property into the 1980s. It was sold to the State of Delaware in 1987, as part of a deal to acquire 30 acres (12 ha) for the Route 13 bypass around Smyrna.
