= Mount Pleasant (Smyrna, Delaware) =

Historic house in Delaware, United States

- U.S. National Register of Historic Places
- Location within Delaware Location within the United States
- Location: 5 Margie Drive, Smyrna, Delaware
- Coordinates: 39.277260°N 75.607507°W
- Area: 9 acres (3.6 ha)
- Built: c. 1810
- Architectural style: Georgian / Federal
- MPS: Dwellings of the Rural Elite in Central Delaware MPS
- NRHP reference No.: 92001134
- Added to NRHP: September 11, 1992

Mount Pleasant, also known as the Samuel Cahoon House, is a historic home located near Smyrna, Kent County, Delaware. It built about 1810, and consists of a two-story, five-bay, gable-roofed brick main house with an interior brick chimney stack at either gable end and a one-story, gable-roofed brick kitchen wing. It is in a late Georgian / Federal vernacular style and measures 43 feet by 25 feet. Also on the property are a contributing early 19th-century smokehouse and barn.

It was listed on the National Register of Historic Places in 1992.
