= Kevin Fleming =

American photographer

Bruce Kevin Fleming is an American photographer who worked with National Geographic and published photography books focused on Delaware’s landscapes and wildlife. In 2020, he pled guilty to federal tax evasion, resulting in a one-year prison sentence and a requirement to pay restitution for unpaid taxes.

== Career ==
Fleming began his photography career in 1968, working for his Smyrna High School newspaper. He then joined the Delaware State News and later moved on to The News Journal, where he worked as a roving photographer. His assignments ranged from covering the Delaware General Assembly to photographing the 1971 University of Delaware’s championship game. He transmitted the first color photograph in The News Journal's history.

In 1981, Fleming joined National Geographic. His first major assignment was in documenting the Sinai Peninsula after the Camp David Accords. During this assignment, he witnessed the assassination of Egyptian president Anwar Sadat on October 6, 1981. Standing near Sadat, Fleming captured images of the attack, some of which were published internationally. Throughout his decade with National Geographic, Fleming documented a range of subjects, including a summer spent recreating the voyage of Odysseus in Greece and covering the Somali refugee crisis. He was described as "America's Best Observer" by Reader's Digest.

Fleming transitioned from fieldwork to publishing photography books. His book Landmarks and Legacies documented over 50 Delaware landmarks. In 2014, he published The Beach, a coffee table book featuring images from Delaware's coast; the book reportedly sold 5,000 copies within its first five weeks. Fleming ran a photo gallery in Rehoboth Beach, Delaware.

In 2020, Fleming faced legal charges related to tax evasion. He pled guilty on August 26, 2020, to charges of failing to file federal income tax returns and failing to pay taxes withheld from employees. He admitted that he had not filed taxes since 1981. On October 26, 2021, he was sentenced to one year in prison and ordered to pay $215,113 in restitution to the IRS.

== Personal life ==
Fleming has 2 children including photographer Jay Fleming.
