= Short's Landing Hotel Complex =

Historic hotel and farm in Delaware, US

- U.S. National Register of Historic Places
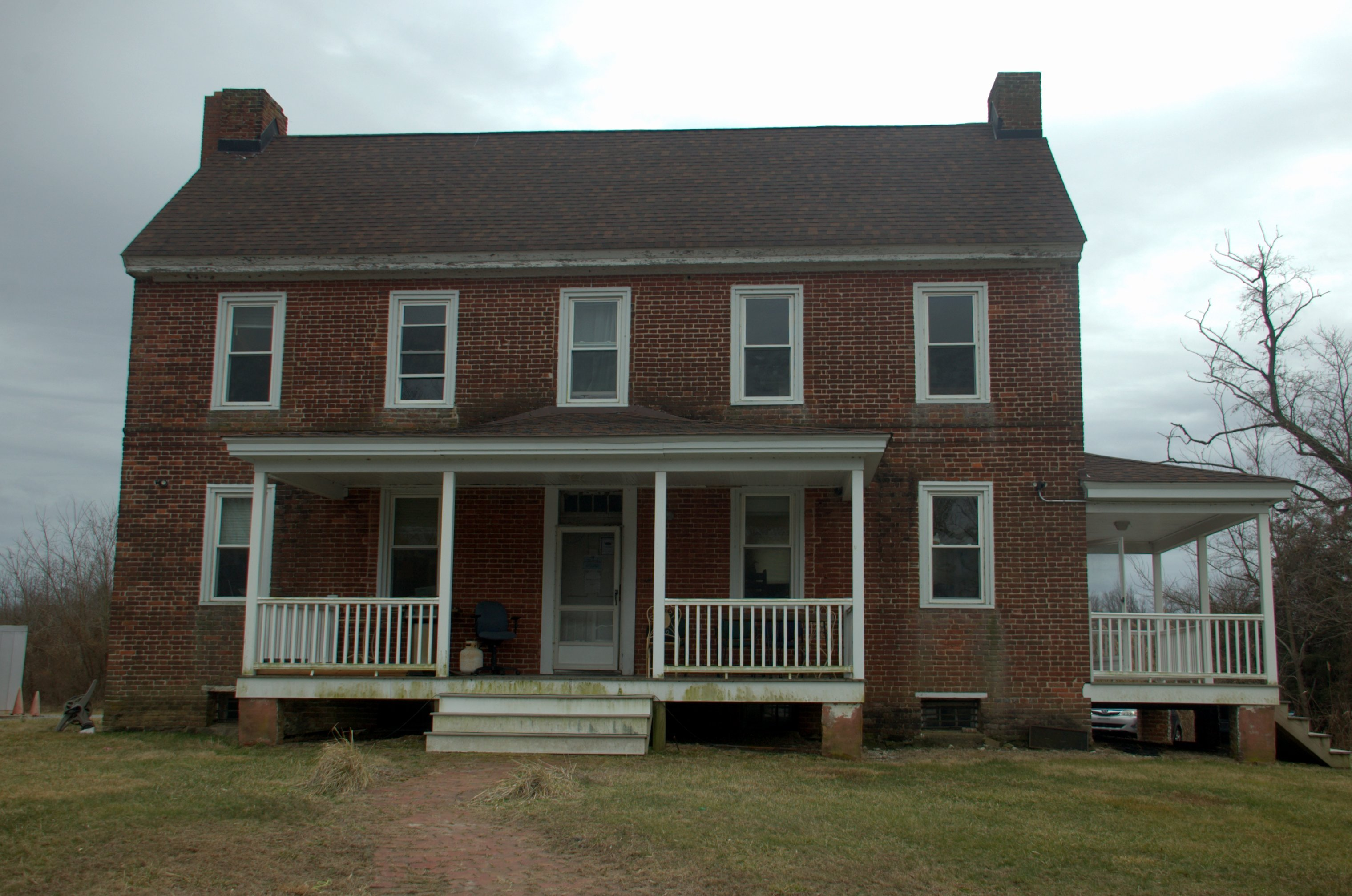

- Location within Delaware Location within the United States
- Location: 6180 Hay Point Landing Road, near Smyrna, Delaware
- Coordinates: 39.346959°N 75.536639°W
- Area: 91.8 acres (37.2 ha)
- Built: 1780
- Architectural style: Federal
- NRHP reference No.: 83003506
- Added to NRHP: October 17, 1983

Short's Landing Hotel Complex is a historic hotel and farm complex located near Smyrna, Kent County, Delaware. The complex consists of five contributing buildings and one contributing structure. They are the brick hotel (c. 1780), a frame Federal-style mansion house (c. 1800), a small abandoned factory, and an extensive collection of outbuildings including a stable, granaries and storage sheds. The hotel is a two-story, five bay brick vernacular structure. The frame mansion house has a traditional center-hall, single-pile floor plan. The frame leadite factory was in operation mainly from the 1920s to the late 1940s.

It was listed on the National Register of Historic Places in 1983.
