= Moore House (Smyrna, Delaware) =

Historic house in Delaware, United States

- U.S. National Register of Historic Places
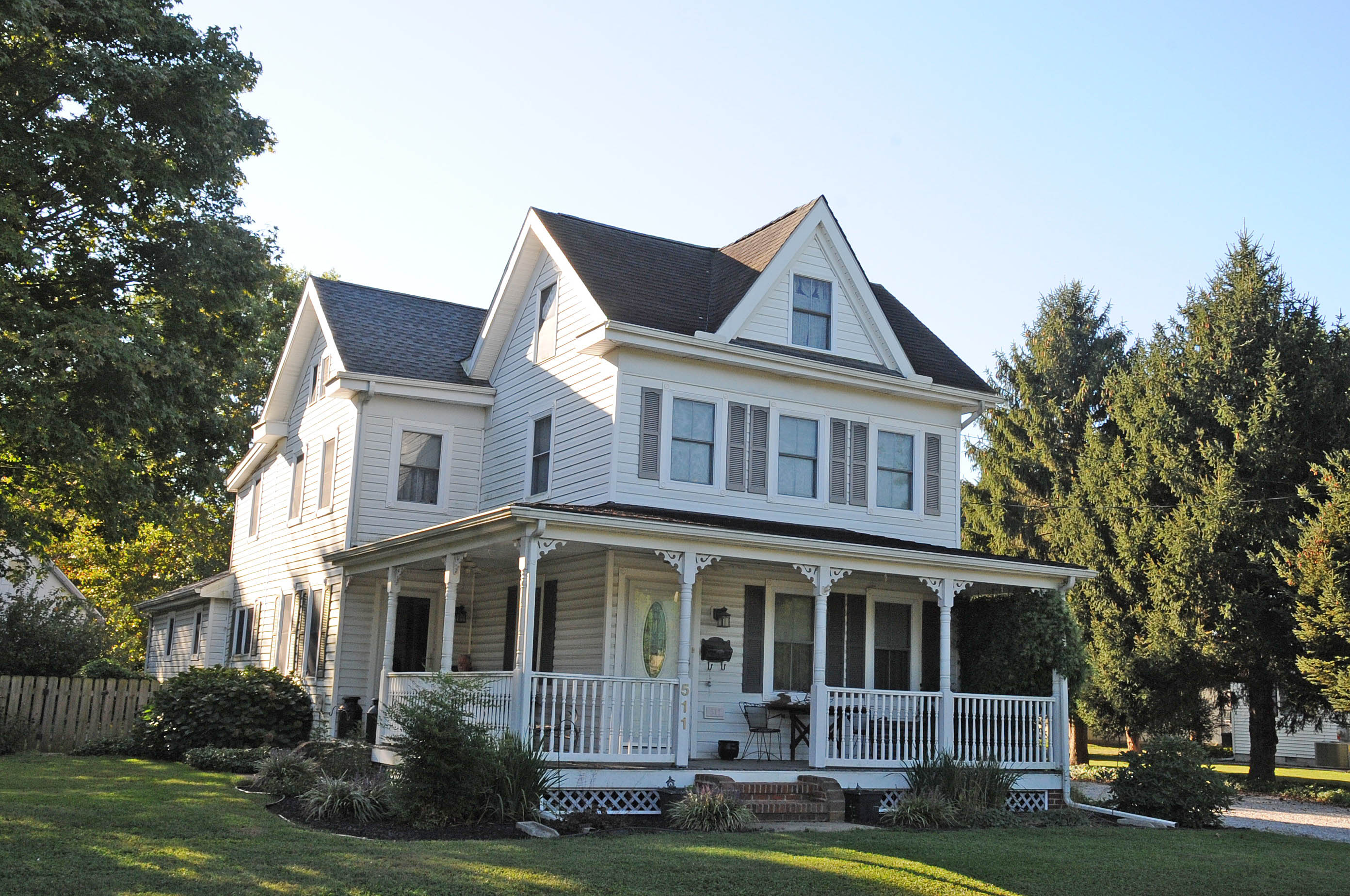
- Moore House in 2017.

- Location within Delaware Location within the United States
- Location: 511 W. Mt. Vernon St., Smyrna, Delaware
- Coordinates: 39.295944°N 75.614211°W
- Area: 1.3 acres (0.53 ha)
- Built: 1868
- Built by: Moore, Robert
- Architectural style: Italianate, Gothic Revival
- NRHP reference No.: 82001022
- Added to NRHP: October 19, 1982

Moore House is a historic home located at Smyrna, Kent County, Delaware. It was built in 1868, and is a two-story, frame dwelling with Italianate and Gothic Revival style decorative detail. It has an unusual, off-set double-pile, "house-on-house" plan. It has a cross-gable roof with a distinctive cornice and a wraparound porch.

It was listed on the National Register of Historic Places in 1982.
