= Smyrna School District =

Public school district in northern Kent County

Location
- 82 Monrovia Avenue, Smyrna DE 19977 Northern Kent County and southern New Castle County, Delaware United States

District information
- Type: Public
- Grades: K−12
- Superintendent: Deborah Judy

Students and staff
- Students: 6,010
- Teachers: 378
- Athletic conference: Henlopen North Conference
- District mascot: Eagle
- Colors: Red and white

Other information
- Website: Official Site

The Smyrna School District is a public school district in northern Kent County and extreme southern New Castle County, Delaware in the United States. The district is based in Smyrna.

== History ==
The Smyrna Special School District and Kenton School District 9 were reorganized into the Smyrna School District on July 1, 1969.

== Geography ==
The Smyrna School District serves the northern portion Kent County and the extreme southern portion of New Castle County in the state of Delaware. Communities served by the district include Smyrna, Clayton, and Kenton as well as a portion of Leipsic.

== Administration ==
- Deborah Judy, Superintendent
- Stacy Cook, Assistant Superintendent
- Amber Augustus, Director of Teaching & Learning
- Steven Gott, Director of Finance
- Denise Robbins, Director of Human Resources
- Kate Marvel, Supervisor of Workforce Development
- Kristen Kahl, Supervisor of Child Nutrition
- Ryan Buchanan, Supervisor of Instruction
- Phillip Davis, Supervisor of School Safety
- Kariem Ross, Marketing & Communications Specialist; Webmaster

== Schools ==
High school

- Smyrna High School

Middle school

- Smyrna Middle School

Intermediate schools

- Clayton Intermediate School
- Moore (John Bassett) Intermediate School

Elementary schools

- Clayton Elementary School
- North Smyrna Elementary School
- Smyrna Elementary School
- Sunnyside Elementary School

== See also ==
- List of school districts in Delaware
