= John M. Voshell House =

Historic house in Delaware, US

- U.S. National Register of Historic Places
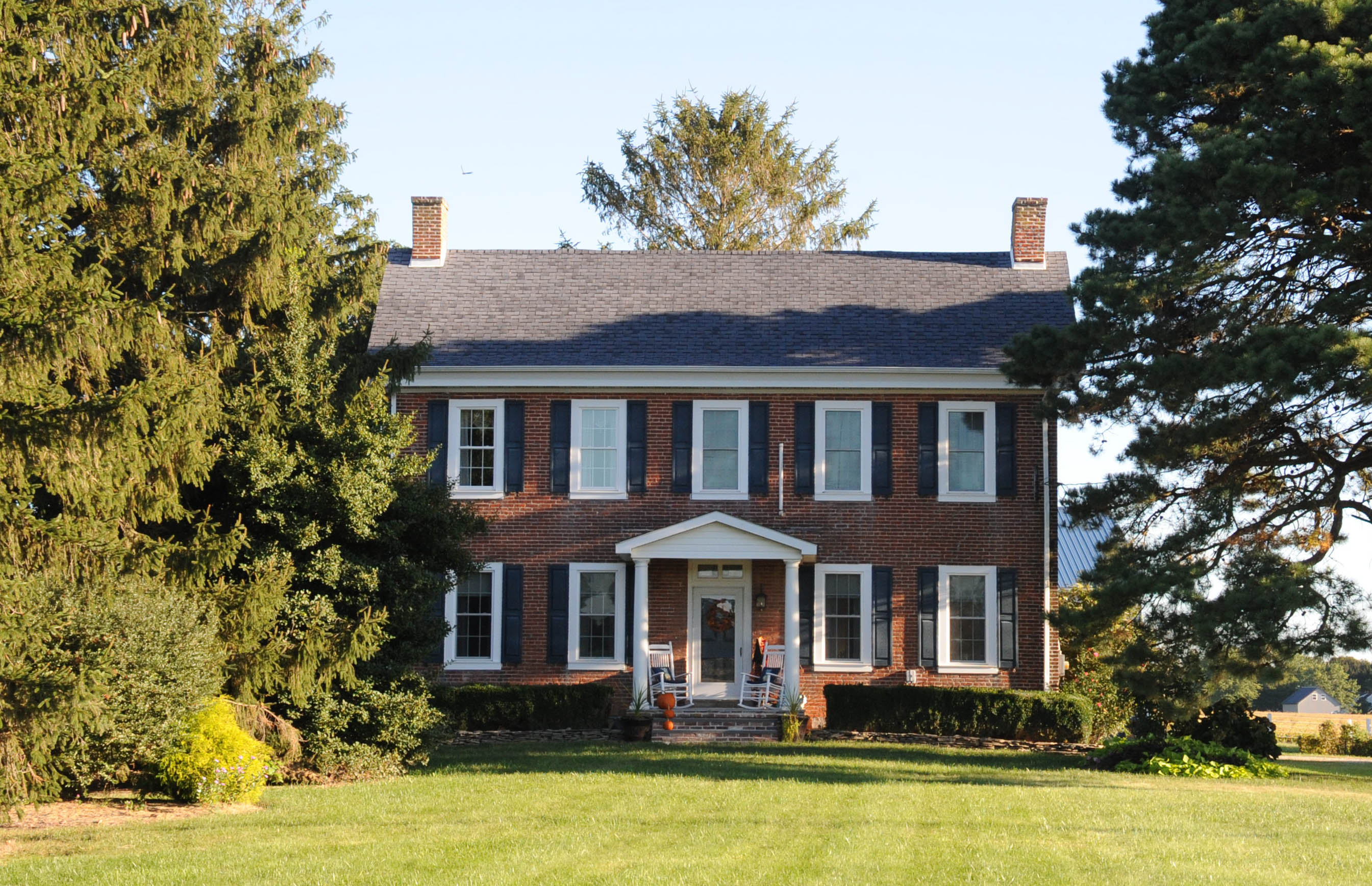

- Location within Delaware Location within the United States
- Location: 887 Hawkey Branch Road, near Smyrna, Delaware
- Coordinates: 39.301491°N 75.518210°W
- Area: 1.4 acres (0.57 ha)
- Built: c. 1850
- Architectural style: Italianate, Federal, Greek Revival
- NRHP reference No.: 83003507
- Added to NRHP: October 6, 1983

John M. Voshell House is a historic home located near Smyrna, Kent County, Delaware. It was built in about 1850, and is a two-story, five-bay L-shaped brick dwelling with a gable roof. The roof has a heavy cornice and wide overhang in the Italianate style. It has a Federal style entrance and Greek Revival-style porch.

It was listed on the National Register of Historic Places in 1983.
