= Delaware Municipal Electric Corporation =

Electric utility in Delaware, USA

- Company type: Public utility
- Founded: July 12, 1979
- Headquarters: Smyrna, Delaware, United States
- Key people: Kimberly A. Schlichting (President and CEO)
- Website: http://www.demecinc.net/

The Delaware Municipal Electric Corporation (DEMEC) is a Joint Action Agency and wholesale electric utility that represents nine municipal electric departments in the state of Delaware in the United States. The agency, which was created in 1979, is headquartered in Smyrna.

== About ==
DEMEC is Joint Action Agency and wholesale electric utility that represents nine municipal electric departments in the state of Delaware in the United States, which consists of all the major cities and towns in Delaware except Wilmington. The agency's members combined provide electricity to over 125,000 customers and have a peak load of over 460 MW. DEMEC serves as the generation owner and PJM Interconnection load serving entity for eight of the municipal electric departments (the exception being Dover), providing all of the wholesale electric supply to these communities, while DEMEC provides partial wholesale electric supply to Dover. The agency also provides legal and technical consulting service to its nine members and represents them at the federal and regional level.

DEMEC is governed by a nine-member Board of Directors which consists of one director from each electric department. The Board of Directors appoints a President and CEO who is in charge of the daily operations of the agency.

DEMEC owns a generation plant in Smyrna that consists of two 50 MW units, supplying electricity to seven of its member utilities. The agency purchases solar power from the Dover SUN Park in Dover, which is owned by SunPower and supplies electricity to the city of Dover, and the Milford Solar Farm in Milford, which is owned by the Public Service Enterprise Group. Solar power is also produced from smaller facilities in DEMEC's member utilities' communities. DEMEC purchases wind power from the Laurel Hill Wind Farm in Lycoming County, Pennsylvania and from a 2 MW turbine at the University of Delaware's Hugh R. Sharp Campus in Lewes.

== Members ==
DEMEC's membership is composed of nine municipal electric departments in Delaware:

- City of Dover Electric Department
- City of Milford Electric Department
- City of Newark Electric Department
- City of Seaford Electric Department
- Lewes Board of Public Works
- Municipal Services Commission of the City of New Castle
- Town of Clayton Electric Department
- Town of Middletown Electric Department
- Town of Smyrna Electric Department

== History ==
DEMEC was created by an act of the Delaware General Assembly on June 6, 1978, and was incorporated on July 12, 1979. In 2002, DEMEC constructed a 50 MW generation plant in Smyrna at a cost of $35 million. A second 50 MW unit was added at this plant in June 2012.
