= Carl Johann Steinhäuser =

German sculptor

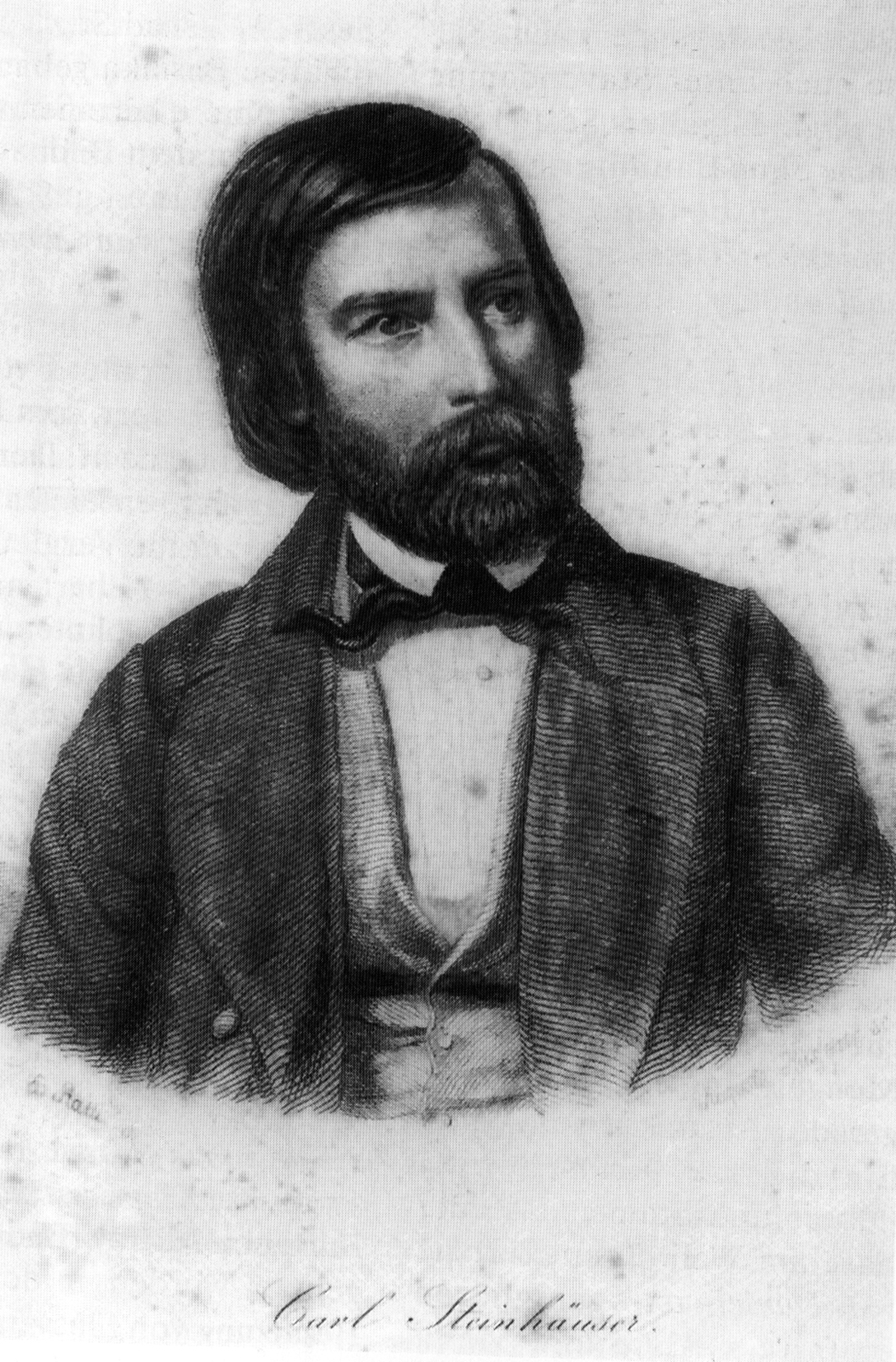
Carl Johann Steinhäuser

Carl Johann Steinhäuser (3 July 1813 – 9 December 1879) was a German sculptor in the classical style.

Steinhäuser was born in Bremen, the eldest son of a wood carver and sculptor. There he studied in the School of Drawing under painter and illustrator Stephen Messerer, then under Christian Rauch at the Berliner Akademie der Künste in Berlin. From 1835 to 1863 he lived in Rome, where he studied with Bertel Thorvaldsen, then served as professor of art at Karlsruhe until his death.

Today he is best known for his Bremen memorials to Heinrich Wilhelm Matthäus Olbers and Johann Smidt, his Weimar sculpture of Goethe mit der Psyche, and his Hermann and Dorothea in Karlsruhe. Steinhäuser's work is represented in the United States by the "Angel of the Resurrection" for the Burd Family Memorial, commissioned in 1849 for the interior of St. Stephen's Episcopal Church in Philadelphia, and for a copy of his Orestes and Pylades marble sculpture at the Palace Park in Karlsruhe erected by his former student Herman Kirn in Fairmount Park, Philadelphia, in 1884.

Among Steinhäuser's other students were Otto Lessing and Karl Friedrich Moest.

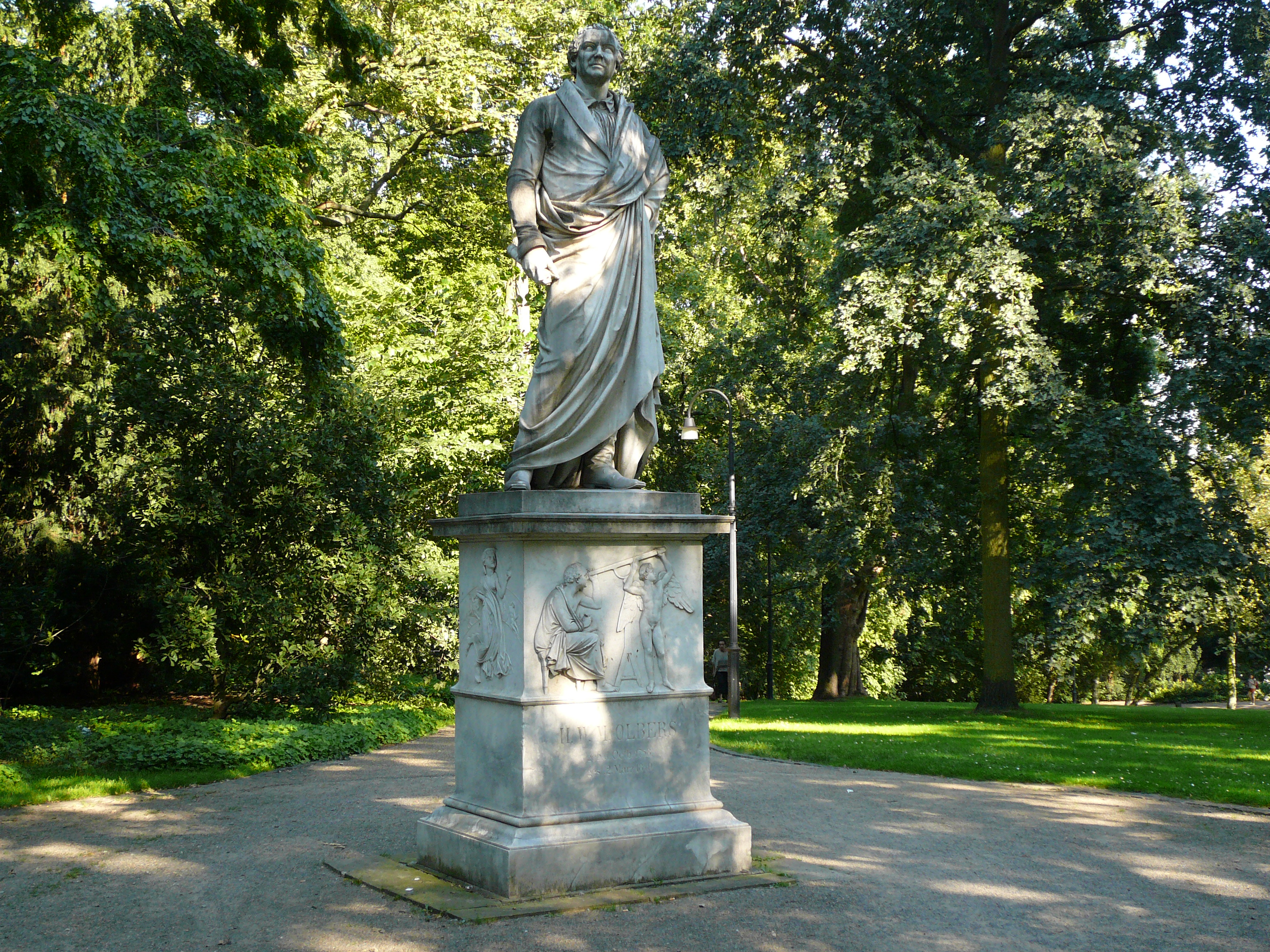
Olbers Monument

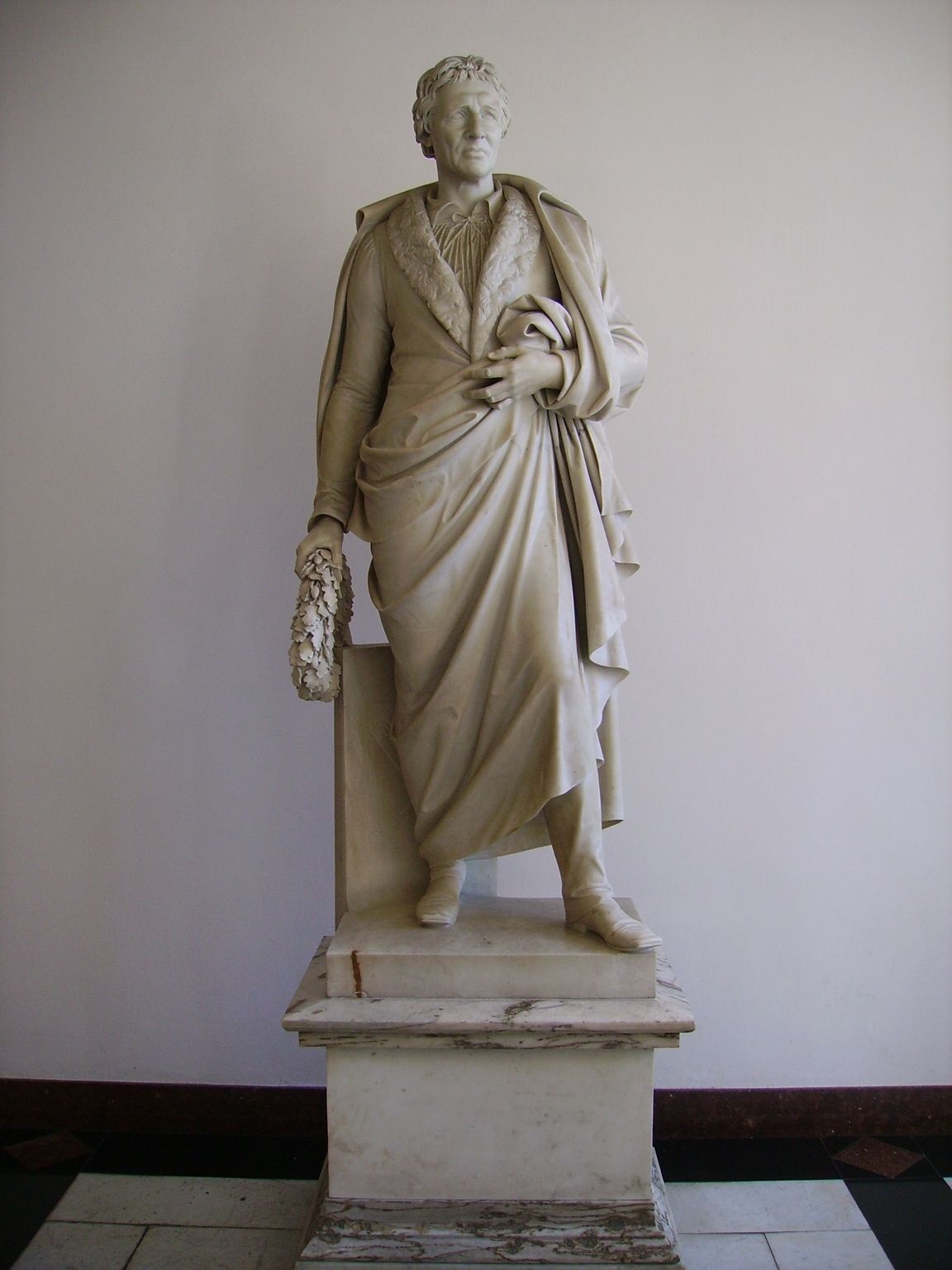
Memorial to Johann Smidt, Town Hall, Bremen

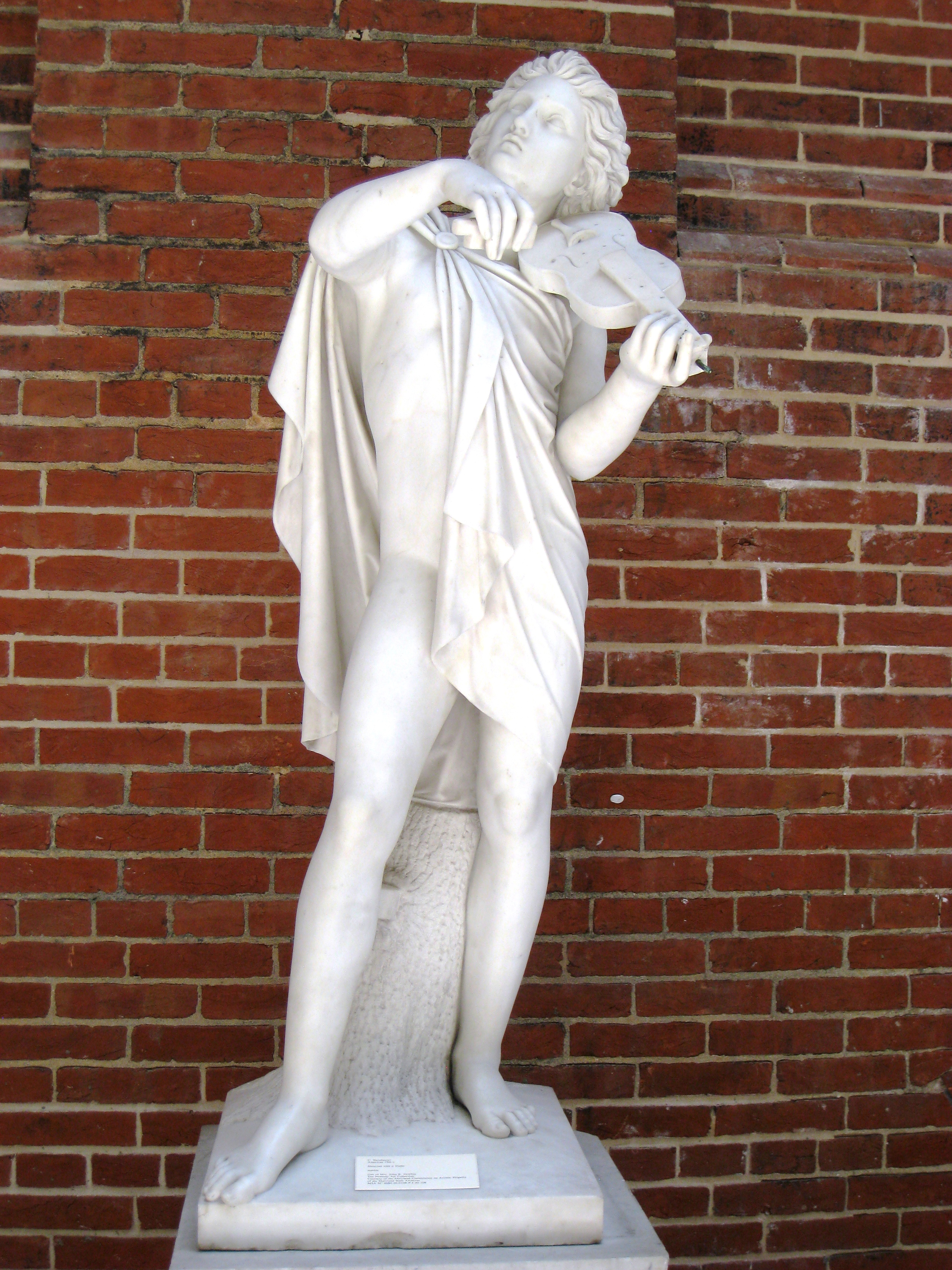
Musician with a Violin
