= Smyrna, Delaware =

- Town
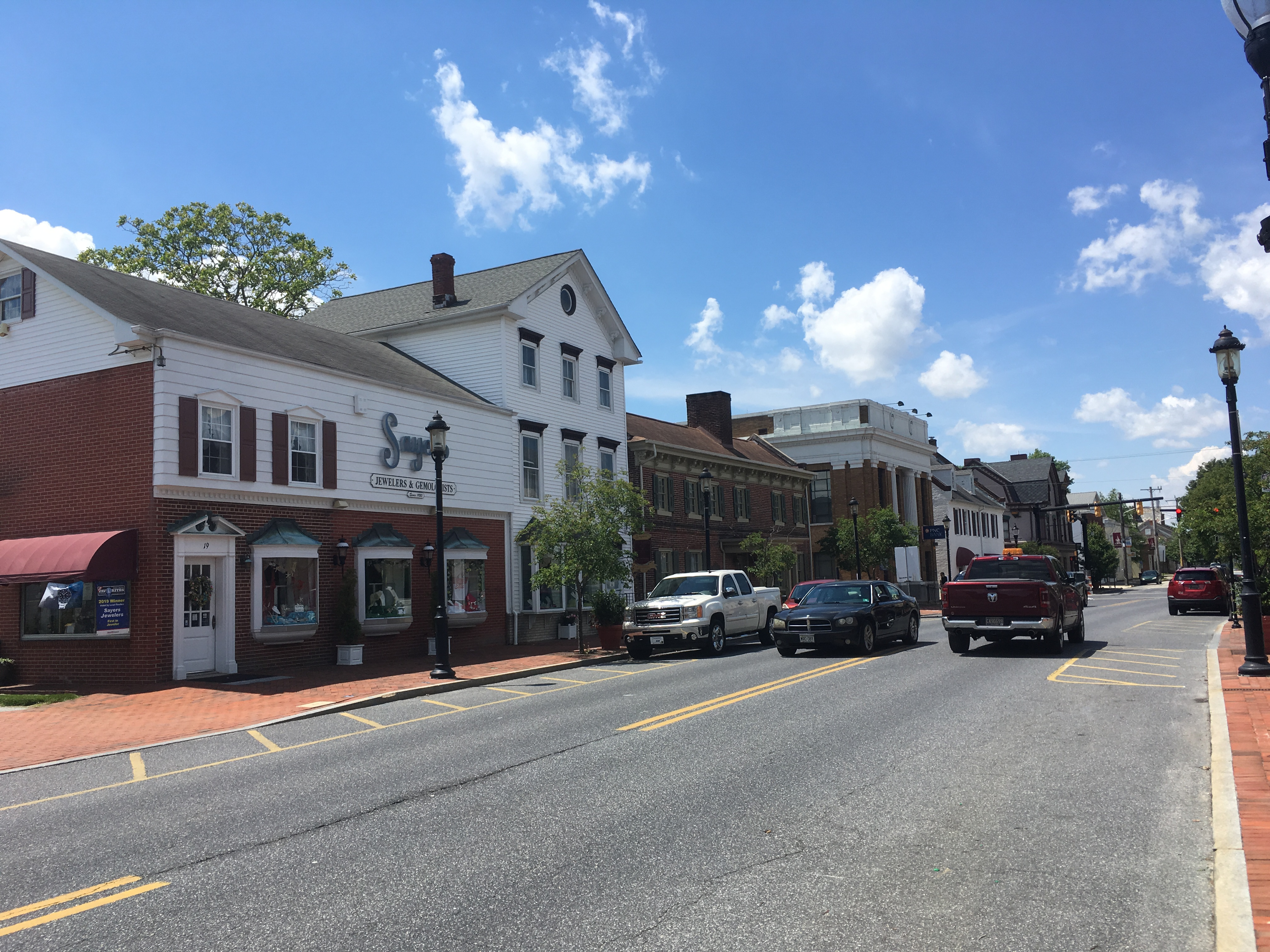
- South Main Street in Smyrna

- Flag Seal Logo
- Etymology: Ancient Greek seaport of Smyrna
- Location of Smyrna in Kent County and New Castle County, Delaware.

- Location within the state of Delaware Smyrna (the United States)
- Coordinates: 39°17′59″N 75°36′17″W
- Country: United States
- State: Delaware
- County: Kent, New Castle

Government
  - Type: Mayor-council
  - Mayor: Tabitha Gott

Area
  - Total: 6.31 sq mi (16.34 km^{2})
  - Land: 6.24 sq mi (16.17 km^{2})
  - Water: 0.066 sq mi (0.17 km^{2})
- Elevation: 33 ft (10 m)

Population (2020)
  - Total: 12,883
  - Density: 2,063.3/sq mi (796.66/km^{2})
- Time zone: UTC−5 (Eastern (EST))
  - Summer (DST): UTC−4 (EDT)
- ZIP code: 19977
- Area code: 302
- FIPS code: 10-67310
- GNIS feature ID: 214671
- Website: smyrna.delaware.gov

Smyrna is a town in Kent and New Castle counties in the U.S. state of Delaware. The section in Kent County is part of the Dover metropolitan statistical area while the portion in New Castle County is a part of the Philadelphia metropolitan area. According to the U.S. Census Bureau, as of 2020, the population of the town is 12,883.

The international jurist John Bassett Moore was born in Smyrna, as were politicians Louis McLane and James Williams.

== History ==
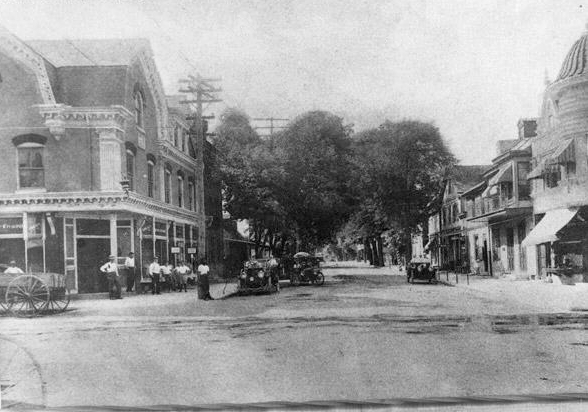
Main Street looking north, 1906

Smyrna was originally called Duck Creek Cross Roads and was renamed Smyrna in 1806, taking its name from the ancient city of Smyrna (modern-day İzmir, Türkiye), a historic port city on the Aegean coast of Anatolia. The town was located along the north–south King's Highway. Smyrna was originally a shipping center along the Duck Creek and was the most important port between Wilmington and Lewes, shipping grain, lumber, tanbark, and produce to points north. After the shipping industry collapsed in the 1850s, the town continued to be an agricultural center.

The Bannister Hall and Baynard House, Belmont Hall, David J. Cummins House, Timothy Cummins House, Duck Creek Village, George Farmhouse, Ivy Dale Farm, Mount Pleasant, Moore House, Peterson and Mustard's Hermitage Farm, Savin-Wilson House, Short's Landing Hotel Complex, Smyrna Historic District, John M. Voshell House, and Woodlawn are listed on the National Register of Historic Places.

== Geography ==
According to the United States Census Bureau, the town has a total area of 3.8 square miles (9.8 km^{2}), of which 3.7 square miles (9.6 km^{2}) is land and 0.1 square miles (0.26 km^{2}) (2.13%) is water.

=== Climate ===
The climate in this area is characterized by hot, humid summers and generally mild to cool winters. According to the Köppen Climate Classification system, Smyrna has a humid subtropical climate, abbreviated "Cfa" on climate maps.

Climate data for Smyrna, Delaware
Month	Jan	Feb	Mar	Apr	May	Jun	Jul	Aug	Sep	Oct	Nov	Dec	Year
Record high °F (°C)	77 (25)	80 (27)	87 (31)	97 (36)	98 (37)	100 (38)	104 (40)	102 (39)	98 (37)	95 (35)	85 (29)	75 (24)	104 (40)
Mean daily maximum °F (°C)	43 (6)	47 (8)	55 (13)	66 (19)	75 (24)	83 (28)	87 (31)	85 (29)	79 (26)	69 (21)	59 (15)	47 (8)	66 (19)
Mean daily minimum °F (°C)	27 (−3)	29 (−2)	36 (2)	44 (7)	54 (12)	63 (17)	69 (21)	67 (19)	60 (16)	49 (9)	40 (4)	31 (−1)	47 (8)
Record low °F (°C)	−7 (−22)	−11 (−24)	7 (−14)	14 (−10)	28 (−2)	41 (5)	45 (7)	35 (2)	30 (−1)	25 (−4)	11 (−12)	−3 (−19)	−11 (−24)
Average precipitation inches (mm)	3.41 (87)	3.18 (81)	4.31 (109)	3.88 (99)	4.25 (108)	4.00 (102)	4.09 (104)	4.36 (111)	4.13 (105)	3.42 (87)	3.48 (88)	3.65 (93)	46.16 (1,174)
Source: The Weather Channel

== Demographics ==
Historical population
Census	Pop.	Note	%±
1860	1,873		—
1870	2,110		12.7%
1880	2,428		15.1%
1890	2,455		1.1%
1900	2,168		−11.7%
1910	1,843		−15.0%
1920	1,953		6.0%
1930	1,958		0.3%
1940	1,870		−4.5%
1950	2,346		25.5%
1960	3,241		38.2%
1970	4,243		30.9%
1980	4,750		11.9%
1990	5,231		10.1%
2000	5,679		8.6%
2010	10,023		76.5%
2020	12,883		28.5%
U.S. Decennial Census

=== Racial and ethnic composition ===
Smyrna town, Delaware – Racial and ethnic composition Note: the US Census treats Hispanic/Latino as an ethnic category. This table excludes Latinos from the racial categories and assigns them to a separate category. Hispanics/Latinos may be of any race.
Race / Ethnicity (NH = Non-Hispanic)	Pop 2000	Pop 2010	Pop 2020	% 2000	% 2010	% 2020
White alone (NH)	4,066	6,061	6,303	71.60%	60.47%	48.92%
Black or African American alone (NH)	1,256	2,860	4,494	22.12%	28.53%	34.88%
Native American or Alaska Native alone (NH)	27	24	37	0.48%	0.24%	0.29%
Asian alone (NH)	31	152	221	0.55%	1.52%	1.72%
Native Hawaiian or Pacific Islander alone (NH)	4	2	1	0.07%	0.02%	0.01%
Other race alone (NH)	8	28	97	0.14%	0.28%	0.75%
Mixed race or Multiracial (NH)	93	304	727	1.64%	3.03%	5.64%
Hispanic or Latino (any race)	194	592	1,003	3.42%	5.91%	7.79%
Total	5,679	10,023	12,883	100.00%	100.00%	100.00%

=== 2020 census ===
As of the 2020 census, Smyrna had a population of 12,883. The median age was 36.2 years. 26.0% of residents were under the age of 18 and 14.9% of residents were 65 years of age or older. For every 100 females there were 85.1 males, and for every 100 females age 18 and over there were 82.1 males age 18 and over.

99.0% of residents lived in urban areas, while 1.0% lived in rural areas.

There were 4,885 households in Smyrna, of which 38.0% had children under the age of 18 living in them. Of all households, 42.2% were married-couple households, 15.9% were households with a male householder and no spouse or partner present, and 33.9% were households with a female householder and no spouse or partner present. About 24.7% of all households were made up of individuals and 10.1% had someone living alone who was 65 years of age or older.

There were 5,179 housing units, of which 5.7% were vacant. The homeowner vacancy rate was 1.8% and the rental vacancy rate was 6.7%.

Racial composition as of the 2020 census
Race	Number	Percent
White	6,489	50.4%
Black or African American	4,624	35.9%
American Indian and Alaska Native	53	0.4%
Asian	226	1.8%
Native Hawaiian and Other Pacific Islander	3	0.0%
Some other race	400	3.1%
Two or more races	1,088	8.4%

=== 2000 census ===
As of the census of 2000, there were 5,679 people, 2,114 households, and 1,462 families residing in the town. The population density was 1,541.9 inhabitants per square mile (595.3/km^{2}). There were 2,242 housing units at an average density of 608.7 per square mile (235.0/km^{2}). The racial makeup of the town was 72.88% White, 22.42% African American, 0.51% Native American, 0.56% Asian, 0.07% Pacific Islander, 1.44% from other races, and 2.11% from two or more races. Hispanic or Latino of any race were 3.42% of the population.

There were 2,114 households, out of which 36.7% had children under the age of 18 living with them, 45.9% were married couples living together, 18.4% had a female householder with no husband present, and 30.8% were non-families. 24.9% of all households were made up of individuals, and 10.4% had someone living alone who was 65 years of age or older. The average household size was 2.56 and the average family size was 3.02.

In the town, the population was spread out, with 27.1% under the age of 18, 8.7% from 18 to 24, 29.1% from 25 to 44, 18.3% from 45 to 64, and 16.9% who were 65 years of age or older. The median age was 35 years. For every 100 females, there were 82.7 males. For every 100 females age 18 and over, there were 77.0 males.

The median income for a household in the town was $36,212, and the median income for a family was $42,355. Males had a median income of $32,500 versus $22,135 for females. The per capita income for the town was $17,443. About 7.9% of families and 10.5% of the population were below the poverty line, including 14.0% of those under age 18 and 6.2% of those age 65 or over.

== Government ==
Smyrna is governed by a mayor and a six-member council. As of 2025, the mayor of Smyrna is Tabitha Gott. The Smyrna Town Council consists of:

- Nelson Drew Jr (District 1)
- Corrine Upshur (Vice Mayor, District 2)
- Alvin Pope (Secretary, District 3)
- Dean Johnson (At-large)
- Ken Olson (At-large)
- Nick Miles (At-large)

== Infrastructure ==
=== Transportation ===
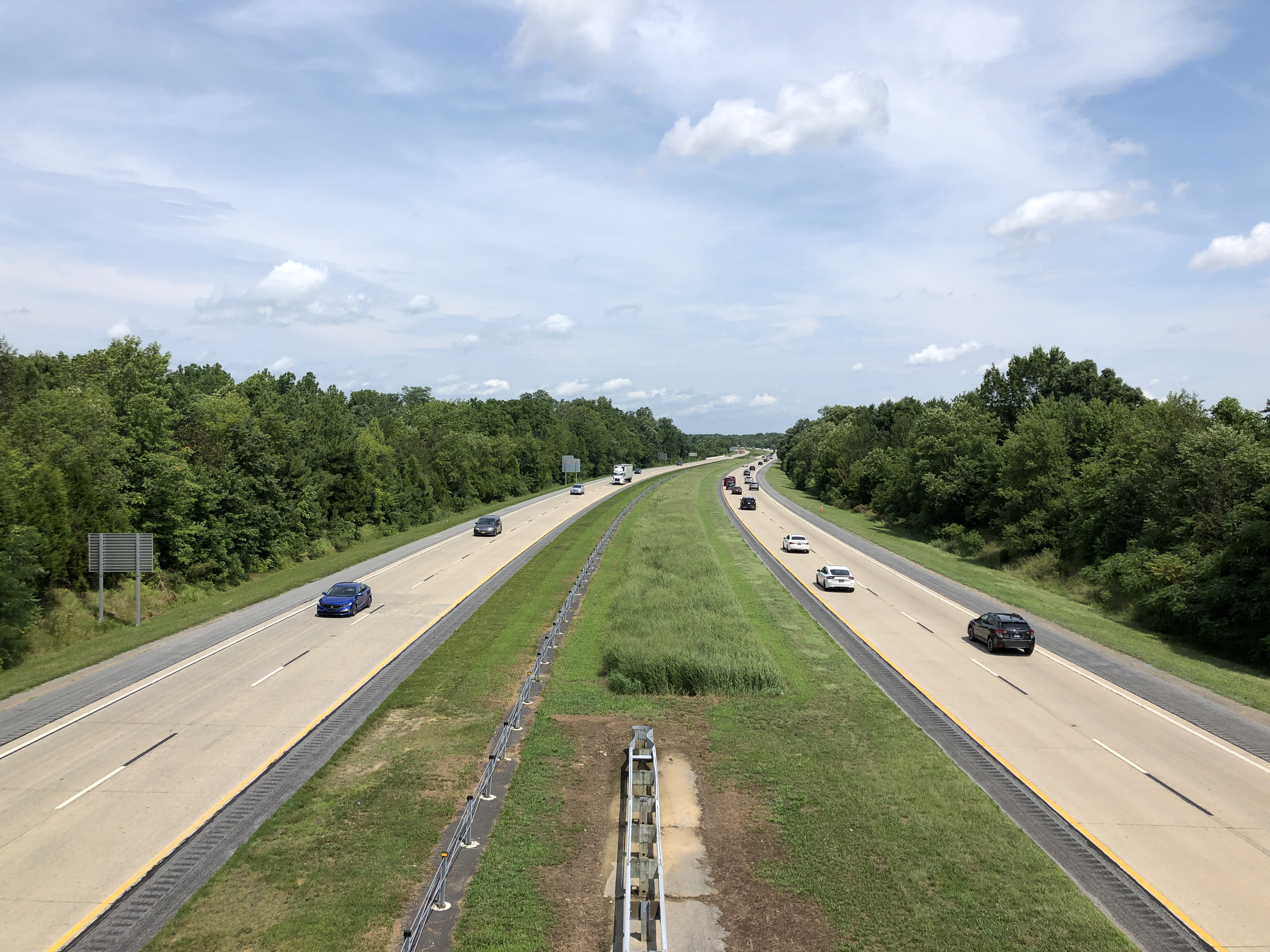
DE 1 northbound in Smyrna

The Delaware Route 1 toll road is the most prominent highway serving Smyrna. It passes along the eastern edge of the town, with access provided at Exit 114 (South Smyrna) and Exit 119 (North Smyrna), both connecting to US 13. U.S. Route 13 is the main north–south road through Smyrna, passing through the town on Dupont Boulevard. The Smyrna Rest Area is located north of Smyrna at the junction of US 13 and DE 1 at Exit 119. US 13 and DE 1 both run south to Dover and north to Wilmington. Delaware Route 6 runs east–west through Smyrna, heading west to Clayton and Blackiston and east to Woodland Beach. Delaware Route 300 begins at US 13 and heads west along with DE 6 through Smyrna before splitting to the southwest and heading toward Kenton. DART First State provides bus service to Smyrna along Route 120, which provides local service south to Dover and connects to the local bus routes serving the Dover area; Route 301, which provides express service south to Dover and north to Wilmington from the Smyrna Rest Area; and Route 302, which provides service south to Dover and north to Middletown from the Smyrna Rest Area. Smyrna Airport, a general aviation airport, is located to the east of Smyrna.

=== Utilities ===
The Town of Smyrna Electric Department provides electricity to Smyrna, serving about 6,200 customers. The town's electric department is a member of the Delaware Municipal Electric Corporation, a wholesale electric utility that purchases energy for its members. Trash collection in the town is provided under contract by Waste Industries. The Public Works department provides water and sewer service to about 4,000 customers in Smyrna. Natural gas service in Smyrna is provided by Chesapeake Utilities.

=== Health care ===
Bayhealth Medical Center operates the Bayhealth Emergency Center, Smyrna in Smyrna. The emergency center offers a 24-hour emergency department.

=== Corrections ===
The James T. Vaughn Correctional Center of the Delaware Department of Correction is located in an unincorporated area, and has a Smyrna post office address.

== Education ==
The school district is Smyrna School District. Its comprehensive high school is Smyrna High School.

== Notable people ==
- Jacob M. Appel (born 1973), author, wrote The Topless Widow of Herkimer Street while living in Smyrna
- Billy Bailey (1947–1996), convicted murderer, last person (as of July 2026) to be hanged in US (1996)
- Edward G. Budd, founder of the automotive, railroad and aviation manufacturing firm, The Budd Company, Philadelphia
- George D. Cummins, founder and first Bishop of the Reformed Episcopal Church
- Sug Daniels, singer-songwriter
- Carl E. Grammer (1858-1944), Evangelical Episcopal priest and author
- John Bassett Moore, international lawyer, 23rd Assistant United States Secretary of State
- Robert J. Reynolds, 47th Governor of Delaware
- Michael Scuse, acting United States Secretary of Agriculture
- Presley Spruance, United States Senator of Delaware 1847–1853
- Chuck Wicks, country music singer and Dancing with the Stars contestant
- John B. Mayberry, Congressional Medal of Honor Recipient for actions at the Battle Of Gettysburg
- John H. Hoffecker, United States Congressman for Delaware
- Walter O. Hoffecker United States Congressman for Delaware
- Levin I. Handy, United States Congressman for Delaware
- John Cook, sixth President of Delaware (1782–1783) [Some Governors were referred to as "Presidents" of their state prior to the ratification of the Constitution which established the U.S. Presidency]
- Thomas Collins, 8th President of Delaware (1786–1789) [Some Governors were referred to as "Presidents" of their state prior to the ratification of the Constitution which established the U.S. Presidency]
- John Clark, 20th Governor of Delaware
- William Temple, 35th Governor of Delaware (1846–1847) [Youngest Governor in Delaware's history at 32], United States Congressman for Delaware (1863–1863 died in office)
- Frances Van Gasken (1860–1939), physician and suffragist
- James Williams, United States Congressman for Delaware (1875–1879)
- Roosevelt Wardell, acclaimed jazz pianist who recorded with Sam Jones and Louis Hayes
