= Bannister Hall and Baynard House =

Historic houses in Delaware, United States

- U.S. National Register of Historic Places
- U.S. Historic district
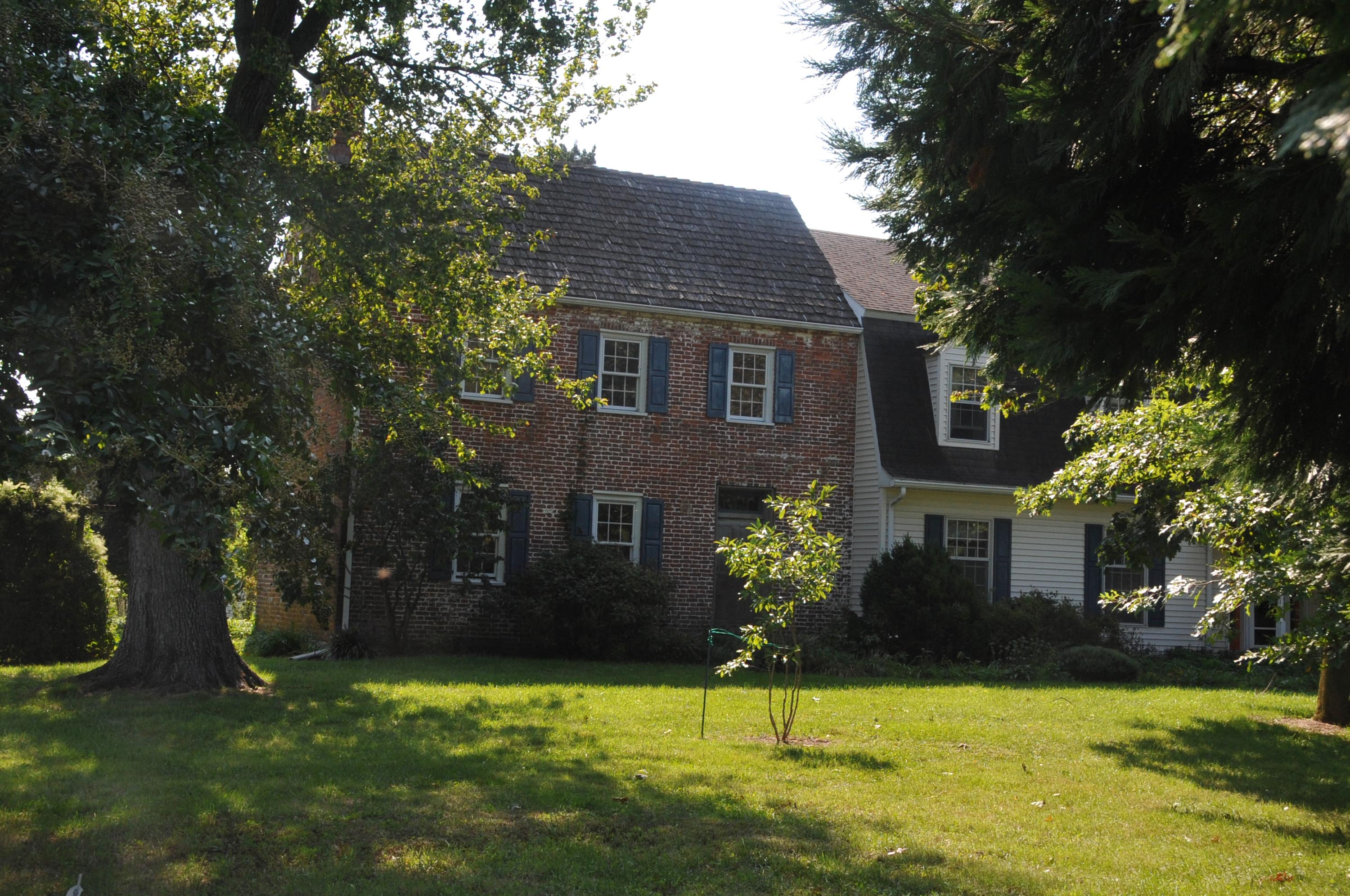
- Baynard House, September 2012

- Location within Delaware Location within the United States
- Location: South of Smyrna off Delaware Route 300, near Smyrna, Delaware
- Coordinates: 39°17′22″N 75°37′19″W
- Area: 10 acres (4.0 ha)
- Built: 1750
- Architect: Thomas Collins
- Architectural style: Resurrection Manor
- NRHP reference No.: 73000503
- Added to NRHP: April 11, 1973

Bannister Hall and Baynard House is a national historic district located near Smyrna, Kent County, Delaware. It includes structures dating from 1750. The property was listed on the National Register of Historic Places in 1973. The listing included two contributing buildings on 10 acres (4.0 ha).

Baynard House has also been named Fox Hall.

The cupola-topped Bannister Hall building "may have been the first pre-fabricated house erected in Delaware" although in appearance it is "typical of Delaware country mansions of the Victorian period."
