= Smyrna High School (Delaware) =

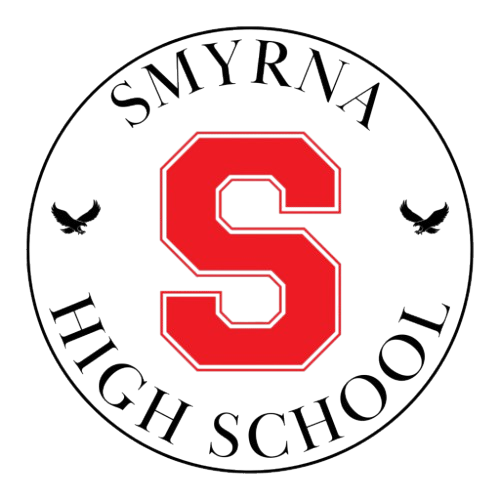
- Logo for Smyrna High School

Location
- 500 Duck Creek Parkway; Smyrna, Delaware 19977; United States; 39°18′00″N 75°37′41″W

Information
- School district: Smyrna School District
- Superintendent: Deborah Judy
- CEEB code: 080150
- Principal: Dainelle Hampton-Morton
- Staff: 97.00 (on an FTE basis)
- Grades: 9–12
- Enrollment: 1,496 (2016–17)
- Student to teacher ratio: 15.42
- Campus type: Rural
- Colors: Red and white
- Athletics conference: Henlopen Conference - Northern Division
- Mascot: Eagles
- Website: shs.smyrna.k12.de.us

Smyrna High School is a 9–12 public high school in Smyrna, Delaware.

== History ==
The school graduated its first class in 1894. Until the mid-1990s Smyrna was considered a farm community with a small rural school. The school was built in 1970 to accommodate 2,500 students, but the total student body was about 800 in 1976 - having about 250 graduating seniors. The town has experienced a wave of economic expansion since then. The school was accredited by the Middle States Association of Colleges and Schools in 1931.

The school moved to its current campus on Duck Creek Parkway in 1970 with the opening of the new Smyrna High School, having moved from the former John Bassett Moore High School on South Street. The campus underwent a $61 million renovation in 2006.

As of 2017, the Smyrna School District had doubled in population, and as a result Smyrna High School had become Delaware's eighth largest high school, with a greatly expanded academic curriculum and facilities. In 2017, the school started a program for students considering a career in education.

== Athletics ==
Smyrna High School competes in the Henlopen Conference of the Delaware Interscholastic Athletic Association (DIAA), with 42 teams in 23 sports.

The boys' school athletics program had historically been known mainly for its wrestling program, but Smyrna's population growth brought greater success in football and other sports.

Smyrna also partakes in the Harvest Bowl, a football contest between the Eagles and Middletown High School. The event was cancelled in 2001 and resumed in 2017.

=== State championships ===
- Softball: 1993, 2018
- Track and Field:
  - Boys Outdoor Division II: 1990, 1991
  - Girls Outdoor Division I: 2013
- Football: 2015, 2016, 2017, 2022
- Basketball (boys): 2017
- Dual Team Wrestling:
  - Division II: 1993, 1995, 1996, 2003, 2005
  - Division I: 2013, 2014, 2015, 2016
- Field Hockey: 2022

== Notable alumni ==
- Kevin Fleming (1971), photographer
- William Carson Jr. (1978), state representative
- Betnijah Laney-Hamilton (2011), WNBA All-Star
- Armani White (2014), rapper
- Nolan Henderson (2017), professional football quarterback
- Leddie Brown (2018), professional football running back
- Sal Wormley (2019), professional football offensive lineman
- Wayne Knight (2022), college football running back for the James Madison Dukes
