= Delaware and Chesapeake Railroad =

Former railroad in the US states of Maryland and Delaware

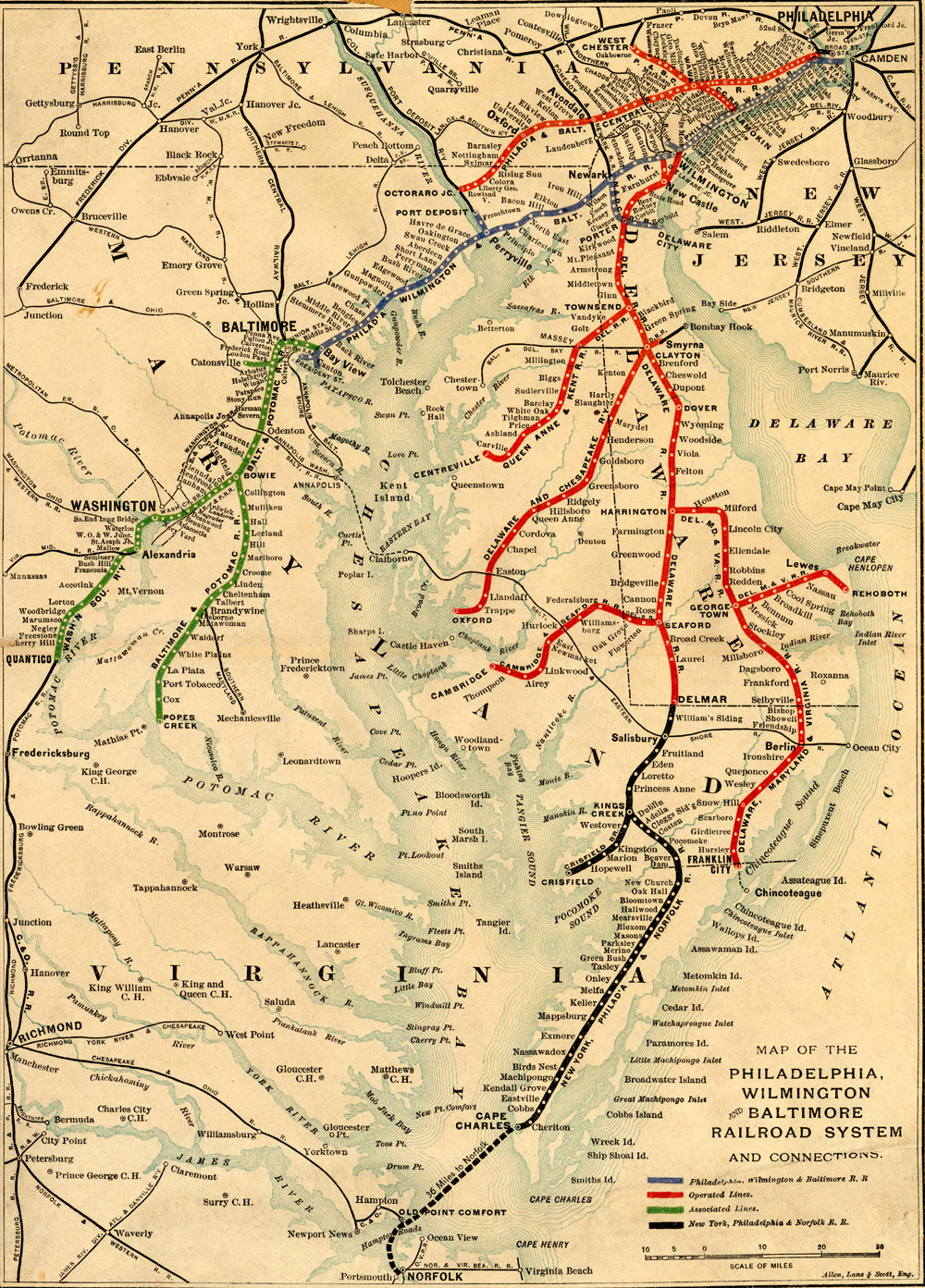
- An early 1890s map of the Philadelphia, Wilmington & Baltimore Railroad showing the Delaware and Chesapeake Railroad line

Overview
- Stations called at: Clayton, Kenton, Hartly, Slaughter, Marydel, Henderson, Goldsboro, Greensboro, Ridgely, Hillsboro, Queen Anne, Cordova, Chapel, Easton, Llandaff, Trappe, Oxford
- Headquarters: Easton, Maryland
- Locale: Talbot County, Maryland,Caroline County, Maryland,Kent County, Delaware
- Dates of operation: 1878–1912
- Predecessor: Maryland and Delaware Rail Road Company
- Successor: Delaware Railroad; Pennsylvania Railroad; Penn Central Railroad; Maryland and Delaware Railroad; Chesapeake Railroad

Technical
- Track gauge: 4 ft 8 1/2 in (1,435 mm) standard gauge
- Length: 53.75 miles (86.50 kilometres)

The Delaware and Chesapeake Railroad (DCRR) (Sometimes "Railway") was a railroad that ran between Clayton, Delaware and Oxford, Maryland in the late 19th Century and early 20th Century. It was chartered in 1869 to build a new train line across Delaware but used in 1878 as a way to organize a successor to the Maryland and Delaware Rail Road Company (M&D) which had been foreclosed on in late 1877.

The line, sometimes called the Oxford Branch, continued to operate, at least in part, under an assortment of owners and operators until 1996 when the last train ran. The state of Maryland, which purchased it in 1977, abandoned it in 2006 and railbanked it. Since then, localities have built several small trails on it and more have been proposed.

== History ==
The D&CR was chartered by the state of Delaware in 1869 to build a railroad from Port Penn, Delaware on the Delaware River to the Maryland state line near Warwick, Maryland, passing through Odessa and Middletown and crossing the Delaware Railroad (DRC) where necessary, but the bondholders never built any rail along that route. Instead the charter and name were used to reorganize the M&D railroad in 1878.

Between 1854 and 1871, the M&D built a line from Clayton, where it connected to the Delaware Railroad (DRC), to Oxford, Maryland. The Philadelphia, Wilmington and Baltimore Railroad (PW&B) operated the line. The M&D struggled to pay its debts and in 1877, bondholders foreclosed on the M&D. It was sold in two lots on December 20 of that year and reorganized as the D&CR on July 31, 1878.

In 1881, the Pennsylvania Railroad (PRR), which was at the time the nation's largest railroad, purchased the PW&B and in 1882 the PW&B purchased the DCR. The following year the two were consolidated by law.

In 1890, the Baltimore & Eastern Shore Railroad built a line that crossed and connected with the D&CR at Easton, MD. In 1896, the Queen Anne's Railroad crossed and connected to the line at Queen Anne, MD.

On January 23, 1899, D&CR was one of several Eastern Shore railroads that were merged into the DRC under agreement of December 31, 1898. It remained a separate entity with its own office in Easton, MD.

In 1902, the PW&B merged with the Baltimore and Potomac to form the Philadelphia, Baltimore and Washington Railroad (PB&W) and leased the DRC's trackage as part of the PB&W's Delaware Division. The lease was extended for 99 years in 1910. The following year, the DRC paid off all bonds of the D&CR and the railroad ceased to exist as a separate entity.

== Legacy ==
The Oxford Branch passed with the rest of the PW&B to the Pennsylvania Railroad in 1918. Passenger service ended in 1949. Service between Oxford and Easton ended in 1957 and that section of the line was abandoned in 1959. In 1968 the line transferred to Penn Central. Following the 1970 bankruptcy of Penn central it became part of Conrail in 1976, as the "Oxford Secondary Track" and service on the old Queen Anne line to Queenstown was terminated. The Maryland Department of Transportation took ownership of it in 1977 and the Maryland and Delaware Railroad ran trains on it, and the Denton Branch from Queen Anne to Denton, until 1983 when the MDDE discontinued service on both. In the 1990's the Chesapeake Railroad tried to revive service but it ceased operations in 1996, running one last train to remove equipment in 1998.

=== Right-of-way ===
Maryland still owns the inactive Oxford Branch and both Maryland and Delaware have been trying to turn it into a rail trail since 2005. It was railbanked in 2013 and the long-term plan is to turn the whole route into a rail trail. Several pieces have been turned into short trails already and other trails are in advanced planning, including the 15 miles in Talbot County. In 2006, DelDOT studied the State of Delaware’s section of the Oxford Branch and recommended it for further evaluation and prioritization for Capital Improvement Programs within the Statewide Long-Range Transportation Plan and in 2025 it was given further evaluation as part of the Clayton-to-Marydel Rail Trail Study.

Along the right-of-way, disused tracks, bridges, overpasses, mileposts and embankments still remain. The overpasses at Tappers Corner Road and Old Queen Anne's Highway, as well as bridges over Oldtown Branch, Forge Branch (Ford and Jarrel Branch), Peachblossom Creek and Trippe Creek are among the remnants.

The portion of the right-of-way through Easton, including the bridge over North Fork Tanyard Branch, was converted to a rail trail in 1998.

Approximately 2000 feet of the right-of-way in Ridgely, MD was turned into a rail trail in 2009.

In 2010, the bridge over Queen Anne Highway was removed.

Around 2019, the railroad bridge over Tuckahoe Creek in Queen Anne, MD and a short section of the railroad ROW in Tuckahoe State Park were turned into a potion of Anna's Trail and also serves as part of the American Discovery Trail.

In 2024 a group called "Talbot Thrive" proposed turning the ROW from Oxford to Easton into the Oyster Trail and the section from Easton to Tuckahoe State Park into the Frederick Douglass Rail Trail.

In Spring 2025, MDOT launched a project to design a 10-mile section of the proposed Frederick Douglass Rail-Trail, on the MDDE right-of-way, between Tuckahoe State Park and Black Dog Alley near Easton, MD.

=== Stations ===
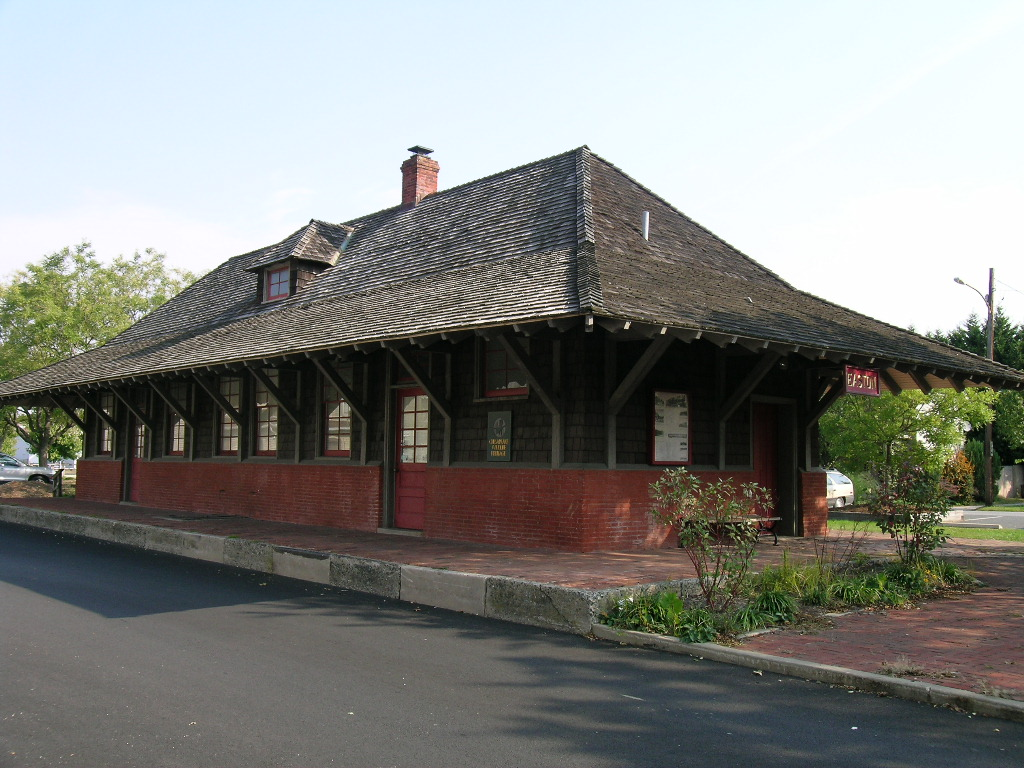
Easton's train station

The Ridgely, MD train station, which was built in 1892, was preserved in 2013 and now serves as a museum. It closed to passenger service in 1949 but continued to be used for freight until 1976. It was then used by several businesses, and even served as town hall in the 1990s.

The Clayton Railroad station, though built for the Delaware Railroad line, served as one terminal for the D&CR and it still remains in Clayton.
