= Queen Anne's Railroad =

Former railroad in Maryland and Delaware, US

Map

The Queen Anne's Railroad was a railroad that ran between Love Point, Maryland, and Lewes, Delaware during the late 19th and early 20th century. It connected to Baltimore via ferry across the Chesapeake Bay, to Cape May, New Jersey via a ferry across the Delaware Bay and to Rehoboth Beach, Delaware via another railroad. It was the last major railway built on Maryland's Eastern Shore. The rail line changed owners several times during its history. In the 20th century, the railway struggled to compete with the automobile and service was cutback. Over time, sections of the railroad were abandoned.

The section from Ellendale, DE to Milton, DE is the only portion still in use. It is owned by the state of Delaware and operated by the Maryland and Delaware Railroad. The rest of the line is in some state of non-use, abandonment, removal or trail conversion.

The company also owned and operated the Queen Anne's Ferry & Equipment Company which consisted of the steamers Endeavor, Queen Anne and Queen Caroline.

== Towns served ==
The following towns were served by the Queen Anne's Railroad:

- Love Point, Maryland
- Stevensville, Maryland
- Chester, Maryland
- Queenstown, Maryland
- Centreville, Maryland (via the Centreville Branch)
- Queen Anne, Maryland
- Denton, Maryland
- Hickman, Delaware
- Adamsville, Delaware
- Greenwood, Delaware
- Owens, Delaware
- Ellendale, Delaware
- Milton, Delaware
- Lewes, Delaware

An article appearing in the April 9, 1897 issue of The Morning News announcing the opening of the new railway lists the stations, in order, as Queenstown, Bloomingdale, Wye Mills, Willoughby, Queen Anne, Hillsboro, Downes, Tuckahoe, Denton, Hobbs, Hickman, Adamsville, Blanchard, and Greenwood where the line terminated while construction continued to Ellendale.

== History ==
The Queen Anne's Railroad company was incorporated by a group of Centreville businessmen in Maryland on February 26, 1894, to provide transportation between Baltimore and Cape May, NJ. It received legislative authorization from Delaware to build its line to Lewes, DE in February 1895 despite opposition from the Pennsylvania Railroad (PRR) which had its own Cape May service. The goal of the railroad was to create a link from Baltimore to Centreville and the Atlantic Coast.

Construction began on June 27, 1895. It began operating between Queenstown, MD and Denton, MD, with a crossing of the Delaware and Chesapeake Railroad at Queen Anne, on July 15, 1896. It was extended east to Greenwood, DE - where it connected to the Delaware Railroad - on January 1, 1897. It was extended further east to Milton, DE by August 29 of that year. On March 1, 1898, service was extended to Lewes, DE where it connected to a terminal that allowed passengers to catch a ferry to Cape May. At Lewes it also connected to the resort of Rehoboth via a line owned by the Philadelphia, Baltimore and Washington Railroad.

In 1899, the Queen Anne's Railroad converted a building in Rehoboth Beach at the corner of Rehoboth Avenue and Surf Avenue (now the corner of Rehoboth Avenue and the Rehoboth Beach boardwalk) "into an elaborate welcome center for the resort visitors who used the Queen Anne's trains." This welcome center included 100 bathhouses, a 40 foot by 40 foot dance floor, bowling alley, shuffleboard, electric lights, and accommodations for 1,000 excursionists and was located one block from the Delaware, Maryland, and Virginia railroad station in Rehoboth Beach that was utilized by the Queen Anne railroad after the rail lines linked in Lewes. The Queen Anne Railroad planned to construct their own rail line from Lewes to Rehoboth Beach that would have followed the beach, giving a view of the ocean and passing just beside the Great Dune at the Cape Henlopen Light, at the present day Cape Henlopen State Park,; but the line was never built.

In 1901–02, the rail line was extended 13-mile (21 km) west to Love Point, Maryland and north from Queenstown to Centreville. At Love Point it connected to a ferry line, shortening the ferry trip to Baltimore.

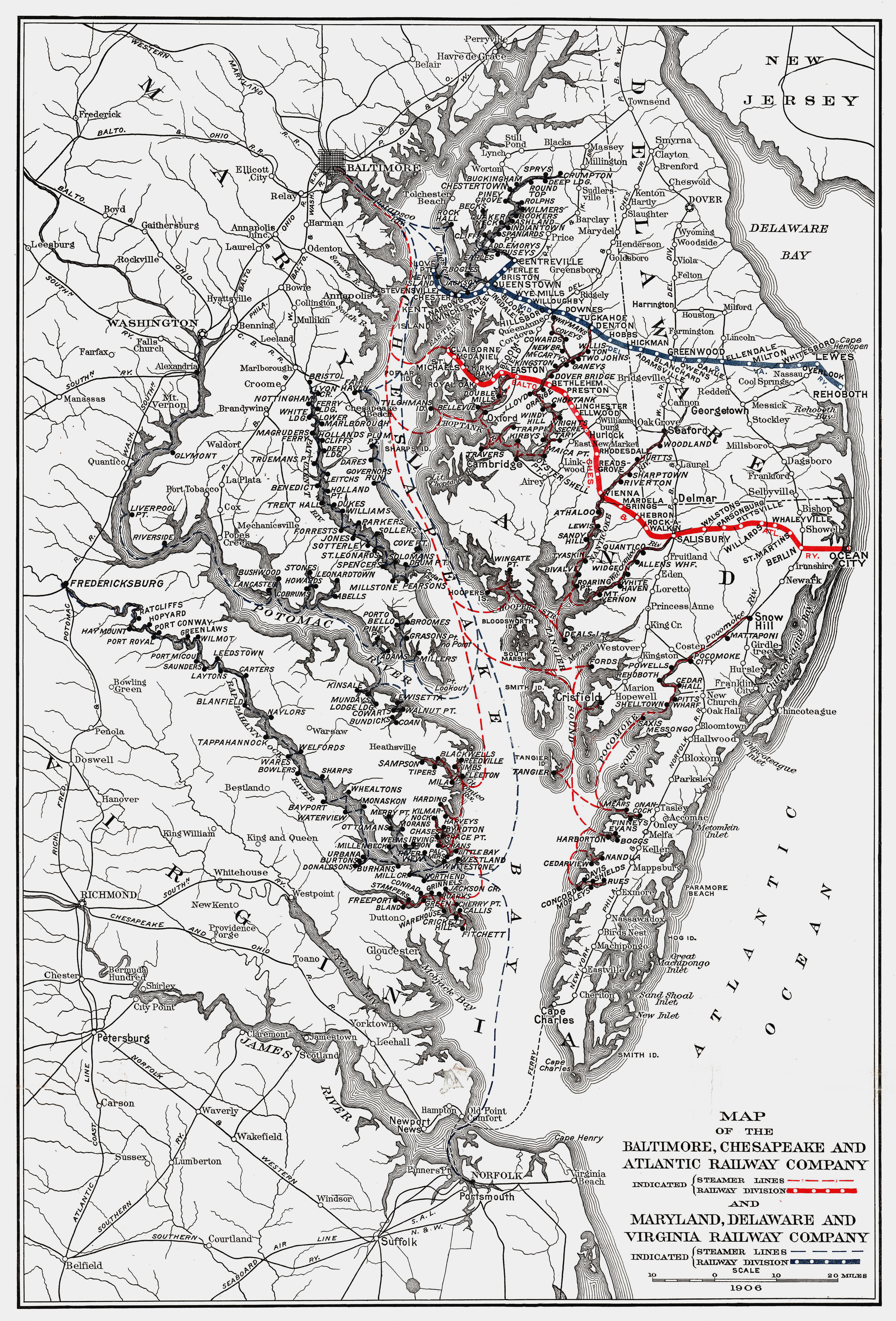
The former path of the railroad is marked in blue on the 1906 map above

. The railroad began operating a summer-only Cape May Express train between Queenstown and Lewes with a connecting steamer across the Delaware Bay to Cape May, New Jersey.

The railroad was not as successful as investors hoped and it went bankrupt in 1904.

=== Maryland, Delaware and Virginia Railway Company ===
Through a complex series of acquisitions, Queen Anne's Railroad ceased to exist and its assets became the property of the Maryland, Delaware and Virginia Railway Company (MD&V), a subsidiary of the Pennsylvania Railroad created for the purpose of acquiring the QAR, on January 28, 1905. Two days later it was placed under the control of the Baltimore, Chesapeake and Atlantic Railway (BC&A) and the two were operated as twins. The "Virginia" in the railroad's name likely referred to the line's steamer routes which operated in Virginia waters.

The MD&V lost money every single year except for 1910 and 1911. As a result, the PRR sold it and all of its properties in May 1923 to the E. B. Leaf Company. In 1924 Leaf sold the western portion, from Love Point to West Denton, MD, to the Baltimore and Eastern Railroad (B&ER) a subsidiary of the BC&A. It sold the eastern portion, from West Denton to Lewes, to the Maryland and Delaware Coast Railroad at the same time.

=== Love Point to Denton ===
==== Baltimore and Eastern Railroad ====
In 1928 the BC&A was merged into the B&ER. Passenger service was terminated in 1931 and replaced by bus service and sections of the railroad were abandoned throughout the intervening years.

In 1934, the B&ER purchased the small section from West Denton to Denton from the failed Maryland and Delaware Coast Railway, by then operating under the name of Maryland and Delaware Seacoast Railway.

The bus that started in the 1931 was gone from the schedule by 1941, as the company dropped all passenger operations.

The opening of the Chesapeake Bay Bridge in 1952 dealt the B&ER a further blow as more travelers chose to drive.

==== Conrail ====
Conrail took control of the B&ER rail corridor on April 1, 1976. The section from Queenstown, MD to Queen Anne, MD, which only served a single customer, was taken out of service as too costly to subsidize.

==== Maryland and Delaware Railroad ====
In 1977, the Maryland and Delaware Railroad (MDDE) was formed to operate rural lines that were omitted from Conrail's system plan and it began to operate trains between Queen Anne, where it connected to the Oxford Branch and Denton, hauling freight and running occasional excursions.

The Denton and Oxford Branches operated at a loss for years, with declining use and in 1982 it was estimated that they needed $1 million in repairs. Freight operations ended on February 22, 1983, and the Maryland Department of Transportation abandoned the lines that same year.

==== Chesapeake Railroad ====
In the mid-80's the Chesapeake Railroad (CHRR) was formed to resume service with excursion and dinner trains and some freight between Clayton and Queen Anne and from Queen Anne to Denton. They signed an agreement with MTA to do so in 1993, received permission from the ICC the next year and started running both freight and excursion trains in 1995.

The railroad struggled and never used the Denton Branch. In 1998 the state terminated the CHRR's operating agreement and a few days later a final run was made to clear equipment from the track.

18.75 miles of the right-of-way and trackage from Wye Mill, MD to Denton is still owned by the state of Maryland.

=== Denton to Lewes ===
==== Maryland and Delaware Coast ====
The Maryland and Delaware Coast Railroad (M&DCR) was a locally organized railroad created to preserve passenger rail on the West Denton to Lewes branch on April 16, 1924. In 1931 their "gasoline car" was destroyed and they ended passenger rail; freight service continued, but they went bankrupt and were foreclosed on in 1932.

==== Maryland & Delaware Seacoast Railway ====
It was then reorganized as the Maryland & Delaware Seacoast Railway, but it did no better than the M&DCR and by 1934 it had filed for abandonment. At that point, the railroad was taken over by the PRR and cut into pieces. The line from West Denton across the river to Denton, which was the source of ~2/3rds of the freight at the time, wound up with the Baltimore & Eastern. The Ellendale to Milton section, known now as the Milton Industrial Track, was sold to the Delaware, Maryland & Virginia Railroad, a PRR subsidiary. The sections from Denton to Ellendale and from Milton to Lewes were abandoned.

==== PRR/Penn Central ====
The Milton Industrial Track remained part of the PRR until it became part of Penn Central in 1968 and stayed with Penn Central through their bankruptcy and the Conrail merger; but it was omitted from the system plan for Conrail. As a result of the bankruptcy, the Milton Industrial Track was sold to DelDOT.

==== DelDOT ====
Once DelDot became owners of the Milton Industrial Track, they licensed the Delaware Coast Line Railroad (DCLR) to operate freight traffic on it to serve the Draper-King Cole Cannery located just east of Chestnut St in Milton. In 1994 the Delaware Transit Corporation (DTC) was formed and took control of the line. At that time the MDDE was awarded a five-year contract to operate the line. After Draper went out of business in 1999, Norfolk Southern leased the line to store grain cars on it for Purdue and operations returned to DCLR. DCLR restarted operations on the Milton Industrial Track in 2010 for use by a propane facility on the west side of Milton but the portion of track between Gravel Hill Road/MD-30 and downtown Milton was abandoned. In early 2018, DelDOT decided not to renew its contract with DCLR and the Delmarva Central Railroad won the bid to take it over effective January 1, 2019.

In the 1990s, a dinner train operated on the original trackage of Junction and Breakwater Railroad between Lewes and Nassau, Delaware with locomotives and passenger cars branded as the "Queen Anne's Railroad," but it had no direct links to the original 1894-1905 railroad.

Delaware's 2006 Rail-to-Trail and Rail with Trail Facility Master Plan included a recommendation that the Milton Industrial Track be evaluated for a rail trail, but that was prior to use being restarted in 2010. The Milton-Lewes Line was not studied but the report notes broad opposition to its conversion, further noting that ownership of the rail corridor is unknown and appears to have reverted to private ownership in some cases.

The section from Ellendale to MD-30 is the only portion of the original Queen Anne Railroad still in use.

== Remnants ==
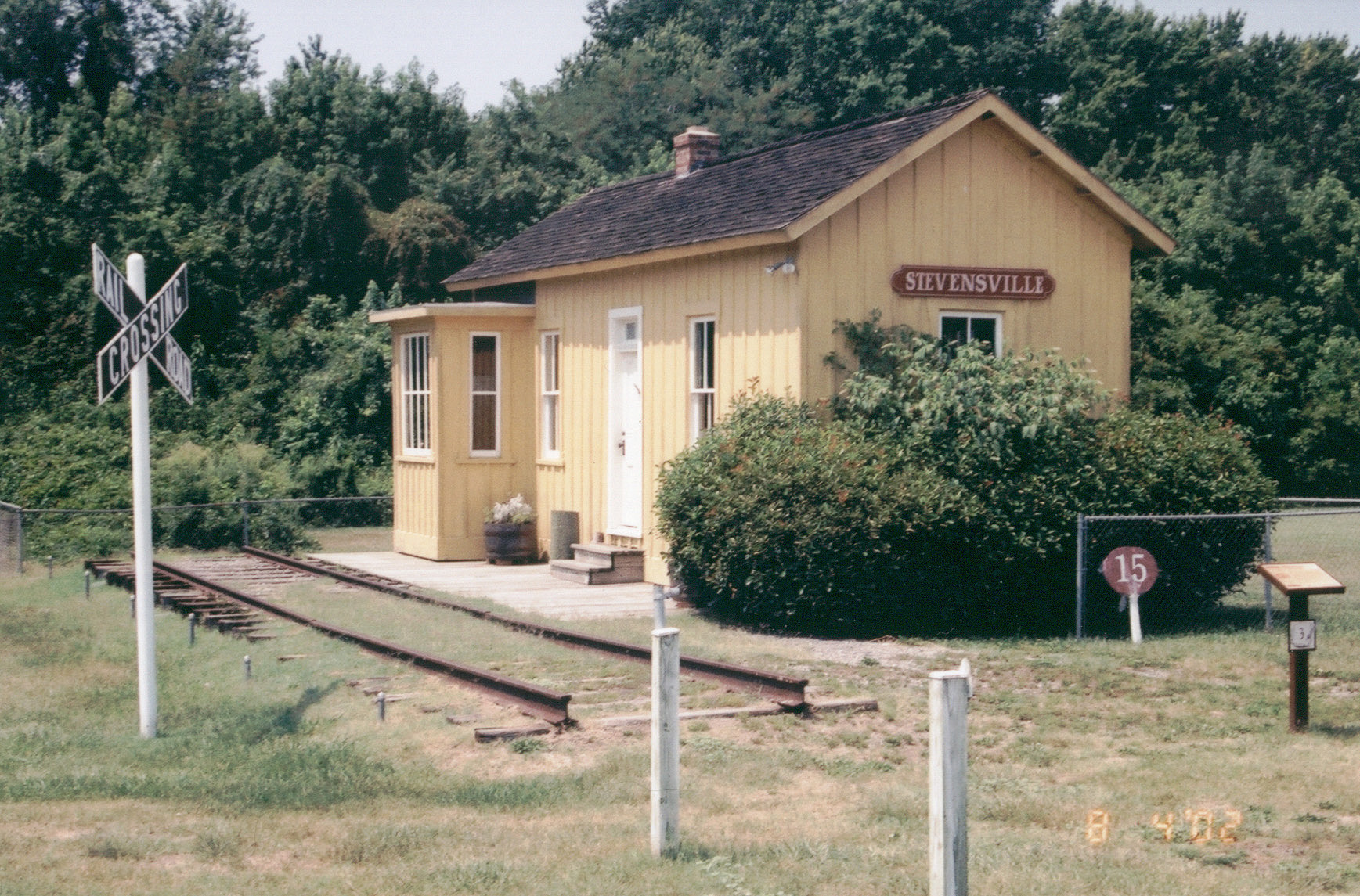
The Stevensville Train Depot as it exists today

In Queen Anne's County, Maryland, the railroad right-of-way from Stevensville to Chester has been turned into part of the Cross Island Trail, a rail trail which is, in turn, part of the American Discovery Trail.

The Stevensville Train Depot remains in Historic Stevensville, MD and serves as a museum.

The railroad still legally exists between Queenstown and Queen Anne's but that track has mostly been removed. There is still a trestle over the Wye East River.

Between Queen Anne and Denton the railroad is owned by MDOT, but much of the rail has been removed. For a time in the 1990s this section was operated by the Cheseapeake Railroad. This section includes extant railroad bridges over Tuckahoe Creek and the Choptank River. The Choptank River bridge was once operated by a hand-cranked turnstile. The bridge was rotated 90 degrees and vessels could pass to either side of the central island, which supported the turnstile bridge.

Between Denton and Ellendale the railroad has been abandoned as has the section between Milton and Lewes.

The original railroad station in Sudlersville is still in existence and serves as a museum.

A 700-foot section of the rail right-of-way in Milton, DE was converted into the Milton Rail Trail in 2009 and extended west by 1600 feet, including a trestle over Ingram Branch, in June 2020.

On the west side of Milton another trestle, over Pemberton Branch, is also extent.

A Delaware state historical marker in Milton and another in Ellendale's historic Railroad Square district commemorate the railroad.

The Baltimore, Chesapeake & Atlantic Railway was operating the last three D16 4-4-0 steam locomotives in 1937 when they were scheduled to be scrapped. A PRR officer noticed thus and ordered that #1223 be renovated to almost original condition. It was displayed at a number of railroad fairs in the 1930s-1950s and retired from revenue service in 1950. After being stored at a roundhouse in Northumberland, Pennsylvania for years, it was used to run excursion trains on the Strasburg Rail Road outside of Strasburg, Pennsylvania starting in 1965. In 1989 it was removed from service and put on static display at the Railroad Museum of Pennsylvania outside of Strasburg. It was listed on the National Register of Historic Places in 1979. No. 1223 is the only surviving example of the Pennsylvania Railroad's D16sb class.

Other parts of the right of way have been turned into Love Point Road, US-50, other roads and utility corridors; and several culverts remain.
