= Maryland and Delaware Rail Road Company =

Former railroad in the US states of Maryland and Delaware

Maryland and Delaware Rail Road
Overview
- Locale: Maryland,Delaware
- Dates of operation: 1854–1877
- Successor: Delaware and Chesapeake Railroad; Delaware Railroad; Pennsylvania Railroad; Penn Central Railroad; Maryland and Delaware Railroad; Chesapeake Railroad

Technical
- Track gauge: 4 ft 8 1/2 in (1,435 mm) standard gauge
- Length: 53.5 miles (86.1 kilometres)

The Maryland and Delaware Rail Road (M&D) was a railroad that ran between Clayton, Delaware and Oxford, Maryland in the second half of the 19th Century. It was chartered in 1854, began construction in 1857, started operation in 1868 and in 1877 reorganized as the Delaware and Chesapeake Railroad.

The line it built, sometimes called the Oxford Branch continued to operate, at least in part, under an assortment of owners and operators until 1996 when the last train ran. The state of Maryland, which purchased it in 1977, abandoned it in 2006 and railbanked it. Since then, localities have built several small trails on it and more have been proposed.

== History ==
The M&D was chartered in Maryland in 1854 and in Delaware in 1857 to build a railroad from Talbot County, Maryland to a point on the Delaware Railroad (DCR) at Smyrna Station (later Clayton). The DCR was in the process of designing and building a line from Dover through Clayton to Seaford. Work on the Delaware Railroad line began in 1856, and the Philadelphia, Wilmington and Baltimore Railroad (PB&W) took over and began to operate the line on January 1, 1857.

Work on the M&D line began on December 27, 1857, less than a year after the DCR opened but was not completed until 1871. The line was graded and bridged as far as Greensboro, Maryland by 1859. Work was interrupted by the Civil War and finally resumed in October 1865. By 1868 trains were running to Ridgely and by 1869 to Hillsborough. The first trains reached Easton on August 14, 1869 and the first freight train left there on August 31. Daily passenger traffic didn't begin until November 15, 1869. As late as 1870 the railroad was still trying to decide between Oxford and Chancellor Point on the north side of the Choptank River as the terminus, but settled on Oxford which it reached in the summer of 1871.

After the line was completed, there were two trains a day; a passenger train and one freight train with a passenger car attached.

In 1877, bondholders foreclosed on the railroad, it was sold on December 20 of that year and later reorganized as the Delaware and Chesapeake Railroad Company (DCRC).

== Remnants ==
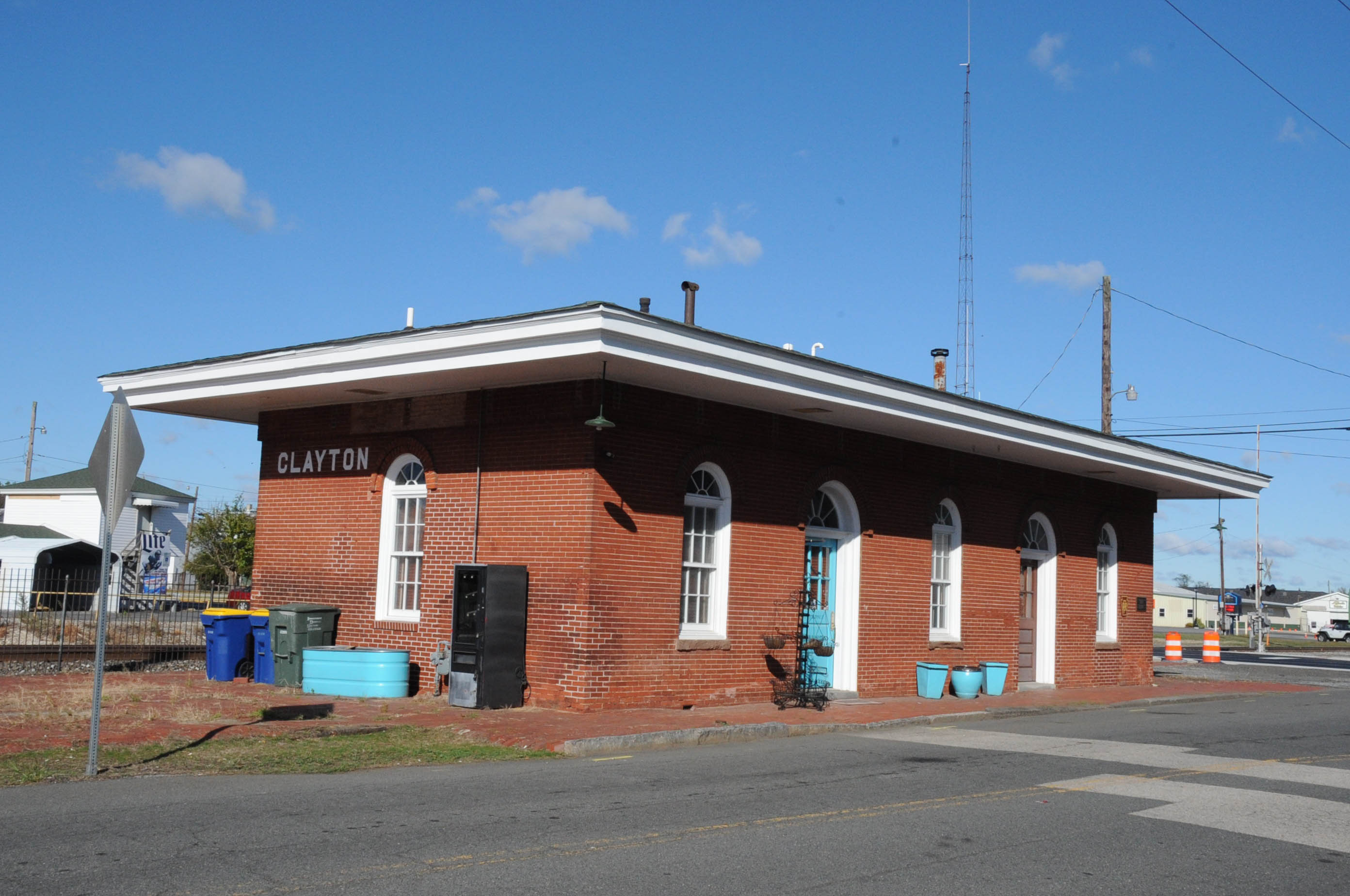
Clayton Railroad Station in 2017

Along the right-of-way, disused tracks, bridges, overpasses, mileposts and embankments still remain. The overpasses at Tappers Corner Road and Old Queen Anne's Highway, as well as bridges over Oldtown Branch, Forge Branch (Ford and Jarrel Branch), Peachblossom Creek and Trippe Creek are among the remnants.

In addition, the former railyard in Clayton is now a BioDiesel plant and it retained about 2000 feet of track to serve as a siding.

The rail line between Easton and Clayton was railbanked in 2013 and several sections have been turned into trails, with more planned or proposed, including along the section between Easton and Oxford.

In addition several stations still remain.

- The old Clayton Station, built in 1855, still stands a short distance from the junction where it is used as event space.
- The Marydel Train station was moved out of town and allowed to fall into such disrepair that the town was unable to bring it back in 2006.
- The Trappe Railroad Station (at times called Oxford) still exists in Oxford at the corner of Oxford Road and Almshouse Road and is used as a real estate company's office. The prior house used as the ticket station is also extent, just across the street.
