= Partnership (disambiguation) =

A partnership is a business arrangement in which parties cooperate.

Partnership may also refer to:

- Intimate relationship, a romantic or sexual partnership
- Partnership (Fulton, Maryland), a historic building in Howard County
- Partnership (cards), players who play jointly and win or lose together
- Partnership (cricket), a part of an innings when the same pair bat
- Partnership government, a coalition
- Partnership Assurance, a British provider of non-standard annuities
- Partnership House, historically The Tower, an office building in Gosforth, UK

== See also ==
- Partner (disambiguation)
