= Oxford Branch =

Oxford Branch refers to the following railway lines:

- Oxford Branch (New Zealand)
- Oxford Branch (Pennsylvania Railroad) in Delaware and Maryland, United States
