= Maple Lawn, Fulton, Maryland =

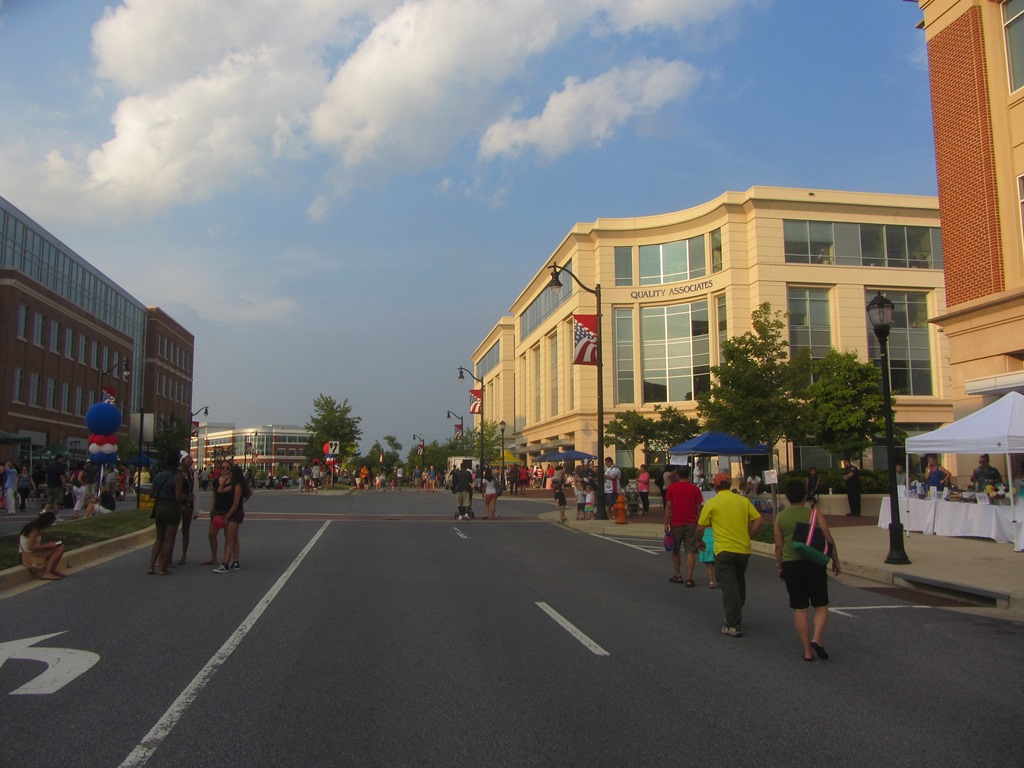

- Flag Logo

- Location within Maryland Location within the United States
- Coordinates: 39°09′19″N 76°54′31″W
- Country: United States
- State: Maryland
- City: Fulton

Maple Lawn is a land development in Fulton, Maryland, United States.

== History ==
In 1839, Heinrich Iager purchased 108 acres (44 ha) of farmland expanding to 185 acres (75 ha) forming Maple Lawn Farms. In 1938, the farm began its current free-range turkey operations under the "Sho-Nuf" brand name. In 1970, the farm owned by C. Ellsworth Iager and Sons won the Progressive Breeders Dairy Award. The farm was nationally recognized in 2004 for the registered Holsteins used in its dairy operations.

Ellsworth Iager (1916–1987) took advantage of cheap POW labor through 1945. In 1986, the Iagers took a higher land-lease option from J.J.M Inc. developers. The fencing was torn down and the neighboring Hines farm tenants were forced to liquidate their livestock due to the sudden reduction of grazing land. On July 17, 1987, farm owner, land developer, appraiser, and relator, Ellsworth Iager died. His son Charles took over the farm.

In the late 1990s, Fulton sat between the heavily developed areas of eastern Howard County, with water and sewer service, and the preserved western areas which used well water. Developer Greenebaum & Rose Associates proposed a dense 1,168-unit mixed-use project for a portion of the 506-acre (205 ha) farm. In January 1998, Councilman Darrell Drown felt that the zoning would take only a night or two and accommodated the developer with expedited hearings. The first phase of zoning faced multiple contentious votes and 32 record-length hearings between pro-development and rural supporters.

In 2013, the Howard County Department of Planning and Zoning sought to expand water and sewer service so that the remaining Maple Lawn property could be developed at maximum density. A 7,000-person referendum attempt was launched and suppressed by the landowners' attorney, William Erskine, who sits on the economic development agency as well as the same law firm as County Executive Ken Ulman's father. In September 2014, The Iager family hosted Ken Ulman on the remaining undeveloped Maple Lawn Farm parcel to become "Farmer for a Day".

A homeowners association is responsible for residential facilities and maintenance and upkeep of the community center and parkland. The commercial development is managed by the Maple Lawn Commercial Owners Association.

== Transportation ==
Howard County's rush-hour-only extension of Montgomery County's Flash BRT bus system to Maple Lawn began service on Sept. 8, 2026.

== See also ==
- Montpelier Mansion (Fulton, Maryland)
- Waters-Fulton Store and Post Office
