= Scaggsville, Maryland =

- Census-designated place
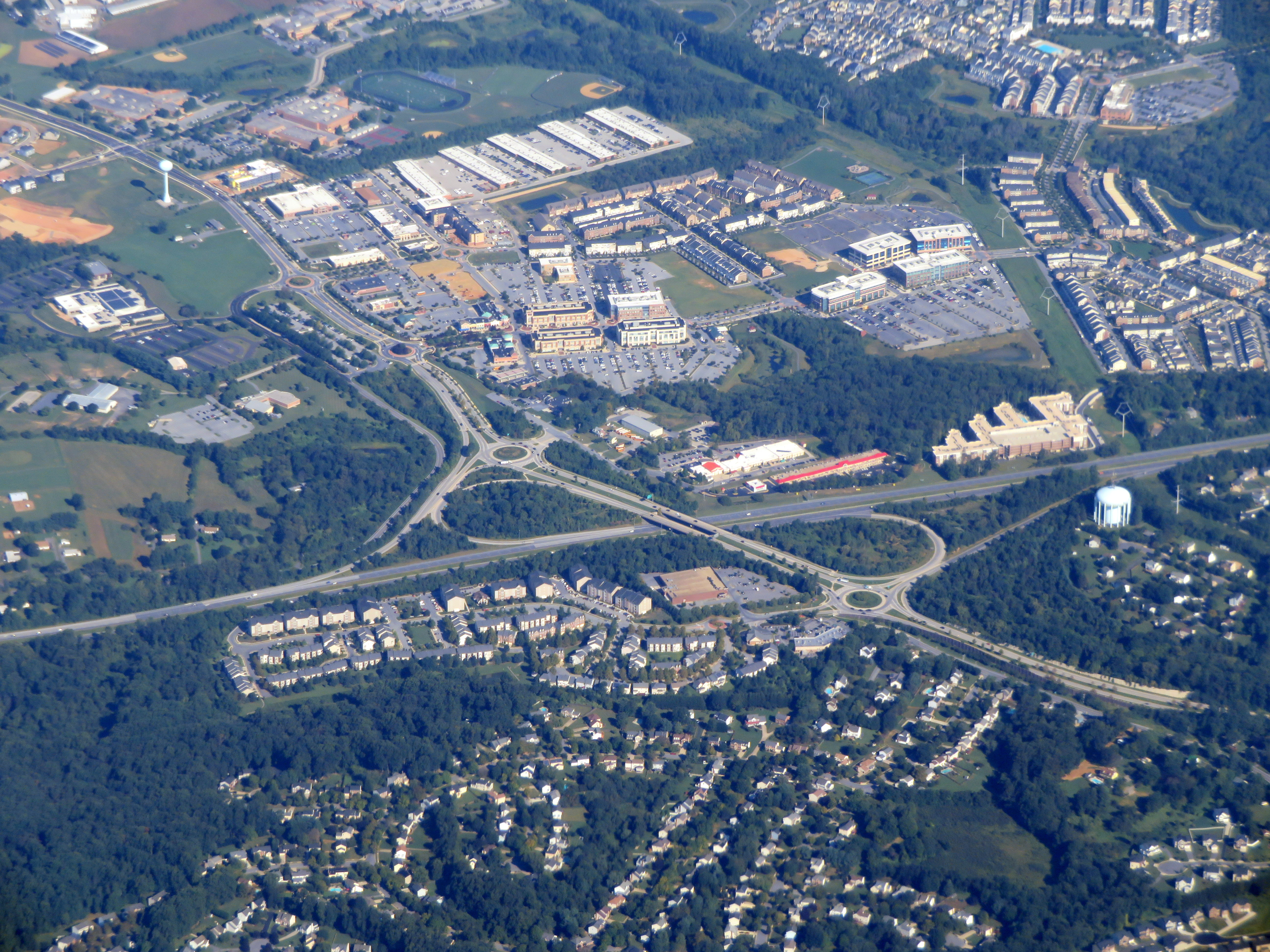
- Aerial view of the US 29/MD 216 interchange in September 2018

- Location within Maryland Location within the United States
- Coordinates: 39°8′33″N 76°53′24″W
- Country: United States
- State: Maryland
- County: Howard

Area
  - Total: 5.39 sq mi (13.95 km^{2})
  - Land: 5.03 sq mi (13.04 km^{2})
  - Water: 0.35 sq mi (0.91 km^{2})
- Elevation: 367 ft (112 m)

Population (2020)
  - Total: 9,217
  - Density: 1,830.5/sq mi (706.76/km^{2})
- Time zone: UTC−5 (EST)
  - Summer (DST): UTC−4 (EDT)
- ZIP code: 20723
- Area codes: 240, 301
- FIPS code: 24-70525
- GNIS feature ID: 2583685

Scaggsville is an unincorporated community and census-designated place in Howard County, Maryland, United States. It is situated near the southeastern tip of Howard County, between Laurel and Fulton. The town mainly consists of residences, with some commercial establishments. Scaggsville generally falls within ZIP code 20723, assigned to Laurel, though the town formerly had its own post office.

At the 2000 census the Scaggsville area was counted as part of the North Laurel census-designated place.

== History ==
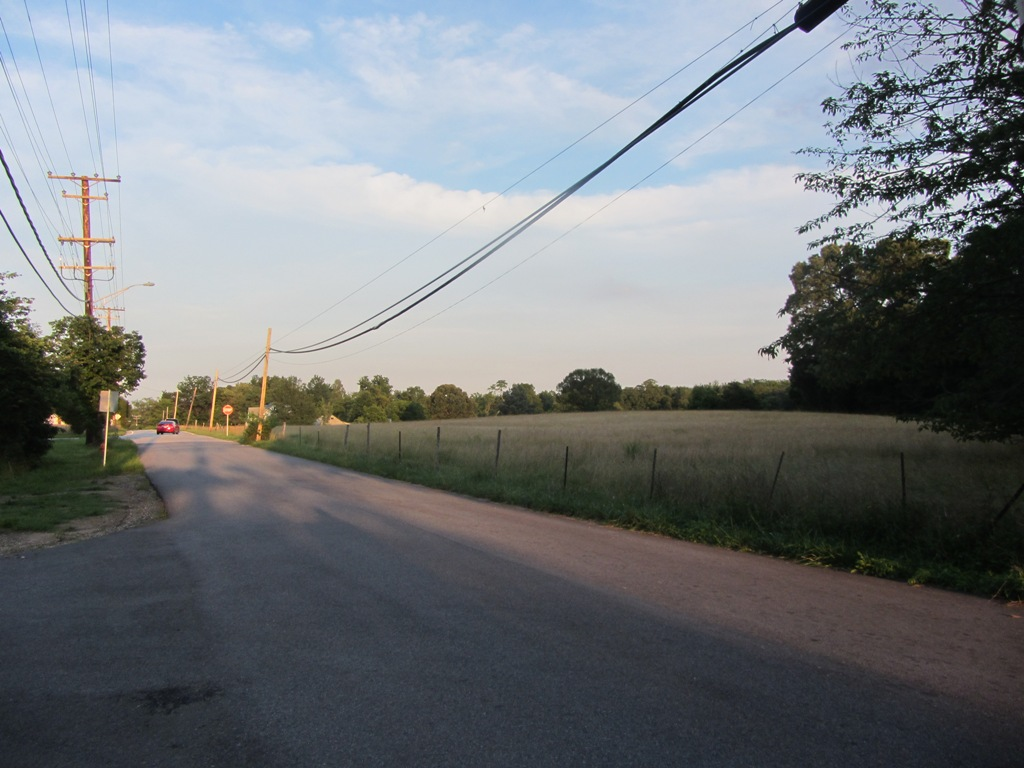
Highridge neighborhood

The town is named for the Scaggs family, who settled 700 acres (2.8 km^{2}) of farmland in the 1830s and continue to live in the region. The area also used the name "Hells Corner" as a postal address in Civil War times. The historic path running through town was shown on maps as far back as 1795. This path is now named Lime Kiln Road, Scaggsville Road, and Whiskey Bottom Road. In the 19th century, Scaggsville was a stagecoach stop on the trip from Washington, D.C., to Baltimore. Stagecoaches would ford the Patuxent River until a wooden bridge was built in 1859, which washed out in an 1868 flood. Three additional bridges washed out by 1883 before a steel truss bridge was built. In 1941, the Maryland Gazette reported that the town consisted of 15 households. Today, it has grown to a suburban community made up of several neighborhoods.

== Geography ==
Scaggsville is located in southern Howard County, bordered by Fulton to the west, Columbia to the north, North Laurel to the southeast, West Laurel in Prince George's County to the south, and Burtonsville in Montgomery County to the southwest. The Patuxent River forms the southern edge of the Scaggsville CDP, as well as the Howard County line. U.S. Route 29 follows the western edge of the CDP, leading north 5 miles (8 km) to Columbia and south 19 miles (31 km) to downtown Washington, D.C. Interstate 95 forms the eastern edge of the CDP, leading northeast 18 miles (29 km) to downtown Baltimore and southwest 9 miles (14 km) to Washington's Beltway. Maryland Route 216 runs east–west through the center of Scaggsville, connecting US 29 and I-95, and leads 4 miles (6 km) southeast to Laurel.

== Demographics ==
Historical population
Census	Pop.	Note	%±
2010	8,548		—
2020	9,217		7.8%
U.S. Decennial Census; 2010 2020

=== Racial and ethnic composition ===
Scaggsville CDP, Maryland – Racial and ethnic composition Note: the US Census treats Hispanic/Latino as an ethnic category. This table excludes Latinos from the racial categories and assigns them to a separate category. Hispanics/Latinos may be of any race.
Race / Ethnicity (NH = Non-Hispanic)	Pop 2010	Pop 2020	% 2010	% 2020
White alone (NH)	x	5,296	x	57.46%
Black or African American alone (NH)	x	1,035	x	11.23%
Native American or Alaska Native alone (NH)	x	3	x	0.03%
Asian alone (NH)	x	1,838	x	19.94%
Native Hawaiian or Pacific Islander alone (NH)	x	1	x	0.01%
Other race alone (NH)	x	78	x	0.85%
Mixed race or Multiracial (NH)	x	452	x	4.90%
Hispanic or Latino (any race)	x	514	x	5.58%
Total	8,548	9,217	x	100.00%

=== 2020 census ===
As of the 2020 census, Scaggsville had a population of 9,217. The median age was 42.7 years. 23.5% of residents were under the age of 18 and 15.9% of residents were 65 years of age or older. For every 100 females there were 96.7 males, and for every 100 females age 18 and over there were 93.9 males age 18 and over.

100.0% of residents lived in urban areas, while 0.0% lived in rural areas.

There were 3,084 households in Scaggsville, of which 38.4% had children under the age of 18 living in them. Of all households, 72.7% were married-couple households, 7.8% were households with a male householder and no spouse or partner present, and 16.3% were households with a female householder and no spouse or partner present. About 13.5% of all households were made up of individuals and 6.3% had someone living alone who was 65 years of age or older.

There were 3,127 housing units, of which 1.4% were vacant. The homeowner vacancy rate was 0.4% and the rental vacancy rate was 2.4%.

=== 2010 census ===
Scaggsville first appeared as census designated place in the 2010 U.S. census carved out of the North Laurel CDP although it was incorrectly defined, showing a population of 24,333. The corrected counts for Scaggsville CDP for 2010 are 8,548 population, 2,838 housing units, a land area of 13,514,192 square meters (5.218 square miles), and a water area of 913,012 square meters (0.353 square miles). Specific racial data is not available for the area in 2010.

== Name change efforts ==
Some residents have advocated changing the name of Scaggsville to Rocky Gorge, since the community borders the Rocky Gorge Reservoir (also known as the T. Howard Duckett Reservoir) on the Patuxent River. Advocates for renaming were often affluent newcomers who objected to the name's perceived rural connotations, with some saying the name sounded "hickish" or "like the boonies". Some older residents and some members of the Scaggs family found the proposal insulting. Efforts to change the name, however, have been unsuccessful.

== See also ==
- Partnership (Fulton, Maryland) – historic building also known as the "Moore House" (owned by Mrs. George Skaggs until 1958)
- Souder House – Scaggsville corner store operated over 100 years.
