= Waters–Fulton Store and Post Office =

- Location within Maryland Location within the United States
- 39°09′01″N 76°55′24″W
- Location: Fulton, Maryland

History
- Built: 1860s

Site notes
- Architectural style: Wood

Waters-Fulton Store and Post Office, also known as Water's Store, Fulton, is a historic home located in Fulton, Howard County, Maryland, US.

The post office and store served as the center of town for Fulton, Maryland. It is situated on a slave plantation purchased by Richard Waters in 1861. On December 29, 1874, the "Water's Store" post office opened. In 1877, a road was commissioned by the county between Water's Store and Souder House. In 1887 Frederick Brinkman purchased the farm and store. The post office's name was changed to "Fulton" in 1887.

== See also ==
- List of Howard County properties in the Maryland Historical Trust
- Clark's Elioak Farm
- Fairfield Farm
- MacAlpine
