= Partnership (Fulton, Maryland) =

- Interactive map of the Partnership area

General information
- Location: Cooper Road, Phoenix, Maryland; moved from Pindell School Road, Fulton, Maryland in 1963
- Coordinates: 39.161485°N 76.921166°W
- Completed: 1722

Height
- Roof: Shingle

Partnership, is a historic building constructed in Fulton, Maryland, in Howard County, although the land was part of Anne Arundel County at the time of the construction. The building was formerly one of the oldest in Howard County until its relocation in 1963 to Phoenix, Maryland in Baltimore County.

Partnership is a three-bay wide brick construction house with a gambrel roof. The bricks were created on-site, some with animal footprints imbedded.

In 1719, the land named Partnership was patented by Thomas Worthington (c. 1890–1753). A brick home was constructed on-site at what was a slave tobacco plantation. Worthington's daughter Katherine (1720–1788) took the property as part of a dowry to her marriage with Captain Nicholas Gassaway. Captain Gassaway (c. 1719–1755) resided on the property and estate in 1775 when he willed it to his son Brice John Gassaway (1755–1806). The house was bought by James Cox, then sold to Hamilton Moore in 1851. The house is best known as the Moore house, with Moore's granddaughter, Mrs. George Skaggs, owning it until 1960. The 700-acre farm was part of "Hell's Corner", with the southern boundary forming Scaggsville Road, and the post stop of Scaggsville, Maryland. The property was purchased by the Khrum family. In 1963, the property was purchased at the same time as large tracts of farmland were being assembled for the creation of The Rouse Company development Columbia. P.T. McHenry, the developer of Mooresfield single family homes sold the home to William W. Cooper for its relocation to Phoenix, Maryland, after the outbuildings were demolished.

The building was featured in the 1969 film adaptation of Helen Jean Burn's Nightmare's Child on Maryland Public Television.
