= Oxford Branch (Pennsylvania Railroad) =

Railway line in the United States

Pennsylvania Railroad
Overview
- Headquarters: Clayton, DE
- Locale: Delmarva Peninsula
- Dates of operation: 1868–1998

Technical
- Track gauge: 4 ft 8 1/2 in (1,435 mm) standard gauge

The Oxford Branch of the Pennsylvania Railroad (PRR) is a former railroad corridor from Clayton, Delaware through Delaware and Maryland to Oxford, Maryland. The railroad that ran on it was built in pieces from 1857 to 1871 and served passenger and freight customers in Delaware's Kent County as well as those in Maryland's Caroline, Queen Anne and Talbot counties. It went through a series of owners and operators and scaled back operations as need demanded. The section between Easton and Oxford was abandoned in 1959 and, after a period of unprofitability, operations on all but a small section of the line from Clayton to Easton ceased in 1998. In 2013, Maryland railbanked the corridor all the way to Easton. Communities along the corridor have built three small segments of trail on it, and more are planned.

== History ==
The Oxford Branch started out as the rail line of the Maryland and Delaware Rail Road (M&D), which was incorporated in 1854 to build a railroad from Talbot county to the then-planned Delaware Railroad (DRC) line at Smyrna Station (later Clayton, DE). Work on that line began in 1856, and the Philadelphia, Wilmington and Baltimore Railroad (PW&B) began to operate it on January 1, 1857.

Work on the M&D line began almost a year later on December 27, 1857 and the line was graded and bridged as far as Greensboro, Maryland by 1859. Work was interrupted by the Civil War and finally resumed in October 1865. By 1868 trains were running to Ridgely and by 1869 to Hillsborough. The first trains reached Easton on August 14, 1869 and the first freight train left there on August 31. Daily passenger traffic didn't begin until November 15, 1869. An extension to Oxford was built in 1871.

In 1877, bondholders foreclosed on the railroad, it was sold on December 20 of that year and later reorganized as the Delaware and Chesapeake Railroad (D&CR).

In 1890, the Baltimore & Eastern Shore Railroad built a line that crossed the D&CR line at Easton.

In 1902 there was a major reorganization of the Easter Shore railroads. The D&CR was transferred to the DRC and the PW&B merged with the Baltimore and Potomac to form the Philadelphia, Baltimore and Washington Railroad (PB&W). At that time the DRC became the PB&W's "Delaware Division" and the D&CR became the Oxford Branch.

On January 1, 1918 the railroad became part of the Pennsylvania Railroad system.

As was true elsewhere, competition from automobiles cut into DCR patronage. Passenger service ended on August 8, 1949. Freight service between Easton and Oxford ended in 1957 and the line past Easton was abandoned in 1959.

Facing financial difficulties in the 1960s, the Pennsylvania Railroad merged with its rival New York Central in 1968 forming the Penn Central which itself filed for what was, at that time, the largest bankruptcy in U.S. history in 1970.

=== Maryland and Delaware Railroad ===
When Penn Central Railroad stopped operating in 1976, the Oxford Branch was one of three in Delmarva that were omitted from the system plan for Conrail. To prevent them from being discontinued, the Maryland and Delaware governments selected the Maryland and Delaware Railroad Company (MDDE) - a newly formed railroad, not a successor to the company that built the Oxford Branch - to serve as the designated operator starting in 1977.

The line operated at a loss for years, with declining and use and in 1982 it was estimated that the line needed $1 million in repairs. Freight operations ended on February 22, 1983 and the Maryland Department of Transportation abandoned the line that same year.

=== Chesapeake Railroad ===
In the mid-80's the Chesapeake Railroad (CHRR) formed to resume service with excursion, dinner trains and some freight between Clayton and Queen Anne and from Queen Anne to Denton on the Denton Branch of the old Queen Anne's Railroad. In 1989, they used State Railroad Administration money to clear part of the line. They signed an agreement with MTA to do so in 1993, received permission from the ICC the next year and started running both freight and excursion trains in 1995.

The railroad struggled, never travelled farther south than Queen Anne, running fewer than 30 cars a year in the time it operated and stopped running in late 1996. In 1998 the state terminated the CHRR's operating agreement and a few days later a final run was made to clear equipment from the track.

The rolling stock of the CHRR was moved to Clayton. The privately owned PRR N3 was then moved to the Walkersville Southern Railroad near Frederick, MD as was the ex-RF&P 923, owned by the Chesapeake Railway Association where it underwent renovation for excursion service. The RF&P Pullman was presumably scrapped. In late 2003, the two 80-ton Whitcombs were purchased by the Northeast Railroads Historical Society and moved to Topton, PA. One was disassembled for restoration for the other Whitcomb, but by 2007 they had both been scrapped.

=== Demolition and Disposition ===
The portion of the right-of-way through Easton, including the bridge over North Fork Tanyard Branch, was converted to a rail trail in 1998.

In 2005, MTA filed intent to terminate service on the line, requested a certificate of interim trail use and started planning, and trying, to turn the full ROW into a rail trail, called the Upper Chesapeake Rail Trail, but the project has stalled.

The next year it filed to abandon the use of the right-of-way for railroad transportation and to covert it to a recreational trail.

Delaware's June 2006 Rail-to-Trail & Rail-with-Trail Facility Master Plan recommended converting the railroad right-of-way to a rail trail.

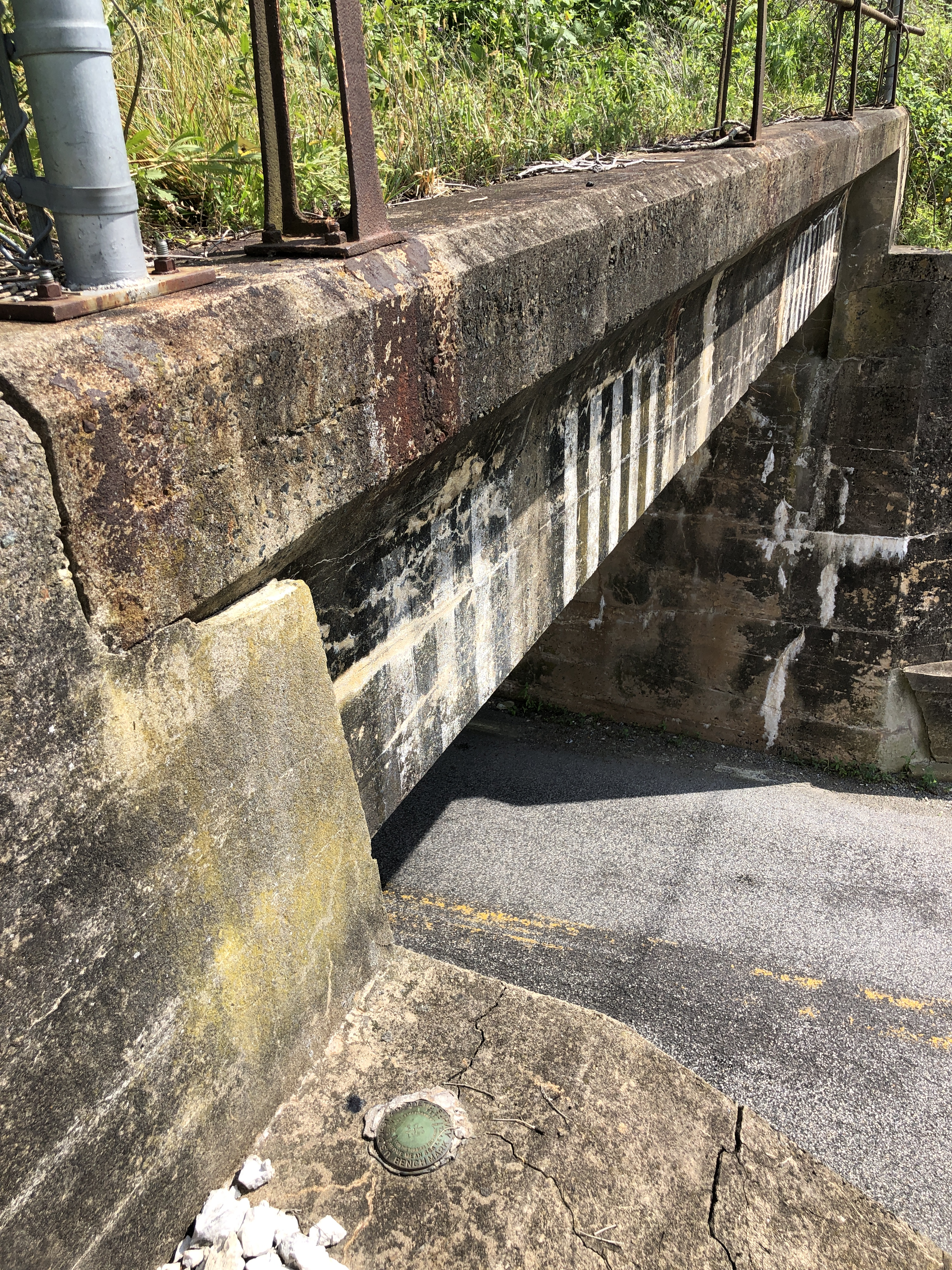
Oxford Branch overpass over Maryland State Route 303 (Tappers Corner Road)

Approximately 2000 feet of the right-of-way in Ridgeley, MD was turned into a rail trail in 2009.

In March 2010, the bridge over Queen Anne Highway (MD-404) in Queen Anne, MD was removed to allow the highway to be widened.

MTA attempted to enter into trail use agreements with the Delaware Department of Natural Resources and Environmental Control and the Maryland Department of Natural Resources, but it was rejected by the Surface Transportation Board in 2013, but that same year Maryland was able to railbank the corridor all the way to Easton.

Around 2019, the railroad bridge over Tuckahoe Creek in Queen Anne, MD and a short section of the railroad ROW in Tuckahoe State Park were turned into a potion of Anna's Trail and also serves as part of the American Discovery Trail.

In 2024 a group called "Talbot Thrive" proposed turning the non-railbanked ROW from Oxford to Easton into the Oyster Trail and the section from Easton to Tuckahoe State Park into the Frederick Douglass Rail Trail and the state requested money to design the project. The State of Maryland launched a project to design the 10-mile long Douglass Rail Trail the next year.

== Remnants ==
Along the right-of-way, disused tracks, bridges, overpasses, mileposts and embankments still remain. The overpasses at Tappers Corner Road and Old Queen Anne's Highway, as well as bridges over Oldtown Branch, Forge Branch (Ford and Jarrel Branch), Peachblossom Creek and Trippe Creek are among the remnants.

In addition, the former railyard in Clayton is now a BioDiesel plant and it retained about 2000 feet of track to serve as a siding.
