= Baltimore, Chesapeake and Atlantic Railway =

Railroad between Claiborne and Ocean City, Maryland, US

Baltimore, Chesapeake and Atlantic Railway Company
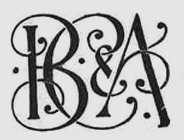
- 1906 Map
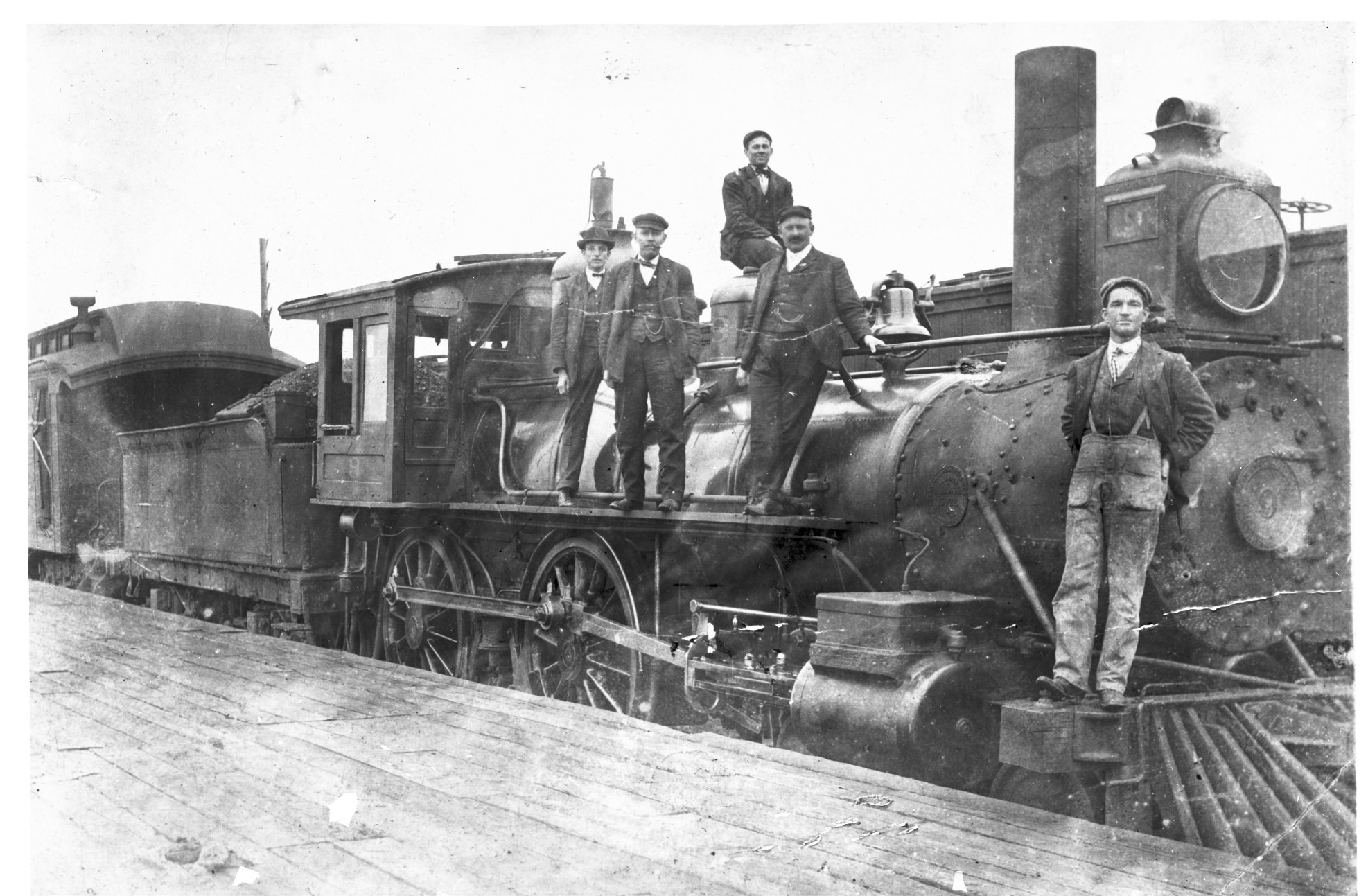
- Locomotive and crew at Claiborne, Maryland

Overview
- Headquarters: Baltimore, Maryland
- Locale: Maryland, United States
- Dates of operation: 1894–1928
- Predecessor: Baltimore and Eastern Shore Railroad; Wicomico and Pokomoke Railroad; Worcester Railroad
- Successor: Baltimore and Eastern Railroad Company

Technical
- Track gauge: 4 ft 8 1/2 in (1,435 mm) standard gauge
- Electrification: No
- Length: 87 miles (140 km)

The Baltimore, Chesapeake and Atlantic Railway, nicknamed Black Cinders & Ashes, was a railroad that ran 87 miles (140.0 km) from Claiborne, Maryland (with steamship connections to Baltimore), to Ocean City, Maryland from 1894 to 1924. It included 15.6 miles (25.11 km) of sidings. It was chartered as the Baltimore and Eastern Shore Railroad in 1886, started construction in 1889 and began operation in 1890 after spending $2.356 million on construction.($_{2025}=84,423,000) When it started operation it purchased the Wicomico and Pocomoke Railroad Company, merging it into its own operations.

Over the following 100 years, it struggled to remain profitable, changed names and ownership several times and abandoned most of its rail line. The only portion that remains in service today is the 3.65-mile (5.87 km) long Willards Industrial Track, the 0.65-mile (1.05 km) Mardella Industrial Track and the 0.6-mile (0.97 km) Mill Street Industrial Track - all in Salisbury, Maryland - operated by Delmarva Central Railroad on track owned by Norfolk Southern Railroad. Track, bridges and right-of-way remain across Delmarva and at least one portion has been turned into a rail trail.

== History ==
=== Baltimore & Eastern Shore Railroad Company (1886–1894) ===
The Baltimore, Chesapeake and Atlantic Railway was originally chartered in 1876 as the Baltimore & Eastern Shore Railroad Company and then reauthorized in 1886, incorporated March 2, 1886. The railroad started construction in 1889, completed on December 1, 1890. Also in 1890, the Baltimore & Eastern Shore Railroad Company purchased the Wicomico & Pocomoke Railroad (incorporated on February 15, 1848), consisting of approximately 30 miles of track from Salisbury to Ocean City, Maryland. The latter was chartered to operate from Salisbury to Ocean City, Maryland, of which the section from Salisbury to Berlin was opened for operation on May 1, 1868, and the section from Berlin to Ocean City, in 1876. For the first year of operation, B&ES also operated a rail-transfer ferry from Bay Ridge (near Annapolis, Maryland) where the connection was made to Baltimore by rail.

B&ES struggled financially and it was put in the hands of a receiver after only nine months of operation. The receiver terminated the rail-transfer service to Bay Ridge and, instead, started direct passenger service between Baltimore and Claiborne The new objective of the railroad was to preserve the business connection of Baltimore with the Eastern Shore country, which was largely diverted to Philadelphia through the control of the Eastern Shore Railroad by the Philadelphia, Wilmington and Baltimore Railroad. The railroad was organized by Easton, Maryland, businessmen including Theophilus Tunis; Joseph B. Seth, who at the time was 69th Speaker of the Maryland House of Delegates; and others.

The railroad line as located extended from a terminus on the Chesapeake Bay, across the Eastern Shore, through Easton, to Salisbury, Maryland, where a connection was made with the Wicomico & Pocomoke road at Salisbury. The length of the road, as proposed, from the bay shore to Salisbury was to be 52 miles, and it was intended to make a line running diagonally across the Eastern Shore to Ocean City, 82 miles in length. From the proposed terminus on the bay shore the distance across Chesapeake Bay to Bay Ridge is 12 miles, which was to be covered by a ferry, and at Bay Ridge, a connection was to be made with the then new Bay Ridge Annapolis road, over which trains were to run to both the Annapolis & Baltimore Short Line and the Annapolis & Elk Ridge road. At the same time, the State authorized the railroad the right to "the right to own land and develop resorts, to own steamboats and wharves, and to merge or lease railroads outside of the state." The State authorized several municipalities to guarantee the bonds of up to $500,000 for the project.

==== Engineering and Construction ====
The B&ES started route location between Claiborne and Salisbury and completed location of the route in July 1886. The Railroad's Chief Engineer, William H. Eichelberger estimates the construction cost for the road to be $727,000 ($_{2025}=26,051,000) for the Claiborne-Salisbury segment, including a train ferry for Chesapeake service.

The railroad started construction in 1889, completed on December 1, 1890, as well as purchasing the Wicomico & Pocomoke Railroad The B&ES also operated a ferry from Claiborne to Annapolis, Maryland where connection was made to Baltimore by rail.

==== Revenue Operations ====
The venture was not successful as on August 29, 1894, the B&ES railroad was liquidated in a judicial sale and reorganized as the Baltimore, Chesapeake and Atlantic Railway Company.

=== Baltimore, Chesapeake and Atlantic Railway Company (1894–1928) ===
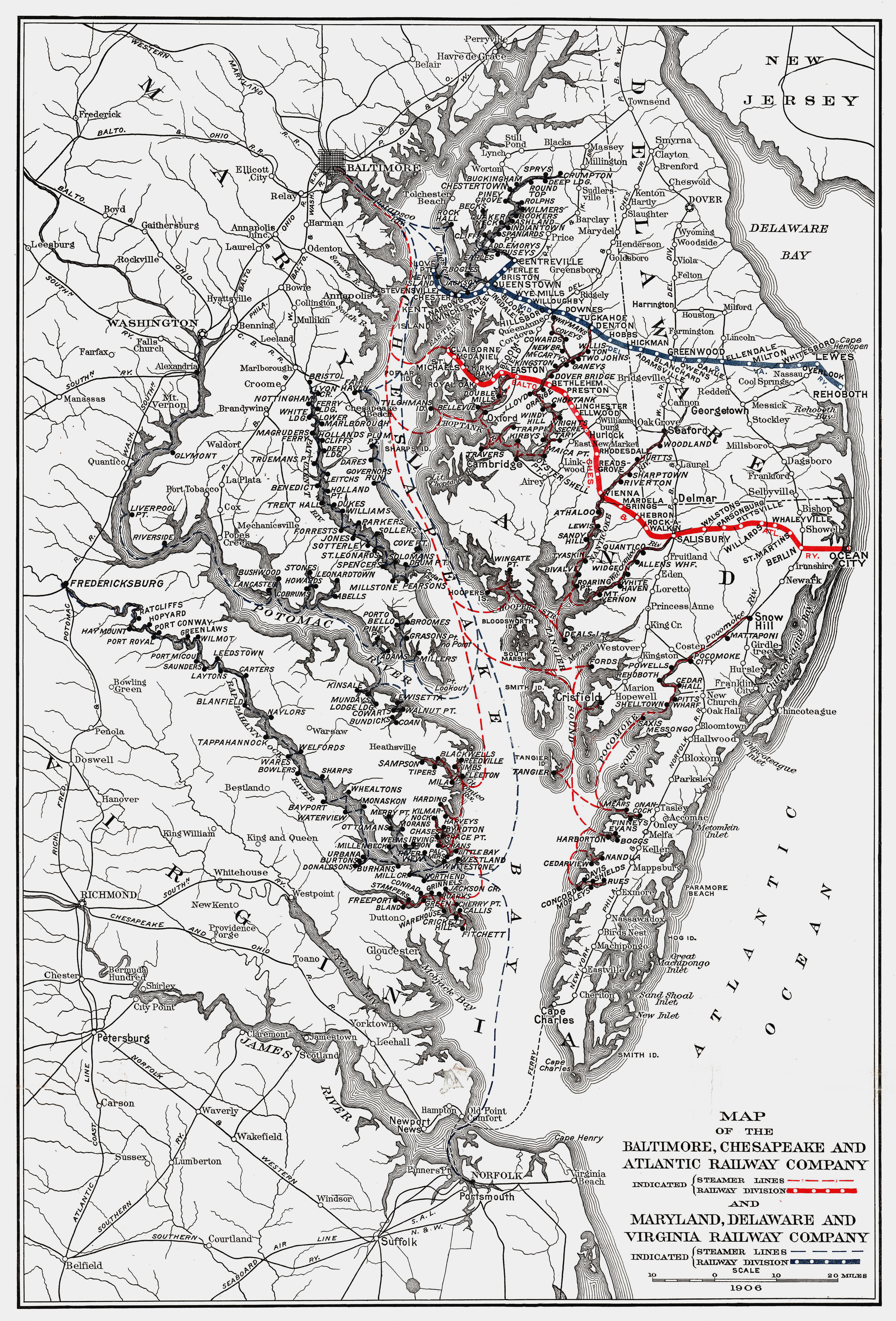
1906 map

The venture was not successful as on August 29, 1894, the B&ES railroad was liquidated in a judicial sale and the assets were sold to the re-organizers. The new owner, the Baltimore Chesapeake and Atlantic railroad (BC&A) was incorporated on August 30, 1894, with its principal office in Salisbury, Maryland. That same year, the railroad also acquired several steamboat companies; namely the Maryland, Choptank and Eastern Shore Steamboat Companies, all of Baltimore, for $1.7 million in waterline property, wharves and equipment. In 1902, the Pennsylvania Railroad (PRR) became the majority stockholder but BC&A still operated under its organization.

As of 1915, the railroad consisted of a single-track, standard-gauge railroad, covering a distance of about 87 miles, with a branch line about 0.5 mile long extending from Salisbury to Fulton, Maryland, making a total of 87.252 miles. It also owned 15.582 miles of yard and side tracks. The new, combined operations of the BC&A in railroad and waterlines had been profitable with $0.5 million in profit on a total investment of $4.325 million with a total revenue of $17.8 million for the period of 1894 – 1915 and controlled by the Pennsylvania railroad as majority stockholder. Dividends were paid on $1.5 million par value of 5 per cent cumulative preferred stock but none were paid on the common stock of $1.0 million and none paid on the preferred stock after 1912.

By 1921, the railroad had turned unprofitable due in part to private autos and trucks to the point where in March, 1922, it stopped making payments on its first mortgage. In 1921, the Pennsylvania Railroad had to provide financial assistance in order for BC&A to make payments due under its first mortgage. This continued intermittently until 1926 when the Pennsylvania announced it was unwilling to continue this assistance. The following year, the trustee for the first mortgage, Chatham National Bank & Trust Co. of NY filed for foreclosure. The railroad was sold on March 29, 1928, to Charles Carter, representing Pennsylvania railroad interests and reorganized as the Baltimore and Eastern railroad, entirely owned by the Pennsylvania Railroad.

=== Baltimore and Eastern Railroad Company (1923–1982) ===
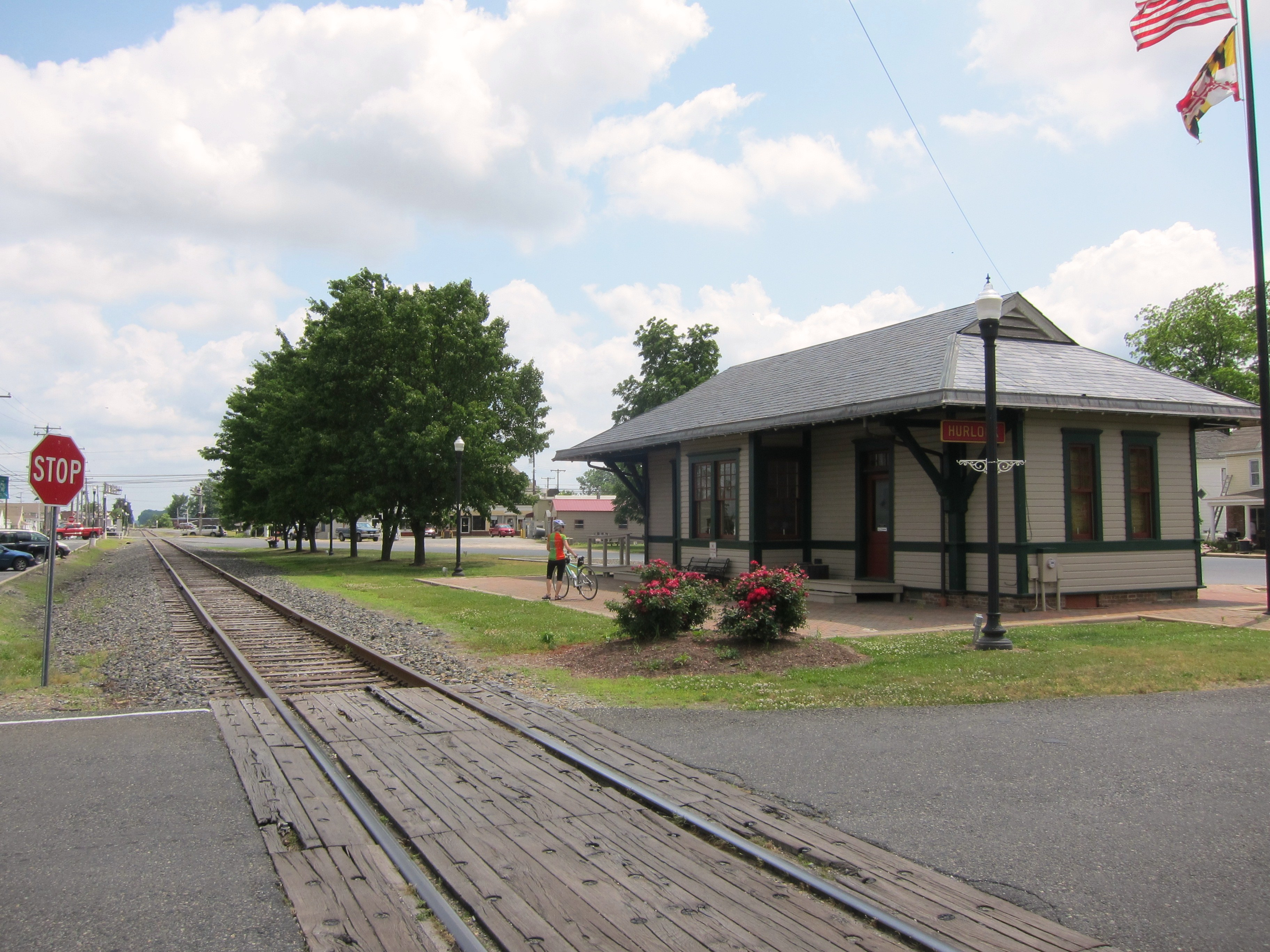
Train station in Hurlock, Maryland

By 1921, the railroad had turned unprofitable due in part to private autos and trucks to the point where in March 1922, it stopped making payments on its first mortgage. In 1921, PRR provided financial assistance in order for BC&A to make payments due under its first mortgage. This continued intermittently until 1926 when PRR announced it was unwilling to continue this assistance. The following year, the trustee for the first mortgage, Chatham National Bank & Trust Co. of NY filed for foreclosure. The railroad was sold on March 29, 1928, to Charles Carter, representing PRR interests and reorganized as the Baltimore and Eastern Railroad (B&E) entirely owned by PRR.

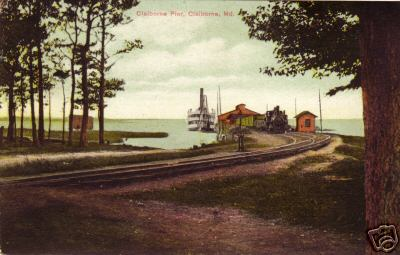
Claiborne Wharf with BC&A tracks

Into the 1930s the Baltimore and Eastern Railroad operated passenger service from Ocean City, to Easton stopping in Berlin, Hurlock and at Salisbury's Union Station among others. It also ran trains along a branch line from Salisbury to Delmar, Delaware and on the old Queen Anne's line between Queenstown and Love Point, a town on the eastern shore of the Chesapeake Bay. In 1932 cross peninsula travel was stopped when the Nanticoke trestle at Vienna was closed and then service to Ocean City ended the next year when the Sinepuxent Bay bridge was damaged in a storm.

By 1938 they had terminated passenger service. The railroad abandoned sections of line throughout the 1950's-1980's.

Parts of the railroad survived as part of Penn Central up through its bankruptcy and merger into Conrail, but it was omitted from the system plan for Conrail.

=== Maryland Department of Transportation (1982– ) ===
In 1982, the State of Maryland purchased segments of the what had been the Baltimore Chesapeake and Atlantic railway from the bankrupt Penn Central and transferred them for use by the Maryland Department of Transportation. For some time afterward, the section from Hurlock and Preston was operated by the Maryland and Delaware Railroad but it stopped service by 2008.

From 1977 to 1988 a tourist railroad ran from Berlin to Ocean City. It used a small diesel engine and cars that are now part of the Wilmington and Western tourist railroad in upper Delaware.

The sections of rail west of Preston and between Vienna and Hebron have been abandoned and not railbanked.

The remaining right of way has several owners. Between Preston and Hurlock, it is owned by MDOT, as is the section between Hebron and Salisbury. Between Hurlock and Vienna the right-of-way is owned by Delmarva Power and Lighting. The eastern section from Salisbury to Ocean City is owned by Norfolk Southern.

== Legacy ==
=== Racial segregation and the path to civil rights ===
In 1910, the state of Maryland established the Maryland Public Service Commission and granted it power over common carriers. Similar in nature to the federal Interstate Commerce Commission, "...the primary concern of the Maryland Public Service Commission was rate regulation, but it also had power to hear complaints about service." Shortly after its establishment, William Ashbie Hawkins represented several plaintiffs before the Public Service Commission protesting against the segregated conditions both in boats and trains under the Jim Crow law.

- December 1911, Hawkins filed suit against the Baltimore, Chesapeake and Atlantic Railway for discrimination on its Chesapeake Bay ferryboats, the Avalon and the Joppa. The steamer Avalon and Joppa were sister ships originally built in 1888 for the Maryland Steamboat Company for the Choptank River route. Hawkins alleged several discrimination practices by the railroad, namely forcing blacks to use colored only cabins that were cramped and poorly ventilated, allowing blacks to eat only what food was left after all the whites had eaten and on one trip forcing "...ministers of the African Methodist Episcopal church and their wives who had taken a steamboat to Cambridge for a meeting were forced to sit in a salon all night because there were not enough staterooms available to them."
- Hawkins again sued BC&A over discrimination. In the case, Thomas Turner, a Baltimore school teacher complained that "...the only compartments in which African Americans could ride were a vestibule to or a partition in the smoking area for white men."

Though Hawkins' various complaints were dismissed, the Public Service Commission did recommend changes such as ordering the BC&A to provide seating (with partitions) in nonsmoking as well as smoking cars to assure greater equality in the future. It would be another four decades until another Marylander, Elmer Henderson, was successful in arguing to the United States Supreme Court in 1950 that "...segregative dining practices on the railroads could not be equal".

"Under the rules of an interstate railroad, dining cars are divided so as to allot ten tables exclusively to white passengers and one table exclusively to Negro passengers, and a curtain separates the table reserved for Negroes from the others. Under these rules, only four Negro passengers may be served at one time, and then only at the table reserved for Negroes. Other Negroes who present themselves are compelled to await a vacancy at that table, although there may be many vacancies elsewhere in the diner. The rules impose a like deprivation upon white passengers whenever more than 40 of them seek to be served at the same time and the table reserved for Negroes is vacant."

The court held that these rules violated the Interstate Commerce Act, which makes it unlawful for a railroad in interstate commerce "to subject any particular person . . . to any undue or unreasonable prejudice or disadvantage in any respect whatsoever." Henderson's court victory in integrating interstate travel contributed to Maryland repeal of its railroad segregation laws in 1951. David Bogen writes, "generations of protesters and lawyers who resisted segregation ... in Maryland played their role in making it possible for a woman in Montgomery, Alabama ...(Rosa Parks)... to change the world."

=== Remnants ===
Along the right of way track, bridges and other remnants remain. A section in Salisbury, Maryland, from the old New York, Philadelphia and Norfolk Railroad line to the ConAgra Facility in Salisbury is still in use; and at least one piece has been turned into a rail trail.

The train shed that used to serve as the end of the line in Claiborne, Maryland was dismantled, moved to Saint Michaels, Maryland and repurposed as part of the Chesapeake Bay Maritime Museum.

A bridge over Broad Creek west of St. Michaels remains.

A section of the trail in St. Michaels has been turned into the St. Michael's Nature Trail.

A piece of the old bridge over Oak Creek at Newcomb, Maryland remains and has been decked over for use as a community pier.

Much of the track between Preston and Hurlock remains, but is not in use. It's owned by MDOT. Additional part of the Preston platform still exists just north of Choptank Road.

Hebron Depot in Hebron, Maryland was restored around 2013 and now serves as a museum.

Fulton Station in Salisbury remains.

== See also ==
- List of defunct Maryland railroads

== Notes ==
W. H. Eichelberger recorded a Plat of Lots for Sale at Wrights Summit, Clinch Valley Railroad, Tazewell Co., Va. 19 x 15 in. [FOLDER C-5], Special Collections, University Libraries (0434), Virginia Tech, 560 Drillfield Drive, Blacksburg, VA 24061. In 1879, the Harrisburg and Potomac railroad Officers have been elected including W Eichelberger. The Railway World, Volume 5, 1879.
