= Maryland and Delaware Railroad =

Class III short-line railroad in Maryland and Delaware, United States

Maryland and Delaware Railroad Company

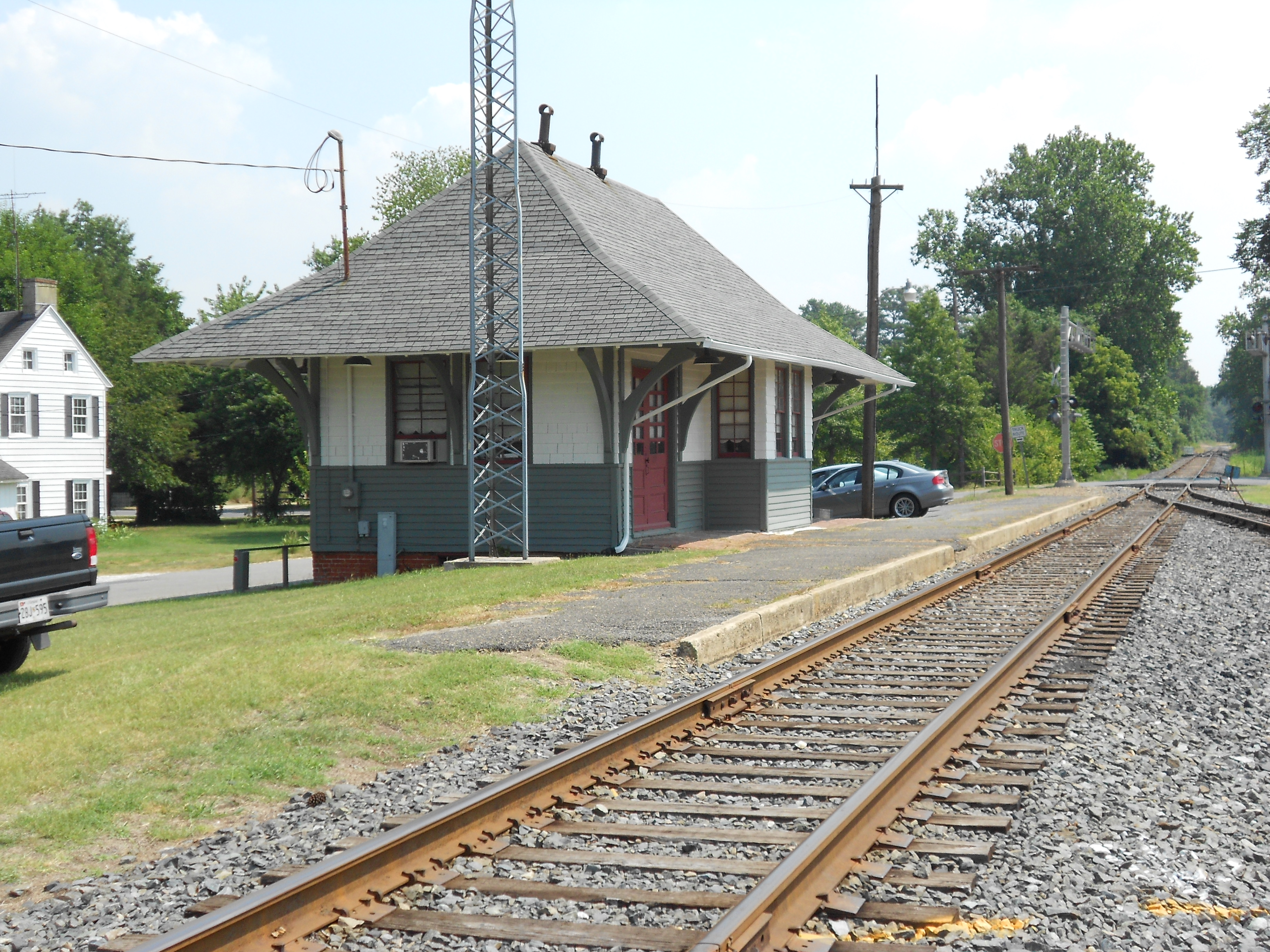
- Historic train station in Federalsburg, Maryland, restored as headquarters of Maryland and Delaware Railroad

Overview
- Headquarters: Federalsburg, Maryland
- Reporting mark: MDDE
- Locale: Delaware and Eastern Maryland, United States
- Dates of operation: 1977–2025
- Predecessor: Penn Central (1968-1976); Pennsylvania Railroad (pre-1968)
- Successor: Delmarva Central Railroad

Technical
- Track gauge: 4 ft 8 1/2 in (1,435 mm) standard gauge
- Length: 120 mi (190 km)

Other
- Website: www.mdde.com

The Maryland and Delaware Railroad Company (reporting mark MDDE) is a Class III short-line railroad, formed in 1977 to operate several branch lines of the former Penn Central Railroad in both Maryland and Delaware, United States. These branches were omitted from the system plan for Conrail in 1976 and would have been discontinued without state subsidies. As an alternative to the higher cost of subsidizing Conrail as the operator of the branch lines, the Maryland and Delaware governments selected the Maryland and Delaware Railroad Company (MDDE) to serve as the designated operator. In 2025, it was purchased by Carload Express and folded into that company's Delmarva Central Railroad operation.

The railroad did not own any of the track it uses until 2000 when it acquired a line between Frankford, Delaware and Snow Hill, Maryland from the Snow Hill Shippers Association. The railroad operated on 92 miles of track and ran out of a restored station in Federalsburg, Maryland until 2025 when it was purchased by Carload Express. Concurrent with its sale, the Snow Hill Line was broken into two parts and sold to the Delaware Central Railroad (DCR) and to Old Line Holdings, the company that previously owned the MDDE. After the sale the MDDE operated on just 73.76 miles of track.

The railroad is not affiliated with the similarly named 19th Century Maryland and Delaware Rail Road Company, though it did for a time run on the corridor that the earlier railroad built.

== History ==
MDDE was incorporated in the State of Maryland on June 20, 1977, as a closely held, small railroad company. At that time, the states of Maryland and Delaware were paying subsidies to Conrail to operate branch lines, still owned by Penn Central, serving rural communities.

The Maryland Department of Transportation selected MDDE to operate five of the rural branch lines, which the Maryland Department of Transportation (MDOT) purchased, in August 1977. These included the current Northern Line (sometimes considered two lines - the Chestertown Line to Chestertown, Maryland and the Cambridge Secondary Track (USRA line 168) to Cambridge, Maryland) and Seaford Lines, the discontinued Oxford Branch between Clayton, Delaware and Easton, Maryland, the discontinued Denton Branch between Queen Anne, MD and Denton, MD and the discontinued Preston Branch between Hurlock, Maryland and Preston, Maryland.

A fifth line was added when the Snow Hill Shippers Association purchased the branch currently known as the Snow Hill Line in 1982 and hired MDDE to serve as operator.

The MDDE reduced its operations the next year. The Denton and Oxford Branches had been operating at a loss for years, with declining use and in 1982 it was estimated that they needed $1 million in repairs. MDOT decided to end freight operations on those lines, which ceased on February 22, 1983, and abandoned the lines that same year.

MDDE expanded operations in 1994 when it was awarded a five-year contract by Delaware to operate the Milton Industrial Track between Ellendale, Delaware and Milton, Delaware, and another branch between Georgetown, Delaware and Lewes, Delaware. But in 1999, MDDE did not seek renewal of the Delaware contract and the operation of the two lines was returned to the previous contractor, Delaware Coast Line Railroad.

In the late 1990' or early 2000's, MDDE closed its riverside Chestertown rail yard and trains cease to run through town. MDOT later railbanked the last 3.25 miles of the line and part of it was turned into the Wayne Gilchrest Trail. Around the same time, it stopped running past Woods Street in Cambridge to the rail yard in Cambridge and those parts were abandoned and part was turned into a rail trail.

In 2000, MDDE purchased the Snow Hill Branch and continued operations on the line. In 2012 it ceased operations south of Selbyville, Delaware when Tyson Foods, Inc. transferred its business from trains to trucks.

By 2008, MDDE stopped service on the Preston Branch.

In May 2016, MDDE stopped running past Hurlock on the Cambridge line when the state shut that part of the line down for safety reasons.

After years of using part of the Snow Hill branch for tank car storage, active rail service was restored to the Tysons Foods facility just north of Snow Hill in June 2019.

A new engine house in Massey, MD was opened in the fall of 2019.

In 2024, the MDDE submitted intent to stop service on three portions of its rail network: 1) the 8.23 mile section of the Cambridge line between US-50, near Linkwood, MD and Cedar Street in Cambridge; 2) the 6.1 mile Preston Branch, and 3) a 0.4-mile segment in Hurlock of the old Baltimore, Chesapeake and Atlantic Railway line to Ocean City.

In 2024, Carload Express - the owner of the Delaware Central Railroad (DCR), Allegheny Valley Railroad Company and Southwest Pennsylvania Railroad Company - agreed to purchase the MDDE. As part of the agreement, 23.7 miles of the 26.7 mile long Snow Hill was sold to Old Line with the other 3 miles purchased by the DCR. The sale was completed on April 23, 2025 and MDDE continued to operate on the Centreville/Chesterton and Seaford lines.

== Lines operated ==
The Maryland and Delaware Railroad operates on three segments of track throughout the Delmarva Peninsula. Each segment intersects the Delmarva Central Railroad, which interchanges with the Norfolk Southern Railway in Clayton, Delaware. Much of the ballast used on these branch lines consisted of slag, a by-product of steel manufacturing. By the time the Maryland State Rail Administration had begun maintenance and repair of these lines in the late 1970s, the slag had been crushed into a fine dust that held moisture and promoted the decay of the wooden timbers. Numerous maintenance and repair projects were completed during this time period, including tie replacement, joint bar replacement, and replacement of the long "switch timbers" at various sidings.

- The Northern Line intersects the Delmarva Central Railroad in Townsend, Delaware and heads west towards Massey, Maryland, where the line splits into two branches, one destined for Worton, Maryland and the other for Centreville, Maryland.
- The Seaford Line intersects the Delmarva Central Railroad in Seaford, Delaware and continues west towards Cambridge, Maryland, passing through Federalsburg, Maryland and Hurlock, Maryland and ending in Linkwood, Maryland.
- The Snow Hill Line intersects the Delmarva Central Railroad in Frankford, Delaware and continues south towards Snow Hill, Maryland.

=== Hurlock Express ===
MDDE provides an engine for the "Hurlock Express" at the annual Hurlock Fall Festival. Train rides during the one-day event, held on the first Saturday of October, run from the town of Hurlock's historic train station (built in 1867) to Federalsburg, along the MDDE's Seaford Line. The town of Hurlock owns the train station and two passenger cars. Except for the Hurlock Fall Festival, MDDE does not provide passenger service.
