= Clayton station (Delaware) =

Historic railway station in Delaware, US

Clayton
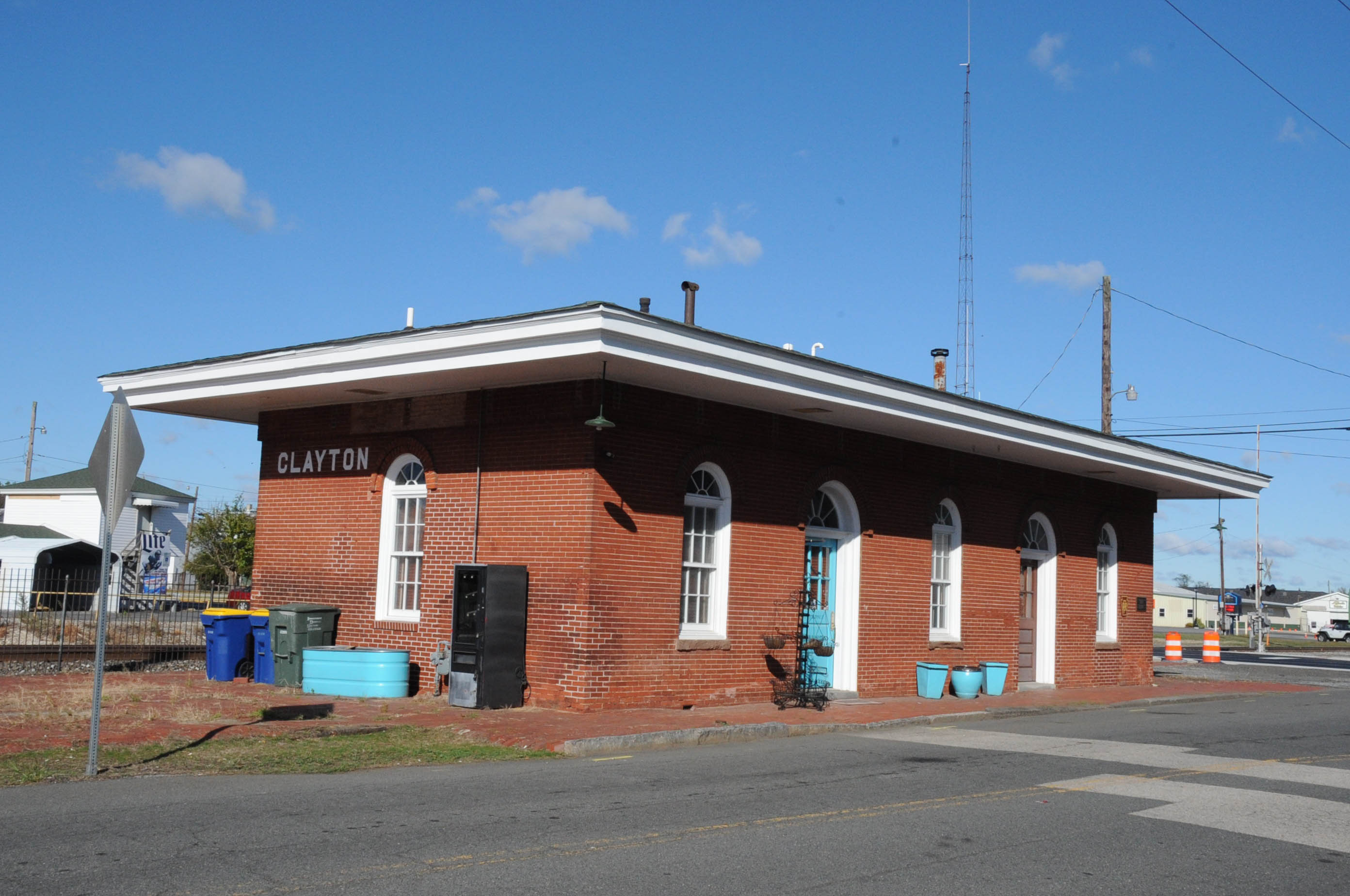
- Clayton station

General information
- Location: Bassett St., Clayton, Delaware
- Line: Delmarva Division

History
- Opened: 1855
- Closed: 1950s

Former services
Preceding station	Pennsylvania Railroad	Following station
Cheswold toward Cape Charles	Delmarva Division	Green Spring toward Wilmington
Kenton toward Oxford	Oxford Branch	Terminus
Terminus	Smyrna Branch	Smyrna Terminus
- Clayton Railroad Station
- U.S. National Register of Historic Places
- Location within Delaware Location within the United States
- Location: Bassett St., Clayton, Delaware
- Coordinates: 39°17′28″N 75°38′0″W
- Area: 0.3 acres (0.12 ha)
- Built: c. 1855
- Architectural style: Italianate
- NRHP reference No.: 86003066
- Added to NRHP: November 6, 1986
Location

Clayton Railroad Station is a historic railway station located at Clayton, Kent County, Delaware. It was built about 1855, and is a one-story, five-bay, brick, Italianate-style building. It as a low hip roof which extends about three feet from the building forming an overhang. It was built by the Delaware Railroad and remained in use as a passenger service into the 1950s. It later housed an antique shop.

It was added to the National Register of Historic Places in 1986.

== Description ==
Three metal vents pierce the roof of the Clayton Railroad Station. The pressed brickwork is all stretcher bond. All of the windows and doors are arched and have hood molds. Fanlights were originally above the doors and windows, and many of them remain today. All of the doors were originally double, but are now single. On the interior there are six rooms, two at either end that extend the width of the building. In the middle on the east side there are two rooms, one to the north that is nearly double in size of the one to the south which seems to have been the ticket office. On the west side there is a small freight office and a larger room. Originally the building had a brick floor. Very little of the original trim remains on the interior.

Nineteenth-century photographs reveal that the building originally had two ridge chimneys with decorative tops and that the windows were six-over-six, double-hung sash windows. The roofline has been slightly modified by the removal of the shallow brackets; evidence for these brackets remains in the brickwork. In addition, the passenger shed that extended to the south to protect freight and passengers has been removed.

A brick sidewalk surrounds the building, and a modern iron cemetery railing has been added as a safety measure.

== Significance ==
The Clayton Railroad Station is significant because of its history, as a part of the Delaware Railroad so important in the economic history of Delaware after the Civil War, and because of its architecture as an intact mid-nineteenth century Railroad depot with Italianate features.

Because the station is closely linked to the history of the Delaware Railroad, an important Delaware transportation system, the Clayton Railroad Station is being nominated to the National Register on the basis of Criterion A. The station is also significant architecturally and therefore is being nominated to the National Register on the basis of Criterion C.

The Station was erected around 1855 at a small settlement called Jimtown, near Smyrna, as the Delaware Railroad moved southward, and for nearly one hundred years served the diverse needs of the agrarian region surrounding it. The Delaware Railroad was originally chartered in 1836; however, this attempt was unsuccessful because insufficient funds were raised primarily as a result of the Panic of 1837 and the devastating economic conditions that plagued Delaware and the nation. John M. Clayton, Secretary of State under President Zachary Taylor, was a driving force behind this earliest attempt to establish a railroad.Afterward Jimtown or Smyrna Station as it was known, would be titled after Clayton.

The railroad was completed when it reached Seaford in December 1859 even though a spur was added to Delmar in 1859. In 1870, the Delaware Railroad and its branches formed the Delaware Division of the P. W. & B., and in 1885 the offices and shops of the Delaware Division were moved to Clayton. Thereafter as the division headquarters, Clayton became one of Delmarva's largest railroad centers.

The advent of the railroad in downstate Delaware greatly stimulated the economic development of the state. Shortly after the completion of the railroad, there was a bumper peach crop beginning a long union between fruit growers and the railroad. This union also created a great dependency on the railroad which in effect controlled the distribution of the produce leaving the growers at the mercy of the railroad.

Architecturally, the building is significant because much of its original fabric remains. Only the removal of the brick chimneys, shallow wood brackets, and the passenger shed have altered its original appearance. It is an excellent example of the Italianate style in its low hip roof that overhangs and its molded hoods over arched windows with fanlights.
