= Souder House =

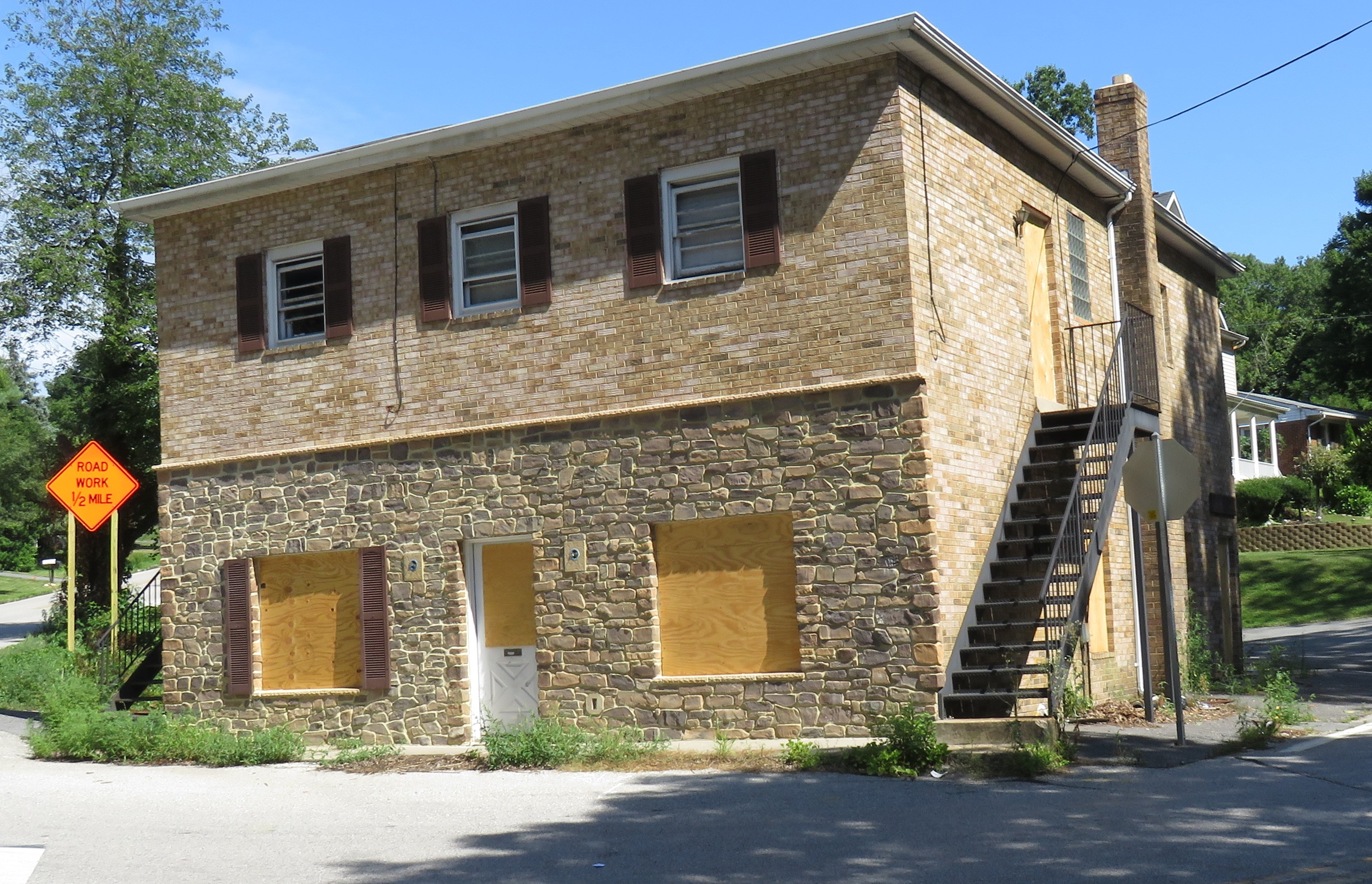
- Souder House - August 2015

- Location within Maryland Location within the United States
- 39°06′48″N 76°51′25″W
- Location: Scaggsville, Maryland

History
- Built: 19th Century

Site notes
- Area: Scaggsville, Maryland
- Architectural style: Stone

The Souder House is a historic commercial building located in Scaggsville, Maryland, Howard County, Maryland, now owned by the Howard County Government.

The building is two levels with stone veneer facing. The building is located on a former 250 acre slave plantation once owned by the Botterill Family. It is inset in a graded fork of Old Scaggsville Road and All Saint's road, serving as the primary entrance to the mill town of Laurel, Maryland on the other side of the Patuxent River. A bridge served as the community link to the Avondale Mill and main street connecting to the historic B&O railroad stop. The building served as a bar, grocery store, fueling station, and hair salon. Its last commercial owners were the Souder Construction Company. In December 2014, Howard County purchased the building for $325,000 holding a community meeting on its condition. In December 2015, the county held a meeting announcing its intention to demolish the building. The county did not publish a historical review, but claimed a historian had cleared the property because of its "mishmash" architecture.
