= Fulton, Maryland =

- Census-designated place
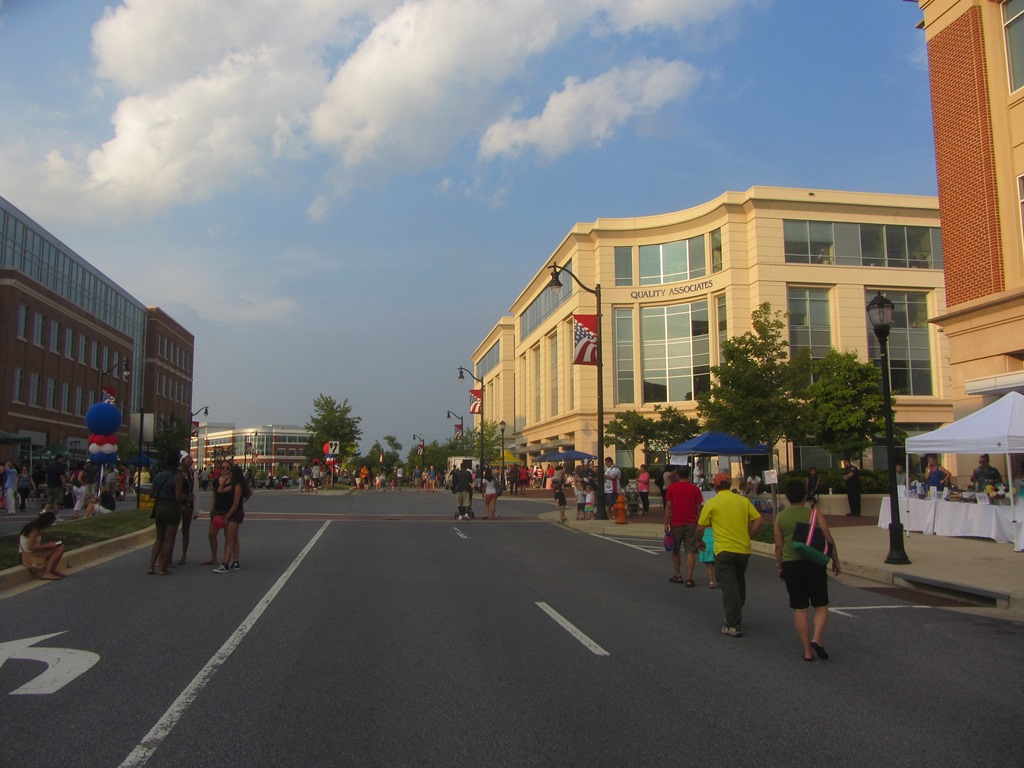
- Maple Lawn in Fulton

- Location within Maryland Location within the United States
- Coordinates: 39°9′4″N 76°55′22″W
- Country: United States of America
- State: Maryland
- County: Howard
- Surveyed: 1700
- Established: March 28, 1882; 144 years ago
- Founder: Thomas Browne II
- Named for: Charles C. Fulton

Area
  - Total: 3.80 sq mi (9.83 km^{2})
  - Land: 3.79 sq mi (9.81 km^{2})
  - Water: 0.0077 sq mi (0.02 km^{2})
- Elevation: 453 ft (138 m)

Population (2020)
  - Total: 5,916
  - Density: 1,562.6/sq mi (603.33/km^{2})
- Time zone: UTC-5 (EST)
  - Summer (DST): UTC-4 (EDT)
- ZIP code: 20759, 20723
- Area code: 240 and 301
- FIPS code: 24-31025

Fulton is a census-designated place located in southern Howard County, Maryland, United States. As of the 2010 census it had a population of 2,049.

== History ==
Indigenous peoples, likely Piscataway, used the land now known as Fulton for hunting and farming. The land's first European survey was by Thomas Browne, known as the "Patuxent Ranger", in 1700. In the mid-1700s Richard Snowden, the Quaker grandson of one of Maryland's first iron ore producers, purchased tracts of land up the Patuxent River valley. Fulton was then known as Queen Caroline Parish. In 1803 Rezin Hammond settled on a parcel of the land, and by 1805 Fulton was known as Hammond Directions and Snowden Second Addition. In 1855 German immigrants settled in the area.

By 1871, St Paul's Lutheran was founded to serve the German farming community and was expanded in 1933. By 1878 Fulton opened school house #3, a one-room school house for white children a half mile west of town that operated until 1939. The area was referred to as "Water's Store", for Richard Waters' blacksmith operation and post office which opened on December 29, 1874.

The name was changed to "Fulton", after the popular Baltimore Sun editor Charles C. Fulton on 28 March 1882. Albert W. Bradey purchased the Fulton corner stores of his father and Smallwood, operating it until his death in a house fire at the age of 90.

In 1839, Heinrich Iager purchased 108 acres (44 ha) of farmland expanding to 185 acres (75 ha)s forming Maple Lawn Farms. In 1938, the farm began its current free-range turkey operations under the "Sho-Nuf" brand name. The farm was nationally recognized in 2004 for the registered Holsteins used in its dairy operations. The Ellsworth Iager farm took advantage of cheap POW labor through 1945.

In the late 1990s, Fulton sat between the heavily developed areas of eastern Howard County, with water and sewer service, and the preserved western areas which used well water. Developer Greenebaum & Rose Associates proposed a dense 1,168-unit mixed use project for a portion of the 506-acre (205 ha) farm. In January 1998, Councilman Darrell Drown felt that the zoning would take only a night or two, and accommodated the developer with expedited hearings. The first phase of zoning faced multiple contentious votes and 32 record-length hearings between pro-development and rural supporters.

In 2013, the Howard County Department of Planning and Zoning sought to expand water and sewer service so that the remaining Maple Lawn property could be developed at maximum density. A 7,000-person referendum attempt was launched and suppressed by the landowners' attorney, William Erskine, who sits on the economic development agency as well as the same law firm as County Executive Ken Ulman's father.

Historic local places of worship include Grace Community Church, St. Francis of Assisi Catholic Church, and St. Paul's Lutheran Church, which was built in the 1870s by a group of mostly German families after originally meeting in each other's homes since the 1860s.

== Geography ==
Fulton is located in southern Howard County, bordered on the south by the Patuxent River and on the east by U.S. Route 29. The community of Scaggsville is to the east across US 29, and the Montgomery County community of Burtonsville is to the south across the Patuxent. Maryland Route 216 (Scaggsville Road) is the main east–west road through Fulton, which passes through nearby North Laurel and then the city of Laurel in Prince George's County. Downtown Baltimore is 21 miles (34 km) to the northeast on Interstate 95, and downtown Washington, D.C. is 19 miles (31 km) to the south. Columbia is 5 miles (8 km) to the north on US 29.

== Demographics ==
Historical population
Census	Pop.	Note	%±
2010	2,049		—
2020	5,916		188.7%
U.S. Decennial Census

=== 2020 census ===
As of the 2020 census, Fulton had a population of 5,916. The median age was 37.9 years. 31.2% of residents were under the age of 18 and 9.6% of residents were 65 years of age or older. For every 100 females there were 92.6 males, and for every 100 females age 18 and over there were 89.5 males age 18 and over.

93.5% of residents lived in urban areas, while 6.5% lived in rural areas.

There were 1,943 households in Fulton, of which 51.0% had children under the age of 18 living in them. Of all households, 65.9% were married-couple households, 10.6% were households with a male householder and no spouse or partner present, and 20.2% were households with a female householder and no spouse or partner present. About 16.0% of all households were made up of individuals and 4.5% had someone living alone who was 65 years of age or older.

There were 2,020 housing units, of which 3.8% were vacant. The homeowner vacancy rate was 0.3% and the rental vacancy rate was 9.5%.

Racial composition as of the 2020 census
Race	Number	Percent
White	2,911	49.2%
Black or African American	816	13.8%
American Indian and Alaska Native	13	0.2%
Asian	1,523	25.7%
Native Hawaiian and Other Pacific Islander	8	0.1%
Some other race	100	1.7%
Two or more races	545	9.2%
Hispanic or Latino (of any race)	284	4.8%

=== 2010 census ===
As of the 2010 census, there were 2,049 people living in Fulton, of whom 70.96% are White, 14.84% Asian, 9.03% African American, 0.29% Native American, 0.54% other races, and 4.34% who consider themselves two or more races. Hispanic or Latino of any race made up 2.54% of Fulton's population. Of the population, 27.48% is under the age 18, 61.44% are 18–64, and 11.08% are above the age of 65.

=== Income and housing estimates ===
From 2008 to 2012 Fulton's median household income was $182,039 and median house value was $682,600.

== Transportation ==
Howard County has planned an extension of Montgomery County's Flash BRT bus system to Maple Lawn and the Johns Hopkins University Applied Physics Laboratory by summer of 2026.

== Fulton today ==
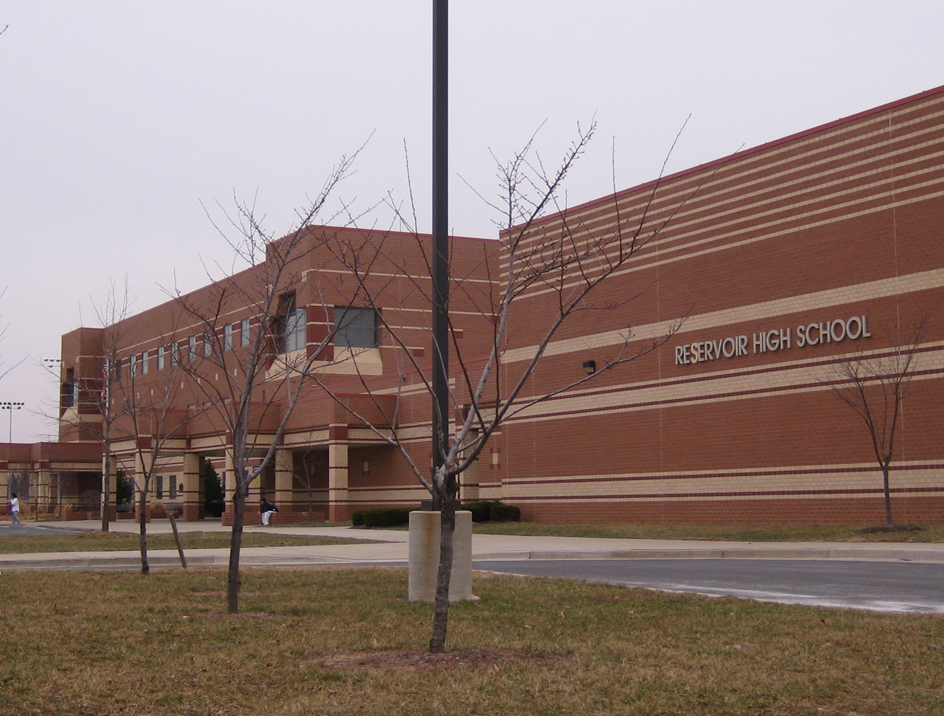
Reservoir High School

The community is served by area codes 240, 301, 410, 443, and 667, and by ZIP codes 20759 and 20723.

Reservoir High School, Lime Kiln Middle School, Fulton Elementary School and Cedar Lane School are all located in Fulton.

Located in Fulton are a post office, shops, stores, restaurants and several gas stations. Adjacent to the northeast border of Fulton is the Johns Hopkins University Applied Physics Laboratory.

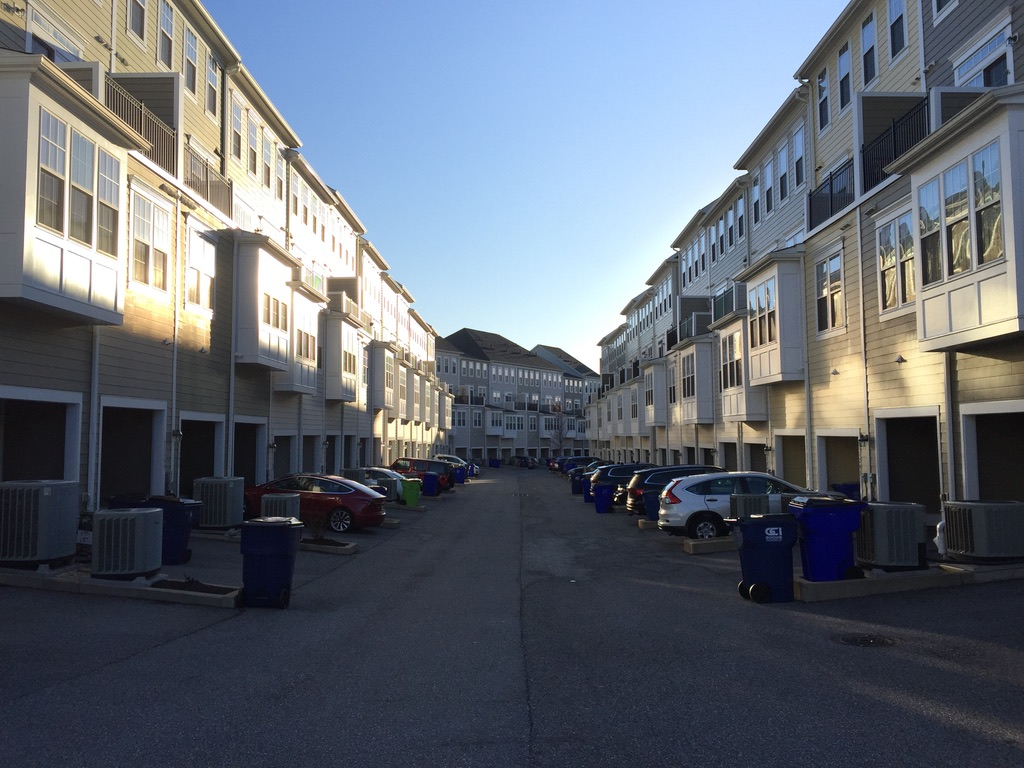
Residential Alley in the Midtown District

Maple Lawn, a mixed residential and commercial community which started in 2004/2005, was developed by Greenebaum & Rose Associates and has brought a "Main Street"-style shopping districts. Four large office buildings house a number of corporate tenants. Additional businesses are located in the residential section of Maple Lawn.

== Notable people ==
- Colin Bonner, soccer player
- Angela H. Brodie, biochemist
- Greg Hawkes, keyboardist for The Cars

== See also ==
- Snell's Bridge
- Waters-Fulton Store and Post Office
