= Bankruptcy of Penn Central =

Largest bankruptcy in U.S. history in 1970

American railroad company Penn Central Transportation Company declared bankruptcy on June 21, 1970, two and a half years after its formation by the merger of the New York Central Railroad and the Pennsylvania Railroad. At the time, this was the largest bankruptcy in American history. Penn Central was responsible for a third of the nation's passenger trains and much of the freight rail in the Northeastern United States, and its failure would have devastating impacts on the Northeast's economy.

Factors leading to the bankruptcy included incompatible corporate cultures among the merger partners, excessive and duplicative rail assets, the departure of industries from the Rust Belt, and the Interstate Commerce Commission–mandated absorption of the bankrupt New York, New Haven and Hartford Railroad at the end of 1968.

Along with other failed railroads in the Northeast, Penn Central was absorbed by government-formed Conrail in 1976, with a mandate to profitably operate the assets of its bankrupt predecessors. Redundant or unprofitable assets were abandoned or sold, and Conrail succeeded in turning a profit.

== Background ==
The Penn Central merger combined two historical rivals with incompatible corporate cultures.

Northeastern United States railroads New York Central Railroad and Pennsylvania Railroad decided to merge in the early 1960s, with both companies' stockholders voting in favor of a merger on May 8, 1962. Despite their long history of rivalry and direct competition, and both companies maintaining profitability, the economic conditions of the 1960s convinced both railroads that they needed to merge to survive. Both the NYC and the PRR stressed at Interstate Commerce Commission hearings that without merging, they would be unable to continue profitable operations and, in the words of New York Central president Alfred E. Perlman, "their ability to compete ... [would] continue to decline to the point of ineffectiveness".

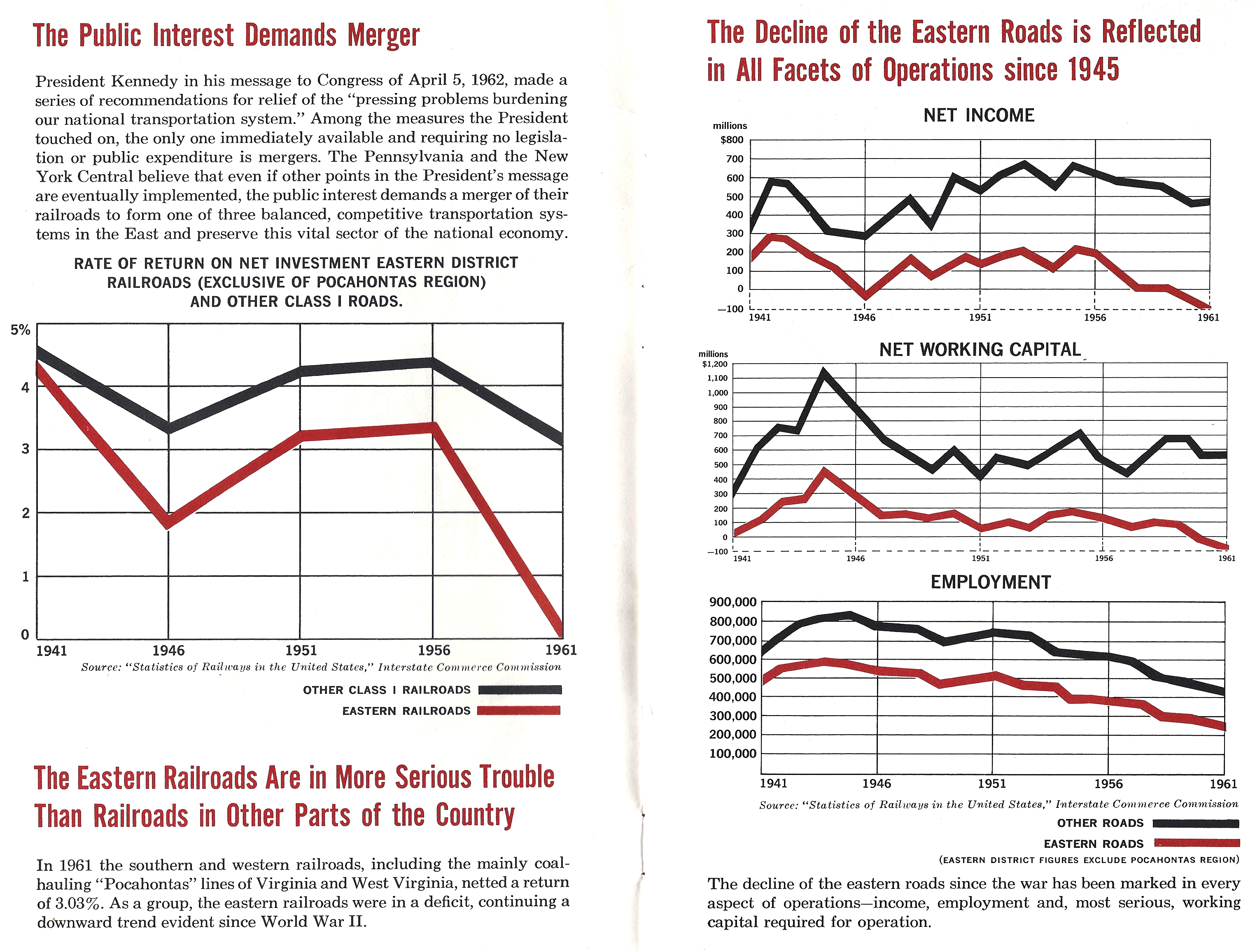
The two railroads proclaimed the alternative to merger was failure of both companies.

== Beginnings of Penn Central ==
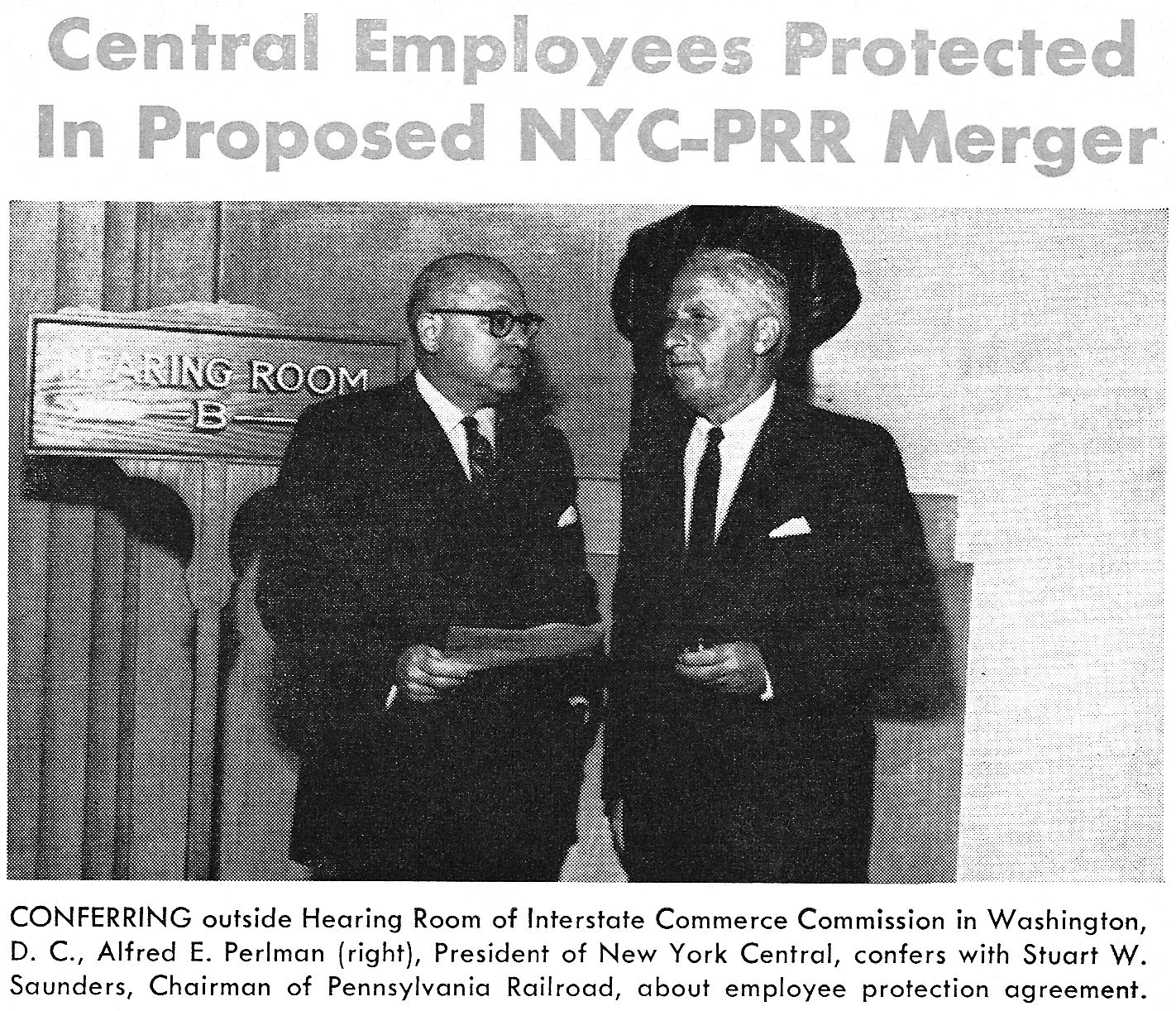
Alfred E. Perlman and Stuart W. Saunders were Penn Central's first executives, and quickly became enemies.

The Penn Central Company came into existence on February 1, 1968, with the Pennsylvania Railroad absorbing the New York Central and adopting the new name, which was subsequently changed to the Penn Central Transportation Company on October 1, 1969. From the beginning, issues complicated the new company. The forward-looking NYC leadership, which had worked to build a modern railroad and included many younger people, clashed with the traditionalist Pennsylvania Railroad management. When it became clear that the PRR management style would be continued by Penn Central, disaffected NYC employees jumped to other companies. Even Penn Central's executives could not work together—chairman of the board Stuart Saunders, from the PRR, allegedly referred to president Alfred E. Perlman from the NYC as "the worst enemy I've ever had in my life; he's cost me untold millions of dollars."

As traditional rivals that competed for the same traffic, the PRR and NYC had duplicate routes between the same markets. Sufficient freight traffic once existed to justify operating all of these lines, but the deindustrialization trends gripping the Rust Belt meant this was no longer true. These underutilized lines still cost the company money in maintenance and property taxes. In a retrospective article in 2023, author George Drury summarized the situation by saying, "The PC merger was like a late-in-life marriage to which each partner brings a house, a summer cottage, two cars, and several complete sets of china and glassware—plus car payments and mortgages on the houses."

For its first year, Penn Central posted a modest loss of $2.8 million. Unfortunately for the company, its losses grew exponentially, such that 1969 saw a loss of close to $83 million, and the railroad closed out 1970 with nearly $326 million ($2.03 billion in 2024) in deficit.

== Bankruptcy ==
Penn Central's only hope of avoiding bankruptcy was government intervention, and the Nixon administration had contemplated a $200 million bailout via the Defense Production Act, reassigning funding intended for the United States Navy—this was to be followed by a $750 million general bailout for troubled railroads. This ran into opposition among the United States Congress, and the United States Department of Transportation refused to go along with the larger bailout, forcing the plan to be scrapped. Left with no alternatives, Penn Central declared bankruptcy on June 21, 1970.

== Government intervention ==
The United States Railway Association developed its Final System Plan in 1975, identifying which former Penn Central and other bankrupt railroad lines would be taken over.

The federal government was ultimately forced to intervene out of economic necessity and in response to public demand. Penn Central was responsible for extensive intercity and commuter passenger train service, and despite industrial decline also carried significant quantities of freight. One of the first interventions was the formation of government-controlled Amtrak on May 1, 1971, which relieved Penn Central of the responsibility to operate unprofitable intercity passenger services.

In 1974, the Penn Central reorganization court came to the conclusion that Penn Central was impossible to reorganize. Under the authority of the Regional Rail Reorganization Act of 1973, the government created the United States Railway Association with a mandate to develop a comprehensive plan to preserve rail transportation in the Northeast. The USRA responded with its Final System Plan, which created a government-owned railroad called the Consolidated Rail Corporation, or Conrail, which was to absorb much of Penn Central's rail assets, plus those of six other bankrupt railroads. The new company began operations on April 1, 1976. Where possible, Conrail sold off rail lines to other, profitable railroads, and abandoned lines that had no hope of economic viability.

== Legacy ==
Despite the Conrail takeover, Penn Central continued to exist, though it was no longer running trains. The revived Penn Central Corporation held significant real estate assets, ranging from the oil industry to hotels and amusement parks, along with more than 5,000 miles (8,000 km) of former rail lines not included in Conrail or sold to other companies. Penn Central Corporation evolved into a financial services company and renamed to American Premier Underwriters in 1994.

Conrail was jointly purchased by eastern railroads CSX Transportation and Norfolk Southern Railway in 1999, with three shared assets areas operated by Conrail Shared Assets Operations, a subsidiary of CSX and NS.
