= National Register of Historic Places listings in Howard County, Maryland =

Location of Howard County in Maryland

This is a list of the National Register of Historic Places listings in Howard County, Maryland.

This is intended to be a complete list of the properties and districts on the National Register of Historic Places in Howard County, Maryland, United States. Latitude and longitude coordinates are provided for many National Register properties and districts; these locations may be seen together in a map.

There are 46 properties and districts listed on the National Register in the county, including 4 National Historic Landmarks.

Contents: Counties in Maryland
Allegany - Anne Arundel - Baltimore (city) - Baltimore County - Calvert - Caroline - Carroll - Cecil - Charles - Dorchester - Frederick - Garrett - Harford - Howard - Kent - Montgomery - Prince George's - Queen Anne's - Somerset - St. Mary's - Talbot - Washington - Wicomico - Worcester

This National Park Service list is complete through NPS recent listings posted September 25, 2026.

== Current listings ==
	Name on the Register	Image	Date listed	Location	City or town	Description
1	Commodore Joshua Barney House	Commodore Joshua Barney House	August 25, 1978 (#78001470)	North of Savage at 7912 Savage-Guilford Rd. 39°09′17″N 76°49′54″W	Savage	
2	Bollman Suspension and Trussed Bridge	Bollman Suspension and Trussed Bridge	October 18, 1972 (#72000582)	Spanning the Little Patuxent River near the junction of Gorman Rd. and Foundry St. 39°08′05″N 76°49′31″W	Savage	
3	Brick House on the Pike	Brick House on the Pike	January 11, 1996 (#95001522)	9465 Baltimore National Pike; 39°16′45″N 76°50′38″W	Ellicott City	
4	Burleigh	Burleigh	November 30, 1982 (#82001596)	3950 White Rose Way; 39°15′45″N 76°52′04″W	Ellicott City	Also known as Burleigh Manor
5	Carrollton Hall	Carrollton Hall	December 16, 2014 (#14001042)	12280 Folly Quarter Rd. 39°15′22″N 76°56′14″W	Ellicott City	Now part of the Shrine of St. Anthony.
6	Cherry Grove, HO-1	Cherry Grove, HO-1	June 21, 2007 (#07000567)	2937 Jennings Chapel Rd. 39°17′39″N 77°05′38″W	Woodbine	
7	Christ Church Guilford	Christ Church Guilford	January 30, 1978 (#78001469)	North of Guilford at 6800 Oakland Mills Rd. 39°11′04″N 76°49′41″W	Columbia	
8	Curtis-Shipley Farmstead	Curtis-Shipley Farmstead	December 12, 2006 (#06001127)	5771 Waterloo Rd. 39°12′53″N 76°48′03″W	Ellicott City	
9	Daniels Mill	Daniels Mill	April 11, 1973 (#73000929)	Daniels Rd. 39°19′02″N 76°48′47″W	Daniels	
10	Dorsey Hall	Dorsey Hall	December 28, 2001 (#01001374)	5100 Dorsey Hall Dr. 39°14′43″N 76°50′05″W	Columbia	
11	Doughoregan Manor	Doughoregan Manor	November 11, 1971 (#71000376)	8 miles west of Ellicott City on Manor Lane; 39°16′37″N 76°53′25″W	Ellicott City	
12	Elkridge Furnace Complex	Elkridge Furnace Complex	June 28, 1990 (#90000635)	5730 and 5741-5745 Furnace Ave., 5735 Race Rd. 39°12′47″N 76°42′12″W	Elkridge	
13	Ellicott City Historic District	Ellicott City Historic District	July 31, 1978 (#78001467)	Maryland Route 144; 39°16′11″N 76°48′00″W	Ellicott City	
14	Ellicott City Station	Ellicott City Station	November 24, 1968 (#68000025)	South of the Patapsco River Bridge; 39°16′02″N 76°47′43″W	Ellicott City	
15	Elmonte	Elmonte	August 25, 1978 (#78001468)	9095 Furrow Avenue; 39°18′28″N 76°49′25″W	Ellicott City	
16	Enniscorthy	Enniscorthy	May 8, 1986 (#86001019)	3412 Folly Quarter Rd. 39°16′42″N 76°54′12″W	Ellicott City	
17	Forest View	Forest View	December 12, 2017 (#100001894)	1805 Marriottsville Rd. 39°19′14″N 76°53′54″W	Marriottsville vicinity	
18	Gary Memorial United Methodist Church		September 29, 2026 (#100013450)	2029 Daniels Rd; 39°18′56″N 76°48′55″W	Ellicott City	
19	Glenelg Manor	Glenelg Manor	February 3, 1983 (#83002952)	Southeast of Glenelg at 12793 Folly Quarter Road; 39°15′06″N 76°57′41″W	Glenelg	
20	Granite Park		November 13, 2025 (#100008653)	7608 Murray Hill Rd. 39°09′50″N 76°51′01″W	Columbia vicinity	
21	Guilford Quarry Pratt Through Truss Bridge	Guilford Quarry Pratt Through Truss Bridge	June 2, 2021 (#100006648)	Jct. of Guilford Rd. and MD 32; 39°09′56″N 76°50′27″W	Guilford	
22	Hobson's Choice	Hobson's Choice	September 13, 1984 (#84001802)	3145 Florence Rd. 39°18′24″N 77°05′32″W	Woodbine	
23	Howard Lodge	Howard Lodge	October 9, 2012 (#12000845)	12301 Howard Lodge Rd. 39°20′14″N 76°56′23″W	Sykesville vicinity	
24	The Lawn	The Lawn	October 29, 1984 (#84000412)	6036 Old Lawyers Hill Rd. 39°13′16″N 76°43′09″W	Elkridge	
25	Lawyers Hill Historic District	Lawyers Hill Historic District	September 23, 1993 (#93001000)	Area surrounding Lawyers Hill and Old Lawyers Hill Rds. and Elibank Dr. 39°13′12″N 76°43′53″W	Elkridge	
26	Linnwood	Linnwood	December 12, 2006 (#06001126)	2327 Daniels Rd. 39°18′27″N 76°48′23″W	Ellicott City	
27	MacAlpine	MacAlpine	December 23, 2004 (#04001382)	3621 Macalpine Rd. 39°16′15″N 76°49′46″W	Ellicott City	
28	Montrose	Montrose	December 13, 2000 (#00001506)	13370 Brighton Dam Rd. 39°12′04″N 76°58′39″W	Clarksville	
29	Oakdale	Oakdale	December 16, 2014 (#14001041)	16449 Ed Warfield Rd. 39°17′19″N 77°04′56″W	Woodbine	
30	Oakland Mills Blacksmith House and Shop	Oakland Mills Blacksmith House and Shop	November 18, 2011 (#11000820)	5471 Old Columbia Pike; 39°13′17″N 76°50′51″W	Columbia	
31	Old National Pike Milestones	Old National Pike Milestones	November 27, 1975 (#75002107)	U.S. Route 40, Alternate U.S. Route 40, and Scenic U.S. Route 40, and Maryland Routes 44 and 165; 39°25′13″N 77°16′01″W	Lisbon	
32	Patterson Viaduct Ruins	Patterson Viaduct Ruins	June 3, 1976 (#76002221)	South of Catonsville at the Patapsco River; 39°15′00″N 76°45′51″W	Ilchester	
33	Richland Farm	Richland Farm	March 26, 2008 (#08000217)	4730 Sheppard Ln. 39°14′40″N 76°56′45″W	Clarksville	
34	Roberts Inn	Roberts Inn	August 2, 2006 (#06000661)	14610 Frederick Rd. 39°19′27″N 77°01′12″W	Cooksville	
35	Round About Hills	Round About Hills	November 20, 2008 (#08001072)	15505 Cattail Oaks; 39°16′00″N 77°02′10″W	Glenwood	
36	Savage Mill	Savage Mill	April 18, 1974 (#74002251)	Southwestern corner of Foundry Rd. and Washington St. 39°08′07″N 76°49′37″W	Savage	
37	Savage Mill Historic District	Savage Mill Historic District	February 20, 1975 (#75000905)	North of the Little Patuxent River off U.S. Route 1; 39°08′12″N 76°49′38″W	Savage	
38	Sykesville Bypass Bridge	Sykesville Bypass Bridge	December 6, 2024 (#100011131)	MD 32 Bridge over River Road, the South Branch of the Patapsco River, and CSX Railroad; 39°21′44″N 76°58′01″W	Sykesville	
39	Temora	Temora	April 30, 1976 (#76001003)	4252 Columbia Rd. 39°15′14″N 76°49′28″W	Ellicott City	
40	Thomas Viaduct, Baltimore & Ohio Railroad	Thomas Viaduct, Baltimore & Ohio Railroad	October 15, 1966 (#66000388)	Over the Patapsco River between Relay and Elkridge; 39°13′19″N 76°42′49″W	Relay	
41	Trinity Church	Trinity Church	May 6, 1974 (#74000957)	7474 Washington Boulevard; 39°10′48″N 76°46′13″W	Elkridge	
42	Troy	Troy	June 22, 1979 (#79001137)	Interstate 95 and Maryland Route 176 (6500 Mansion Lane); 39°11′44″N 76°45′42″W	Elkridge	
43	Union Chapel	Union Chapel	March 17, 1975 (#75000904)	1 mile north of Glenwood on Maryland Route 97; 39°17′45″N 77°01′31″W	Glenwood	
44	Waverley	Waverley	October 18, 1974 (#74000958)	2335 Marriottsville Road; 39°18′06″N 76°53′55″W	Marriottsville	
45	White Hall	White Hall	August 12, 1977 (#77000698)	West of Ellicott City at 4130 Chatham Rd. 39°15′29″N 76°50′12″W	Ellicott City	
46	Woodlawn	Woodlawn	February 3, 1983 (#83002953)	9254 Old Annapolis Rd. 39°14′05″N 76°49′33″W	Columbia	

== See also ==
- List of National Historic Landmarks in Maryland
- National Register of Historic Places listings in Maryland
