= Troy Park =

Park in Elkridge, Maryland

- Interactive map of Troy Park
- Type: County
- Location: 6500 Mansion Lane; Elkridge, Maryland
- Coordinates: 39.195°N 76.759°W
- Area: 101-acre (0.41 km^{2})
- Created: 2014
- Operator: Howard County
- Status: Open; Ongoing Construction Official website

Troy Park is a regional park comprising 101 acres in Elkridge, Maryland. The park is located at 6500 Mansion Lane off Washington Boulevard, near the intersection of Maryland Route 100 and I-95.

Troy Park currently features several athletic fields, a playground, and trails. Once completed, the park will include pathways, comfort stations, an indoor sports complex, a community center, and a newly renovated Troy Mansion. All phases of the park's construction are expected to be finished by 2018.

== History ==
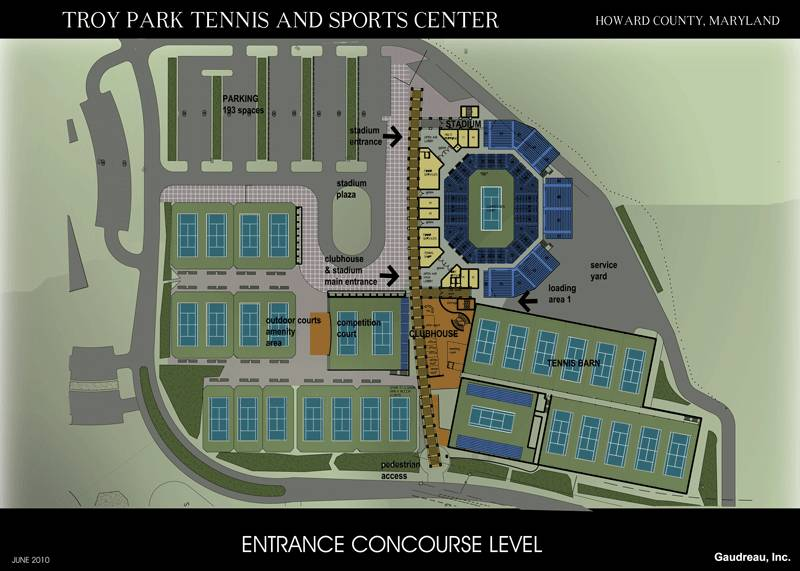
Troy Park Layout

The lands of "Troy" were surveyed by Hon John Dorsey in 1694, where he moved in 1696 with 2 slaves. The property stayed in the family though his great-grandson Col. Thomas Dorsey (-1790) of the American Revolution whose estate sold it in 1808. Troy was inherited by Basil Dorsey in 1714, followed by Caleb Dorsey who reduced the land to 1016 acres which was split into two unequal parts in 1760 and given to Sarah Dorsey and Thomas Dorsey. Thomas Dorsey would use the root cellar as a meeting place with Benjamin Warfield of Cherry Grove during the revolutionary war. Thomas's widow Elizabeth split Troy several times to pay debts. Vincent Bailey acquired 652 acres including Troy for $6,520. A stone house named "Troy Hill" was built about 1808 on the foundation of an earlier Dorsey house by Vincent Baily and is representative of the late Georgian style in Maryland architecture. The 2 1/2-story fieldstone house is three bays wide and two deep. Outbuildings included a stone barn, smokehouse and dairy. Situated on a hill, the fieldstone basement is unusually large with four rooms.

An 1830 fire destroyed the original wood paneling. In 1880, the house was modified with cottage styling. In 1942, the house was modified again into a "Colonial Revival" style. Further modification occurred by owner Pedro De Valle. Donald Doll was the last resident before the state purchased the property on 16 December 1958 to destroy it to make way for the I-95 project. The house was left in a state of purposeful neglect until Howard County purchased the stripped house and 52 surrounding acres in September 1971 for $67,500. In 1978, Howard County proposed to build an interpretative gardening center at the house. In 1989, the state offered a $350,000 matching grant for renovation, but a spring 1991 fire gutted the building before it was spent.

Howard County purchased 80 of the 101 acres with $2.1 million from the Department of Natural Resources Program Open Space. In 2011 the county began developing plans for the park and it held a construction groundbreaking on June 22, 2013. Once the park opened, it became the eighth regional park in Howard County, and the second regional park in Elkridge after Rockburn Branch Park.

== See also ==
- Patapsco Valley State Park
- Belmont Manor and Historic Park
- Rockburn Branch Park
