= Rockburn Branch Park =

Park in Elkridge, Maryland

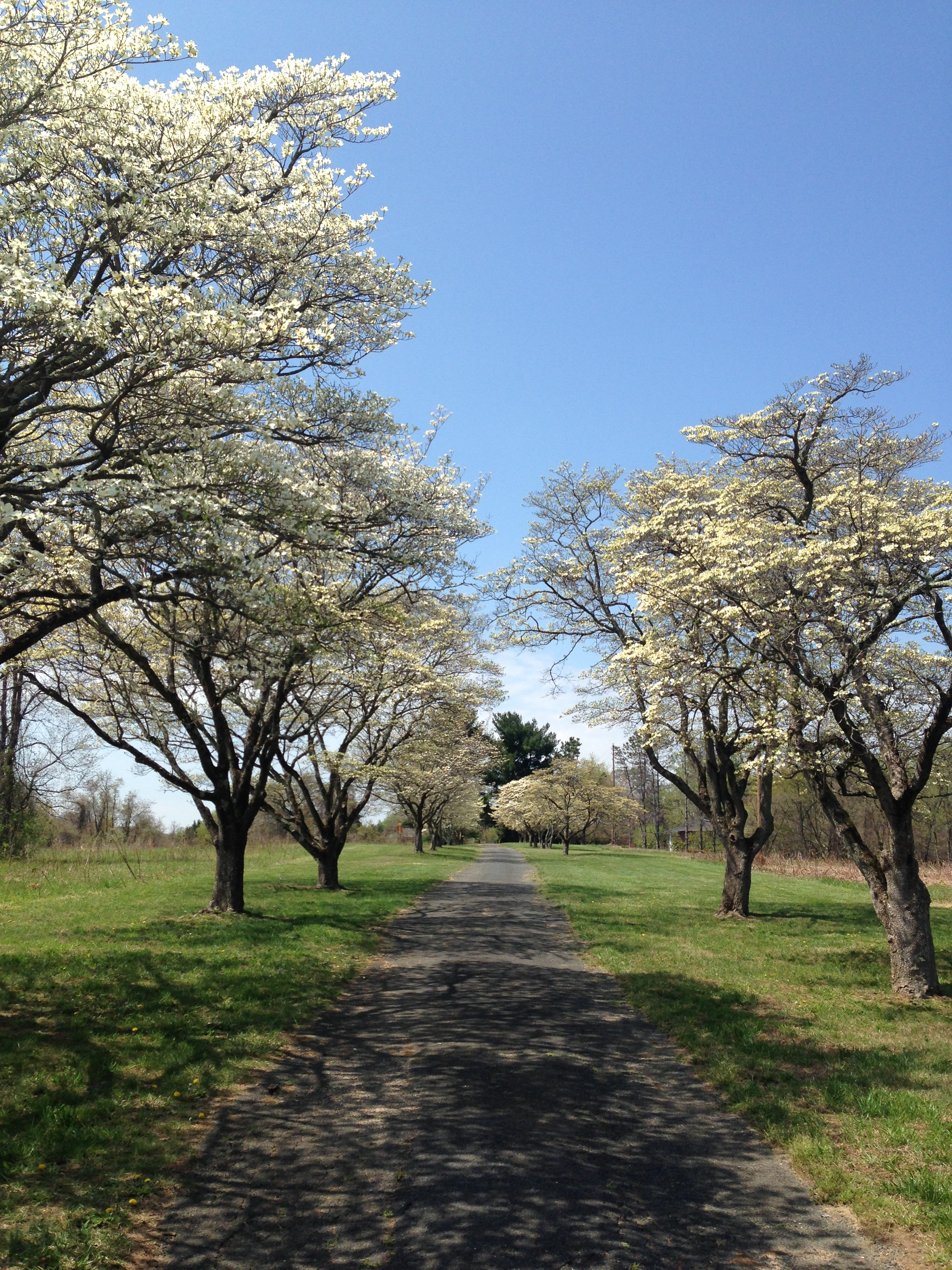
- Interactive map of Rockburn Branch Park
- Type: County
- Location: Elkridge, Maryland
- Coordinates: 39.219°N 76.763°W
- Area: 450-acre (1.8 km^{2})
- Created: 1996
- Operator: Howard County
- Status: Open Official website

Rockburn Branch Park is a local park in Elkridge, Maryland that follows the Rockburn Branch, a tributary of the Patapsco River. The park features 7.4 miles of trails, 10 ball diamonds, 2 turf fields, 4 smaller fields, along with tennis and basketball courts. The park is also home to the Pfeiffers Corner Schoolhouse, Clover Hill Historic House, and Rockburn Elementary School.

== History ==
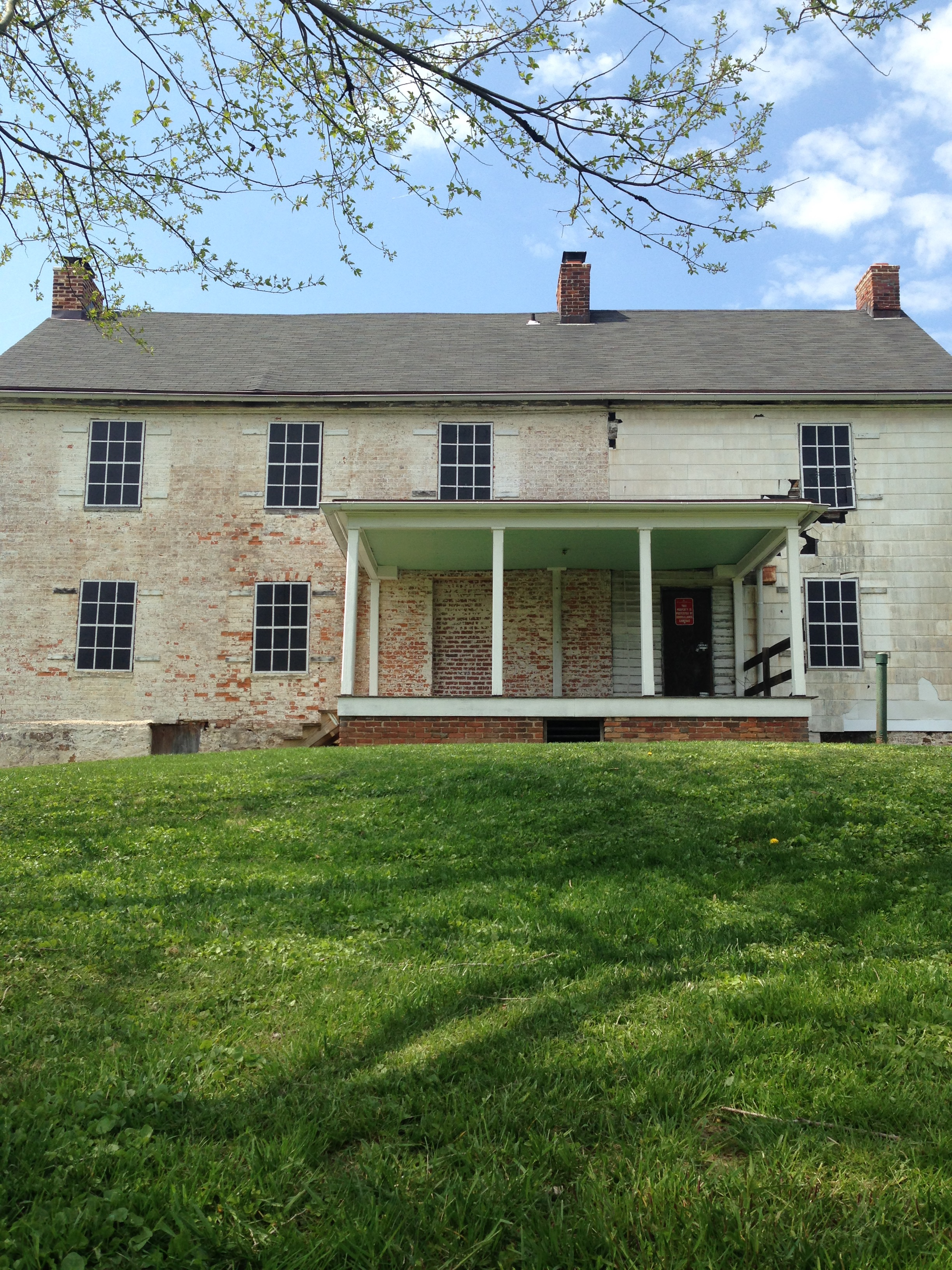
Clover Hill.

The park was established in 1975, when the original parcel of land was "sold" to Howard County for $5. The deed of this property stated "The above-described property may not be converted from outdoor public recreation or open space use to any other use without the prior written approval of the Secretary of Natural Resources and the Secretary of the Department of State Planning, or their successors." The property Owner wanted the park protected with this language. Later, in 1979 Howard County bought another piece of land directly next to the original parcel for approximately $525,000.00 and effectively bridging the connection to Patapsco Valley State Park.

In September 2001 the oldest structure in Howard County was moved to the park from Warfield's Range in North Laurel to accommodate development. The log cabin built in 1696 was destroyed by arson after two weeks onsite.

On September 29, 2004, Pfeiffers Corner Schoolhouse was dedicated on Rockburn Branch Park Road across from the elementary school. The 1883 schoolhouse was relocated to the site, and is used for town hall meetings and historical purposes. The fields of the park are used for local sports teams such as the Elkridge Youth Organization and the youth football league, the Elkridge Hurricanes.

Future plans for the park call for the restoration of Clover Hill Historic House into an events center, similar to that of Blandair and Belmont Estate.

As of 2017, a debate regarding the location of a new county high school has led some to suggest the park as the most viable location. County Executive Allan H. Kittleman and a member of the Howard County Council have announced their opposition to this proposal.
