= Pfeiffers Corner, Maryland =

Unincorporated community in Maryland, United States

- Location within Maryland Location within the United States
- Coordinates: 39°12′22″N 76°47′50″W
- Country: United States of America
- State: Maryland
- County: Howard
- Time zone: UTC-5 (Eastern (EST))
  - Summer (DST): UTC-4 (EDT)

Pfeiffers Corner is an unincorporated area located in Howard County in the state of Maryland, United States. The community straddles the border between the census-designated places of Columbia and Ilchester.

The postal community is home to the prominent Pfeiffer family, who owned Troy Hill. The 1895 Pfeiffers Corner Schoolhouse was converted to a private home, then moved to Rockburn Park.
