= Belmont Estate =

Historic estate located at Elkridge, Howard County, Maryland, United States

Belmont Manor and Historic Park
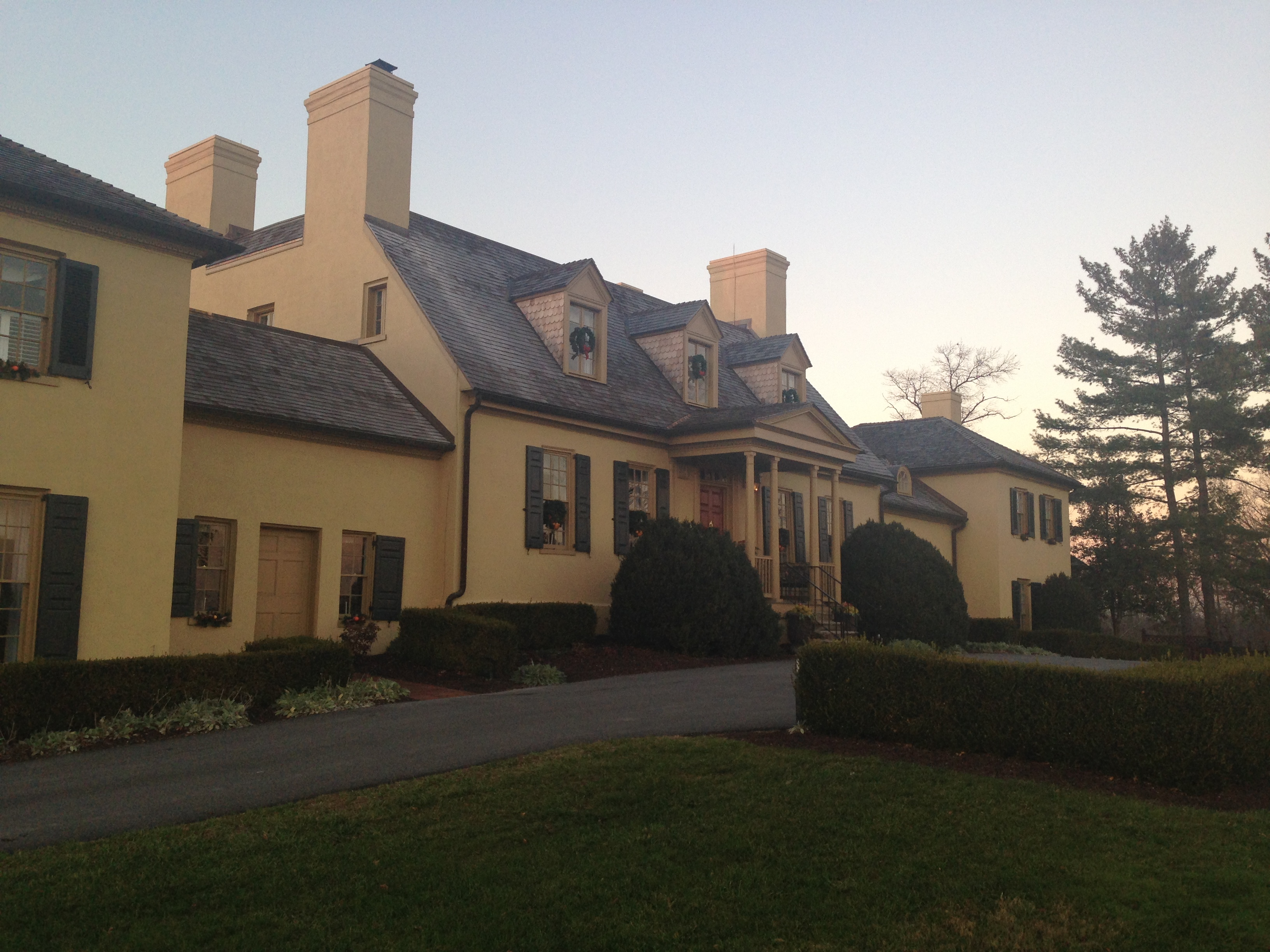
- Interactive map of Belmont Manor and Historic Park
- Type: County
- Location: Elkridge, Maryland
- Area: 68-acre (0.28 km^{2})
- Created: April 11, 2015
- Operator: Howard County
- Status: Open
- Website: Official website; Howard County website
- Belmont Estate
- U.S. Historic district – Contributing property
- Location within Maryland Location within the United States
- Nearest city: Elkridge, Maryland
- Coordinates: 39°13′12″N 76°43′53″W
- Built: 1730
- Architect: Multiple
- Architectural style: Queen Anne, Georgian, Gothic Revival
- Part of: Lawyers Hill Historic District (ID93001000)
- Added to NRHP: September 23, 1993

The Belmont Estate, now Belmont Manor and Historic Park, is a former plantation located at Elkridge, Howard County, Maryland, United States. Founded in the 1730s and known in the Colonial period as "Moore's Morning Choice", it was one of the earliest forced-labor farms in Howard County, Maryland. Its 1738 plantation house is one of the finest examples of Colonial Georgian architectural style in Maryland.

From the late 17th century until 1962, the property was privately owned and associated with important personages from the late 17th century to the 20th century, including Dr. Mordecai Moore, Caleb Dorsey, Alexander Contee Hanson, and David K. E. Bruce.

The property was then successively owned and maintained as the Belmont Conference Center, by the Smithsonian Institution, the American Chemical Society, and Howard Community College. It is now the 68-acre Belmont Manor and Historic Park, owned by Howard County and its Department of Recreation and Parks. It adjoins Patapsco Valley State Park. Facilities on the estate include the Belmont Manor House, a carriage house, a cottage, a large barn, formal gardens, a pond, and an aqua garden.

It is listed on the Maryland Historic Trust (MHT), Inventory of Historic Properties (MIHP), and is on the National Register of Historic Places (NRHP) as part of the Lawyers Hill Historic District, Elkridge, Maryland.

== History ==
=== 17th–19th century ===
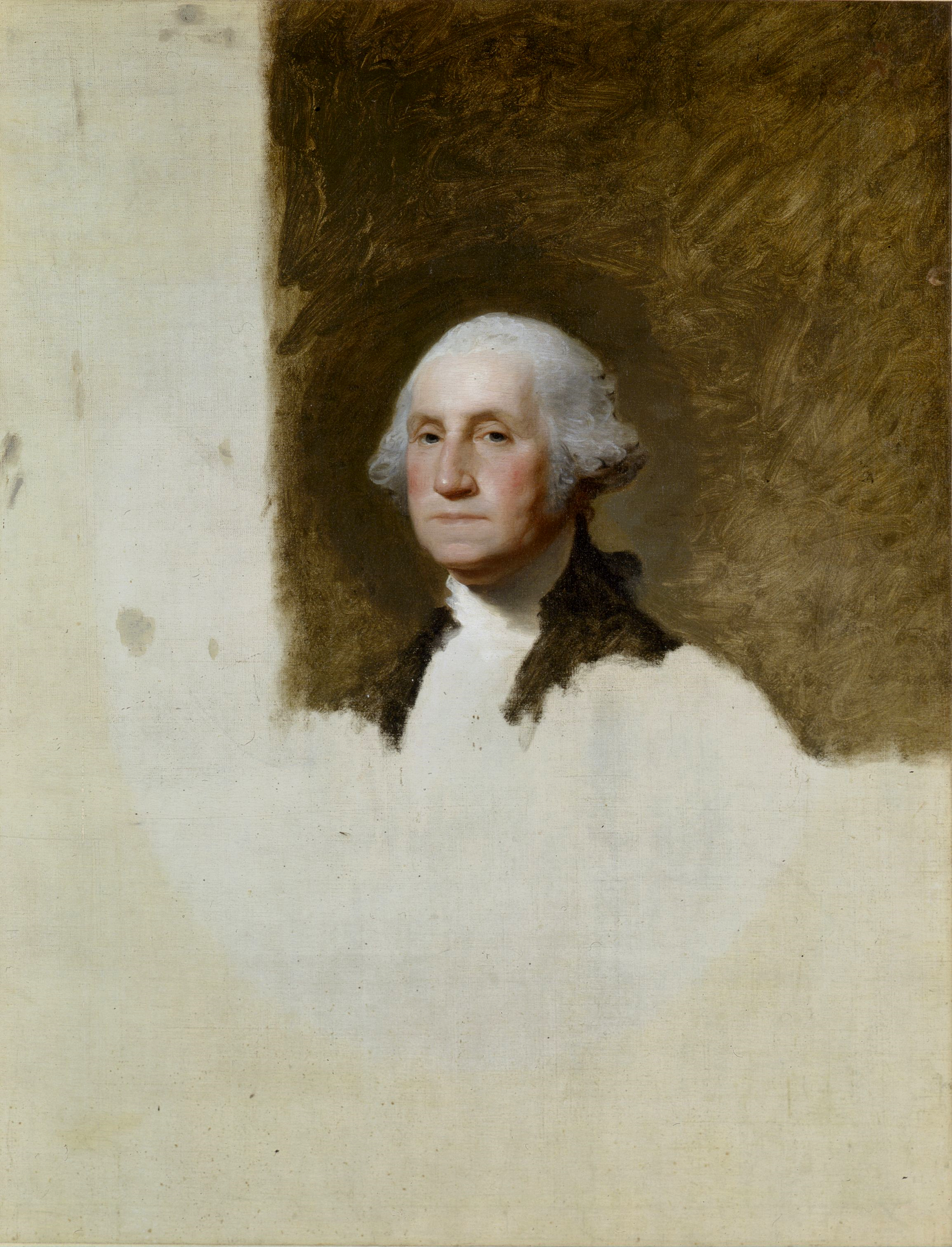
An original reproduction of George Washington painted by Gilbert Stuart hung in the mansion for over a hundred years.

Dr. Mordecai Moore, who helped found the Society of Friends in Maryland, received a tract of 1,368 or 1,662 acres of land granted by King William III's 1695 land patent. The tract, called Moore's Morning Choice, sat on a ridge above Elkridge Landing with views of the lower Patapsco River Valley.

About 1735, this land and an adjoining tract called Rockburn were purchased by Caleb Dorsey (1710–1772), of Hockley-in-the-Hole on the Severn River, an early industrialist and farmer. Dorsey operated forges and iron furnaces along the Patapsco River, near Elkridge. Dorsey and his sons Edward and Caleb, Jr., used up to 94 slaves to work the land for cash crops. Rockburn was constructed by Edward Dorsey about 1736, followed by his brother Caleb Dorsey, Jr. who built a house in 1738 he dubbed "Belmont". A pig iron forge was operated onsite along with nearby forges at Avalon and Hockley in a Hole. Caleb Dorsey and his wife Pricilla Hill (died 1781) were buried at Belmont. Caleb Dorsey Jr.'s son Edward inherited the property and took over the enslavement of the Black people there. Edward later gave the property to his daughter, Priscilla, the wife of Alexander Contee Hanson, a United States senator.

After the American Civil War, Belmont became the social center of a new wealthy elite, notably the many lawyers who built homes at "Lawyer's Hill" near the Belmont property. From 1873 to his death in 1880, Charles Grosvenor Hanson allowed the house to fall into neglect following the death of his wife. An original reproduction portrait of George Washington painted by Gilbert Stuart in 1794 or 1795 hung in the mansion for a century and was sold in 1913 by the Hanson family to a New York collector for $15,000 to $20,000. Howard Bruce, who bought the house in 1918, was the last owner to use it as a private residence.

=== Belmont Conference Center ===
==== Smithsonian Institution (1962–1982) ====
In 1962, Belmont was owned by David K. E. Bruce, former ambassador to Britain, France and Germany. He sold the property for $500,000 and then donated Belmont and 339 acres to the Smithsonian Institution for $5.00 as a philanthropic gift. The Smithsonian Institution maintained the property as a conference center.

The Belmont Conference Center was established in 1964 and was in almost continuous operation until 2010. Belmont hosted numerous conferences, social gatherings, weddings, meetings, and other functions. Examples of the numerous academic, government, and non-profit conferences held at Belmont include:

- In 1967, a conference entitled "Bibliography and the historian: the conference at Belmont of the Joint Committee on Bibliographical Services to History"
- In February 1976, a four-day conference on the use of Human Subjects for Research took place at the Belmont Conference Center. The Belmont Report, resulting partly from this conference, was published in 1979.

==== American Chemical Society (1982–2004) ====
In 1982, The Smithsonian Institution sold the Belmont Conference Center and the majority of the center's surrounding land to the American Chemical Society for $2 million (~$5.48 million in 2024). The American Chemical Society continued to maintain the property as a conference center.

The John Clare Society of North America held their first international John Clare Conference at the Belmont Conference Center on March 21–22, 2003. The Society is a non-profit literary organization devoted to the study, preservation, and publication of the works of English poet John Clare.

==== Howard Community College (2004–2012) ====
In 2004, the American Chemical Society sold the Belmont Estate to Howard Community College (HCC) for $5.2 million (~$8.25 million in 2024), funded in part by a $2.6 million loan from the government of Howard County. The college used it for culinary classes and continued to operate the Belmont Conference Center.

On September 30, 2010, Howard Community College announced that it could no longer afford to maintain and operate the Belmont Estate, due to the effects of the economic recession. The government of Howard County, whose loan terms included the right of first refusal, conducted from September 2011 to May 2012 a detailed study of the feasibility of purchasing and operating the property for public purposes.

=== Belmont Manor and Historic Park ===
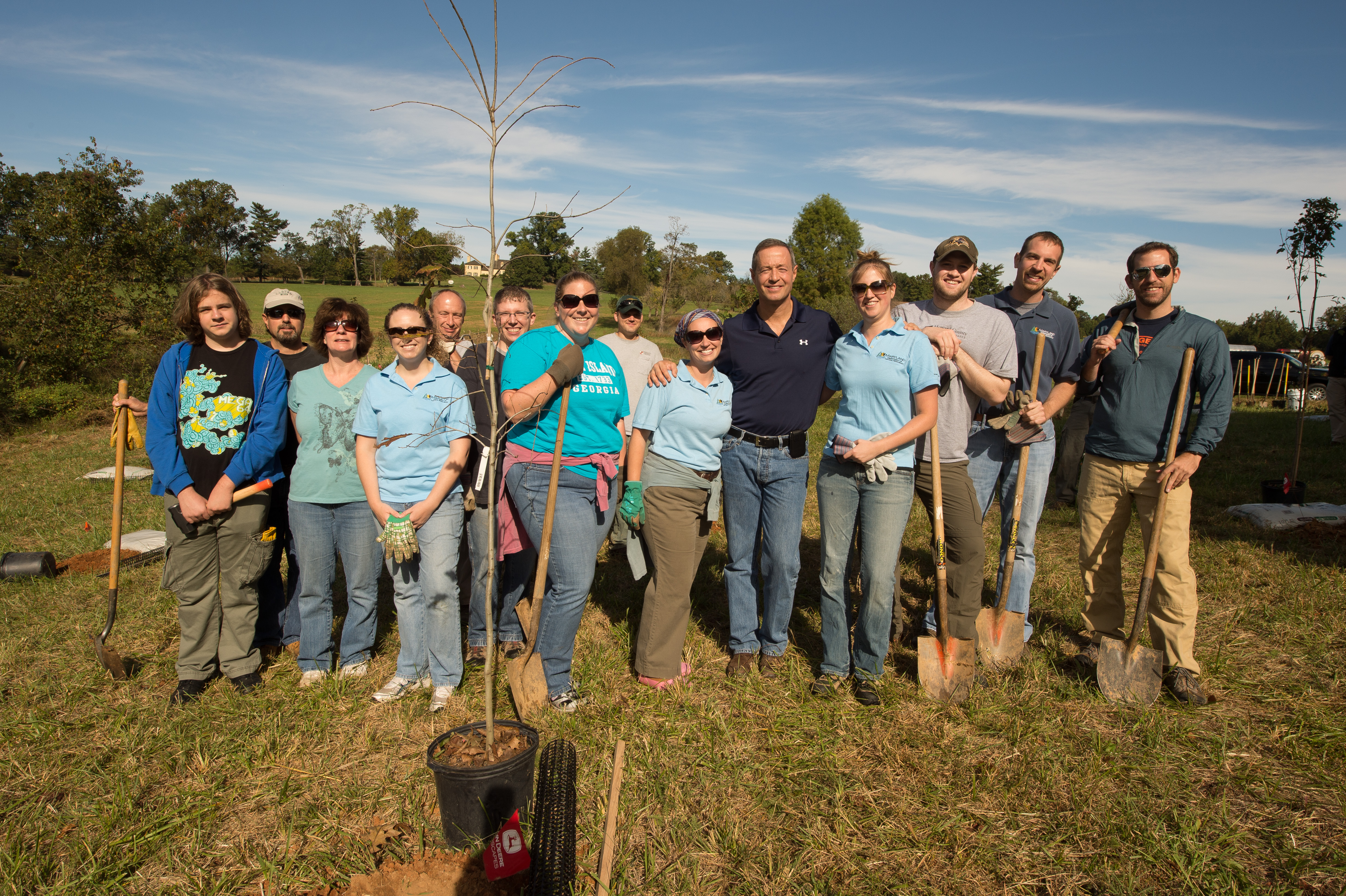
Day of Service Tree Planting in 2012 at Belmont with Governor Martin O'Malley

On May 30, 2012, Howard County Executive Kenneth Ulman announced that the county would buy the Belmont Estate from the college in exchange for forgiving the $2.6 million debt and $89,000 in cash. The sale closed on June 21, 2012. The county government also sold 13 acres of the land to developers, retaining 68 acres of the original property.

In a radio interview on June 29, 2012, Kenneth Ulman said that the Belmont Estate would complement other Howard County nature attractions, including the Howard County Conservancy, located in Woodstock, Maryland, on a 300-year-old, 232-acre farm; and the James and Anne Robinson Nature Center, located in Columbia, Maryland, on 18 acres of land adjacent to the Middle Patuxent Environmental Area.

Howard County subsequently established Belmont Manor and Historic Park in summer/fall 2012. The park is operated by the county's Department of Recreation and Parks, to be used as a conference center and a site for weddings, private parties, and environmental education programs. The Manor opened for public operations in April 2015.

== Historic preservation ==
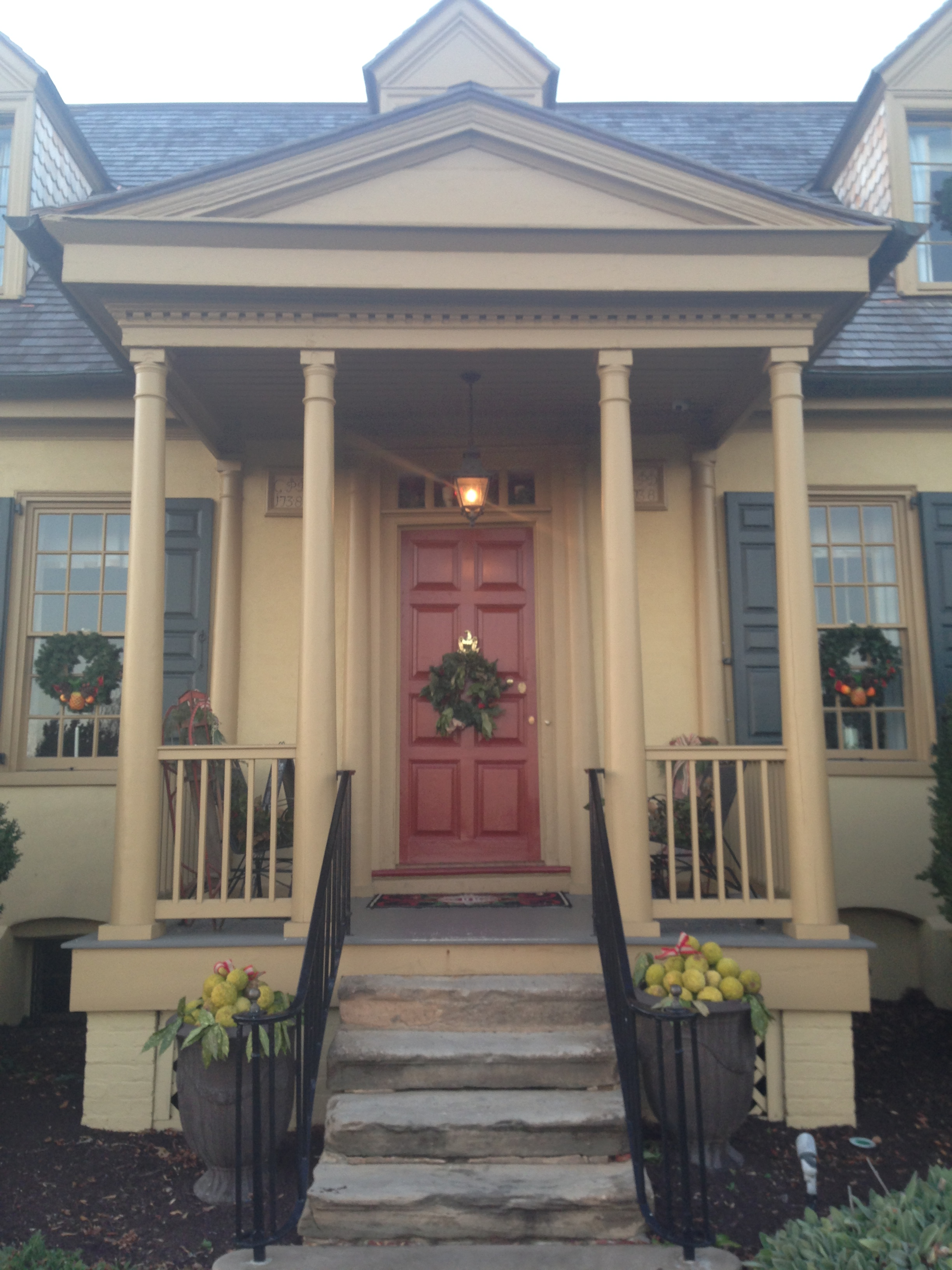
The front entrance of the mansion, decorated for the holiday season

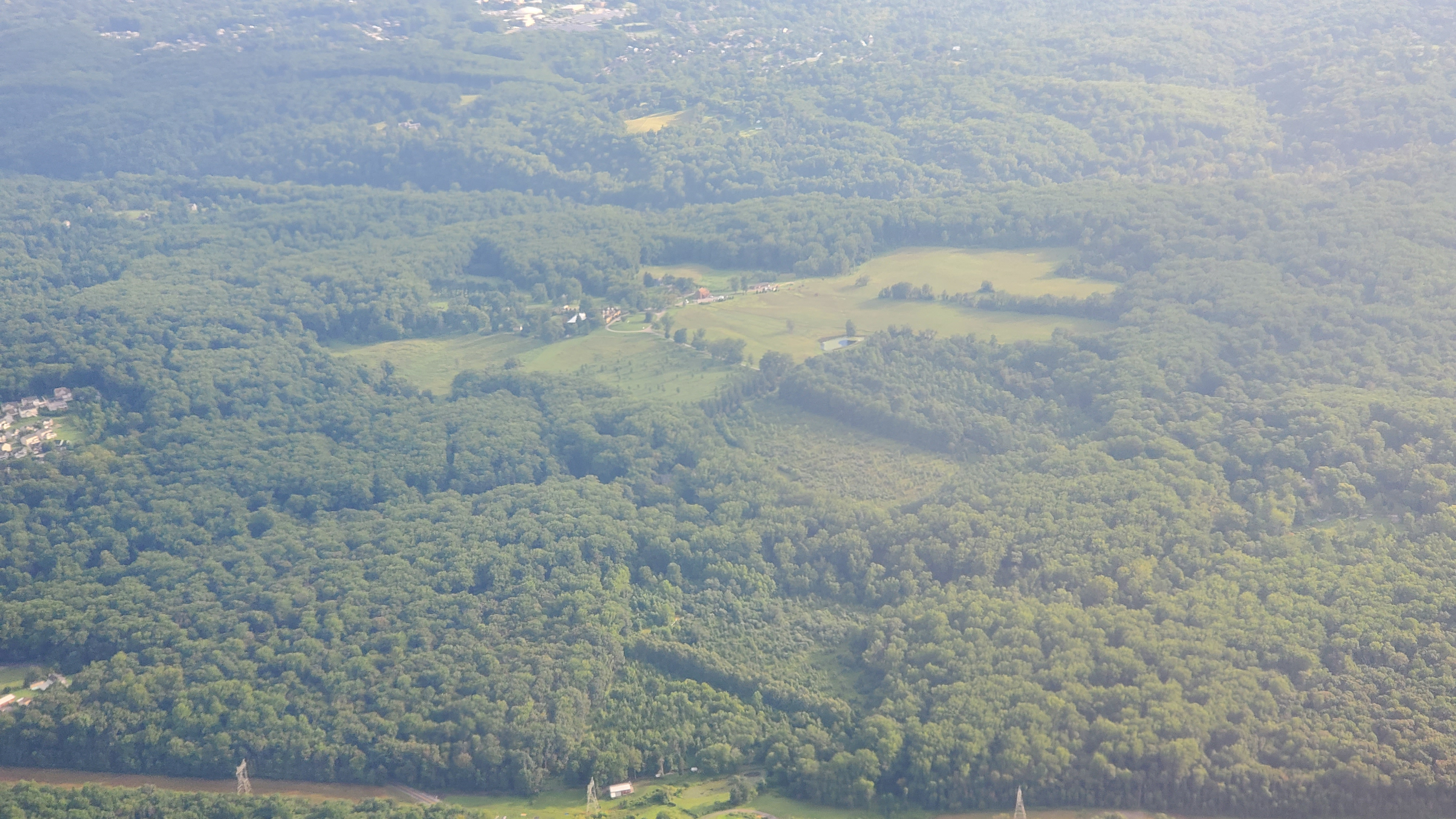
Aerial view of the property, looking north

A number of organizations have played an important role in promoting, and advocating for, the historic preservation of the Belmont Estate. These include the Rockburn Land Trust, the Save Belmont Coalition, Preservation Howard County, Preservation Maryland, the Maryland Environmental Trust, the Friends of Patapsco Valley & Heritage Greenway, Inc, and the Land Trust Alliance.

Preservation Howard County's president, Fred Dorsey, a descendant of the original owners of the estate, has said that because of its experience, the county is the rightful owner to provide stewardship of the historic property. Maintenance issues are some of the challenges, including maintaining the exterior that had been coated with lead paint.

== Historic designations ==
The original historic site nomination for Belmont was researched and prepared in the mid-1970s for the Maryland Historical Trust (MHT). Further research and updates by Howard County and the State of Maryland were carried out in 2010.

The Belmont Manor House and Estate are included on the U.S. National Register of Historic Places (NRHP), as part of the Lawyers Hill Historic District in Elkridge, Maryland, which was added to the NRHP on September 23, 1993.

== See also ==
- List of Howard County properties in the Maryland Historical Trust
- Doughoregan Manor, another colonial era manor in Howard County, Maryland
