= Vernon Lee Clark =

Convicted American serial killer

- Born: December 28, 1955; Elkridge, Maryland, U.S.
- Died: August 12, 2025 (aged 69)
- Convictions: First degree murder (4 counts); Assault with intent to commit rape
- Penalty: Life imprisonment

Details
- Victims: 4–6+
- Span of crimes: 1980–1989
- Country: United States
- State: Maryland
- Date apprehended: January 26, 1990

Vernon Lee Clark (December 28, 1955 – August 12, 2025) was an American serial killer who sexually assaulted and murdered at least four women in the Greater Baltimore area during the 1980s. For his known crimes, he was sentenced to multiple terms of life imprisonment, and remains a suspect in several cold cases.

== Early life ==
Vernon Lee Clark was born on December 28, 1955, in Elkridge, Maryland. He attended Elkridge Elementary School, then Waterloo Middle School, and finally Howard High. Clark was known by friends and acquaintances as getting into trouble at school and with the law in his teen years, and usually kept to himself. His criminal tendencies followed him to adulthood, and was convicted of crimes including drug possession, burglary, and assault. In the early 1980s, he found a job as an animal skinner and worked on the side as a day laborer. He also worked for a short period of time at C & S Faulkner inc.

== Murders ==
Clark's first victim was Rebecca H. "Dolly" Davis, a 70-year-old woman from Elkridge. Born in 1909, Davis attended Bryn Mawr College in Philadelphia and graduated with a Bachelor of Arts degree in 1932. She later taught art at The Baldwin School in Bryn Mawr, Pennsylvania. At the same time, she studied painting at the Pennsylvania Academy of Fine Arts. In 1937, Davis traveled to Europe to visit art museums. She returned to the United States a year later, and moved to Baltimore.

In 1941, Davis stopped painting, as she believed it did not feel appropriate during wartime. At some point in the 1970s, Clark began to do yard work for Davis. On February 16, 1980, Clark attacked Davis with a knife outside her home. He sexually assaulted her and stabbed her to death, and later hid her body in the woods behind her home. A week later, her body was found. The discovery of her body led to women in the area becoming fearful that the killer would strike again, and many installed deadbolt locks on their doors.

Clark would not become a suspect in the investigation, and remained free to claim more victims. On March 29, 1981, he is believed to have been doing handyman work for 68-year-old Evelyn Dieterich in Catonsville, when he attacked Dieterich, sexually assaulted, and killed her. Once again, Clark was not suspected in the killing, and would spend the next three years without committing any crime. On December 29, 1984, he broke into the roadside home of 81-year-old Iva Myrtle Watson in Ellicott City. Clark chased her into the woods before catching up, sexually assaulting, and beating Watson to death.

In 1989, Clark borrowed a shotgun from the Bruan Carroll Co. animal rendering plant where he worked. On July 4, 1989, Clark broke into the apartment of 23-year-old Kathleen Patricia Gouldin, sexually assaulted her, and then shot her to death with the gun.

== Arrest ==
While investigating Gouldin's murder, police located a pizza box outside her apartment, which contained the name of a woman Clark had been chatting with hours before Gouldin's murder. The woman told investigators that Clark took the box home along with a few slices, but by the time it was located it was empty. He was immediately considered a suspect, but at the time, no other evidence linked him to the crime, so for the time being, he remained free. Detectives learned from neighbors that they had seen someone prowling around the complex around the time Gouldin was killed. A small semen sample was collected from Gouldin's body.

Police collected a search warrant to examine Clark's home and vehicle. When they rang his doorbell and informed him of this, he punched and bit the officers. For this, he was jailed on assault charges from August 9 to September 22. While incarcerated, his DNA was taken and stored in the crime lab. In January 1990, Gouldin's family members and community members offered a reward of $6,000 for information leading to an arrest. Around this time, samples of bodily fluid and semen found on Gouldin's body were compared to Clark's DNA. When the results came back, they were proven to be a complete match, and Clark was arrested on January 26, 1990, and charged with first degree murder. After his arrest, police started to suspect him in other local murder cases that dated back to the mid-1970s, although at the time, no evidence could be located to prove this.

== Trial and imprisonment ==
Before his trial, Clark depended on his heavy usage of drugs as a defense. He stated on the night of Gouldin's murder, he had been doing drugs with prostitutes. He also attempted to use racism and discrimination as the factors that led to his arrest. When the trial came, the defense requested that Gouldin's mother should be prohibited from attending the trial as she might be called up as a witness, as all witnesses are under a sequestration order. Despite the controversy, the judge agreed.

Based on the evidence presented, on April 17, 1991, the jury found Clark guilty of murder. In August, his sentencing was delayed after an anonymous letter was mailed to the judge, in which the writer claimed that he was a witness in the murder and claimed Clark was innocent. However, Clark ended up being sentenced to life imprisonment anyway.

On March 10, 1999, DNA evidence identified Clark as the killer of Evelyn Dieterich. Following the identification, detective Keith Fisher contacted Baltimore County officials and requested similar testing done on similar cases. On August 5, 1999, Clark was charged with the murder of Rebecca Davis following another DNA test. As a result, Clark was imposed two more life sentences in 2001. Around this time, he became a suspect in Iva Watson's murder, but again, at the time he could not be identified.

In 2015, Clark was identified as Watson's killer via a DNA test, and as a result, he was given another life sentence. Clark is similarly suspected in many other murders around Howard County dating back to the mid-1970s. These include the murders of Carvel Faulkner, 58, and his wife Sara, 56, who were killed in their house in April 1979.

== See also ==
- List of serial killers in the United States
