= Marshalee (Elkridge, Maryland) =

Marshalee, Lyndwood, Markham
- Location within Maryland
- 39°20′00″N 76°45′00″W
- Nearest city: Elkridge, Maryland

History
- Built: 1845

Site notes
- Architectural style: Georgian

Marshalee Plantation, sometimes spelled as "Marshallee" or referred to as "Lyndwood" or "Markham", was a plantation located in Elkridge, Maryland in Howard County, Maryland, United States.

The plantation was the home of Rebecca Snowden and Confederate Col. Charles Marshall, the aide-de-camp to Robert E. Lee. Marshall drafted Lee's Farewell Address. Rebecca was the daughter of Col Thomas Snowden of Montpelier

== History ==
James C. Adams built the two story home on 252 acres with stone construction and stucco coating in 1845, naming it Lyndwood. The walls measured 20 inches thick. In 1876, Col. Marshall purchased the property, renaming it "Markham". Outbuildings included a log gatekeepers house. In 1902 Marshall died, passing on the property to his granddaughter. In 1939 Col. Randolph Coyle and his wife purchased the property, renaming it "Marshalee", a combination of the names of Col. Marshall and General Lee. Modern Marshalee drive in Elkridge and Ellicott City is named after the manor. The property was subdivided and reduced to 200 acres and purposefully left vacant. In 1976, the property was purchased by Joel G. Greer Jr. Properties/Marriott Corporation, who had sought to build a Baltimore-Washington corridor amusement park but were denied zoning.

The plantation house was destroyed by fire in 1978. The property has since been developed to build the "Timbers at Troy" golf course, paid for with Howard County Bonds.
