= The Lawn (Elkridge, Maryland) =

Historic house in Maryland, United States

- U.S. National Register of Historic Places
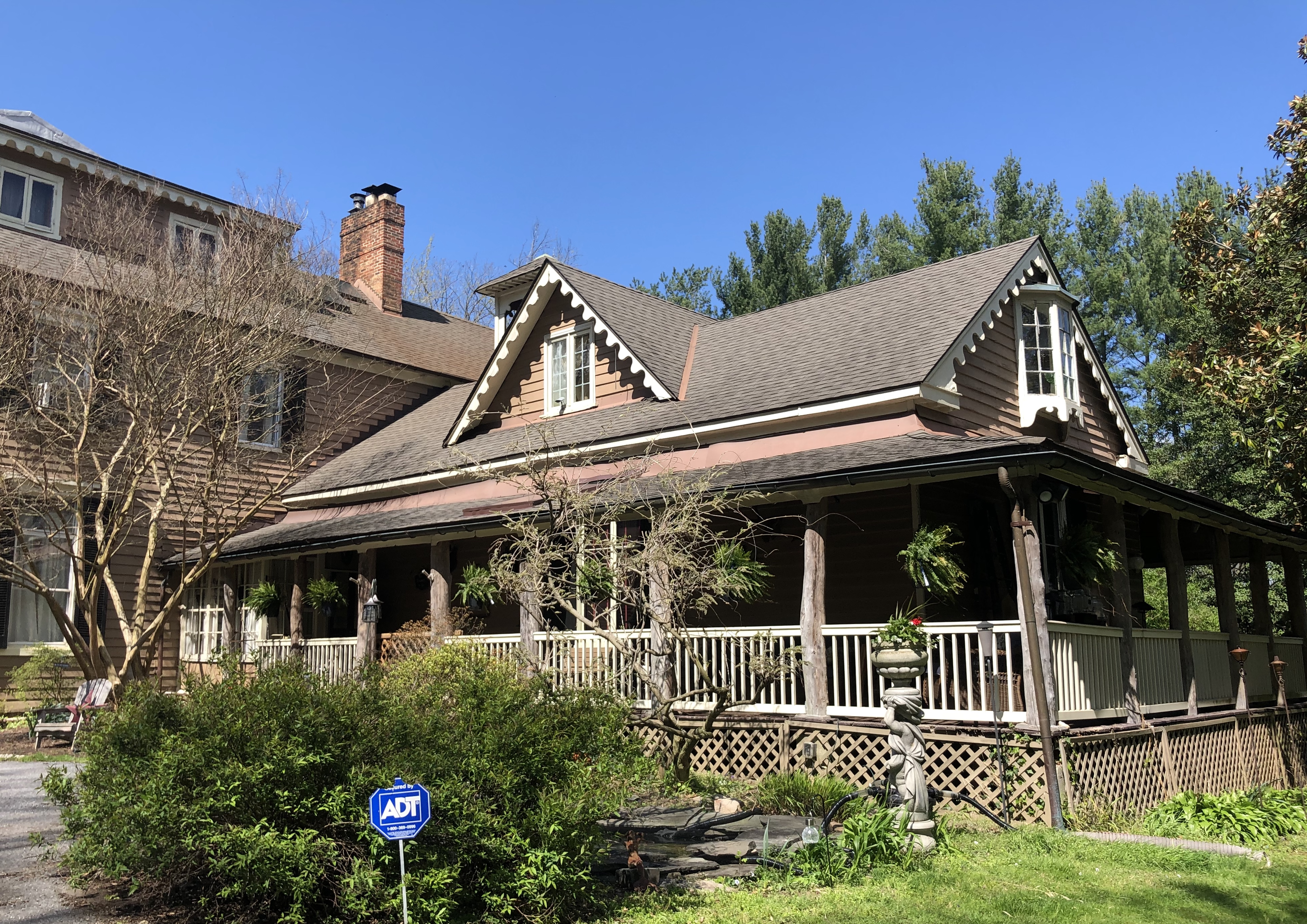

- Location within Maryland Location within the United States
- Location: 6036 Old Lawyers Hill Rd., Elkridge, Maryland
- Coordinates: 39°13′16″N 76°43′9″W
- Area: 7.9 acres (3.2 ha)
- Architectural style: Italianate, Gothic Revival
- NRHP reference No.: 84000412
- Added to NRHP: October 29, 1984

The Lawn, is a historic home located at Elkridge, Howard County, Maryland, USA. It is a 19th-century frame house built in 1835 with five outbuildings, three of which (two cottages and a barn) date from the 19th century. The house was owned by George Washington Dobbin, who built the home originally as a summer retreat. The Rouse Company commercial corridor and road is named after Dobbin.

It was listed on the National Register of Historic Places in 1984.

In 2006, The Lawn was purchased after it had been apartments for many years. Many improvements were made, such as the library room floors being raised and refinished. In 2006, The Lawn was the Howard County Decorator Show house; professional decorators came in and refinished, furnished and decorated several rooms. Both the main kitchen and the butler pantry received renovations including new cabinets and appliances. The house was restored to its original glory.

== See also ==
- List of Howard County properties in the Maryland Historical Trust
- Lawyers Hill Historic District
