= Elkridge, Maryland =

- Census-designated place
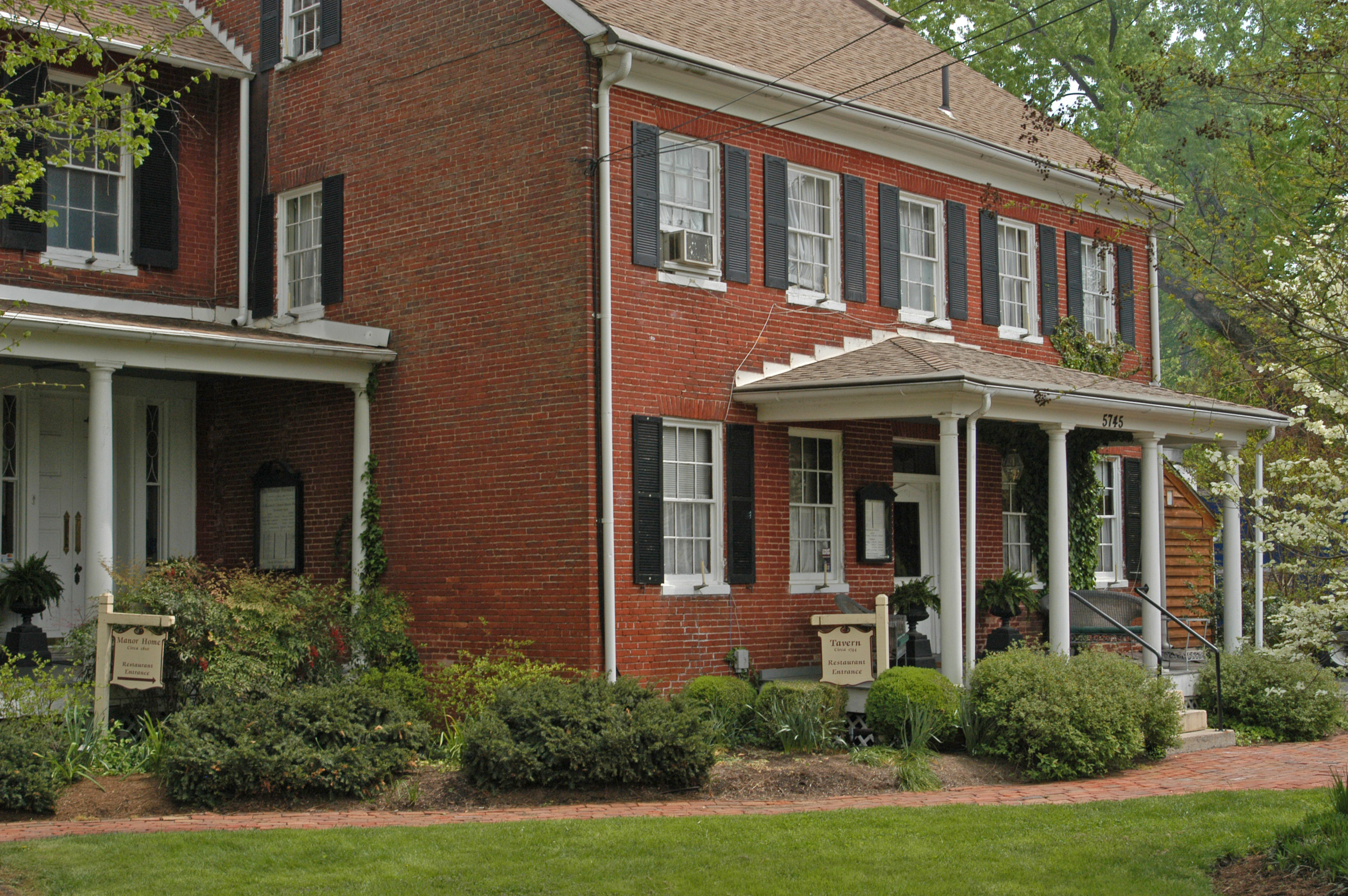
- Elkridge Furnace Inn, Furnace Avenue

- Location of Elkridge, Maryland
- Coordinates: 39°12′57″N 76°42′33″W
- Country: United States
- State: Maryland
- County: Howard
- Jansen Town: 1734
- Elk Ridge Landing: 1825
- Elk Ridge: 1884
- Elkridge: 1895

Government
  - Type: County council
  - Councilman: Elizabeth Walsh (D); District 1 (North Elkridge)

Area
  - Total: 8.37 sq mi (21.68 km^{2})
  - Land: 8.36 sq mi (21.65 km^{2})
  - Water: 0.012 sq mi (0.03 km^{2})
- Elevation: 92 ft (28 m)

Population (2020)
  - Total: 25,171
  - Density: 3,011.0/sq mi (1,162.55/km^{2})
- Time zone: UTC−5 (Eastern (EST))
  - Summer (DST): UTC−4 (EDT)
- ZIP code: 21075
- Area codes: 410 and 443
- FIPS code: 24-25750
- GNIS feature ID: 0590149
- Website: www.howardcountymd.gov

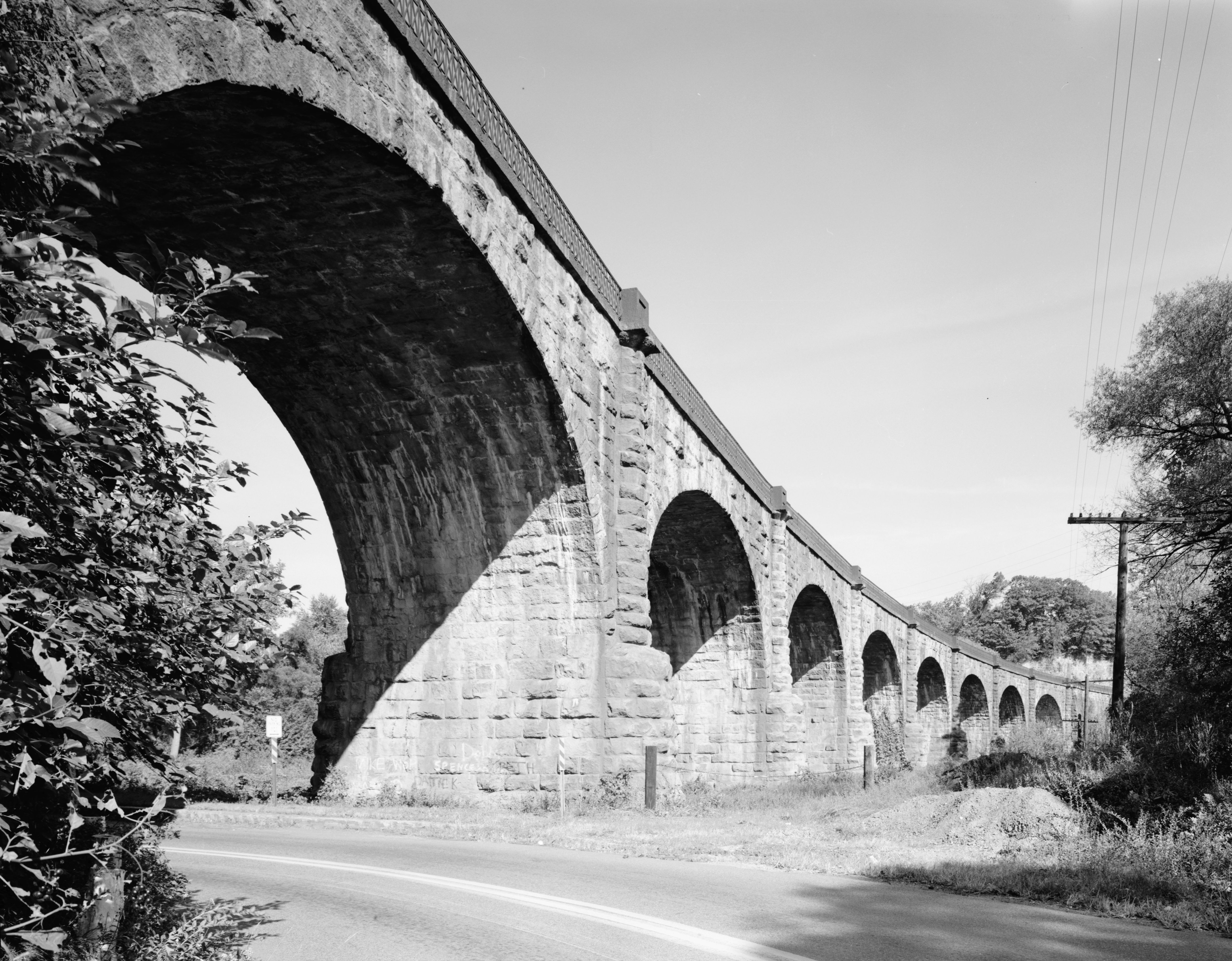
Thomas Viaduct

Elkridge is an unincorporated community and census-designated place (CDP) in Howard County, Maryland, United States. Elkridge is a rapidly growing area; between the 2010 and the 2020 census, the population had grown from 15,593 to 25,171. Founded early in the 18th century, Elkridge is adjacent to two other counties, Anne Arundel and Baltimore.

== History ==
Elkridge qualifies as the oldest settlement in its present county, when Howard was a part of Anne Arundel County. Its location on the Patapsco River was a key element in its growth. The Maryland General Assembly elected a law to erect a 30-acre (120,000 m^{2}), forty-lot town at the pre-existing settlement of Elkridge Landing to be called "Jansen Town" in 1733. In 1738 an attempt to formalize the town failed with the death of the commissioners before passage. In 1750 a second attempt to formalize the town was attempted around the lands of Phillip Hammond. By comparison, Baltimore Town consisted of only 25 dwellings at that time. A third petition was filed in 1762.

The settlement was founded as a place where planters, who each had a wharf along the river, could bring their tobacco crop to be loaded on English trading ships. Later, Elkridge Landing was built as the seaport dock for the community. In 1755 the Elkridge Furnace was founded at the Elkridge Furnace Complex, a historic iron works located on approximately 16 acres (65,000 m^{2}) and including six remaining buildings of an iron furnace which operated into the 1860s. The millrace that fed water to the furnace was filled in during the 1920s to create the current "Race Road". The Hockley Forge and Mill were created upstream in 1760. In 1781, Lafayette camped light infantry at Elkridge Landing en route to Virginia during the Revolutionary war. In 1825, Jansen Town burned, taking out all of the oldest buildings at the Landing and 9 out of 10 houses in the village. The same year, on October 12, 1825, the Elkridge Landing postal stop was created.

Elkridge has historic churches, including Melville Church on Furnace Avenue. Its original building was the first Methodist church built (1772) and was visited on the circuit rides of Francis Asbury. Saint Augustine Church, on Old Washington Road, was built in 1845 and opened its parochial school in 1870.

Elkridge had a rich history of industries, including pig-iron forging, basket weaving, paper, cotton and grist milling, as well as employment from the B&O Railroad. The Thomas Viaduct, located over Levering Avenue at the entrance to the Patapsco Valley State Park, is the oldest multiple-arched curved stone railroad bridge in the world. Built in 1833, its architect was Benjamin Latrobe, Jr. The B&O first used horse-drawn coaches in relays, hence Relay Station was added. The viaduct also carried the Tom Thumb, and the first telegraph message from Washington, D.C., stating "What hath God wrought?" was wired across.

Elkridge did not escape the Civil War. Union troops guarded the Thomas Viaduct and the thoroughfare to Baltimore with a captured Winans Steam Gun while camping on Lawyers Hill, a community of summer estates built over the years by residents such as Caleb Dorsey ("Belmont"), Baltimore City Supreme Bench Judge George Washington Dobbin ("the Lawn"), Thomas Donaldson ("Edgewood"), John Latrobe ("Fairy-Knowe"), and the Penniman family home ("Wyndhurst"). Some of these families had slaves.

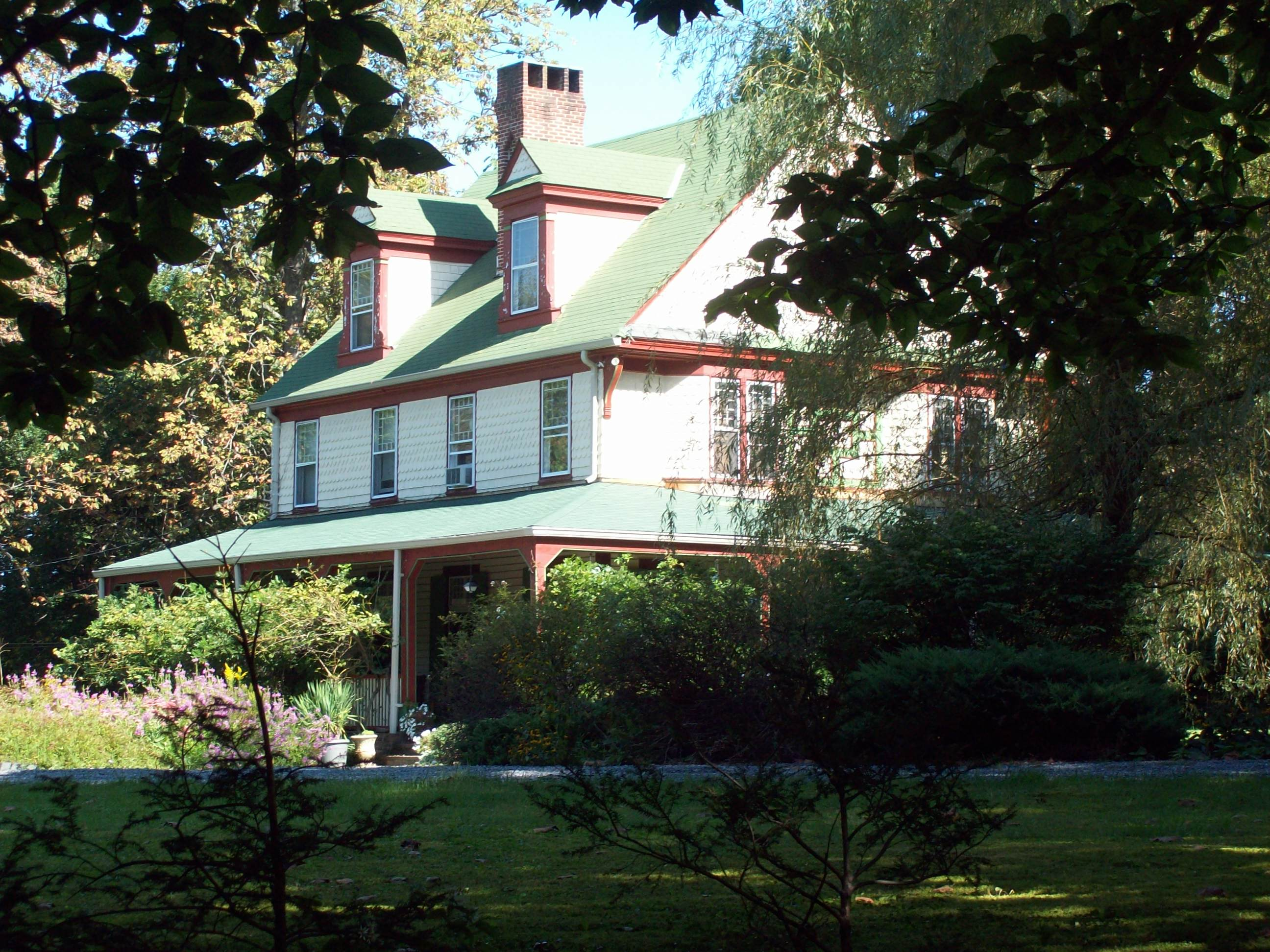
"Maycroft", a Lawyers Hill Estate.

Their estate cottages were built along the top of the Lawyers Hill, including along Old Lawyers Hill Road, on which at one corner stands the Elkridge Assembly Rooms. This community hall, built in 1871, was a neutral meeting place for entertainments for Northern and Southern sympathizers of the neighborhood and owned by them as stockholders. Neighbors did not betray neighbors and each protected others' property from advancing troops. Many homes remain, while others burned and have not been rebuilt, such Fairie Knowe in 1850 and 1900. The Lawyers Hill Historic District was listed on the National Register of Historic Places in 1993.

The Washington Turnpike Road Company built what is now Washington Boulevard between 1796 and 1812, creating a major north–south land route that is now U.S. Route 1. As automobiles became a popular alternative to rail, the corridor became the key road and commercial corridor between Baltimore and Washington. With increased travel speeds, Elkridge was the location of "Dead Man's Curve" near Ducketts Lane. In 1915, bus service was started between Elkridge and the terminal adjacent to the Montgomery Ward Warehouse and Retail Store in Baltimore.

In 1939, the Andrews Brothers opened the first mobile home park in Elkridge. In 1987, Howard County commissioned studies to develop commercial properties that were not detailed in the 1980 general plan.

== Geography ==
Elkridge is located in the eastern corner of Howard County at 39°12′7″N 76°45′1″W (39.202057, −76.750157). It is bordered to the north by Ilchester, to the northwest by Columbia, to the southwest by Jessup, to the southeast by Anne Arundel County, and to the northeast, across the Patapsco River, by Halethorpe (part of the Arbutus CDP) in Baltimore County.

According to the United States Census Bureau, the CDP has a total area of 8.4 square miles (21.8 km^{2}), of which 0.01 square miles (0.03 km^{2}), or 0.12%, is water.

== Neighborhoods ==
The following neighborhoods and communities are within the Elkridge census-designated place:

Northern Elkridge (Historic Elkridge Landing): north of Bonnie View Lane and Hanover Road to the county line.

- Augustine, surrounds Saint Augustine's Church and School
- Elkridge Heights, a historic neighborhood off of Main Street
- Lawyers Hill, a historic resort neighborhood from the 1800s
- Rockburn Hill, located off River Road near the Patapsco River.

Western Elkridge: west of I-95 and north of Maryland Route 100.

- Elibank, a remnant of Lawyers Hill that was bisected by the construction of Interstate 95. The area features estates like Belmont, Tutbury and Rockburn, along with other homes built during the 1940s along Montgomery Road.
- Landing Road, a once-farming community that is now mostly residential.
- Lyndwood, a major planned community on the site of Marshalee Estate. The community features a shopping center, business park, and the Timbers at Troy Golf Course.
- Norris Lane, another resort community settled along the B&O Railroad by Elizabeth Cromwell Norris.
- West Elkridge, an area of west Montgomery Road home to a mix of dwellings as well as Rockburn Elementary School and Rockburn Park.
- Timberview, a mid-century neighborhood with Ranch-style architecture.

Central Elkridge: east of I-95, south of Bonnie View Ln, north of Howard Ln.

- Elkridge Crossings, a Mixed-use development on the site of the former Elkridge Drive-In.
- Hunt Club, an established neighborhood where the Elkridge Hunt Club first kenneled their hounds.
- Montgomery Woods, a townhouse community along Montgomery Road adjacent to historic Gaines African Methodist Episcopal Church.
- Rowanberry, a major planned community that includes the Elkridge Library.

Southern Elkridge: south of Maryland Route 100, north of Montevideo Road, east of Waterloo Road to the county line.

- Anderson, village named after Civil War Col. Ephraim Foster Anderson
- Ducketts Lane, residential neighborhood including Ducketts Lane Elementary School
- Harwood Park, Howard County's first planned community established in 1893 by the Boston Land Improvement Company.
- Mayfield, a residential area connecting Elkridge to Columbia.
- Troy Hill, a business and industry center, as well as Troy Park.
- Wesley Grove, area that includes Route 1 industrial parks and newer developments.

== Adjacent communities ==
- Dorsey (overlaps with Anne Arundel County)
- Hanover (overlaps with Anne Arundel County)
- Ilchester (includes portions of Ellicott City and Elkridge)
- Relay (located in Baltimore County to the north)
- Saint Denis (located in Baltimore County to the north)
- Waterloo (includes portions of Elkridge and Jessup)

== Demographics ==
Historical population
Census	Pop.	Note	%±
1960	7,262		—
1970	9,613		32.4%
1980	8,008		−16.7%
1990	12,953		61.8%
2000	11,643		−10.1%
2010	15,593		33.9%
2020	25,171		61.4%

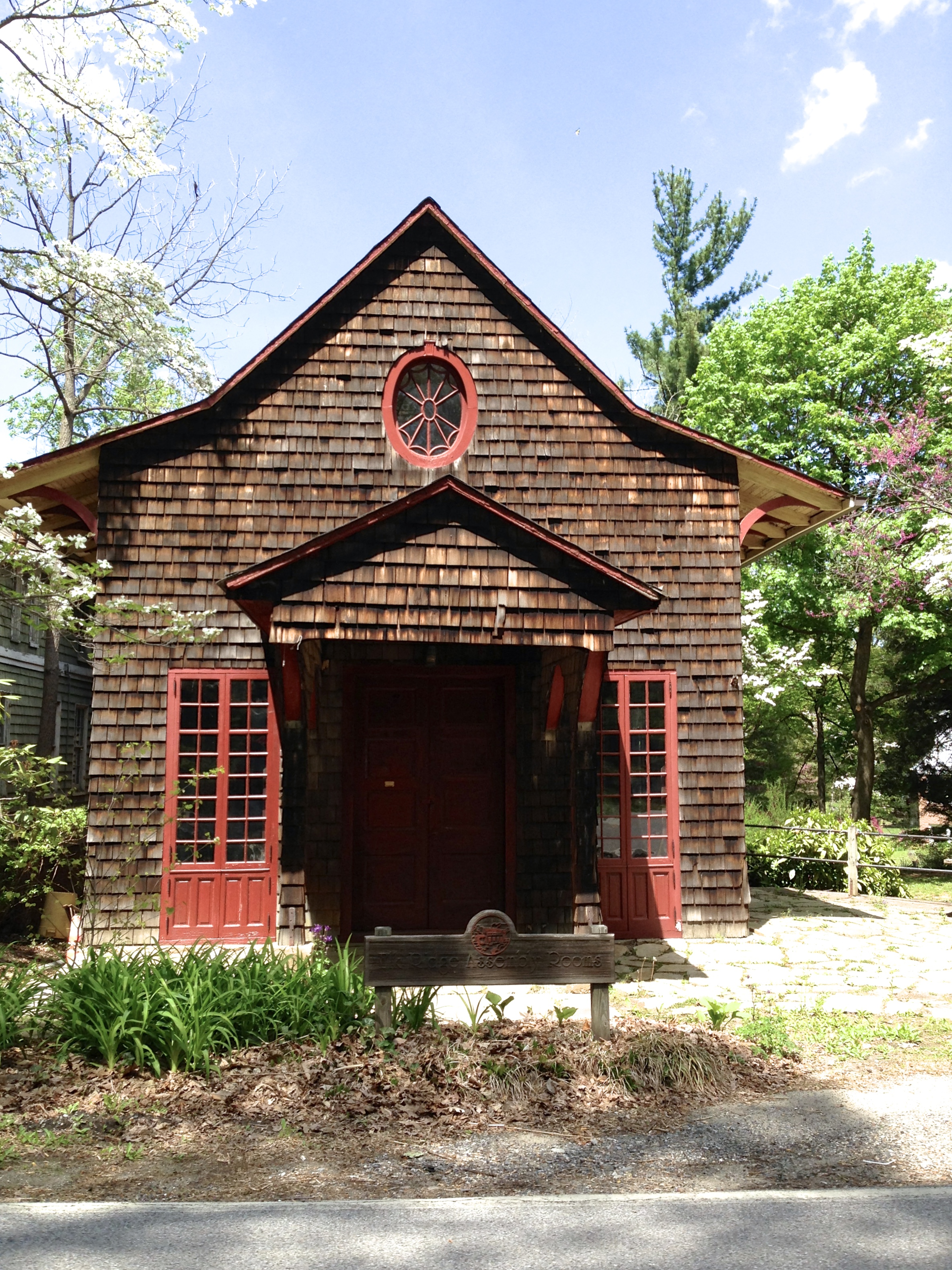
The Elkridge Assembly Rooms in Lawyers Hill was used as a "neighborhood parlor" since the 1870s.

=== Racial and ethnic composition ===
Elkridge CDP, Maryland – Racial and ethnic composition Note: the US Census treats Hispanic/Latino as an ethnic category. This table excludes Latinos from the racial categories and assigns them to a separate category. Hispanics/Latinos may be of any race.
Race / Ethnicity (NH = Non-Hispanic)	Pop 2000	Pop 2010	Pop 2020	% 2000	% 2010	% 2020
White alone (NH)	17,506	9,112	9,065	79.42%	58.44%	36.01%
Black or African American alone (NH)	2,100	3,005	6,814	9.53%	19.27%	27.07%
Native American or Alaska Native alone (NH)	37	37	50	0.17%	0.24%	0.20%
Asian alone (NH)	1,418	1,890	5,217	6.43%	12.12%	20.73%
Native Hawaiian or Pacific Islander alone (NH)	6	4	27	0.03%	0.03%	0.11%
Other race alone (NH)	60	49	178	0.27%	0.31%	0.71%
Mixed race or Multiracial (NH)	426	515	1,404	1.93%	3.30%	5.58%
Hispanic or Latino (any race)	489	981	2,416	2.22%	6.29%	9.60%
Total	22,042	15,593	25,171	100.00%	100.00%	100.00%

=== 2020 census ===
As of the 2020 census, Elkridge had a population of 25,171. The median age was 33.4 years. 26.9% of residents were under the age of 18 and 6.6% of residents were 65 years of age or older. For every 100 females there were 92.1 males, and for every 100 females age 18 and over there were 88.3 males age 18 and over.

100.0% of residents lived in urban areas, while 0.0% lived in rural areas.

There were 8,999 households in Elkridge, of which 42.6% had children under the age of 18 living in them. Of all households, 49.5% were married-couple households, 16.1% were households with a male householder and no spouse or partner present, and 28.2% were households with a female householder and no spouse or partner present. About 22.4% of all households were made up of individuals and 4.4% had someone living alone who was 65 years of age or older.

There were 9,323 housing units, of which 3.5% were vacant. The homeowner vacancy rate was 0.7% and the rental vacancy rate was 5.0%.

Racial composition as of the 2020 census
Race	Number	Percent
White	9,433	37.5%
Black or African American	6,951	27.6%
American Indian and Alaska Native	93	0.4%
Asian	5,236	20.8%
Native Hawaiian and Other Pacific Islander	28	0.1%
Some other race	1,126	4.5%
Two or more races	2,304	9.2%

=== 2000 census ===
As of the census of 2000, there were 22,042 people, 8,324 households, and 5,793 families residing in the CDP. The population density was 2,799.9 inhabitants per square mile (1,081.0/km^{2}). There were 8,719 housing units at an average density of 1,107.5 per square mile (427.6/km^{2}). The racial makeup of the CDP was 80.58% White, 9.59% African American, 0.21% Native American, 6.47% Asian, 0.03% Pacific Islander, 0.95% from other races, and 2.16% from two or more races. Hispanic or Latino of any race were 2.22% of the population.

There were 8,324 households, out of which 42.0% had children under the age of 18 living with them, 55.6% were married couples living together, 10.5% had a female householder with no husband present, and 30.4% were non-families. 22.5% of all households were made up of individuals, and 4.1% had someone living alone who was 65 years of age or older. The average household size was 2.64 and the average family size was 3.16.

In the CDP, the population was spread out, with 29.2% under the age of 18, 6.0% from 18 to 24, 44.4% from 25 to 44, 15.3% from 45 to 64, and 5.2% who were 65 years of age or older. The median age was 32 years. For every 100 females, there were 95.5 males. For every 100 females age 18 and over, there were 91.9 males.

The median income for a household in the CDP was $65,835, and the median income for a family was $71,923. Males had a median income of $47,329 versus $35,802 for females. The per capita income for the CDP was $27,629. About 2.0% of families and 2.7% of the population were below the poverty line, including 2.9% of those under age 18 and 5.5% of those age 65 or over.

== Government ==
=== Representation in Congress ===
Elkridge is included in three congressional districts: 2, 3, and 7. Congressional District 7 occupies areas north of Montgomery Road and west of Interstate 95, and is represented by Congressman Kweisi Mfume (D). Congressional District 3 covers central Elkridge; from south of Montgomery Road and east of Interstate 95 to roughly US Route 1 and the Anne Arundel County border. Congresswoman Sarah Elfreth (D) represents District 3. Lastly, Congressional District 2, represented by Congressman Johnny Olszewski (D), spans southward of Adcock Lane and Route 100.

=== County council representation ===
Elkridge comprises two county council districts: 1 and 2. Councilperson Liz Walsh represents central Elkridge from approximately westward from the Anne Arundel County boundary and northward from Ducketts Lane and Harwood Park. The second council district runs southward from Harwood Park and Ducketts Lane is represented by Councilperson Opel Jones.

== Education ==
Elkridge has several K–12 educational facilities: Hanover Hills Elementary school, Rockburn Elementary School, Elkridge Elementary School, the Ducketts Lane Elementary School. Elkridge middle schools include: Thomas Viaduct Middle school, Elkridge Landing Middle School on Montgomery Road and Mayfield Woods Middle School off of Mayfield Avenue. High school students in Elkridge usually attend either Howard High School in Ellicott City or Long Reach High School in Columbia.

Nearby secondary-level institutions include the University of Maryland Baltimore County, the Community College of Baltimore County Catonsville Campus, Anne Arundel Community College Arundel Mills Campus, and Howard Community College.

== Library ==
In 1984, Howard County Public Library opened the Elkridge Community Branch Library in a storefront on U.S. Route 1.

The Elkridge Branch opened in August 1993. The library was replaced by an innovative, 33.1 million dollar building on the same site in 2018.

== Recreation ==
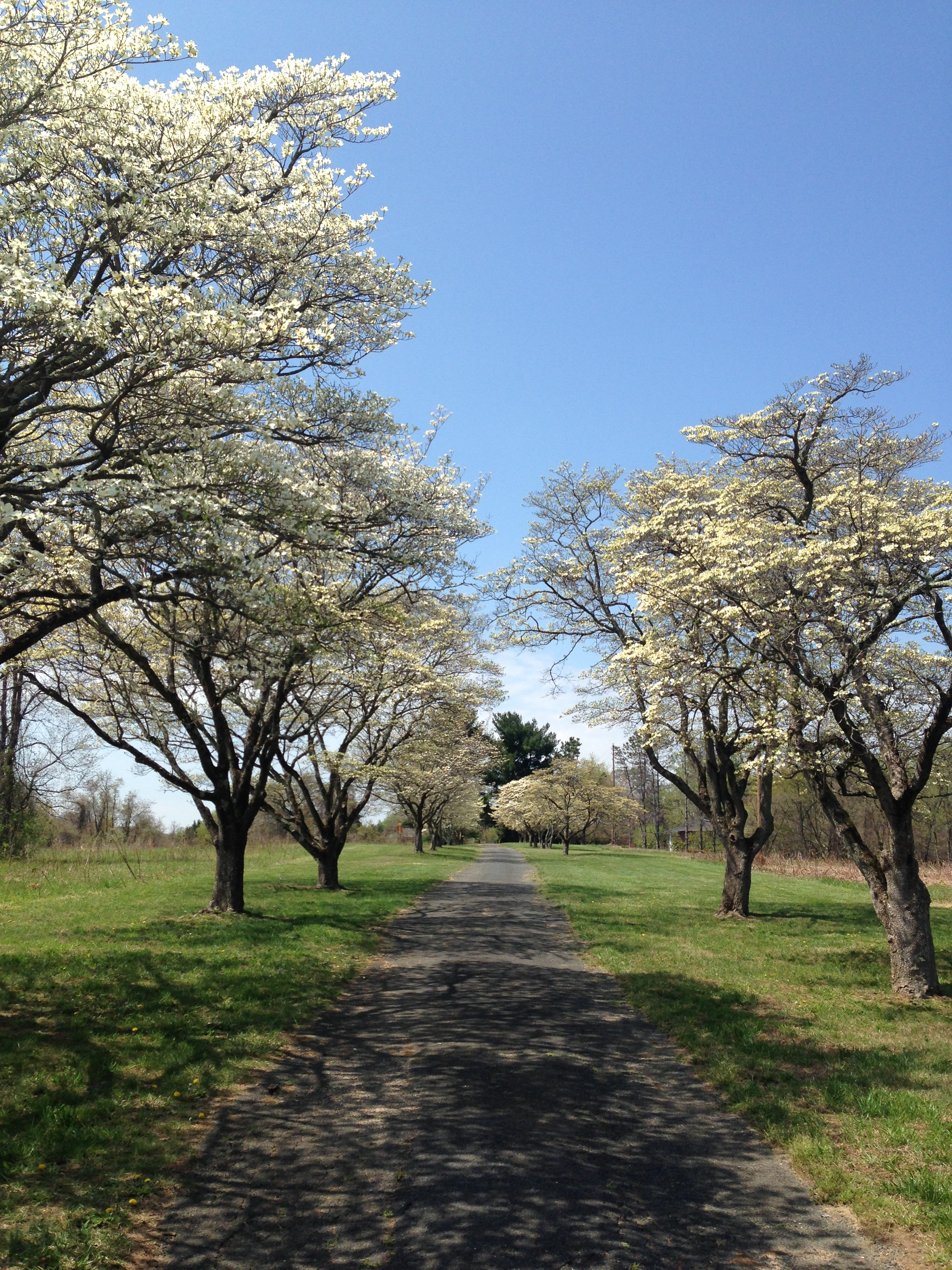
A pathway in Rockburn Branch Park in West Elkridge.

Elkridge includes a range of recreational areas throughout the town. Patapsco Valley State Park runs along the Patapsco River in North Elkridge, with entrances on Landing Road, River Road, and South Street in nearby Relay. Rockburn Branch Park in West Elkridge provides athletic fields, playgrounds, and nature trails. Also in West Elkridge, Belmont Manor and Historic Park hosts private events as well as nature programs with the Howard County Conservancy and surrounding schools.

Troy Park is under construction surrounding Troy Hill Manor.

=== Waterways ===
Elkridge is home to a number of small tributaries of the main waterway, the Patapsco River, that are used for recreation. They include:

- Bascom Creek
- Belmear Branch
- Budds Run
- Cascade Falls
- Deep Run
- Dorsey Run (Patuxent River)
- Rockburn Branch

== Historic sites ==
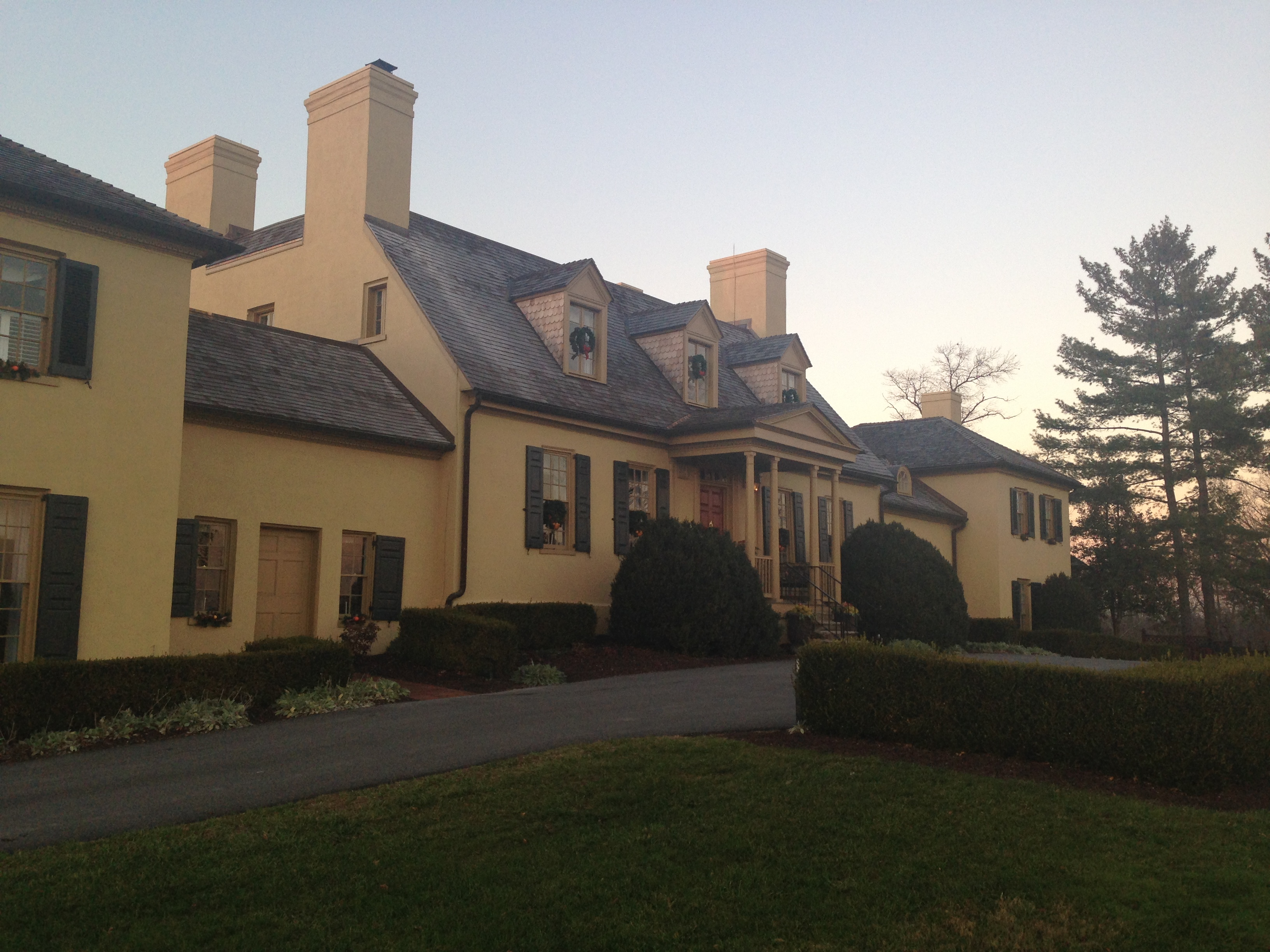
Belmont Estate in West Elkridge

- Belmont Estate, home of Dr. Mordecai Moore and Caleb Dorsey
- Clover Hill, plantation of Edward Dorsey
- Elkridge Furnace Complex, an historic iron works along the banks of the Patapsco River
- Lawyers Hill Historic District, one of Howard County's two historic districts.
- Marshalee Plantation, home of Confederate Colonel Charles Marshall, the land was named for Marshall and General Robert E. Lee, hence the name "Marshalee". The home was demolished to make way for the Timbers at Troy Golf Course and Lyndwood development.
- Rosa Bonheur Memorial Park, one of the earliest pet cemeteries in the United States, home to the Baltimore Zoo's first elephant
- The Lawn, home of Baltimore judge George Washington Dobbin
- Thomas Viaduct, the world's oldest multiple arched stone railroad bridge
- Trinity Church, a historical Episcopal church built in 1856
- Troy, historic farmhouse built in 1696 and home of John Dorsey

== Transportation ==
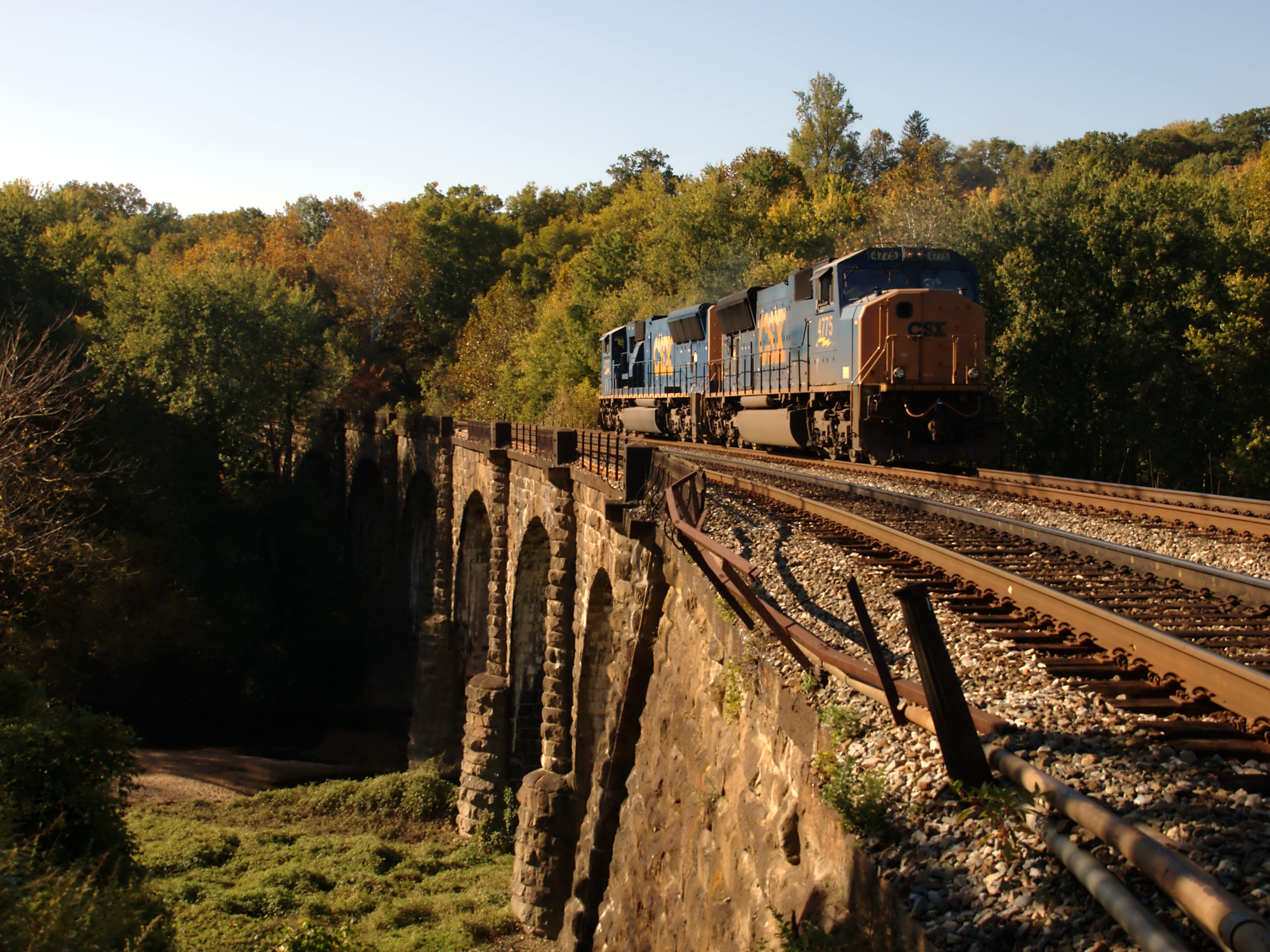
Engines on the Thomas Viaduct

Elkridge's main corridor is defined by Washington Boulevard, a historical road traveled by George Washington and known for "Dead Man's Curve" during early automotive travel. Interstate 95 forms the northwestern edge of the Elkridge census-designated place, and Interstate 895 crosses the northern corner of the community. Interstate 195 passes just east of Elkridge, with access from its Exit 3 with Washington Boulevard. Maryland Route 100 runs through the southern part of Elkridge, providing access to Ellicott City and Glen Burnie. The Baltimore-Washington Parkway travels just to the east of Elkridge, and will eventually include an interchange with Hanover Road, providing another method of travel to Elkridge from the south.

The historic B&O rail line owned by CSX provides the eastern border for most of Elkridge. The combination freight and passenger corridor overrides the water supply for Elkridge and Howard County, which is electronically monitored to detect precursors of explosive failures in the aging system. Water transportation has ceased since decreasing water levels on the Patapsco have made it unnavigable.

=== Public transit ===
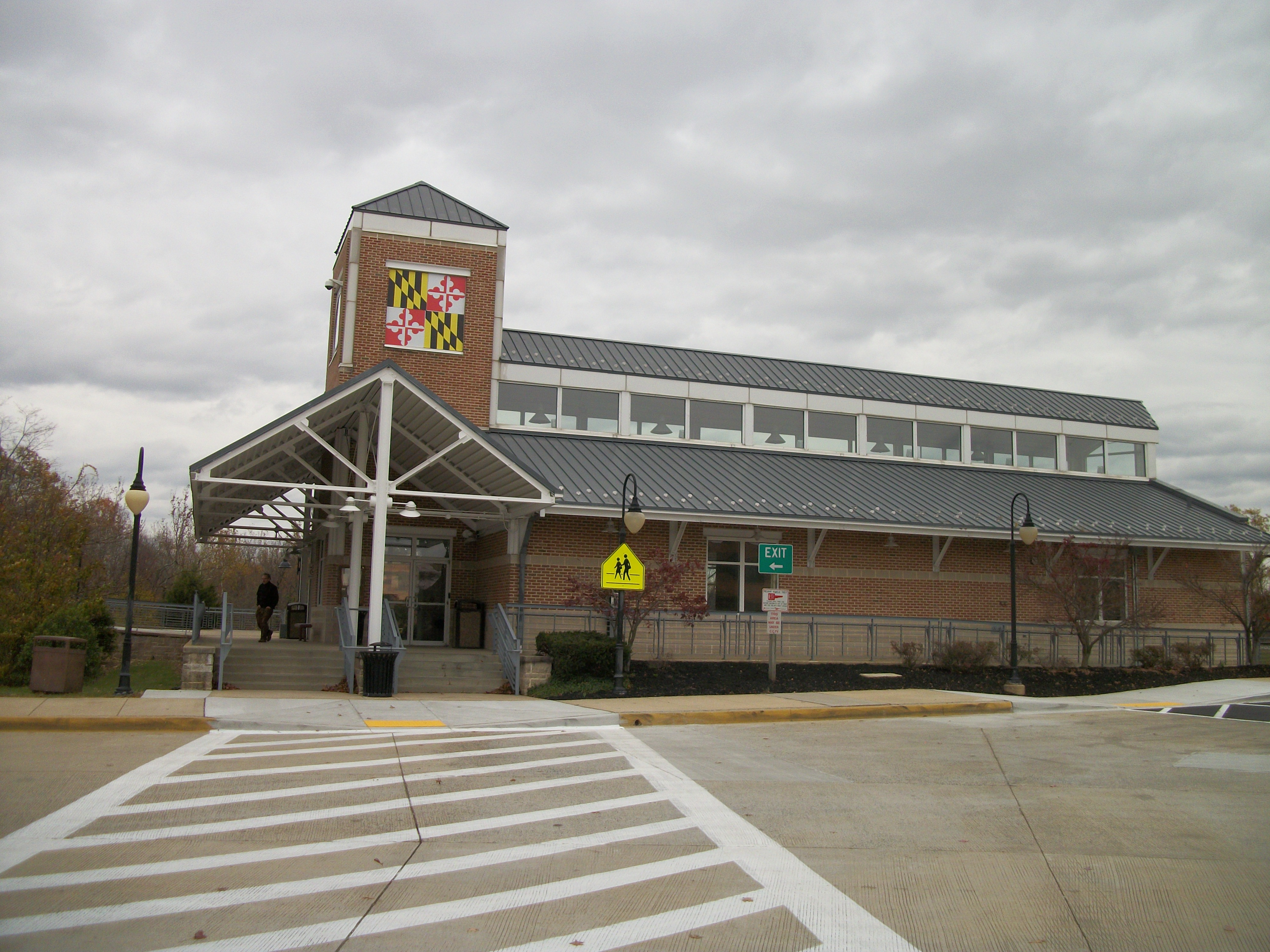
Dorsey Station provides Camden Line service to the Elkridge area.

The Regional Transportation Agency of Central Maryland Line 409 (Purple) travels from Laurel Town Center to Elkridge. The line follows Washington Boulevard, and circles Rowanberry Drive and Montgomery Road, terminating at Elkridge Corners Shopping Center. Also, Maryland Transit Administration has commuter bus service on Line 320 along Washington Boulevard.

Dorsey Station, located in southern Elkridge, provides MARC Camden Line service. Saint Denis Station in nearby Baltimore County also provides MARC service. The Baltimore Light Rail can be accessed by the BWI Business District Station 6 miles (10 km) away in Linthicum.

=== Roads ===
Major north–south routes in Elkridge include:

- U.S. Route 1 (Washington Boulevard) south to north from Laurel to Halethorpe.
- Interstate 95 traveling south to north from Washington, D.C. to Baltimore.

Major east–west routes in Elkridge include:

- Interstate 195 (Metropolitan Boulevard) traveling east to west from Catonsville to BWI Airport.
- Maryland Route 100 traveling east to west from Ellicott City to Glen Burnie.
- Maryland Route 103 (Meadowridge Road) traveling east to west from Ellicott City to Dorsey.

== Notable people ==
- Florence Riefle Bahr (1909–1998), artist and activist, Maryland's "Woman of the Year" in 1999
- Leonard Bahr (1905–1990), portrait painter
- Vernon Lee Clark, Serial killer
- Robyn Dixon, star in The Real Housewives of Potomac
- George Washington Dobbin (19th c.), Supreme Bench Judge
- Caleb Dorsey, operated furnaces along the Patapsco River and owner of Belmont Estate
- Chris Eatough (born 1974), a retired mountain bike racer who was part of the Trek Racing Cooperative team, and is now Howard County's first Bike and Pedestrian Manager for the Department of Planning and Zoning as of 2014.
- Ryan Fogelsonger (born 1981), professional jockey
- James Hall (1802–1889), founder of Maryland-in-Africa
- Benjamin H. Latrobe II, (1806–1878), bridge engineer, railroad executive
- John H.B. Latrobe, (1803–1891), lawyer, inventor, painter, writer, founder of the Md.Historical Soc'y. and Maryland in Liberia
- Carter Manley (born 1996), professional soccer player
- Jack Merson (1922–2000), Major League baseball player
- Robert Murray (1822–1913), Surgeon General of the United States Army
- Saint John Neumann (1811–1860), pastor of Saint Augustine Church 1849–1851
- George Poe (1846–1914), a pioneer of mechanical ventilation of asphyxiation victims
- James N. Robey (born 1941), former Maryland Senator and Howard County Executive from 1998 to 2002
- Jonathan Ward (born 1970), actor (Charles in Charge, Mac and Me)

== See also ==
- Belmont Estate

== Bibliography ==
- Elkridge Heritage Society (1983). Lawyers Hill Heritage: Elkridge - 3 Wars and the Peace.
- "Sidelight on the Baltimore Riot," Maryland Historic Magazine Quarterly. Mus. and Library of MHS. Winter 1994. p. 441.
- Cramm, Joetta M. (1987). A Pictorial History of Howard County. p. 441.
