= Trinity Church (Elkridge, Maryland) =

Historic church in Maryland, United States

- U.S. National Register of Historic Places
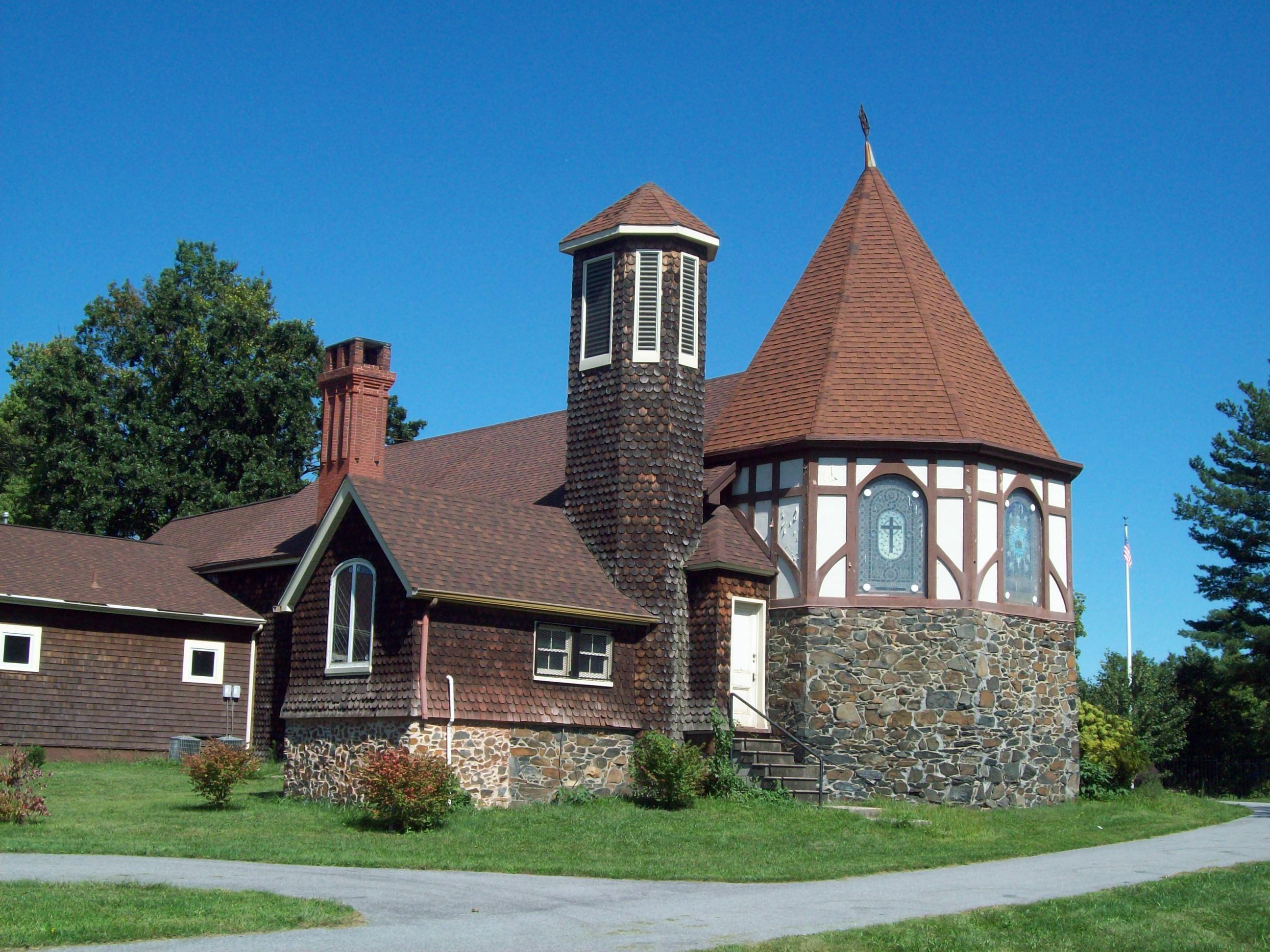
- Trinity Church (east end), Elkridge MD, September 2009

- Location within Maryland Location within the United States
- Location: 7474 Washington Blvd., Elkridge, Maryland
- Coordinates: 39°10′48″N 76°46′13″W
- Area: less than one acre
- Built: 1856
- Architectural style: Shingle Style
- NRHP reference No.: 74000957
- Added to NRHP: May 6, 1974

Trinity Church is a historic Episcopal church located at Elkridge, Howard County, Maryland. The post road site was also known as Waterloo, Pierceland, Jessop and Jessup throughout the years.

It was built starting on July 30, 1856, through 1857 as a chapel-of-ease in Queen Caroline Parish, the mother church of which was, and still is, Christ Church Guilford, near Columbia, Maryland. The church land was donated from William G. Ridgley and Dr. Lennox Birckhead, a Catonsville doctor who served in the Battle of Fort McHenry. The land was once part of Charles Carroll of Carrollton's land that comprised Spurrier's Tavern. Theodore Tubman and Myers Pearce (of Pierceland) deeded the cemetery to the north of the church as "Chapel hill".

The first rector of Trinity Chapel, Alexander X. Berger served in 1857. Columbia's Berger road development is named after him. Berger resigned in 1861 at the outbreak of the civil war. In 1866, Trinity Chapel broke away from Christ Church Guilford, becoming Trinity Church.

The church structure is a rectangular frame church of three bays with shingled walls and on the east end, a semi-octagonal apse of stone. Major additions to the original structure took place ca. 1890.

It was listed on the National Register of Historic Places in 1974.

== See also ==
- List of Howard County properties in the Maryland Historical Trust

== Gallery ==
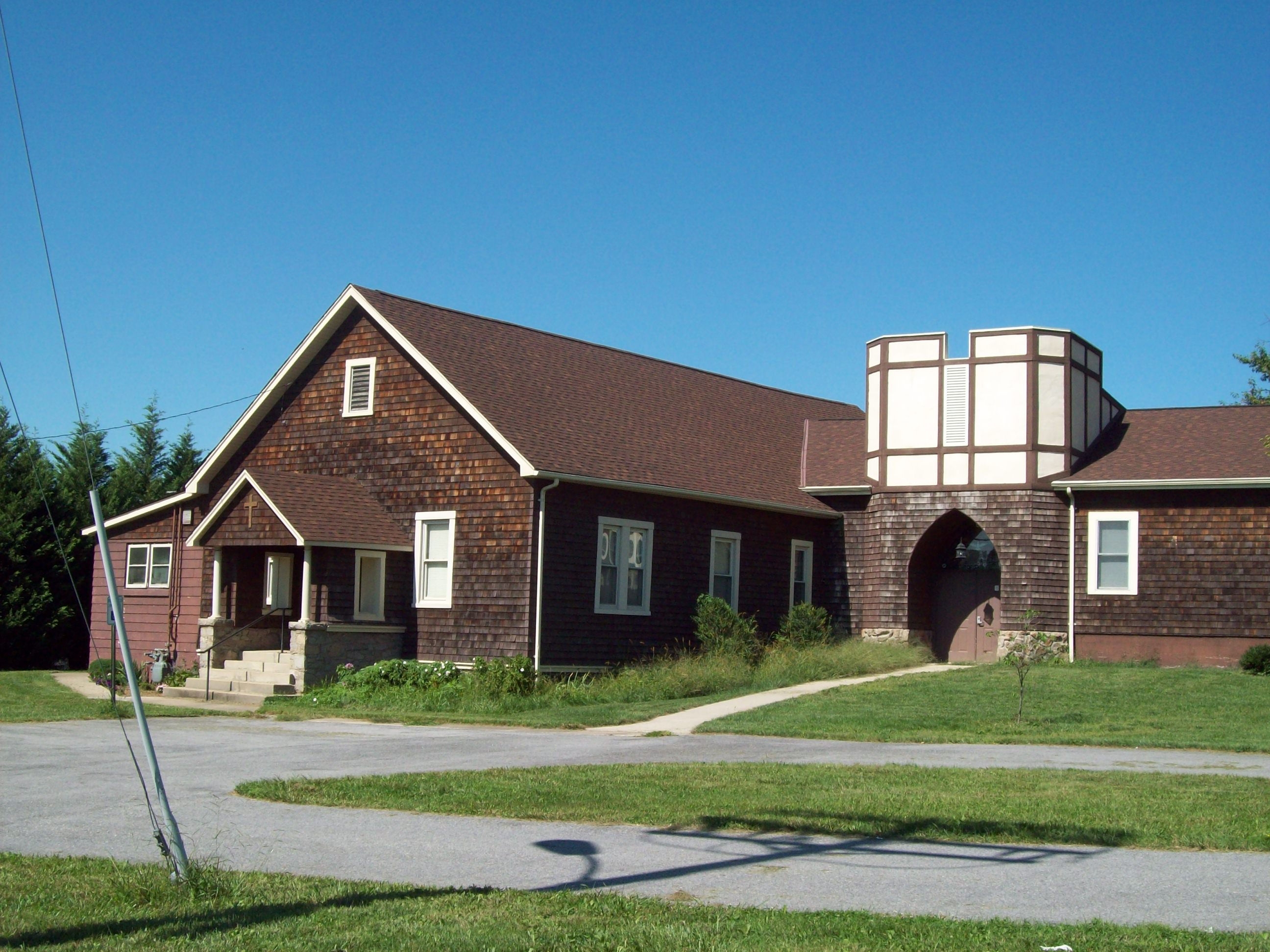
Trinity Church Elkridge Hall, September 2009

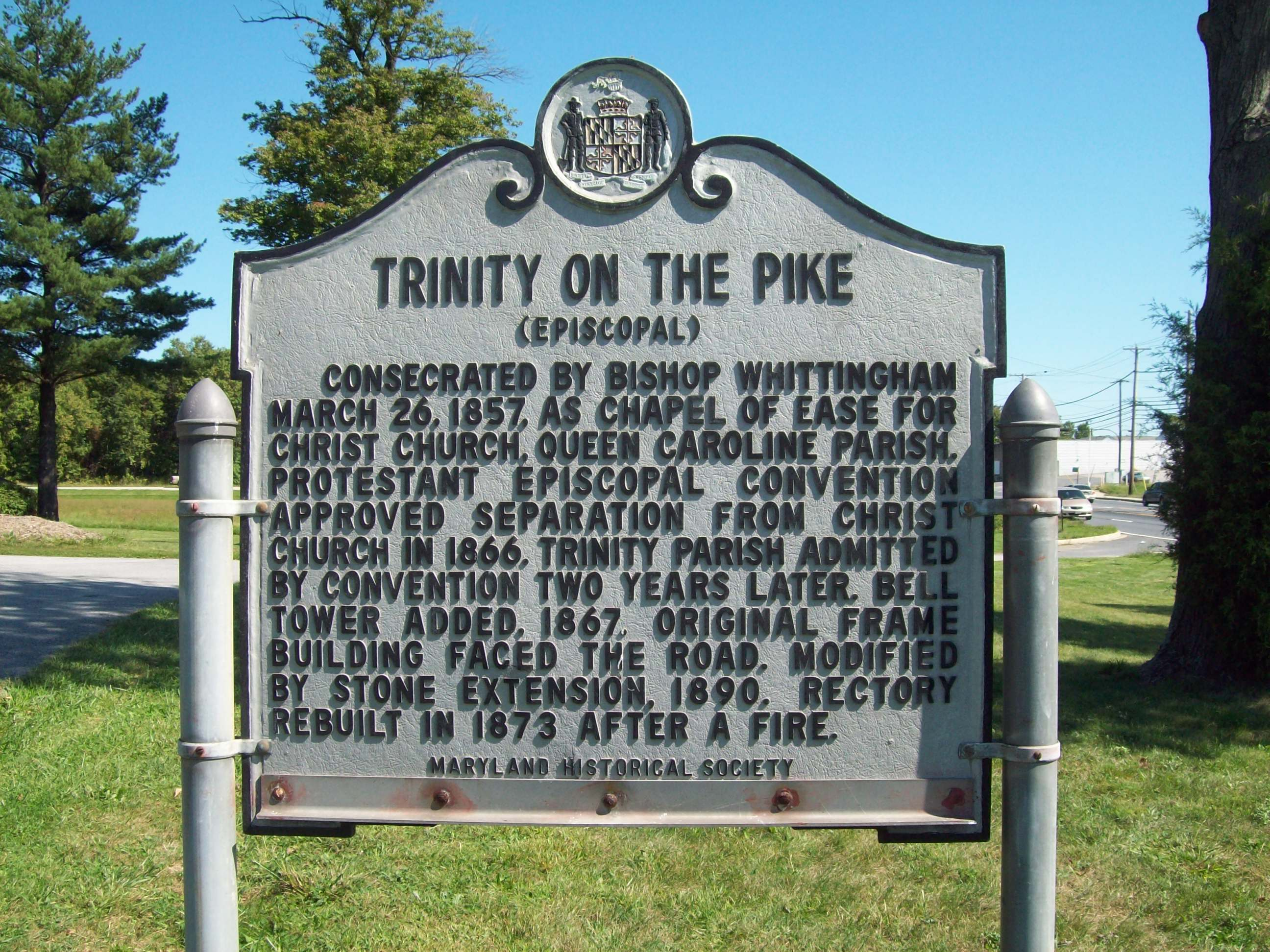
Trinity Church Elkridge Historic Marker, September 2009

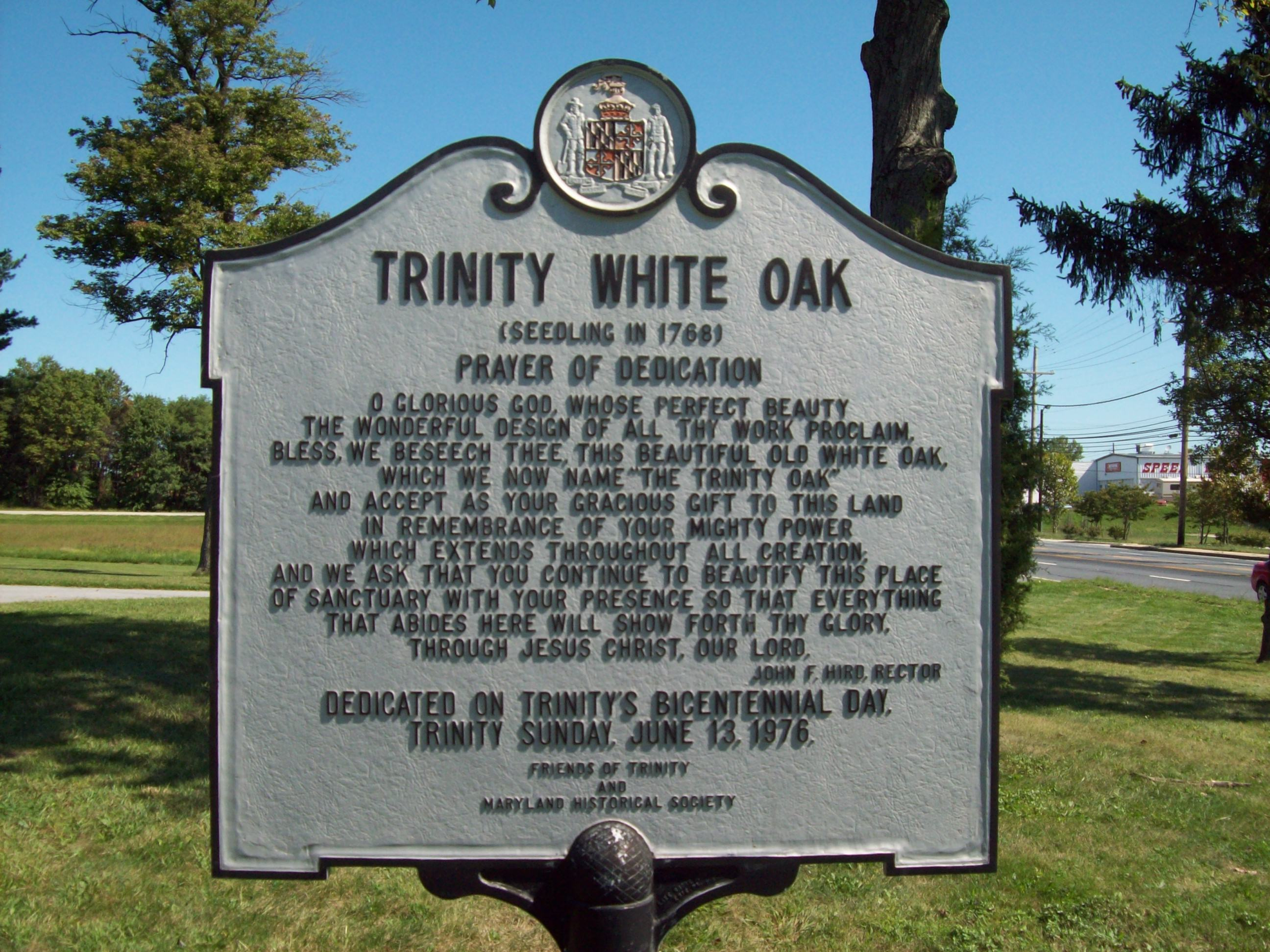
Trinity Church Elkridge Historic Marker, September 2009
