= Troy (Dorsey, Maryland) =

Historic house in Maryland, United States

- U.S. National Register of Historic Places
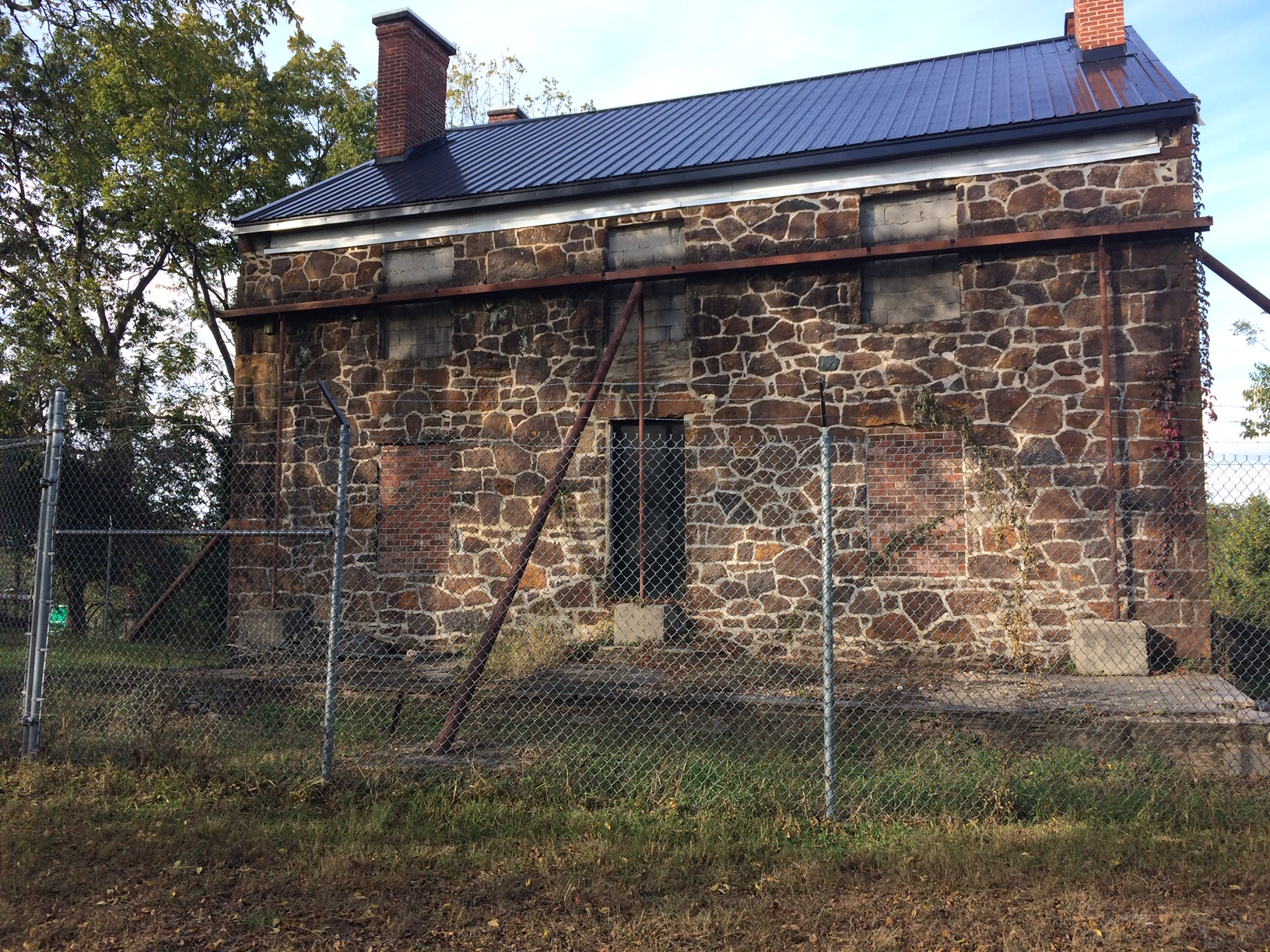

- Location within Maryland Location within the United States
- Location: Interstate 95 and Maryland Route 176 (6500 Mansion Lane), Elkridge, Maryland
- Coordinates: 39°11′46″N 76°45′47″W
- Area: 50 acres (20 ha)
- Built: 1808
- Architectural style: Georgian
- NRHP reference No.: 79001137
- Added to NRHP: June 22, 1979

Troy, also known as Troy Hill Farm, is a historic slave plantation home located at Elkridge, Howard County, Maryland, United States. It is associated with the prominent Dorsey family of Howard County, who also built Dorsey Hall.

== History ==
The lands of "Troy" were surveyed by Hon. John Dorsey in 1694, where he moved in 1696 with 2 slaves. The property stayed in the family though his great-grandson Col. Thomas Dorsey (−1790) of the American Revolution whose estate sold it in 1808. Troy was inherited by Basil Dorsey in 1714, followed by Caleb Dorsey who reduced the land to 1,016 acres (411 ha) which was split into two unequal parts in 1760 and given to Sarah Dorsey and Thomas Dorsey. Thomas Dorsey would use the root cellar as a meeting place with Benjamin Warfield of Cherry Grove during the revolutionary war. Thomas's widow Elizabeth split Troy several times to pay debts. Vincent Bailey acquired 652 acres (264 ha) including Troy for $6,520. A stone house named "Troy Hill" was built about 1808 on the foundation of an much earlier one story Dorsey house by Vincent Baily and is representative of the late Georgian style in Maryland architecture. The 2 1/2-story fieldstone house is three bays wide and two deep. Outbuildings included a stone barn, smokehouse and dairy. Situated on a hill, the fieldstone basement is unusually large with four rooms.

An 1830 fire destroyed the original wood paneling. In 1880, the house was modified with cottage styling. In 1942, the house was modified again into a "Colonial Revival" style. Further modification occurred by owner Pedro De Valle. Donald Doll was the last resident before the state purchased the property on December 16, 1958, to destroy it to make way for the I-95 project. The house was left in a state of purposeful neglect until Howard County purchased the stripped house and 52 surrounding acres in September 1971 for $67,500. In 1978, Howard County proposed to build an interpretative gardening center at the house. In 1989, the state offered a $350,000 matching grant for renovation, but a spring 1991 fire gutted the building before it was spent.

== Current status ==
Most of the surrounding Troy Hill farm has been converted into office parks or highway with the exception of one large area of wooded parkland surrounding the unrestored Troy House. In 2012, County Executive Ken Ulman proposed converting the remainder of the Troy Hill estate and wooded parkland into a tennis center. After costs escalated, the plans were changed to clear-cut most of the wooded parkland around the historic structure to implement revenue-generating ball fields and soccer fields for the parks system, allowing the Troy house to stand in the parking lot as a possible meeting house or restaurant.

Troy was listed on the National Register of Historic Places in 1979. In 2015, the group Preservation Howard County placed the house on its top 10 most endangered list.

== See also ==
- Troy Park
- List of Howard County properties in the Maryland Historical Trust
- Marshalee (Elkridge, Maryland)
- Spurrier's Tavern
