= Hockley Forge and Mill =

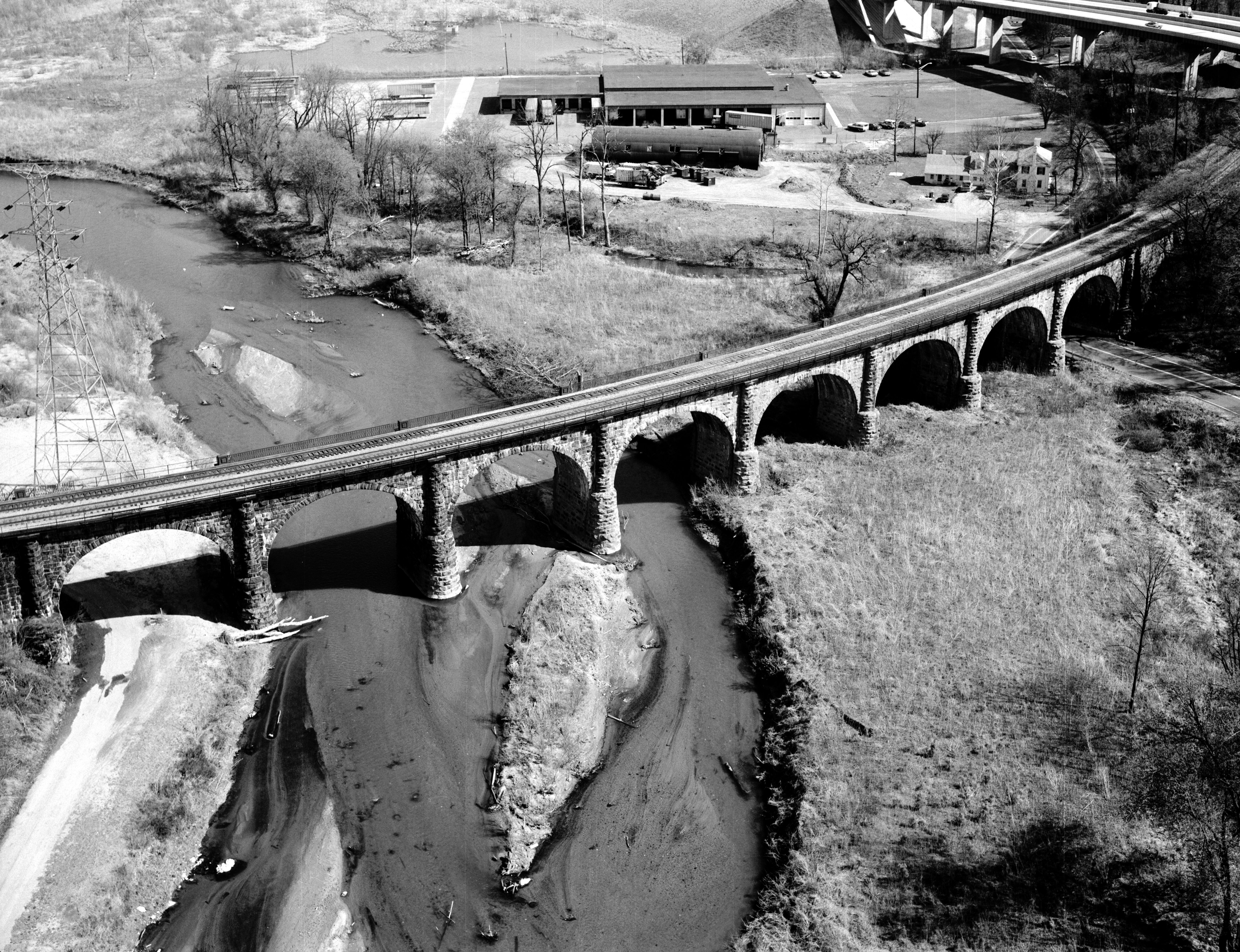
- 1977 picture of Thomas Viaduct crossing the mill site

- Location within Maryland

General information
- Type: Mill
- Location: Elkridge, Maryland
- Coordinates: 39.2206°N 76.7137°W
- Construction started: 14 June 1760
- Completed: 1760-1766

Design and construction
- Main contractor: Caleb Dorsey (1710-1772)

The Hockley Forge and Mill are a collection of colonial-era industrial buildings along the Patapsco River near modern Elkridge, Maryland. Located at the river's head of navigation, the site is a flat section of land along the Patapsco River valley with steep embankments on either side. At its 19th-century peak, the site held more than 30 industrial buildings.

Initially, the site was the Patapsco crossing of the "Old Indian Road" surveyed in 1734. In 1760, the forge site was surveyed by Edward Norwood; the forge itself was founded June 14 by Charles Carroll of Carrollton as the "Baltimore Company. Other partners included Charles Carroll of Duddington, Daniel and Walter Dulany, Charles Carroll (barrister) and Benjamin Tasker, Sr. who also operated two other forges. Operated by slaves, the forge produced goods to replace ones imported from England.

When the old Baltimore forge burned down in April 1772, slaves were sent to work at the Hockley Forge.

In 1781, the state of Maryland seized the company once owned in part by two Dulany cousins who were loyal to the British. Dan Dulany of Baltimore owned a remaining interest in the forge, and wrote the state to reimburse him for the loss in value due to losses sustained by loyalists in the colonial war. He cited that at the time, the forge property contained 100 acres and was operated by 98 slaves valued at 40 pounds each.

Forge work depended on a declining supply of coal and wood which idled the plant in 1783. In 1794, Christopher Johnston purchased the property and sold the equipment from the slitting mill to George Elliott for his upstream mill in 1807. The property was auctioned on September 16, 1819, renovated by the Carroll and Oliver families and resold in 1822. A large distillery operation was put into operation by John McKim Jr. which ceased by 1833 when the Thomas Viaduct construction began. The mill continued in operation by George T Worthington until a fire in 1856. In 1868, a major flood damaged the four-story mill. The Levering family acquired the site and sold it in 1876 to the Viaduct Manufacturing Company. A street through the site is now named Levering Avenue. From 1906-1910, a 20-by-30-foot room was rented to Marion B. Davis, who manufactured brass screw threads and socket assemblies for automobiles delivered by horse and carriage. The Viaduct Company produced telegraph equipment onsite until it was abandoned in 1914.

Since 1914, most of the remaining buildings have been demolished or destroyed by fire or flood.

== Buildings ==
(Maryland State Archives)

Hockley Forge
1760 - Built of stone
Saw Mill
Built before 1794 - Frame construction
Hockley-in-the-Hole (of Howard County)
One-story brick structure, 42 by 15 feet, built by 1798. Named after a separate land tract called "Hockley-in-the-Hole" by patented by Edward Dorsey in 1664.
Dairy, Smokehouse, Log Kitchen, (2) Frame Kitchens, (3) Wood construction Oat Houses
Multiple supporting buildings built before 1798
Grist Mill
Built prior to 1794 - Four-story brick construction, 60 by 44 feet, burned in 1851, damaged or destroyed by flood on July 24, 1868.
Slittling Mill
Built before 1798, 45 by 24 feet, stone
Blacksmith shop
Built before 1798, 30 by 16 feet, Stone construction
Saw Mill
Frame construction - 46 by 14 feet Built prior to 1798
Stable
Log building 25 by 18 feet built prior to 1798
Kitchen
Brick construction - built prior to 1829
Distillery
Built in 1829 - 102 by 42 brick construction, ceased in 1833
Malt House
Built in 1829 - ceased in 1833
Cooper's Shop
Built prior to 1829
(5) Slave quarters, Barn and Stables
Built prior to 1829

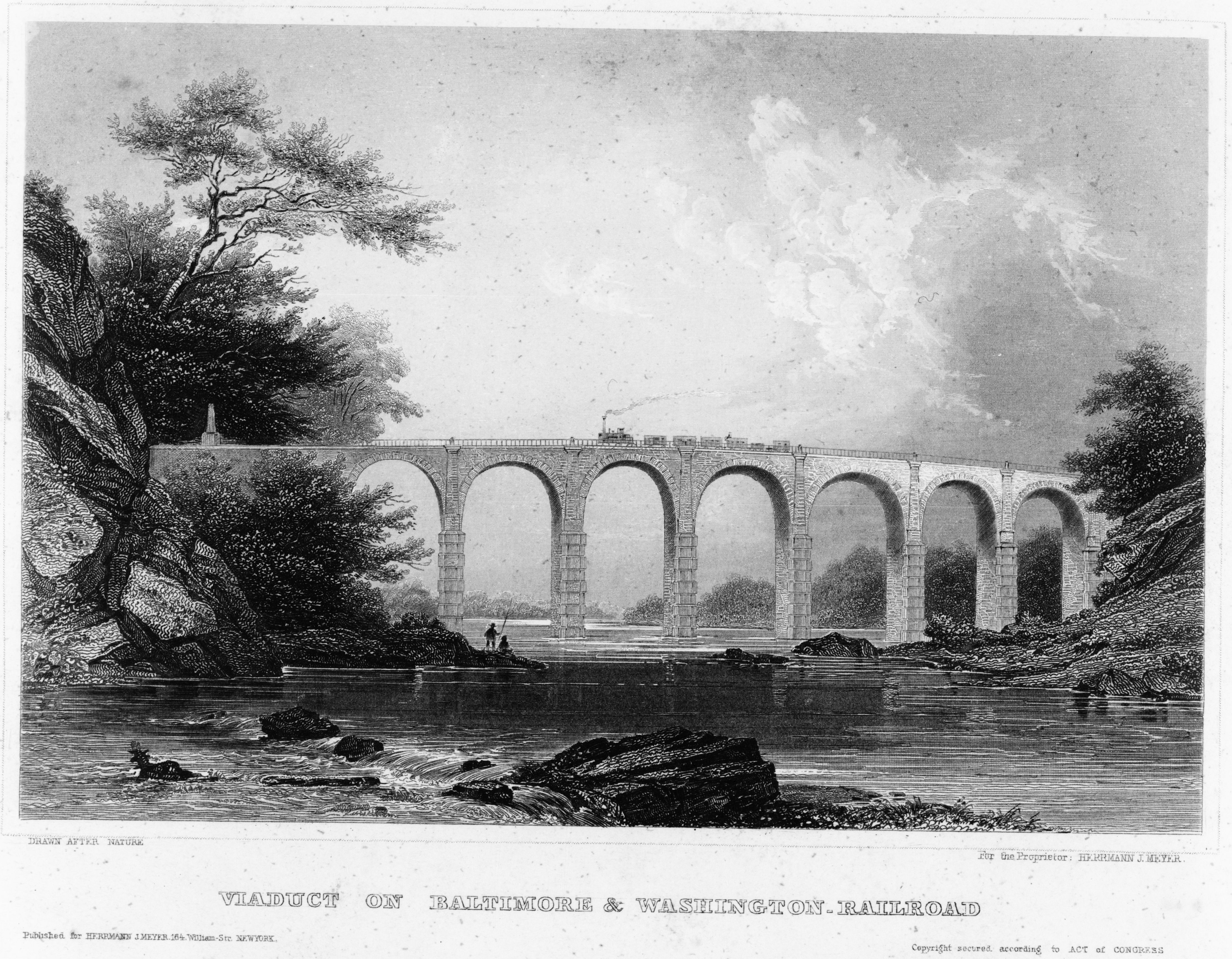
1858 drawing of Thomas Viaduct depicts the Patapsco spanning the whole valley

Thomas Viaduct
Curving stone arch bridge built in 1833 running across the river valley at the Hockley Forge site to start the first leg of the Baltimore and Ohio Railroad.
Grist Mill
Two story flour mill built on East side of viaduct in 1852
Grist Mill House
Telescoping structure with slave quarters.

== See also ==
- Elkridge Furnace Complex
- Thomas Viaduct
