= Lawyers Hill Historic District =

Historic district in Maryland, United States

- U.S. National Register of Historic Places
- U.S. Historic district
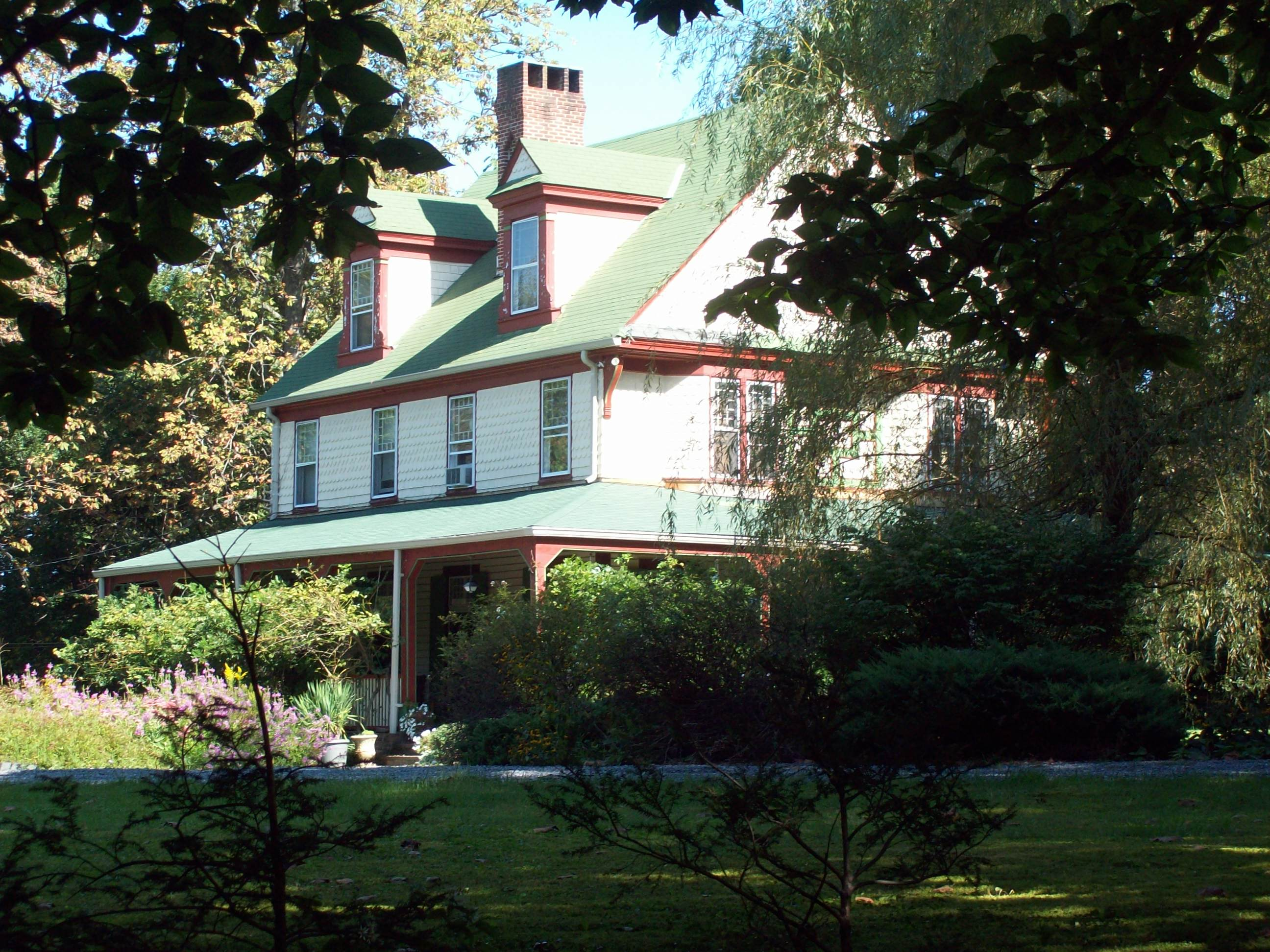
- Queen Anne Style House in Lawyers Hill Historic District, Elkridge, MD, September 2009

- Location within Maryland Location within the United States
- Nearest city: Elkridge, Maryland
- Coordinates: 39°13′12″N 76°43′53″W
- Area: 650 acres (260 ha)
- Built: 1730
- Architect: Multiple
- Architectural style: Georgian, Queen Anne, Gothic Revival
- NRHP reference No.: 93001000
- Added to NRHP: September 23, 1993

The Lawyers Hill Historic District is a national historic district located at Elkridge, Howard County, Maryland. The district encompasses a broad array of architectural styles ranging from 1738 Georgian Colonial to 1941 Georgian Revival. The collection of Victorian domestic architecture built during the 1840s to 1880s is unparalleled in the county, with no two houses the same. Some of the later cottages were designed by Philadelphia architect Brognard Okie. There are variations of the American Gothic Revival form, Italianate, Queen Anne, and Shingle-style structures. There is also a range of Colonial Revival houses, from craftsman era rustic cottages to more formal Georgian, and mass-produced Dutch Colonial models from the early 20th century.

The area developed originally in the 19th century as a summer community and early commuter suburb for prominent Baltimoreans. With the opening of the Thomas Viaduct in 1836, the Patapsco Valley south of the river was easily accessible to Baltimoreans. Many of the first residents were respected lawyers and doctors active in many of the professional and cultural organizations still vital in the state today. During the 1840s, as railroad service improved, Lawyers Hill residents began commuting to Baltimore on a daily and weekly basis, establishing the community as the state's first railroad commuter suburb.

It was listed on the National Register of Historic Places in 1993.

== See also ==
- The Lawn (Dobbin house)
