= Dorsey family =

Prominent family in the early History of Maryland

Dorsey
- Current region: Anne Arundel County, Maryland.
- Earlier spellings: D'arcy
- Origin: Unknown, likely England or Ireland
- Estate: Dorsey Hall

The Dorsey family of Maryland was a prominent family in the early History of Maryland.

It is unknown where Dorsey came from. Some have suggested County Cork, Ireland, but the best clue is perhaps the peculiar name of "Hockley in the Hole" for their settlement.

== History ==
The Dorsey family descends from boat-wright Edward Dorsey and his three sons. His name is also given as D'arcy. By 1649 he moved to Maryland and settled on the Severn. He converted to Quakerism in 1658, and drowned off Kent Island in 1659.

40 of Dorsey's descendants fought in the Civil War for the Confederate States.

His descendant in the ninth generation, Augustus Dorsey of Somerset County, Pennsylvania, was a sergeant in the 18th PA Cavalry, fought at Gettysburg, and survived nearly a year's captivity at Andersonville Prisoner of War camp. Another Gus W. Dorsey was there when JEB Stuart was shot at the Battle of Yellow Tavern.
