= Edward Dorsey (shipwright) =

- Born: about 1615; England
- Died: 1659; Kent Island, Maryland
- Resting place: Lost at Sea
- Monuments: Maryland Historical Society Marker "Hockley-in-the-Hole", MD 450 (Defense Highway) north side, 1500 feet west of Housley Road
- Occupation: shipwright
- Era: Colonial Maryland
- Known for: Early settler and patriarch of the Dorsey family
- Spouse: Anne
- Relatives: Edward Dorsey, son Hon. John Dorsey, son Joshua Dorsey, son Sarah Howard, daughter
- Family: Dorsey family

Edward Dorsey (c. 1615 – 1659) was a boat-wright and the patriarch of the Dorsey family of colonial Maryland. His name is also given as D'arcy.

== Biography ==
It is unknown where Dorsey came from. Some have suggested County Cork, Ireland, but the best clue is perhaps the peculiar name of "Hockley in the Hole" for his sons' settlement, suggesting they were English.

He first arrived in Lower Norfolk County, Virginia about 1642, brought by Cornelius Lloyd, and settled on land called 'Shepbush'. By 1649 he moved to Maryland and settled on the Severn. He converted to Quakerism in 1658. Dorsey drowned off Kent Island in 1659.

== Descendants ==
Some 40 of his descendants fought in the Civil War for the Confederacy. For example Gus Dorsey was present when Jeb Stuart died. He also had descendants on the Union side. His descendant in the ninth generation, a different Augustus Dorsey, of Somerset County, Pennsylvania, was a sergeant in the 18th PA Cavalry, fought at Gettysburg, and survived nearly a year's captivity at Andersonville Prisoner of War camp. Another of his many descendants are author F. Scott Fitzgerald and Wallis Simpson, Duchess of Windsor, wife of King Edward VIII.
