= Dorsey Hall =

Historic house in Maryland, United States

- U.S. National Register of Historic Places
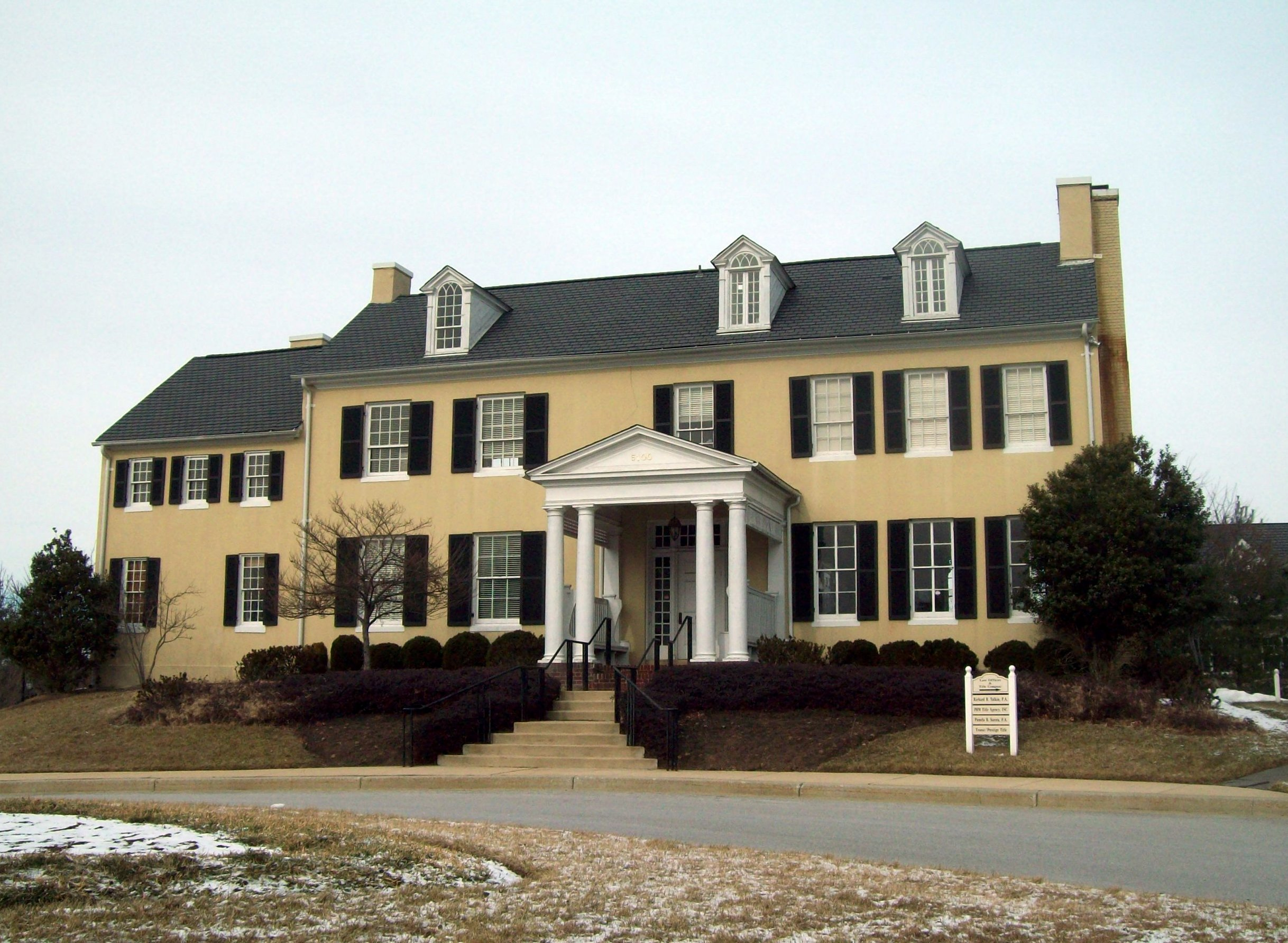
- Dorsey Hall, January 2011

- Location within Maryland Location within the United States
- Location: 5100 Dorsey Hall Dr., Columbia, Maryland
- Coordinates: 39°14′43″N 76°50′5″W
- Area: 2 acres (0.81 ha)
- Built: c. 1798
- Architectural style: Georgian
- NRHP reference No.: 01001374
- Added to NRHP: December 28, 2001

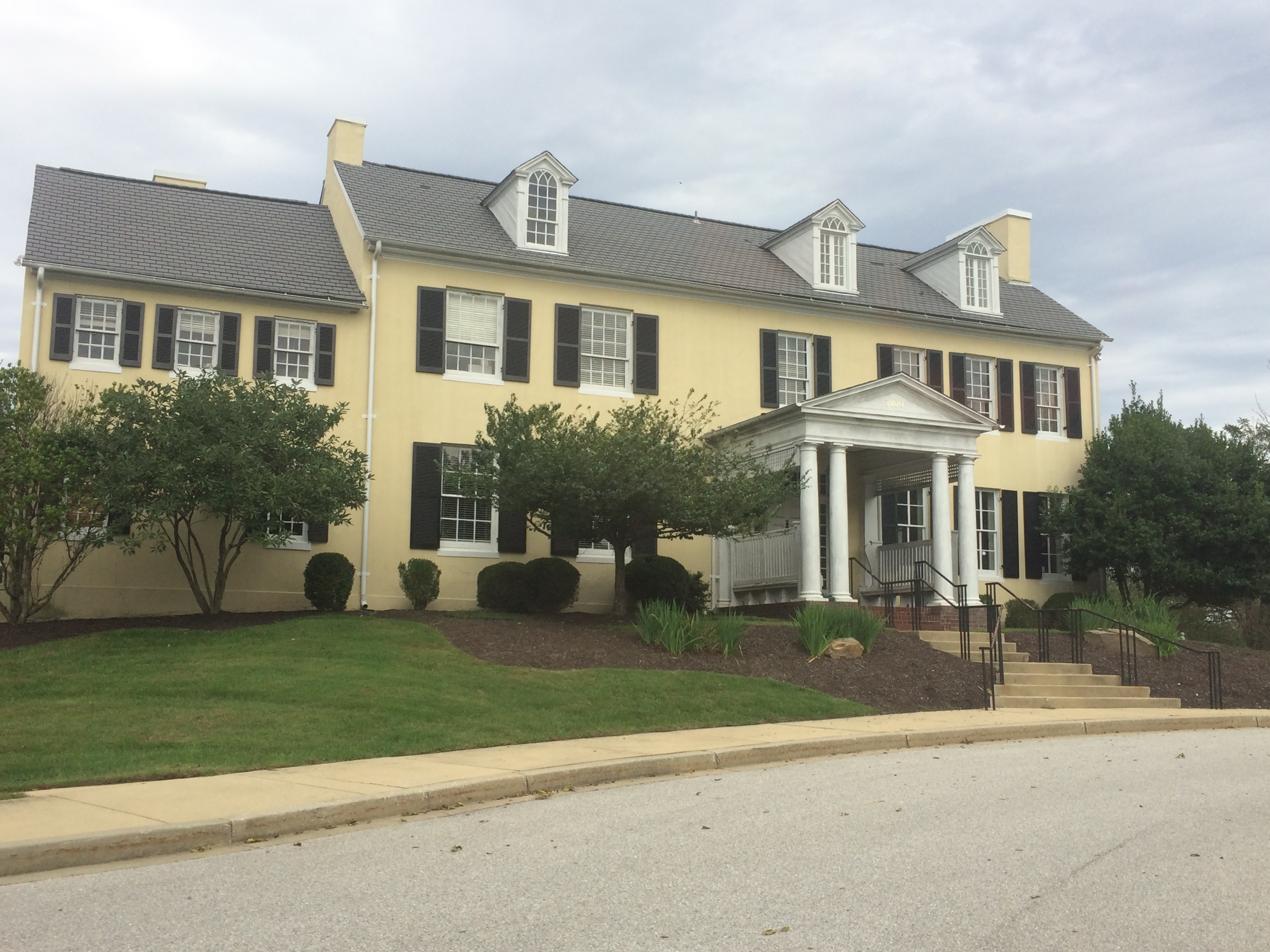
Dorsey Hall September 2018

Dorsey Hall is a historic home in Columbia, Maryland, United States. It is a six-by-one-bay, 2 1/2-story stucco structure with a gable roof covered with asphalt shingles. It is a well-preserved and detailed example of the vernacular dwellings of the early 19th century in Howard County and associated with the Dorsey family, one of the "first families" of the county.

Dorsey Hall was built on Dorsey's Search, a parcel of land patented by Hon. John Dorsey of Hockley-in-the-hole (1645–1714) in Baltimore County (now Howard County), the brother of Edward Dorsey. The 479-acre (194 ha) property adjacent to the north branch of the Patuxent River was surveyed by Richard Beard in December 1684, and granted to Dorsey in March 1696. The surrounding residential neighborhood of Dorsey's Search was named after the original land grant. Judge Richard Ridgley owned the property which returned to the Dorsey family after his death and purchase by Caleb Dorsey. The farm operated with slave labor until the death of Caleb Dorsey in 1864.

In 1963, owner Julius Mandel and Gudelsky Company attempted to rezone the site for high-rise apartments. The property was retitled to the Gudelsky-owned Contee Sand and Gravel Company. The 685-acre property was then purchased by The Rouse Company's shell corporation Columbia Industrial Development Corp. for redevelopment, which was halted in 1968 by residential opposition. The building underwent a renovation in 1979. The stone gristmill remains were still visible onsite at the time.

The 5.4 acres (2.2 ha) of land surrounding Dorsey Hall that was acquired by The Rouse Company was resold to land developers Richard Talkin and Donald Reuwer for $785,000 in 2000. In July 2000, a $3.5 million, 32,000 square-foot office project broke ground. By 2001, the site of the estate was subdivided and reduced to 2 acres with a survey claiming no outbuildings were present unlike the neighboring Woodlawn Estate from the same period.

Dorsey Hall now stands at the entrance to a business park (comprising mostly medical offices) at 5100 Dorsey Hall Drive, the architecture of which is compatible with the building. However, although it forms an imposing image, it has no signage or other identification and is not open to the public. The confusion is amplified by the adjacent business park at 5010 Dorsey Hall Drive, which bears a sign naming itself the "Dorsey Hall Business Park."

Just north of Maryland Route 108, Dorsey Hall is technically at the southern edge of unincorporated Ellicott City, Maryland, rather than the northern edge of Columbia.

It was listed on the National Register of Historic Places in 2001.

== See also ==
- List of Howard County properties in the Maryland Historical Trust
- Bethesda
