= J. E. B. Stuart Monument =

Monument of J. E. B. Stuart formerly in Richmond, Virginia

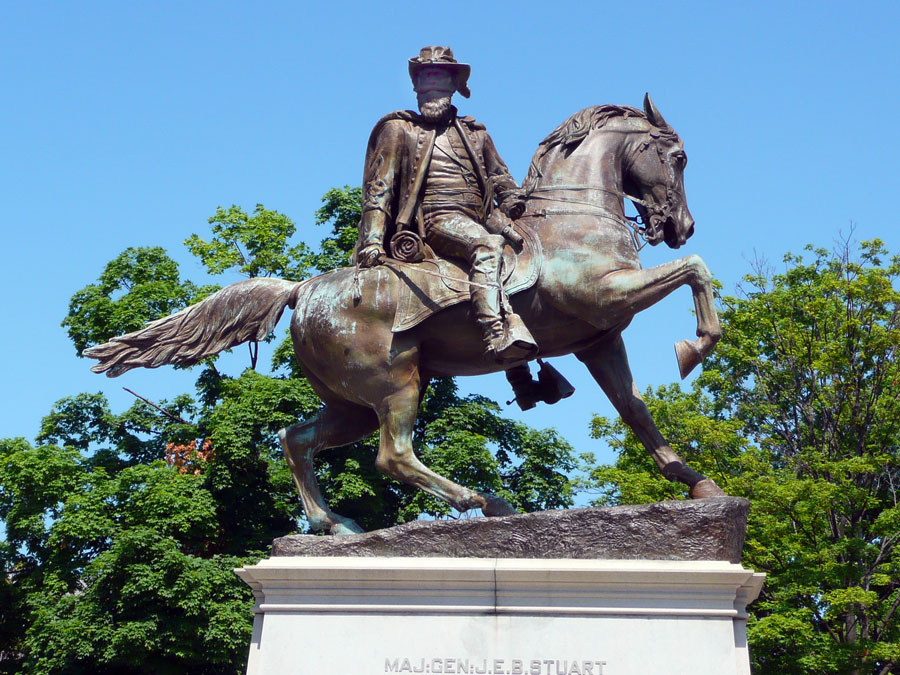
- The equestrian statue in 2009
- Artist: Frederick Moynihan
- Year: 1907
- Medium: Bronze sculpture; granite (base)
- Subject: J. E. B. Stuart
- Condition: Whole monument removed
- Location: Richmond, Virginia, U.S.; 37.552444°N 77.457778°W

The J. E. B. Stuart Monument is a deconstructed monument to Confederate general J. E. B. Stuart at the head of historic Monument Avenue in Richmond, Virginia, which was dedicated in 1907. The equestrian statue of General Stuart was removed from its pedestal and placed into storage on July 7, 2020 after having stood there for 113 years. The removal was in response to nationally reported events of police brutality and a corresponding emergency declaration in Virginia. The granite pedestal, which stood empty for nineteen months, was finally dismantled in February 2022.

== Description ==
The monument was located in a traffic circle known as Stuart Circle, located at the termination of West Franklin Street and the cross street of North Lombardy at the head of Monument Avenue. Stuart Circle has now been converted into a garden.

== History ==
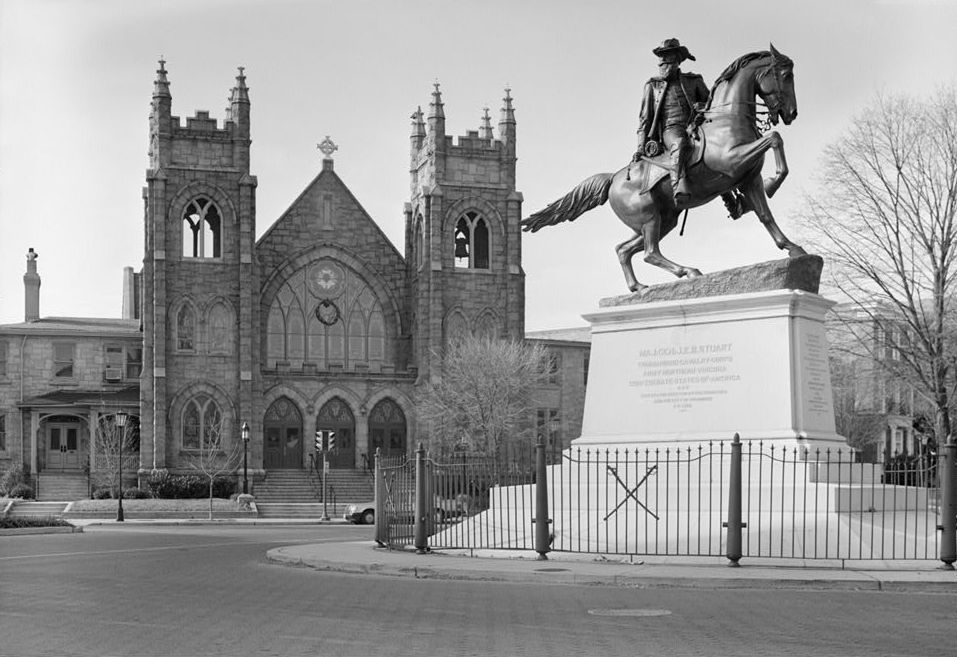
Southwest facing view of the Stuart monument and the First English Lutheran Church

The statue, sculpted by Frederick Moynihan of New York, was the second monument unveiled on Monument Avenue, in 1907, and was inspired by the statue of British Lieutenant General Sir James Outram in Kolkata, India. Stuart is turned in the saddle facing east while the horse faces north. The horse had one hoof lifted which, though likely a stylistic choice by the artist has been believed by local legend and based on other statues of the period to denote that Stuart was wounded in his last battle. Two lifted hooves would indicate a death in the heat of battle. (Stuart survived his wound on May 11 but died a day later on May 12.)

Plans for the Stuart statue were first discussed publicly as early as 1875; however the competition was not held until 1903. Fitzhugh Lee again chaired the selection committee, as he had for the Lee Monument. The site location was chosen in 1904. At the same time plans for the third monument, to Jefferson Davis, were being planned for further west at Monument Avenue and Cedar Street. The dual unveiling drew crowds even larger than for the Lee unveiling. Crowds were estimated between 80,000 and 200,000, including 18,000 veteran attendees who camped out for the week.

=== Removal ===
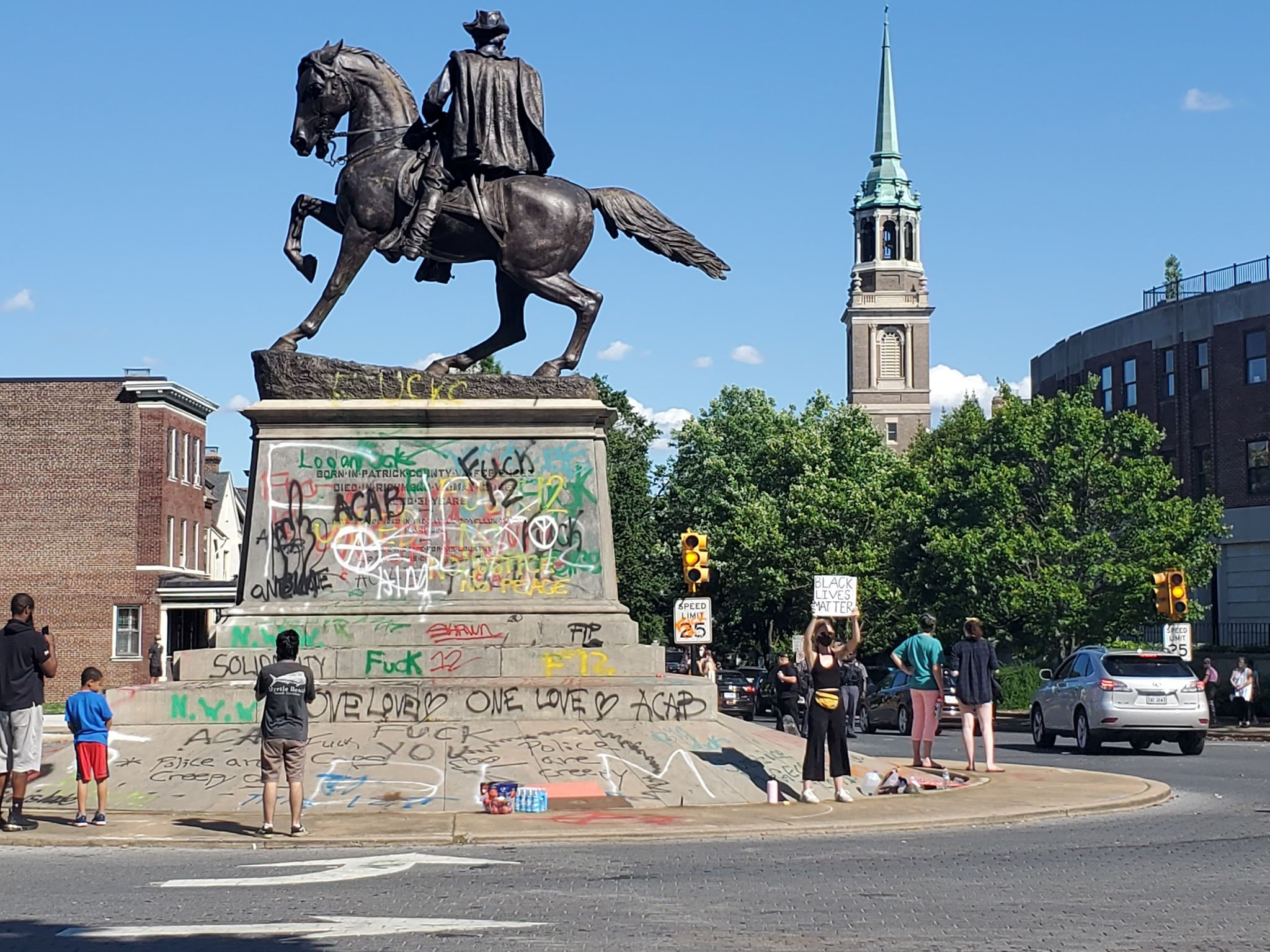
The defaced statue during the 2020 George Floyd protests

The Confederate memorials of Monument Avenue again came under scrutiny amid national protests and demonstrations against alleged racism, following the murder of George Floyd in Minneapolis, Minnesota on May 25, 2020.

After the amendment of the state law on the removal of Confederate war memorials, Governor Ralph Northam announced the imminent removal of the Robert E. Lee Monument, which is located on state land. On June 3, 2020, Richmond Mayor Levar Stoney announced he would introduce an ordinance on July 1 to have the J. E. B. Stuart Monument removed in additional to three other Confederate monuments, all located on city land. The Stuart equestrian statue was removed from its pedestal on July 7, 2020. The statue was then placed in storage with its location of subsequent display or other fate to be at a determined later date. In February 2022, the vacant pedestal was also removed.

== See also ==
- List of monuments and memorials removed during the George Floyd protests
