= Hon. John Dorsey =

Colonial settler of Maryland and Anne Arundel County

- Born: about 1645; Lower Norfolk County, Virginia
- Died: 1714; Troy, Baltimore County, Maryland
- Spouse: Pleasance Ely
- Parent(s): Edward (d. 1659); Anne
- Relatives: Edward Dorsey, brother Joshua Dorsey, brother

Coat of Arms of John Dorsey

Hon. John Dorsey (before 1646 – 1714) was a colonial settler of Maryland and Anne Arundel County, the youngest son of Edward the Shipwright. He and his brothers Edward and Joshua patented "Hockley-in-the-Hole" on the south side of the Severn in 1664. He acquired Troy in 1699.

John also owned Dorsey's Search. He was a delegate to the Lower House of Assembly in 1692, elevated to Upper House in 1711, remained till his death. As a member of the Assembly, he received the title Honorable.
