= Dorsey's Search, Columbia, Maryland =

Dorsey's Search
- Village
- Location within Maryland Location within the United States
- Coordinates: 39°14′25″N 76°50′48″W
- Country: United States
- State: Maryland
- City: Columbia
- Established: 1980
- Named for: Land owned by John Dorsey
- Website: https://www.dorseyssearch.org/

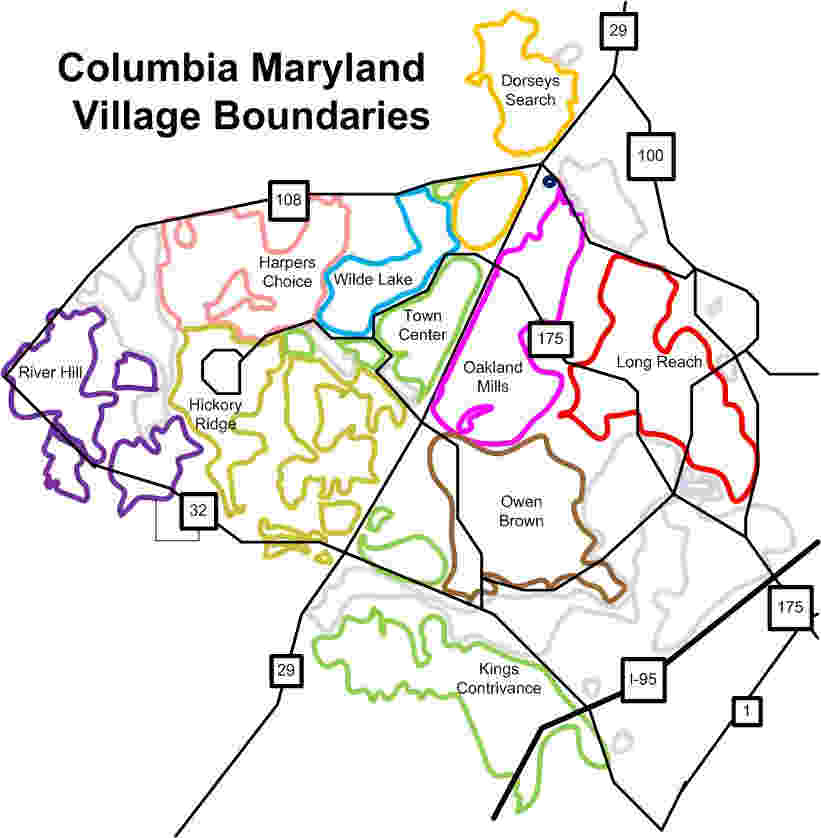
Villages of Columbia

Dorsey's Search is a parcel of land patented by John Dorsey of Hockley-in-the-hole (1645–1714) in Baltimore County (now Howard County). The 479-acre (194 ha) property adjacent to the north branch of the Patuxent river was surveyed by Richard Beard in December 1684, and granted to Dorsey in March 1696. The property lying between "Long Reach" and "Elk Ridge" was resurveyed in March 1723 to include 750 acres (300 ha). After several generations of inheritance, a series of legal disputes were held over the land by Rezin Hammond and Richard Ridgley in 1820. In 1827 the property exchanged hands to Robert Oliver, builder of Oakland Mill, who combined it with multiple properties totaling 2,300 acres (930 ha). George Gaither acquired the property in 1838. John Dorsey's grandson, "Patuxent" John Dorsey of "Dorsey's Search" built Dorsey Hall at the site.

== Dorsey's Search Village ==
Dorsey's Search is one of ten villages comprising Columbia, Maryland, United States, named after the land tract with a 2014 population of 7,500. Early land purchases and rezoning included Howard County Board of Trade member J Frank Gwynn's farm along Font Hill in 1955 by the Development and Investment Corporation of Maryland. The 715-acre parcel of land was purchased by the Howard Research and Development subsidiary of the Rouse Company in 1968 from the Gudelsky family that sought to rezone the area for high-rise apartments in the 1960s. The "Mandel" site was proposed to be a "Central Park" for Columbia featuring a high school, county office buildings, and a replacement for the Carr's Mill Landfill in 1974. In 1969, the County attempted to purchase by condemnation, the land occupying Centennial Park from a company run by the land speculator Joel Kline for $3,180 an acre. Kline was later indicted for real estate fraud that was linked to local politicians up to Spiro Agnew who was forced to resign. The County eventually bought the Centennial lake parkland from Kline's creditors at nearly twice the cost. Dorsey's Search was occupied starting in 1980. In 1999 the village manager was indicted for embezzling $121,000 of village funds. The current population is approximately 7,500. The village has two neighborhoods: Dorsey Hall and Fairway Hills. It is the northernmost Columbia village, with part of the village lying north of Maryland Route 108.

The village is the location of Dorsey Hall which was named after the local Dorsey Hall Manor House and former slave plantation, built in the 18th century. The village's street names are based on the works of American author Oliver Wendell Holmes Sr. Fairway Hills occupies the site of the former Allview golf course, closed in 1985 for subdivision.

== Services ==
Dorsey's Search Village Center opened in 1989, and has a community center, Linden Hall, as well as a grocery store, restaurants, and other retail establishments.

The poem "Musa" by Oliver Wendell Holmes Sr. provides the name for Linden Hall.

Fairway Hills Golf Club is an 18-hole par 70 golf course with Bermuda grass fairways, located in the neighborhood of Fairway Hills. It opened in 1995.

There is one outdoor pool, in Dorsey Hall.

== See also ==
- Arlington slave plantation (Fairway Hills Golf Club)

== Notes ==
- Mitchell, Joseph Rocco. New City Upon a Hill:A History of Columbia, Maryland (2007), The History Press, ISBN 1-59629-067-6
