= Gus W. Dorsey =

Confederate soldier

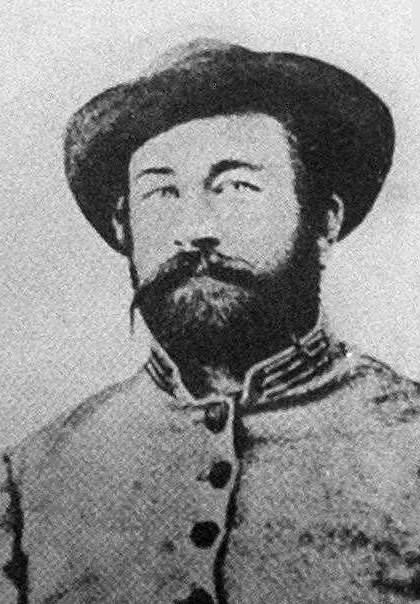
- Born: April 20, 1839; Columbia, Maryland
- Died: September 6, 1911 (aged 72); Brookeville, Maryland
- Military career
- Allegiance: Confederate States of America
- Branch: Confederate States Army
- Service years: 1861-1865
- Rank: Lieutenant Colonel
- Units: Company K, 1st Virginia Cavalry; 1st Maryland Cavalry
- Conflicts: American Civil War: First Bull Run; Peninsula Campaign; Seven Days Battles; Second Bull Run; Battle of Antietam; Fredericksburg; Battle of Chancellorsville; Battle of Brandy Station; Battle of Gettysburg; Wilderness Campaign; Yellow Tavern; Battle of Fisher's Hill; Siege of Petersburg; Battle of Appomattox

Gustavus Warfield Dorsey (April 20, 1839 – September 6, 1911) was a Confederate cavalry commander during the American Civil War. When famed cavalry commander J. E. B. Stuart was shot at the Battle of Yellow Tavern and mortally wounded, he fell into Dorsey's arms.

== Early years ==
G. W. Dorsey was born to Samuel Owings Dorsey and Mary Riggs Griffith on April 20, 1839, a descendant of Edward Dorsey of colonial Maryland. He had three sisters and a brother. He married Maggie Owens.

== Civil War ==
He enlisted on May 14, 1861 for Company K of the 1st Virginia Cavalry. He became a lieutenant colonel in May 1862, and after the death of his unit's commander Ridgely Brown, he commanded the regiment. He was wounded at Fredericksburg.

His unit was later transferred to 1st Maryland Cavalry in August, 1864. He was severely wounded at Fisher's Hill.

=== Yellow Tavern ===
Stuart rode up to give words of praise to Company K and was shot in the stomach. Dorsey caught him and took him from his horse. Stuart told him: "Dorsey...save your men." Dorsey refused to leave him and brought Stuart to the rear.
