= Arlington (Columbia, Maryland) =

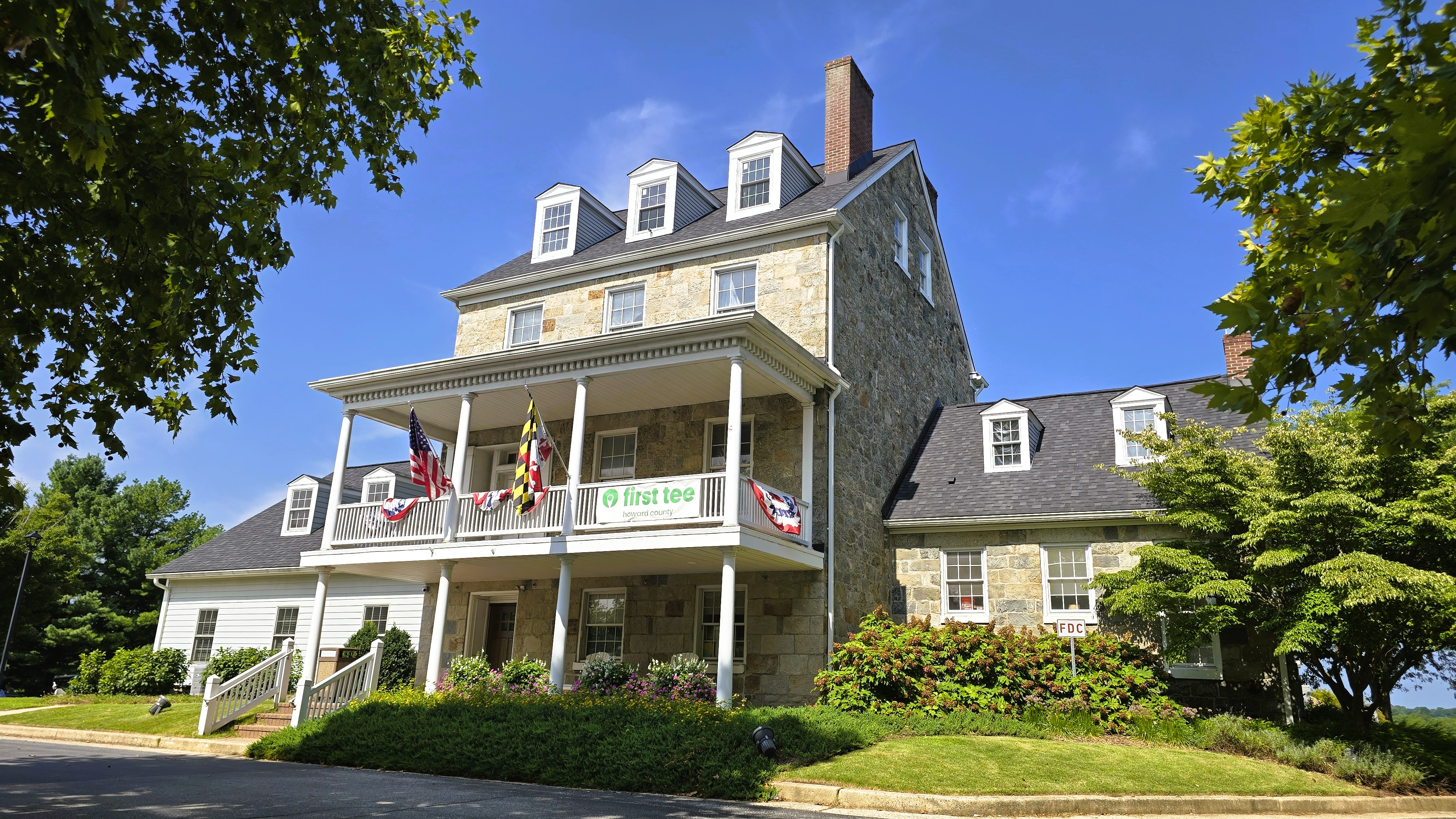

- Location within Maryland
- 39°14′10″N 76°50′39″W

History
- Built: Late 18th to early 19th century

Site notes
- Architectural style: Stone

Arlington is a historic slave plantation located in Columbia, Howard County, Maryland, now part of the Fairway Hills Golf Course.

The estate occupied several original land patents including "Dorsey's Search, Talbot's Resolution Manor, and Long Reach". The Northeast corner where the Columbia turnpike and Route 108 met formed a small community. The general store built in 1874 by the Bloom family was known as "Blooms Corner" and the downstairs post office was named "Columbia". The store served hard cider with mail delivered by horseback.

The Arlington house is a 1 1/2-story building with a later addition of a 3 1/2-story-tall granite stone building. It was built by slave labor using a circular scaffold that ringed the building for stones to be pushed or rolled into position A one-story wood slave quarters was attached by a walkway to the northwest. A wooden carriage house was built south of the manor.

In 1928, the Allview Golf Course was founded by New York Railroader Ed "Gunboat" Smith. (Nicknamed after the popular boxer). The golf course was built, but plans for a luxury resort fell through as the depression set in. Well known for enjoying drink, Dorsey and Roger Williams became tenants during the depression. The property was later purchased by Walter A. Edgar who operated the course as well as thoroughbred horse farms in the area. C. Oliver Goldsmith, owner of Thunder Hill, later acquired Allview, and Woodlawn Farms, after marrying Jean Edgar and the passing of her parents. Upon sale of Woodlawn, Allview, and Thunder Hill, Goldsmith moved his horse breeding farm to Longwood Farm in Glenwood.

The Allview property was key in expanding the Rouse Company land development project before public notification of zoning changes would raise the acquisition price. Only the Kingdon Gould (Kings Contrivance) and Guldelsky (Town Center) properties were higher priority. Howard Research and Development purchased a 98-year lease on the property. In 1977 the property was subdivided down to 177 acres and the historical survey recommended the property as a critical resource for state funded preservation. The house was converted in use to become the pro shop and restaurant named "Lucky Ned Peppers" for the Allview Golf course. In 1985 Allview was closed so that the course could be subdivided down to 162 acres from 206 for additional residential construction called Fairway Hills by the Rouse Company. In 1988, County Parks Board refused to accept 180 acres of the property for its use as a golf course, with the director saying it was downright ugly. Days later, the Columbia Association accepted an offer to transfer the golf course land from HRD. The Columbia association had issues with the cost of the $5.5 million proposal from Rouse that included contingent approval in order to restore the Arlington building. The course reopened in 1995 as the Fairway Hills golf course managed by the Columbia Association.

== See also ==
- List of Howard County properties in the Maryland Historical Trust
- Oakland Manor
