= Edward Dorsey =

Colonial settler of Maryland

- Born: about 1644; Lower Norfolk County, Virginia
- Died: 1705; Major's Choice, Baltimore, Maryland
- Spouse(s): Sarah Wyatt (d. 1692), Margaret Lacon (d. 1707)
- Parent: Edward (d. 1659)
- Relatives: Hon. John Dorsey, brother Joshua Dorsey, brother

Col. Edward Dorsey (before 1646 – 1705) was a colonial settler of Maryland and Anne Arundel County. His house at 211 Prince George St. is a historic Annapolis home, once occupied by Francis Nicholson from 1694 to 1709.

== Early life ==
On 25 March 1661, an at least 16-year-old Edward Dorsey returned to Maryland on a boat captained by Robert Mullen. His father was a boatwright and converted Quaker who had claimed lands in Maryland before drowning off Kent Island in 1659. In 1664, he was registered as a planter on one of his father's land surveys known as "Hockley-in-the-Hole". In 1667, he had taken on the craft as a boatwright and house builder around the settlement of Annapolis, Maryland.

By 1666, he was captain in the militia, rising to major in 1667.

== Later life ==
In 1675, he was registered as a lawyer. In the years 1679 and 1685, he was the justice of Anne Arundel County, Maryland. Around the time of the latter he moved into the house on Prince George Street. The first session of the Legislature in Annapolis was held in the house.

In 1694, he returned to the military as field officer of Calvert County, becoming Colonel in 1702. Before 1700, Dorsey moved to Major's Choice. His will was probated in 1705.
