= Battle of Yellow Tavern =

Battle of the American Civil War

Coordinates: 37.6599°N 77.4552°W

- Part of the Overland Campaign of the American Civil War
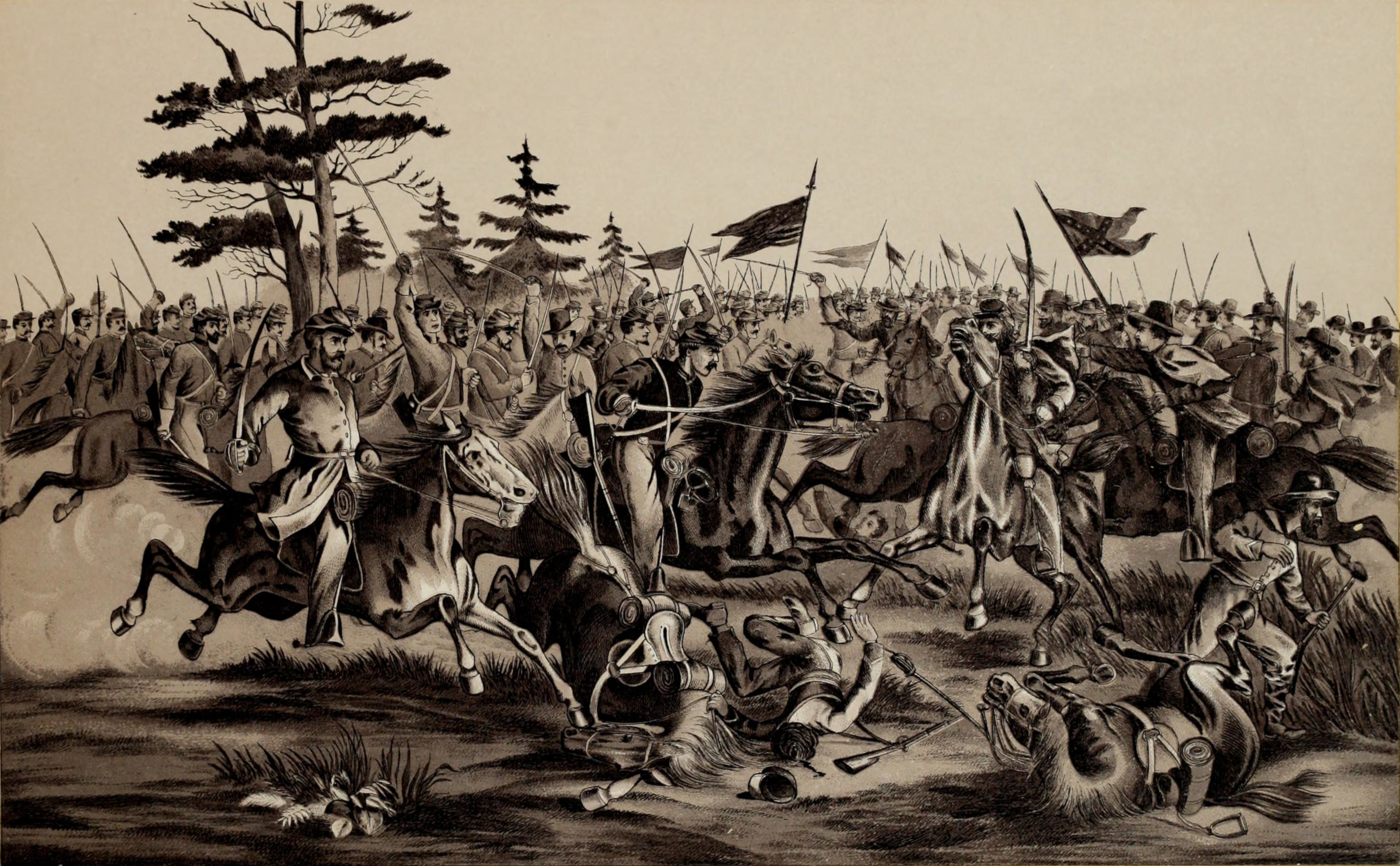
| Date | May 11, 1864 |
| Location | Henrico County, Virginia |
| Result | Union victory |

Belligerents
| United States (Union) | (Confederate States of America) CSA (Confederacy) |

Commanders and leaders
| (United States) Philip Sheridan | (Confederate States of America) J. E. B. Stuart (DOW) (Confederate States of America) Fitzhugh Lee |

Strength
| 12,000 | 5,000 |

Casualties and losses
| 625 casualties | 450 casualties 300 captured |

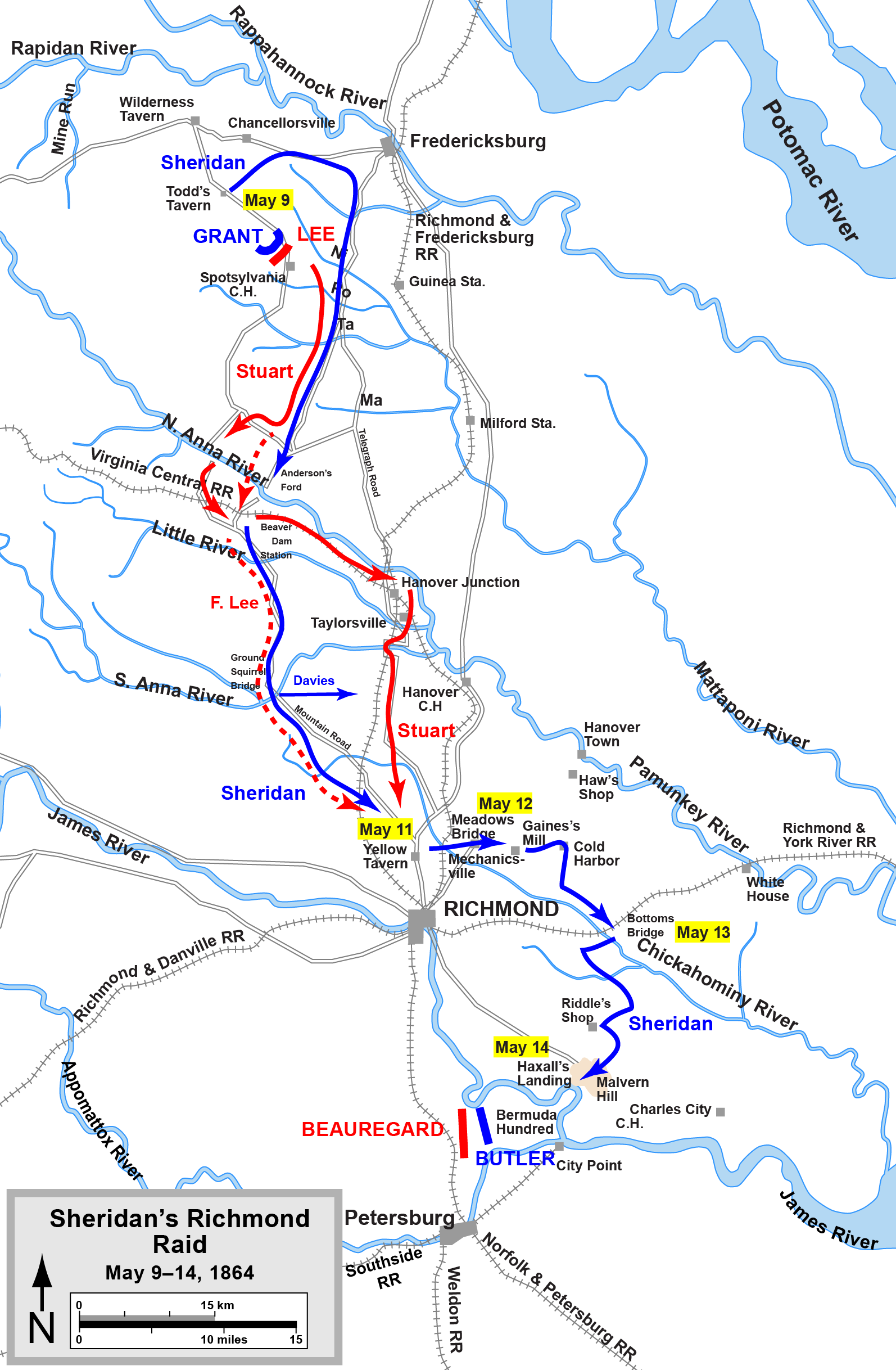
Sheridan's Richmond Raid, including the Battles of Yellow Tavern and Meadow Bridge

The Battle of Yellow Tavern was fought on May 11, 1864, as part of the Overland Campaign of the American Civil War. Union cavalry under Maj. Gen. Philip Sheridan was detached from Ulysses S. Grant's Army of the Potomac to conduct a raid on Richmond, Virginia, and challenged Confederate cavalry commander Maj. Gen. J. E. B. Stuart. The Confederates were outnumbered, and Stuart was mortally wounded.

== Background ==
The Overland Campaign was Union Lt. Gen. Ulysses S. Grant's 1864 offensive against Gen. Robert E. Lee's Army of Northern Virginia. The two had fought an inconclusive Battle of the Wilderness and were engaged in heavy fighting at the Battle of Spotsylvania Court House. Up to this point, Union cavalry commander Maj. Gen. Philip Sheridan was dissatisfied with his role in the campaign. His Cavalry Corps was assigned to the Army of the Potomac, under Maj. Gen. George Meade, who reported to Grant. Meade had employed Sheridan's forces primarily in the traditional role of screening and reconnaissance, whereas Sheridan saw the value of wielding the Cavalry Corps as an independently operating offensive weapon for wide-ranging raids into the rear areas of the enemy. On May 8, 1864, Sheridan went over Meade's head and told Grant that if his Cavalry Corps were let loose to operate as an independent unit, he could defeat "Jeb" Stuart, long a nemesis to the Union army. Grant was intrigued and convinced Meade of the value of Sheridan's request.

On May 9, the most powerful cavalry force ever seen in the Eastern Theater—over 10,000 troopers with 32 artillery pieces—rode to the southeast to move behind Lee's army. They had three goals: first, and most important, defeat Stuart, which Sheridan did; second, disrupt Lee's supply lines by destroying railroad tracks and supplies; third, threaten the Confederate capital in Richmond, which would distract Lee.

The Union cavalry column, which at times stretched for over 13 miles (21 km), reached the Confederate forward supply base at Beaver Dam Station that evening. The Confederate troops had been able to destroy many of the critical military supplies before the Union arrived, so Sheridan's men destroyed numerous railroad cars and six locomotives of the Virginia Central Railroad, destroyed telegraph wires, and rescued almost 400 Union soldiers who had been captured in the Battle of the Wilderness.

== Battle ==
Stuart moved his 4,500 troopers to get between Sheridan and Richmond. The two forces met at noon on May 11 at Yellow Tavern, an abandoned inn located 6 miles (9.7 km) north of Richmond (Present day location is at the intersection of Mountain Rd, Brook Rd, and Telegraph Rd.) Not only did the Union outnumber the Confederates by three divisions to two brigades, it had superior firepower—all were armed with rapid-firing Spencer carbines. The Confederate troopers tenaciously resisted from the low ridgeline bordering the road to Richmond, fighting for over three hours. A countercharge by the 1st Virginia Cavalry pushed the advancing Union troopers back from the hilltop as Stuart, mounted on horseback, shouted encouragement. As the 5th Michigan Cavalry streamed in retreat past Stuart, a dismounted Union private, 44-year-old John A. Huff, a former sharpshooter, turned and shot Stuart with his .44-caliber revolver, from a distance of 10–30 yards. Stuart died in Richmond the following day. Huff was killed at the Battle of Haw's Shop a few weeks later.

The fighting kept up for an hour after Stuart was wounded with Maj. Gen. Fitzhugh Lee taking temporary command.

== Aftermath ==
In the larger picture, Sheridan's raid proved to be a costly mistake. Chasing Stuart was another side show for the campaign, which would be decided by what the armies did at Spotsylvania. By abandoning the main theater of conflict to pursue his whimsical raid south, Sheridan deprived Grant of an important resource. His victory at Yellow Tavern offered scant solace to the blue-clad soldiers hunkering in trenches above the courthouse town. Sheridan's absence hurt Grant at Spotsylvania in much the same way that Stuart's absence from Gettysburg had handicapped Lee.

— Gordon C. Rhea

The Union cavalrymen suffered 625 casualties, but they captured 300 Confederate prisoners and recovered almost 400 Union prisoners. Sheridan disengaged his men and headed south toward Richmond. Although tempted to burst through the modest defenses to the north of the city, they continued south across the Chickahominy River to link up with Maj. Gen. Benjamin Butler's force on the James River. After resupplying with Butler, Sheridan's men returned to join Grant at Chesterfield Station on May 24. Sheridan's raid achieved a victory against a numerically inferior opponent at Yellow Tavern but accomplished little overall. Their most significant achievement was killing Jeb Stuart, which deprived Robert E. Lee of his most experienced cavalry commander, but this came at the expense of a two-week period in which the Army of the Potomac had no direct cavalry coverage for screening or reconnaissance.
