= J. E. B. Stuart =

Confederate cavalry general (1833–1864)

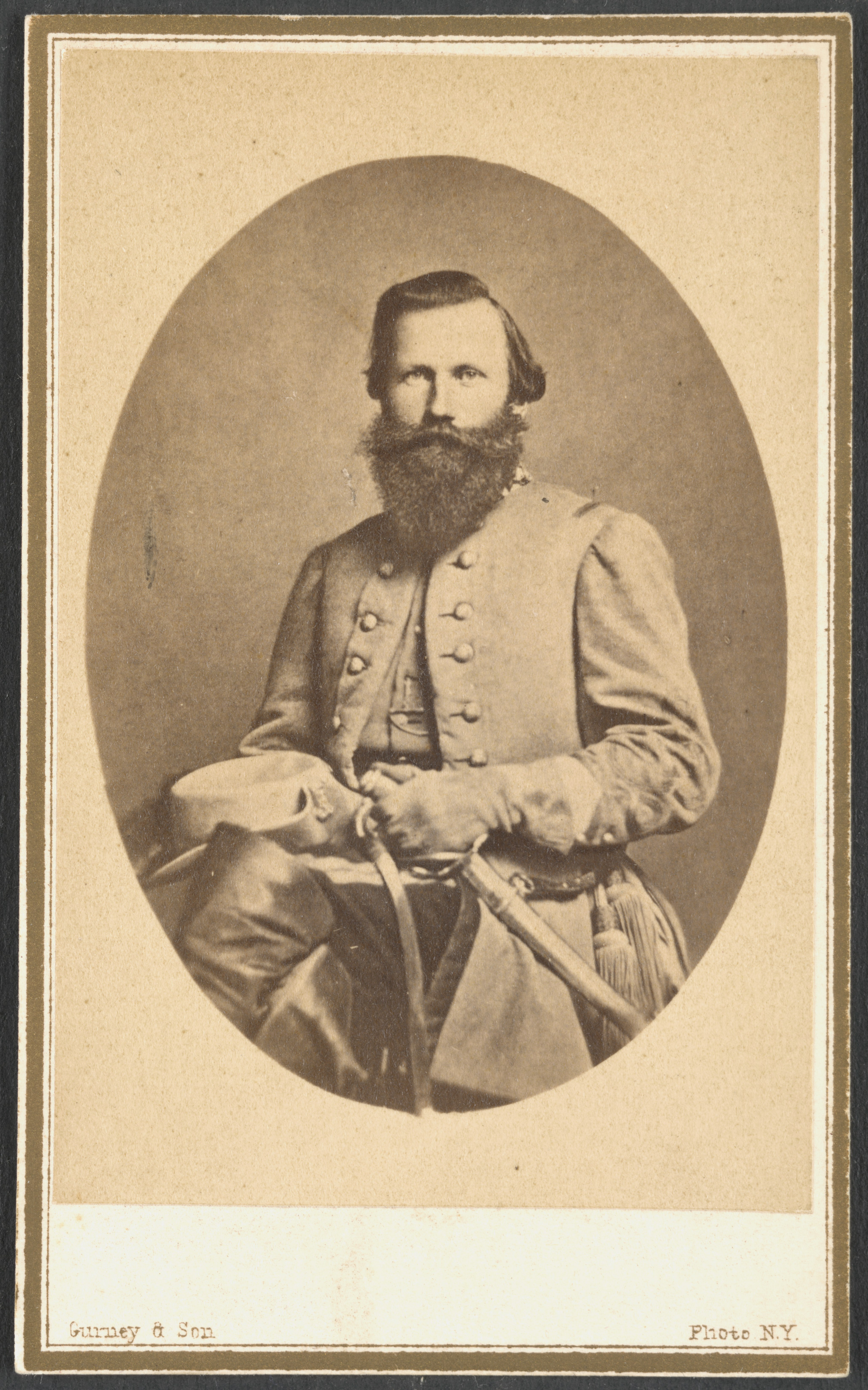
- Portrait by George S. Cook, 1863
- Born: James Ewell Brown Stuart; February 6, 1833; Patrick County, Virginia, U.S.
- Died: May 12, 1864 (aged 31); Richmond, Virginia, C.S.
- Burial place: Hollywood Cemetery, Richmond, Virginia, U.S.
- Education: United States Military Academy
- Spouse: Flora Cooke (m. 1855)
- Children: 4
- Military career
- Allegiance: United States; Confederate States
- Branch: United States Army (USA); Confederate States Army (CSA)
- Service years: 1854–1861 (USA); 1861–1864 (CSA)
- Rank: Captain (USA); Major General (CSA)
- Nicknames: "Jeb", "Bible Class Man", "Beauty", "Knight of the Golden Spurs", "Cavalier of Dixie", “the Beau Sabreur of the Confederacy”
- Commands: 1st Virginia Cavalry; Cavalry Corps, Army of Northern Virginia
- Conflicts: Bleeding Kansas; John Brown's raid on Harpers Ferry; American Civil War; First Battle of Bull Run; Peninsula Campaign; Battle of Williamsburg; Northern Virginia Campaign; Second Battle of Bull Run; Battle of Chantilly; Maryland Campaign; Battle of South Mountain; Battle of Antietam; Raid on Chambersburg; Battle of Fredericksburg; Battle of Chancellorsville; Gettysburg campaign; Battle of Brandy Station; Battle of Hanover; Battle of Gettysburg; Overland Campaign; Battle of the Wilderness; Battle of Yellow Tavern (DOW)

James Ewell Brown "Jeb" Stuart (February 6, 1833 – May 12, 1864) was a Confederate cavalry general during the American Civil War. He was known to his friends as "Jeb", from the initials of his given names. Stuart was a cavalry commander known for his mastery of reconnaissance and the use of cavalry in support of offensive operations. While he cultivated a cavalier image (red-lined gray cape, the yellow waist sash of a regular cavalry officer, hat cocked to the side with an ostrich plume, red flower in his lapel, often sporting cologne), his serious work made him the trusted eyes and ears of Robert E. Lee's army and inspired Southern morale.

Stuart graduated from West Point in 1854 and served in Texas and Kansas with the U.S. Army. Stuart was a veteran of the frontier conflicts with Native Americans and the violence of Bleeding Kansas, and he participated in the capture of John Brown at Harpers Ferry. He resigned his commission when his home state of Virginia seceded, to serve in the Confederate Army, first under Stonewall Jackson in the Shenandoah Valley, but then in increasingly important cavalry commands of the Army of Northern Virginia, playing a role in all of that army's campaigns until his death.

He established a reputation as an audacious cavalry commander and on two occasions (during the Peninsula campaign and the Maryland campaign) circumnavigated the Union Army of the Potomac, bringing fame to himself and embarrassment to the North. At the Battle of Chancellorsville, he distinguished himself as a temporary commander of the wounded Stonewall Jackson's infantry corps.

Stuart's most famous campaign, the Gettysburg campaign, was flawed when his long separation from Lee's army left Lee unaware of Union troop movements so that Lee was surprised and almost trapped at the Battle of Gettysburg. Stuart received criticism from the Southern press as well as the proponents of the Lost Cause movement after the war. During the 1864 Overland Campaign, Union Maj. Gen. Philip Sheridan's cavalry launched an offensive to defeat Stuart, who was mortally wounded at the Battle of Yellow Tavern.

== Early life and education ==
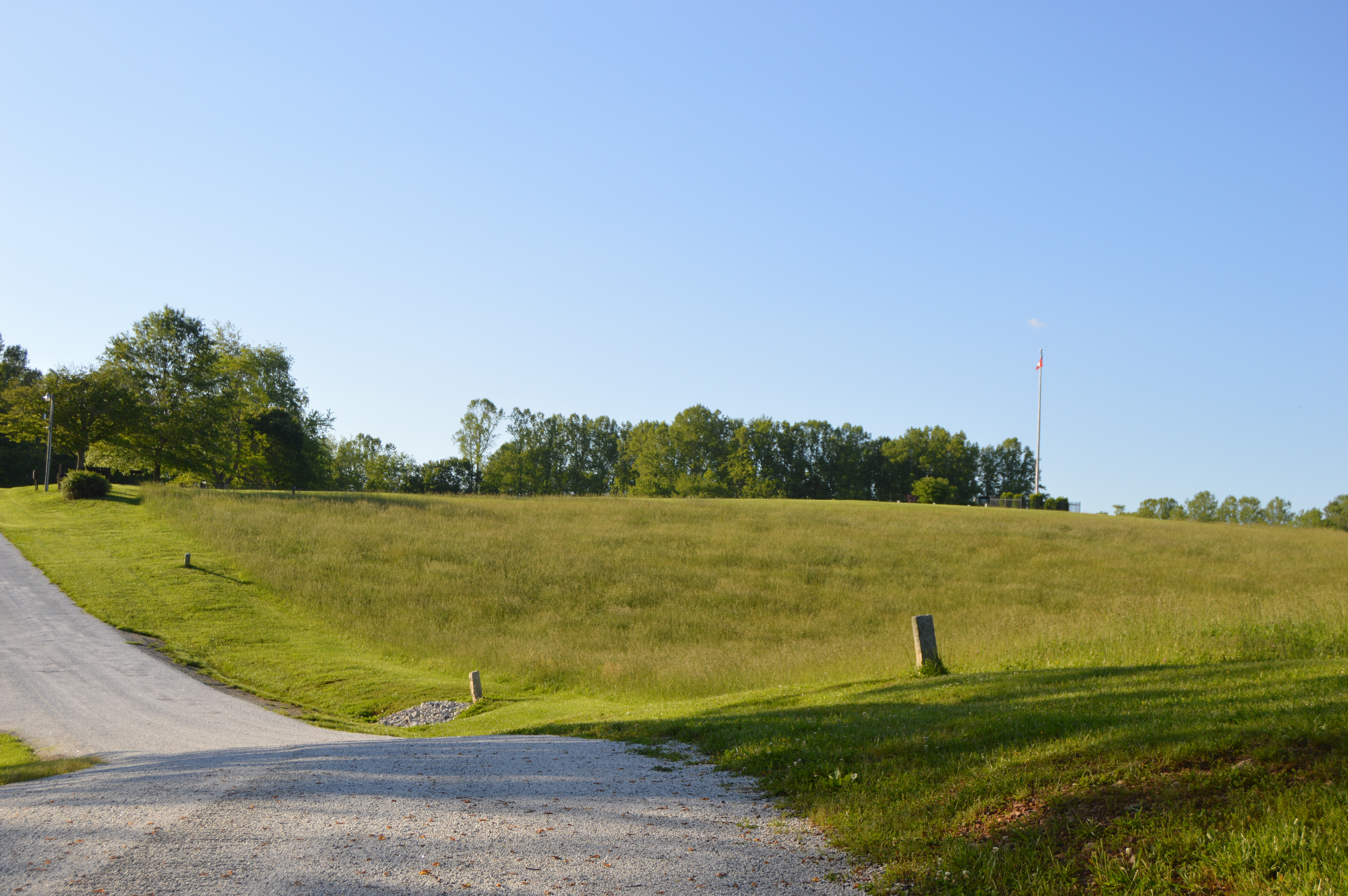
Laurel Hill Farm overview, 2017

Stuart was born at Laurel Hill Farm, a plantation in Patrick County, Virginia, near the border with North Carolina. He was the eighth of 11 children and the youngest of the five sons to survive past early age. His father, Archibald Stuart, was a War of 1812 veteran, slaveholder, attorney, and Democratic politician who represented Patrick County in both houses of the Virginia General Assembly, and also served one term in the United States House of Representatives. His mother, Elizabeth Letcher Pannill Stuart, ran the family farm and was known as a strict religious woman with a good sense for business.

He was of Scottish descent (including some Scots-Irish). His great-grandfather, Major Alexander Stuart, commanded a regiment at the Battle of Guilford Court House during the Revolutionary War. His father Archibald was a cousin of attorney Alexander Hugh Holmes Stuart.

Stuart was educated at home by his mother and tutors until the age of 12, when he left Laurel Hill to be educated by various teachers in Wytheville, Virginia, and at the home of his aunt Anne (Archibald's sister) and her husband, Judge James Ewell Brown (Stuart's namesake), at Danville. He entered Emory and Henry College when he was fifteen, and attended from 1848 to 1850.

During the summer of 1848, Stuart attempted to enlist in the U.S. Army, but was rejected as underaged. He obtained an appointment in 1850 to the United States Military Academy at West Point, New York, from Representative Thomas Hamlet Averett, the man who had defeated his father in the 1848 election. Stuart was a popular student and was happy at the academy. Although he was not handsome in his teen years, his classmates called him by the nickname "Beauty", which they described as his "personal comeliness in inverse ratio to the term employed." He quickly grew a beard after graduation and a fellow officer remarked that he was "the only man he ever saw that [a] beard improved." (Note: He possessed a chin "so short and retiring as positively to disfigure his otherwise fine countenance.")

Robert E. Lee was appointed superintendent of the academy in 1852, and Stuart became a friend of the family, seeing them socially on frequent occasions. Lee's nephew, Fitzhugh Lee, also arrived at the academy in 1852. In Stuart's final year, in addition to achieving the cadet rank of second captain of the corps, he was one of eight cadets designated as honorary "cavalry officers" for his skills in horsemanship. Stuart graduated 13th in his class of 46 in 1854. He ranked 10th in his class in cavalry tactics. Although he enjoyed the civil engineering curriculum at the academy and did well in mathematics, his poor drawing skills hampered his engineering studies, and he finished 29th in that discipline. (Note: A Stuart family tradition says he deliberately degraded his academic performance in his final year to avoid service in the elite, but dull, Corps of Engineers.)

== United States Army ==
Stuart was commissioned a brevet second lieutenant and assigned to the U.S. Regiment of Mounted Riflemen in Texas. After an arduous journey, he reached Fort Davis on January 29, 1855, and was a leader for three months on scouting missions over the San Antonio to El Paso Road. He was soon transferred to the newly formed 1st Cavalry Regiment (1855) at Fort Leavenworth, Kansas Territory, where he became regimental quartermaster and commissary officer under the command of Col. Edwin V. Sumner. He was promoted to first lieutenant in 1855.

=== Marriage ===
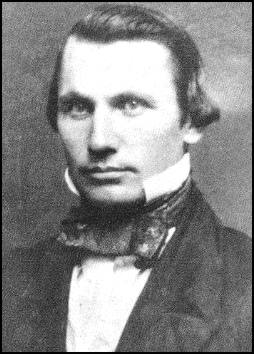
A young Stuart

Also in 1855, Stuart met Flora Cooke, the daughter of the 2nd U.S. Dragoon Regiment's commander, Lieutenant Colonel Philip St. George Cooke. Burke Davis described Flora as "an accomplished horsewoman, and though not pretty, an effective charmer", to whom "Stuart succumbed with hardly a struggle." They became engaged in September, less than two months after meeting. Stuart humorously wrote of his rapid courtship in Latin, "Veni, Vidi, Victus sum" (I came, I saw, I was conquered). Although a gala wedding had been planned for Fort Riley, Kansas, the death of Stuart's father on September 20 caused a change of plans and the marriage on November 14 was small and limited to family witnesses. Their first child, a girl, was born in 1856 but died the same day. On November 14, 1857, Flora gave birth to another daughter, whom the parents named Flora after her mother. The family relocated in early 1858 to Fort Riley, where they remained for three years. The couple owned two slaves until 1859, one inherited from his father's estate, the other purchased.

=== Bleeding Kansas ===
Stuart's leadership capabilities were soon recognized. He was a veteran of the frontier conflicts with Native Americans and the antebellum violence of Bleeding Kansas. He was wounded on July 29, 1857, while fighting at Solomon River, Kansas, against the Cheyenne. Colonel Sumner ordered a charge with drawn sabers against a wave of Native American arrows. Scattering the under-armed warriors, Stuart and three other lieutenants chased one down, whom Stuart wounded in the thigh with his pistol. The Cheyenne turned and fired at Stuart with a .36 caliber Allen & Thurber pepperbox pistol, striking him in the chest with a bullet, which did little more damage than to pierce the skin. Stuart returned in September to Fort Leavenworth and was reunited with his wife.

=== John Brown ===
In 1859, Stuart developed a new piece of cavalry equipment, for which he received patent number 25,684 on October 4: a saber hook, or an "improved method of attaching sabers to belts." The U.S. government paid Stuart $5,000 for a "right to use" license and Stuart contracted with Knorr, Nece and Co. of Philadelphia to manufacture his hook. While in Washington, D.C., to discuss government contracts, and in conjunction with his application for an appointment into the quartermaster department, Stuart heard about John Brown's raid on the U.S. Arsenal at Harpers Ferry. Stuart volunteered to be aide-de-camp to Col. Robert E. Lee and accompanied Lee with a company of U.S. Marines from the Marine Barracks, 8th & I, Washington, DC and four companies of Maryland militia. While delivering Lee's written surrender ultimatum to the leader of the group, who had been calling himself Isaac Smith, Stuart recognized "Old Osawatomie Brown" from his days in Kansas.

=== Resignation ===
Stuart was promoted to captain on April 22, 1861, but resigned from the U.S. Army on May 3, 1861, to join the Confederate States Army following the secession of Virginia. (Note: His letter of resignation, sent from Cairo, Illinois, was accepted by the War Department on May 14.) On June 26, 1860, Flora gave birth to a son, Philip St. George Cooke Stuart. However, the following year, upon learning that his father-in-law, Col. Cooke, would remain in the U.S. Army during the coming civil war, Stuart was so disgusted that he changed his son's name to James Ewell Brown Stuart Jr. ("Jimmie") in late 1861. In a letter addressed to his brother-in-law, John Rogers Cooke (who also joined the CSA, rising to the rank of Confederate Brigadier General), Stuart wrote of his father-in-law's decision to remain loyal to the Union: "He will regret it but once, and that will be continuously." When he heard that George H. Thomas, a fellow Virginian, had also decided to stay with the Union, Stuart wrote "I would like to hang, hang Thomas as a traitor to his native state."

== American Civil War ==
=== Early service ===
[Stuart] is a rare man, wonderfully endowed by nature with the qualities necessary for an officer of light cavalry. ... Calm, firm, acute, active, and enterprising, I know no one more competent than he to estimate the occurrences before him at their true value. If you add to this army a real brigade of cavalry, you can find no better brigadier-general to command it.

— General Joseph E. Johnston, letter to Confederate President Jefferson Davis, August 1861

Stuart was commissioned as a lieutenant colonel of Virginia Infantry in the Confederate Army on May 10, 1861. Major General Robert E. Lee, now commanding the armed forces of Virginia, ordered him to report to Colonel Thomas J. Jackson at Harper's Ferry. Jackson chose to ignore Stuart's infantry designation and assigned him on July 4 to command all the cavalry companies of the Army of the Shenandoah, organized as the 1st Virginia Cavalry Regiment. He was promoted to colonel on July 16.

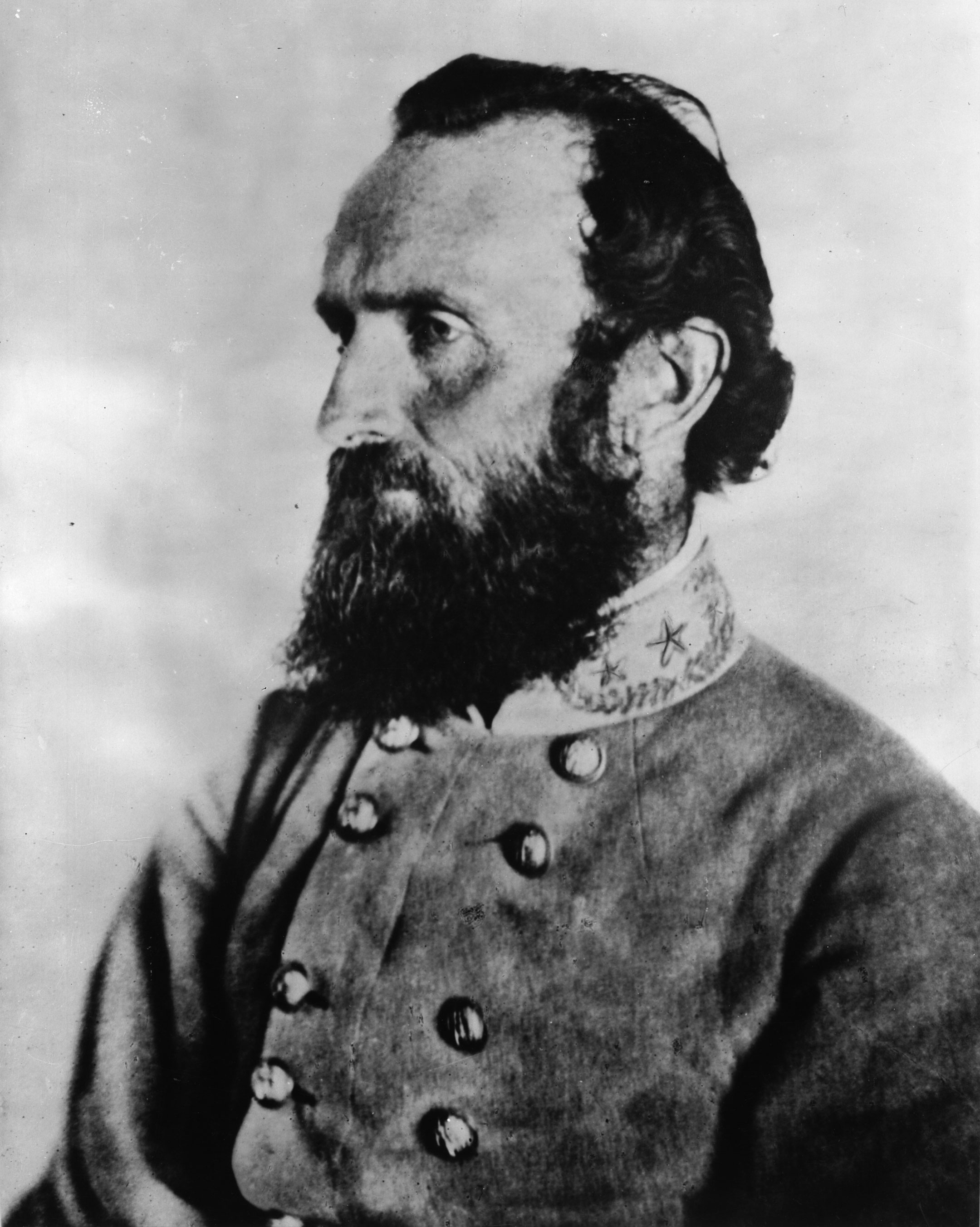
Stonewall Jackson assigned Stuart to cavalry. In this portrait he wears the coat Stuart gifted him.

After early service in the Shenandoah Valley, Stuart led his regiment in the First Battle of Bull Run (where Jackson got his nickname, "Stonewall"), and participated in the pursuit of the retreating Federals, leading to sensationalist reports in the Northern press about the dreaded Confederate "black horse" cavalry. He then commanded the Army's outposts along the upper Potomac River until given command of the cavalry brigade for the army then known as the Army of the Potomac (later named the Army of Northern Virginia). He was promoted to brigadier general on September 24, 1861.

=== Peninsula ===
In 1862, the Union Army of the Potomac began its Peninsula Campaign against Richmond, Virginia, and Stuart's cavalry brigade assisted General Joseph E. Johnston's army as it withdrew up the Virginia Peninsula in the face of superior numbers. Stuart fought at the Battle of Williamsburg, but in general the terrain and weather on the Peninsula did not lend themselves to cavalry operations.

Stuart and Jackson were an unlikely pair: one outgoing, the other introverted; one flashily uniformed, the other plainly dressed; one Prince Rupert and the other Cromwell. Yet Stuart's self-confidence, penchant for action, deep love of Virginia, and total abstinence from such vices as alcohol, tobacco, and pessimism endeared him to Jackson. ... Stuart was the only man in the Confederacy [who] could make Jackson laugh—and who dared to do so.

— James I. Robertson Jr., Stonewall Jackson

However, when General Robert E. Lee became commander of the Army of Northern Virginia, he requested that Stuart perform reconnaissance to determine whether the right flank of the Union army was vulnerable. Stuart set out with 1,200 troopers on the morning of June 12 and, having determined that the flank was indeed vulnerable, took his men on a complete circumnavigation of the Union army, returning after 150 miles on June 15 with 165 captured Union soldiers, 260 horses and mules, and various quartermaster and ordnance supplies. His men met no serious opposition from the more decentralized Union cavalry, coincidentally commanded by his father-in-law, Col. Cooke, and their total casualties amounted to one man killed. The maneuver was a public relations sensation, and Stuart was greeted with flower petals thrown in his path at Richmond. He had become as famous as Stonewall Jackson in the eyes of the Confederacy.

=== Northern Virginia ===
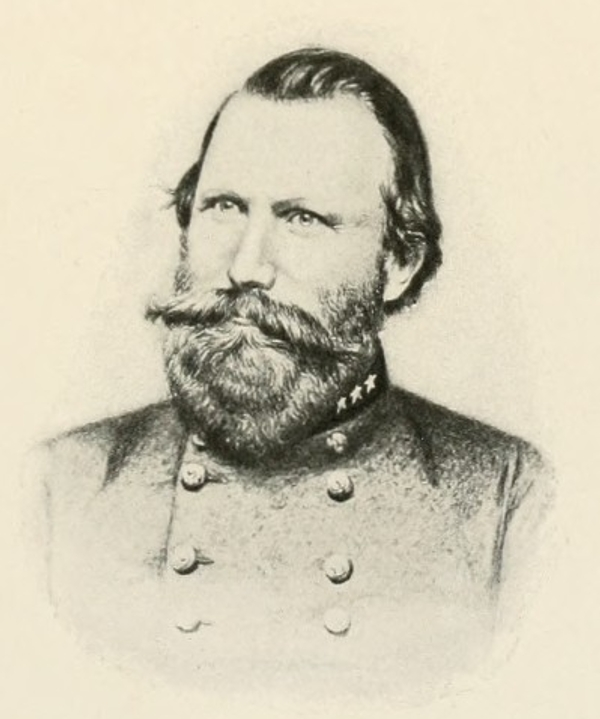
CSA Cavalry General J. E. B. Stuart

Early in the Northern Virginia Campaign, Stuart was promoted to major general on July 25, 1862, and his command was upgraded to the Cavalry Division—the fact that the Army of Northern Virginia's cavalry had been brigaded and were now a full division made for an important organizational advantage over the Army of the Potomac's mounted arm, which was ineffectually organized as regiments attached to infantry brigades and treated as an extension of the army signal corps. He was nearly captured and lost his signature plumed hat and cloak to pursuing Federals during a raid in August, but in a retaliatory raid at Catlett's Station the following day, managed to overrun Union army commander Major General John Pope's headquarters, and not only captured Pope's full dress uniform, but also intercepted orders that provided Lee with valuable intelligence concerning reinforcements for Pope's army.

At the Second Battle of Bull Run (Second Manassas), Stuart's cavalry followed the massive assault by Longstreet's infantry against Pope's army, protecting its flank with artillery batteries. Stuart ordered Brigadier General Beverly Robertson's brigade to pursue the Federals and in a sharp fight against Brigadier General John Buford's brigade, Colonel Thomas T. Munford's 2nd Virginia Cavalry was overwhelmed until Stuart sent in two more regiments as reinforcements. Buford's men, many of whom were new to combat, retreated across Lewis's Ford and Stuart's troopers captured over 300 of them. Stuart's men harassed the retreating Union columns until the campaign ended at the Battle of Chantilly.

=== Maryland ===
During the Maryland Campaign in September 1862, Stuart's cavalry screened the army's movement north. He bears some responsibility for Robert E. Lee's lack of knowledge of the position and celerity of the pursuing Army of the Potomac under George B. McClellan. For a five-day period, Stuart rested his men and entertained local civilians at a gala ball at Urbana, Maryland. His reports make no reference to intelligence gathering by his scouts or patrols. As the Union Army drew near to Lee's divided army, Stuart's men skirmished at various points on the approach to Frederick and Stuart was not able to keep his brigades concentrated enough to resist the oncoming tide. He misjudged the Union routes of advance, ignorant of the Union force threatening Turner's Gap, and required assistance from the infantry of Major General D. H. Hill to defend the South Mountain passes in the Battle of South Mountain. His horse artillery bombarded the flank of the Union army as it opened its attack in the Battle of Antietam. By mid-afternoon, Stonewall Jackson ordered Stuart to command a turning movement with his cavalry against the Union right flank and rear, which, if successful, would be followed up by an infantry attack from the West Woods. Stuart began probing the Union lines with more artillery barrages, but these were answered with "murderous" counterbattery fire, and consequently the cavalry movement intended by Jackson was never launched.

Three weeks after Lee's army had withdrawn back to Virginia, from October 10–12, 1862, Stuart performed another of his audacious circumnavigations of the Army of the Potomac, the Chambersburg Raid — travelling 126 miles in under 60 hours, from Darkesville, West Virginia to as far north as Mercersburg and Chambersburg, Pennsylvania, around to the east through Emmitsburg, Maryland, and then south through Hyattstown, Maryland and White's Ford to Leesburg, Virginia — once again embarrassing his Union opponents and seizing horses and supplies, but at the expense of exhausting his men and animals, and without gaining much military advantage. Jubal Early referred to it as "the greatest horse stealing expedition", and that it only "annoyed" the enemy. Stuart gave his friend Jackson a fine, new officer's tunic, trimmed with gold lace, commissioned from a Richmond tailor, which he thought would give Jackson more of the appearance of a proper general (something to which Jackson was notoriously indifferent).

Urged by President Lincoln to pursue Lee, McClellan slowly pushed his army south, crossing the Potomac starting on October 26. As Lee began moving to counter this, Stuart screened Longstreet's corps and skirmished numerous times in early November against Union cavalry and infantry around Mountville, Aldie, and Upperville. On November 6, Stuart was notified by telegram that his daughter Flora had died of typhoid fever on November 3, just before her fifth birthday.

=== Fredericksburg and Chancellorsville ===
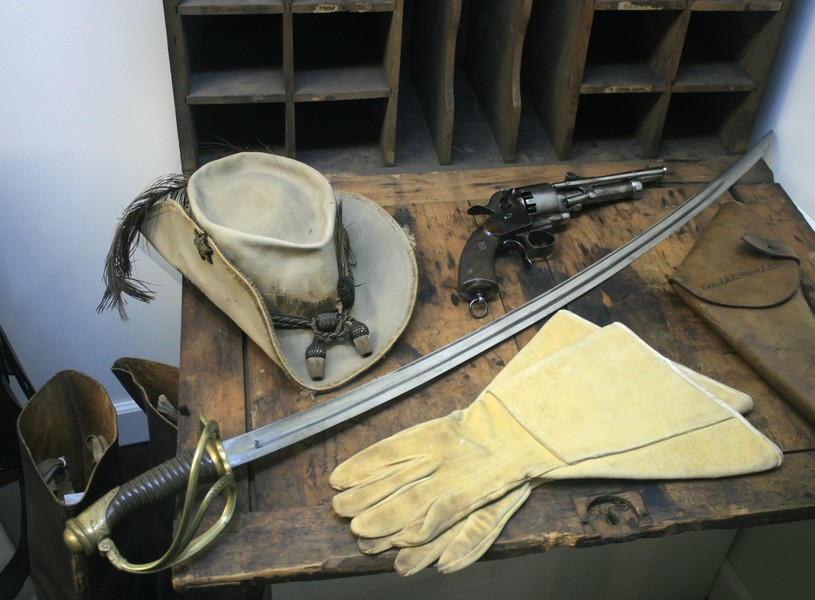
Stuart's hat, sword and LeMat Revolver (Museum of the Confederacy, Richmond, VA)

In the December 1862 Battle of Fredericksburg, Stuart and his cavalry—most notably his horse artillery under Major John Pelham—protected Stonewall Jackson's flank at Hamilton's Crossing. General Lee commended his cavalry, which "effectually guarded our right, annoying the enemy and embarrassing his movements by hanging on his flank, and attacking when the opportunity occurred." Stuart reported to Flora the next day that he had been shot through his fur collar but was unhurt.

After Christmas, Lee ordered Stuart to conduct a raid north of the Rappahannock River to "penetrate the enemy's rear, ascertain if possible his position & movements, & inflict upon him such damage as circumstances will permit." With 1,800 troopers and a horse artillery battery assigned to the operation, Stuart's raid reached as far north as four miles south of Fairfax Court House, seizing 250 prisoners, horses, mules, and supplies. Tapping telegraph lines, his signalmen intercepted messages between Union commanders, and Stuart sent a personal telegram to Union Quartermaster General Montgomery C. Meigs, "General Meigs will in the future please furnish better mules; those you have furnished recently are very inferior."

On March 17, 1863, Stuart's cavalry clashed with a Union raiding party at Kelly's Ford. The minor victory was marred by the death of Major Pelham, which caused Stuart profound grief, as he thought of him as close as a younger brother. He wrote to a Confederate congressman, "The noble, the chivalric, the gallant Pelham is no more. ... Let the tears of agony we have shed, and the gloom of mourning throughout my command bear witness." Flora was pregnant at the time and Stuart told her that if it were a boy, he wanted him to be named John Pelham Stuart. (Virginia Pelham Stuart was born October 9.)

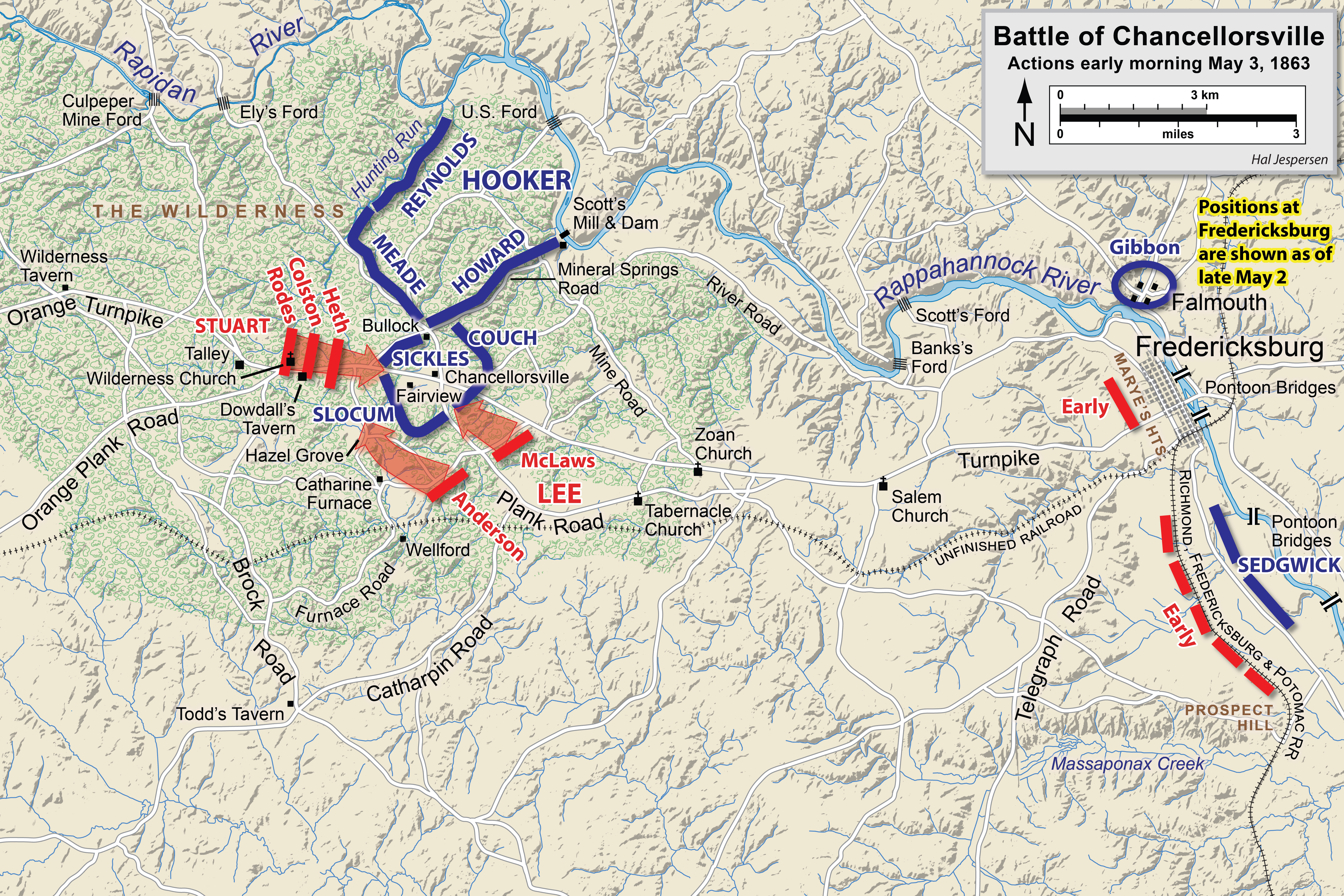
Chancellorsville, May 3, 1863 Confederate/Rebels Union/Federals

At the Battle of Chancellorsville, Stuart accompanied Stonewall Jackson on his famous flanking march of May 2, 1863, and started to pursue the retreating soldiers of the Union XI Corps when he received word that both Jackson and his senior division commander, Major General A. P. Hill, had been wounded. Hill, bypassing the next most senior infantry general in the corps, Brigadier General Robert E. Rodes, sent a message ordering Stuart to take command of the Second Corps. Although the delays associated with this change of command effectively ended the flanking attack on the night of May 2, Stuart, who had no prior experience leading infantry, performed creditably as an infantry corps commander the following day, launching a strong and well-coordinated attack against the Union right flank at Chancellorsville. When Union troops abandoned Hazel Grove, Stuart had the presence of mind to quickly occupy it and bombard the Union positions with artillery. Stuart relinquished his infantry command on May 6 when Hill returned to duty. Historian Stephen W. Sears wrote:

It is hard to see how Jeb Stuart, in a new command, a cavalryman commanding infantry and artillery for the first time, could have done a better job. The astute Porter Alexander believed all credit was due: "Altogether, I do not think there was a more brilliant thing done in the war than Stuart's extricating that command from the extremely critical position in which he found it.

Stonewall Jackson died on May 10. Stuart was once again devastated by the loss of a close friend, telling his staff that the death was a "national calamity." Jackson's wife, Mary Anna, wrote to Stuart on August 1, thanking him for a note of sympathy: "I need not assure you of which you already know, that your friendship & admiration were cordially reciprocated by him. I have frequently heard him speak of Gen'l Stuart as one of his warm personal friends, & also express admiration for your Soldierly qualities."

=== Brandy Station ===
The grand review of June 5 was surely the proudest day of Jeb Stuart's thirty years. As he led a cavalcade of resplendent staff officers to the reviewing stand, trumpeters heralded his coming and women and girls strewed his path with flowers. Before all of the spectators the assembled cavalry brigade stretched a mile and a half. After Stuart and his entourage galloped past the line in review, the troopers in their turn saluted the reviewing stand in columns of squadrons. In performing a second "march past", the squadrons started off at a trot, then spurred to a gallop. Drawing sabers and breaking into the Rebel yell, the troopers rush toward the horse artillery drawn up in battery. The gunners responded defiantly, firing blank charges. Amidst this tumult of cannon fire and thundering hooves, a number of ladies swooned in their escorts' arms.

— Stephen W. Sears, Gettysburg

Returning to the cavalry for the Gettysburg campaign, Stuart endured two of the lowest points in his career, starting with the Battle of Brandy Station, the largest predominantly cavalry engagement of the war. By June 5, two of Lee's infantry corps were camped in and around Culpeper. Six miles northeast, holding the line of the Rappahannock River, Stuart bivouacked his cavalry troopers, mostly near Brandy Station, screening the Confederate Army against surprise by the enemy. Stuart requested a full field review of his troops by General Lee. This grand review on June 5 included nearly 9,000 mounted troopers and four batteries of horse artillery, charging in simulated battle at Inlet Station, about two miles (three km) southwest of Brandy Station.

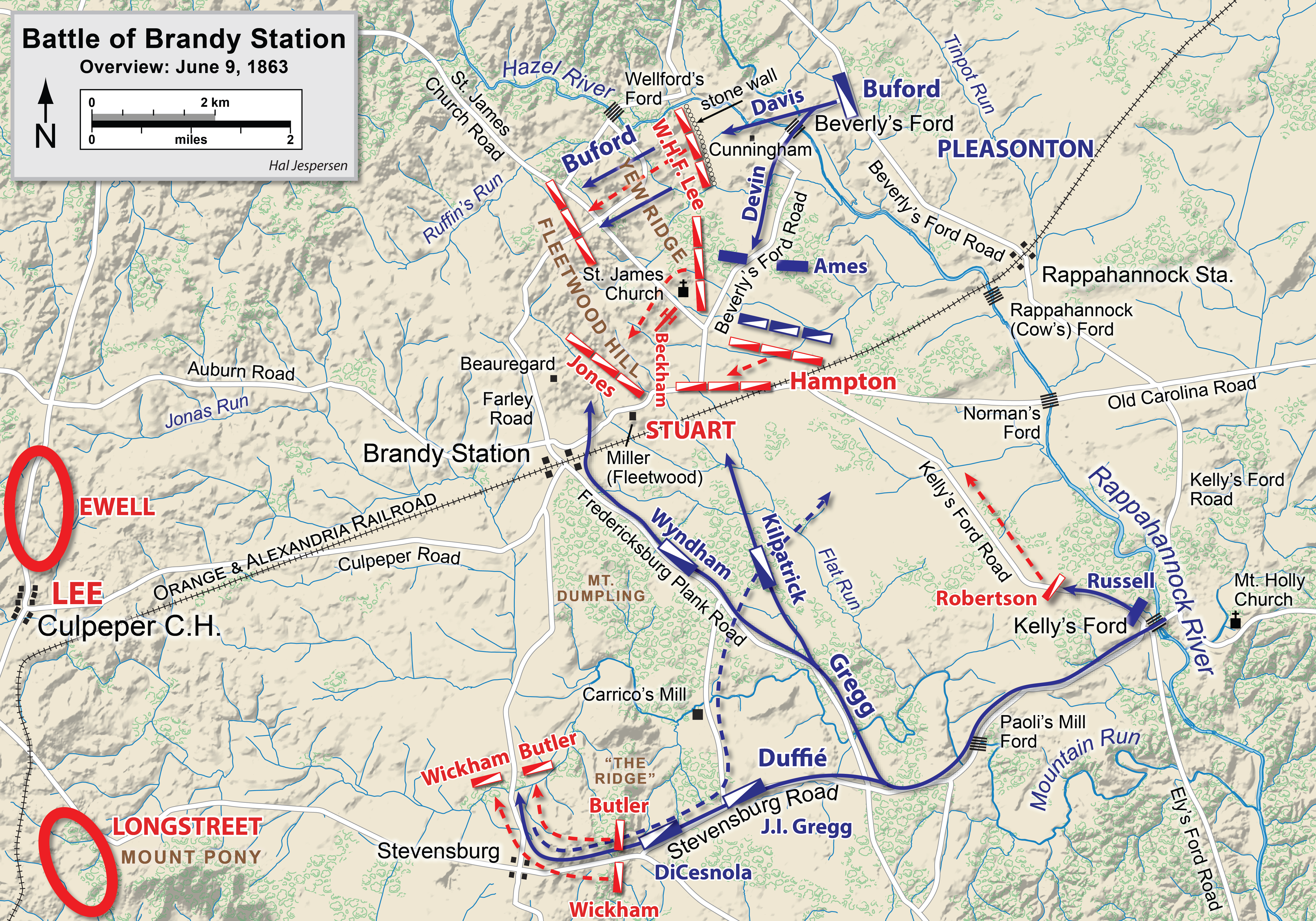
Battle of Brandy Station, June 9, 1863

Lee was not able to attend the review, however, so it was repeated in his presence on June 8, although the repeated performance was limited to a simple parade without battle simulations. Despite the lower level of activity, some of the cavalrymen and the newspaper reporters at the scene complained that all Stuart was doing was feeding his ego and exhausting the horses. Lee ordered Stuart to cross the Rappahannock the next day and raid Union forward positions, screening the Confederate Army from observation or interference as it moved north. Anticipating this imminent offensive action, Stuart ordered his tired troopers back into bivouac around Brandy Station.

The Army of the Potomac commander, Major General Joseph Hooker, interpreted Stuart's presence around Culpeper to be indicative of preparations for a raid on his army's supply lines. In reaction, he ordered his cavalry commander, Major General Alfred Pleasonton, to take a combined arms force of 8,000 cavalrymen and 3,000 infantry on a "spoiling raid" to "disperse and destroy" the 9,500 Confederates. Pleasonton's force crossed the Rappahannock in two columns on June 9, 1863, the first crossing at Beverly's Ford (Brigadier General John Buford's division) catching Stuart by surprise, waking him and his staff to the sound of gunfire. The second crossing, at Kelly's Ford, surprised Stuart again, and the Confederates found themselves assaulted from front and rear in a spirited melee of mounted combat. A series of confusing charges and countercharges swept back and forth across Fleetwood Hill, which had been Stuart's headquarters the previous night. After ten hours of fighting, Pleasonton ordered his men to withdraw across the Rappahannock.

If Gen. Stuart is to be the eyes and ears of the army we advise him to see more, and be seen less. ... Gen. Stuart has suffered no little in public estimation by the late enterprises of the enemy.

— Richmond Enquirer, June 12, 1863

Although Stuart claimed a victory because the Confederates held the field, Brandy Station is considered a tactical draw, and both sides came up short. Pleasonton was not able to disable Stuart's force at the start of an important campaign, and he withdrew before finding the location of Lee's infantry nearby. However, the fact that the Southern cavalry had not detected the movement of two large columns of Union cavalry, and that they subsequently fell victim to a surprise attack, was an embarrassment that prompted serious criticism from fellow generals and the Southern press. The fight also revealed the increased competency of the Union cavalry, and foreshadowed the decline of the formerly invincible Southern mounted arm.

=== Stuart's ride in the Gettysburg Campaign ===
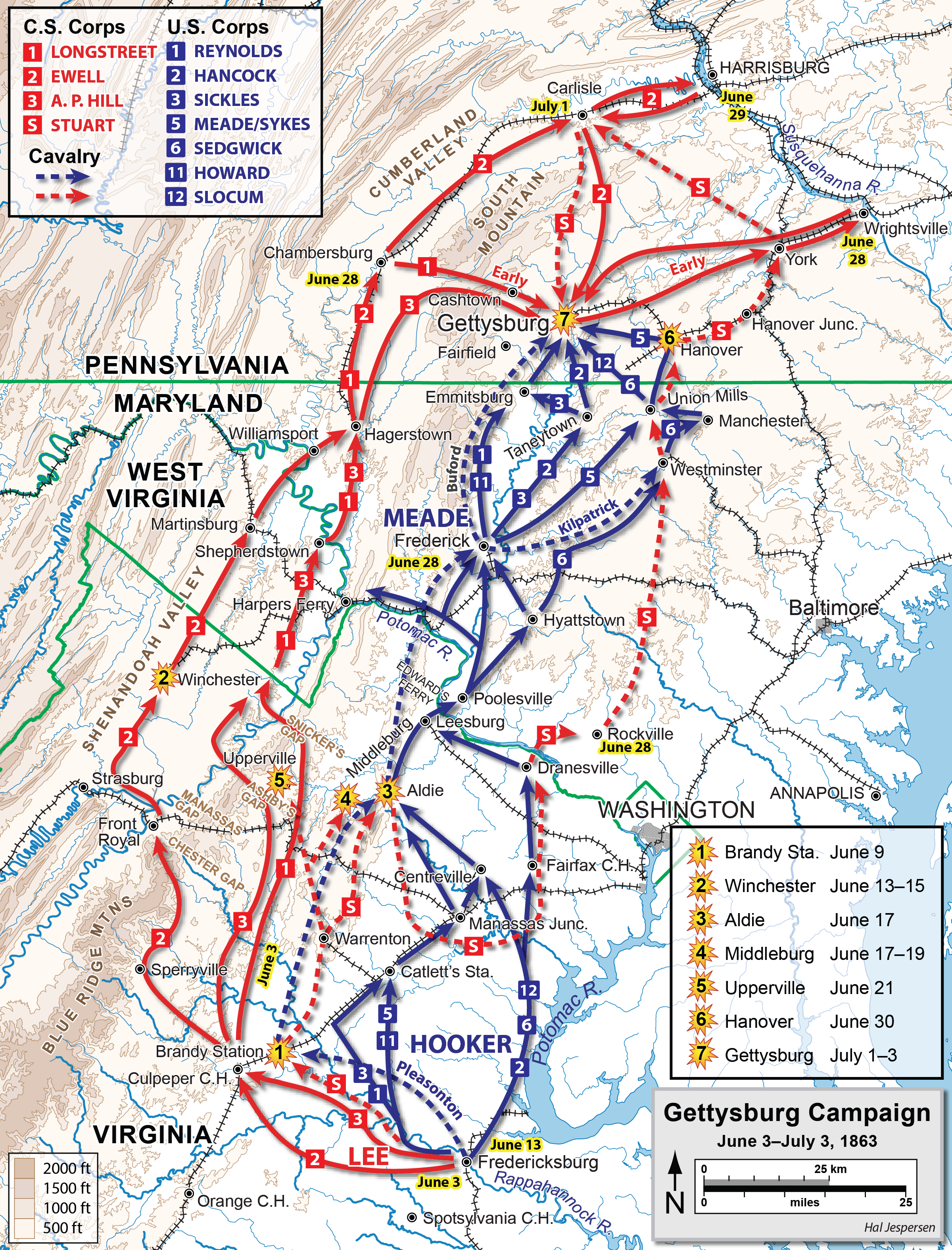
Stuart's ride (shown with a red dotted line) during the Gettysburg campaign, June 3 – July 3, 1863

Following a series of small cavalry battles in June as Lee's army began marching north through the Shenandoah Valley, Stuart may have had in mind the glory of circumnavigating the enemy army once again, desiring to erase the stain on his reputation of the surprise at Brandy Station. General Lee gave orders to Stuart on June 22 on how he was to participate in the march north. The exact nature of those orders has been the subject of argument by the participants and historians ever since, but the consensus is that, in essence, Stuart was instructed to guard the mountain passes with part of his force while the Army of Northern Virginia was still south of the Potomac, and that he was to cross the river with the remainder of the army and screen the right flank of Lieutenant General Richard S. Ewell's Second Corps. However, instead of taking a direct route north near the Blue Ridge Mountains, Stuart chose to reach Ewell's flank by taking his three best brigades (those of Brigadier General Wade Hampton, Brigadier General Fitzhugh Lee, and Colonel John R. Chambliss, the latter replacing the wounded Brigadier General W. H. F. "Rooney" Lee) between the Union Army and Washington, moving north through Rockville to Westminster, Maryland and on into Pennsylvania, hoping to capture supplies along the way and cause havoc near the enemy capital. Stuart and his three brigades departed Salem Depot at 1 a.m. on June 25.

Unfortunately for Stuart's plan, the Union army's movement was already underway, and his proposed route was blocked by columns of Federal infantry, forcing him to veer farther to the east than either he or General Lee had anticipated. This prevented Stuart from linking up with Ewell as ordered and deprived Lee of the use of his prime cavalry force, the "eyes and ears" of the army, while advancing into unfamiliar enemy territory.

Stuart's command crossed the Potomac River at 3 a.m. on June 28. At Rockville they captured a wagon train of 140 brand-new, fully loaded wagons and mule teams. This wagon train would prove to be a logistical hindrance to Stuart's advance, but he interpreted Lee's orders as placing importance on gathering supplies. The proximity of the Confederate raiders provoked some consternation in Washington, and two Union cavalry brigades and an artillery battery were sent to pursue the Confederates. Stuart supposedly said that, were it not for his fatigued horses, "he would have marched down the 7th Street Road [and] took Abe & Cabinet prisoners."

On June 29, Stuart's men clashed briefly with and overwhelmed two companies of Union cavalry in Westminster, chasing them a significant distance down the Baltimore road, which Stuart claimed caused a "great panic" in the city itself. The head of Stuart's column encountered Brigadier General Judson Kilpatrick's cavalry as it passed through Hanover and scattered it on June 30; the Battle of Hanover ended after Kilpatrick's men regrouped and drove the Confederates out of town. Stuart's brigades had been better positioned to guard their captured wagon train than to take advantage of the encounter with Kilpatrick. After a 20-mile trek in the dark, his exhausted men reached Dover on the morning of July 1, as the Battle of Gettysburg was commencing without them.

Stuart headed next for Carlisle, hoping to find Ewell. He lobbed a few shells into town during the early evening of July 1 and burned the Carlisle Barracks before withdrawing to the south towards Gettysburg. He and the bulk of his command reached Lee at Gettysburg the afternoon of July 2. He ordered Wade Hampton to cover the left rear of the Confederate battle lines, and Hampton fought against Brigadier General George Armstrong Custer at the Battle of Hunterstown before joining Stuart at Gettysburg.

=== Gettysburg and its aftermath ===
When Stuart arrived at Gettysburg on the afternoon of July 2—bringing with him the caravan of captured Union supply wagons—he received a rare rebuke from Lee. No one witnessed the private meeting between Lee and Stuart, but reports circulated at headquarters that Lee's greeting was "abrupt and frosty." Colonel Edward Porter Alexander wrote, "Although Lee said only, 'Well, General, you are here at last,' his manner implied rebuke, and it was so understood by Stuart." On the final day of the battle, Stuart was ordered to move into the enemy's rear and disrupt their lines of communications at the same time as Pickett's Charge was being sent against the Union positions on Cemetery Ridge, but his attack on East Cavalry Field was repelled by Union cavalry under Brigadier Generals David Gregg and George Custer.

During the retreat from Gettysburg, Stuart devoted his full attention to supporting the army's movement, successfully screening it from the aggressive Union cavalry forces in pursuit, and escorting thousands of wagons with wounded men and captured supplies over difficult roads and through inclement weather to safety. Numerous skirmishes and minor battles occurred during the screening and delaying actions of the retreat. Stuart's men were the final units to cross the Potomac River, returning to Virginia in "wretched condition—completely worn out and broken down."

The failure to crush the Federal army in Pennsylvania in 1863, in the opinion of almost all of the officers of the Army of Northern Virginia, can be expressed in five words—the absence of the cavalry.

— Confederate Maj. Gen. Henry Heth

The Gettysburg campaign was the most controversial of Stuart's career. He became one of the scapegoats (along with James Longstreet) who was blamed for Lee's loss at Gettysburg by proponents of the postbellum Lost Cause movement, such as Jubal Early. This was fueled in part by opinions of less partisan writers, such as Stuart's subordinate, Thomas L. Rosser, who stated after the war that Stuart did, "on this campaign, undoubtedly, make the fatal blunder which lost us the battle of Gettysburg." In Lee's report on the campaign, he wrote:

[T]he absence of the cavalry rendered it impossible to obtain accurate information. ... By the route [Stuart] pursued, the Federal Army was interposed between his command and our main body, preventing any communication with him until his arrival at Carlisle. The march toward Gettysburg was conducted more slowly than it would have been had the movements of the Federal Army been known.

One of the most forceful postbellum defenses of Stuart was by Colonel John S. Mosby, who had served under him during the campaign and was fiercely loyal to the late general, writing, "He made me all that I was in the war. ... But for his friendship I would never have been heard of." He wrote numerous articles for popular publications and published a book-length treatise in 1908, a work in which he drew on his skills as a lawyer to categorically rebut all of the claims laid against Stuart.

Historians remain divided as to the significance of Stuart's failure to keep Lee informed, and to what extent this helped contribute to the Army of Northern Virginia's defeat at Gettysburg. Edward G. Longacre argues that Lee deliberately gave Stuart wide discretion in his orders. Edwin B. Coddington refers to the "tragedy" of Stuart in the Gettysburg campaign, and judges that when Fitzhugh Lee raised the question of "whether Stuart exercised the discretion undoubtedly given to him, judiciously", the answer was no. Agreeing that Stuart's absence permitted Lee to be surprised at Gettysburg, Coddington points out that the Union commander was just as surprised. Eric J. Wittenberg and J. David Petruzzi have concluded that there was "plenty of blame to go around", and that the responsibility should be divided between Stuart, the lack of specificity in Lee's orders, and the behaviour of Lieutenant General Ewell, who might have tried harder to link up with Stuart northeast of Gettysburg. Jeffry D. Wert acknowledges that Lee and his officers bear the primary responsibility for the Confederate loss at Gettysburg, whilst also recognizing the skilful and determined performance of the Army of the Potomac, but states that ultimately "Stuart failed Lee and the army in the reckoning at Gettysburg. ... Lee trusted him and gave him discretion, but Stuart acted injudiciously."

Although Stuart was not rebuked or disciplined in any official manner for his role in the Gettysburg campaign, it is noteworthy that his appointment to corps command on September 9, 1863, did not carry with it a promotion to lieutenant general. Edward Bonekemper wrote that since all other corps commanders in the Army of Northern Virginia carried this rank, Lee's decision to keep Stuart at the rank of major general, while at the same time promoting Stuart's subordinates Wade Hampton and Fitzhugh Lee to major generals, could be considered an implied rebuke. Wert wrote that there is no evidence Lee considered Stuart's performance during the Gettysburg campaign, and that it is "more likely that Lee thought the responsibilities in command of a cavalry corps did not equal those of an infantry corps."

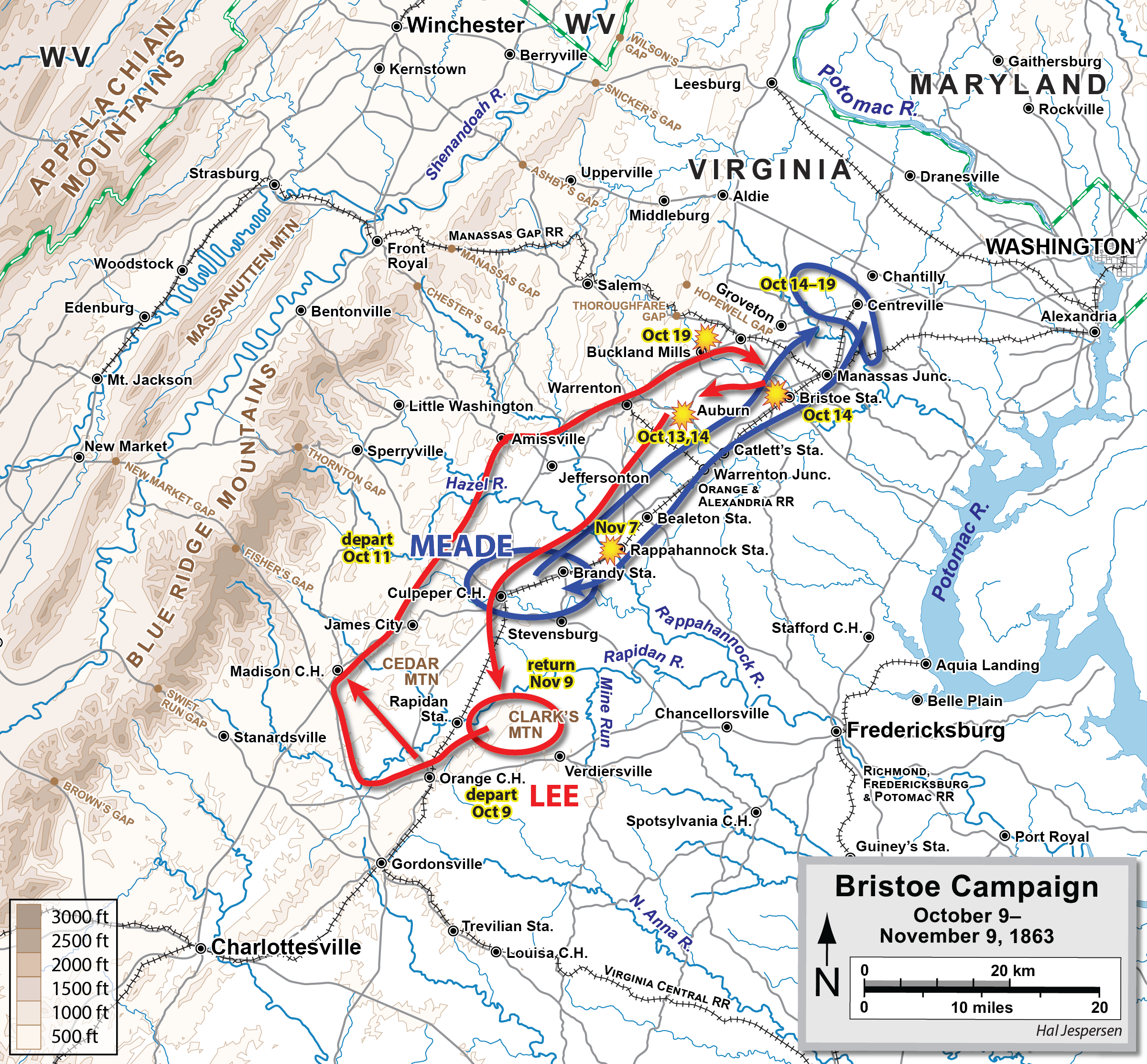
Bristoe Campaign

=== Fall 1863 and the 1864 Overland Campaign ===
Lee reorganized his cavalry on September 9, creating a Cavalry Corps for Stuart with two divisions of three brigades each. In the Bristoe Campaign, Stuart was assigned to lead a broad turning movement in an attempt to get into the enemy's rear, but General Meade skillfully withdrew his army without leaving Stuart any opportunities to take advantage of. On October 13, Stuart blundered into the rear guard of the Union III Corps near Warrenton, resulting in the First Battle of Auburn.

[The cavalry's success in the Bristoe Campaign can be attributed] to the generalship, boldness, and untiring energy of Major-General Stuart, for it was he who directed every movement of importance, and his generalship, boldness, and energy won the unbounded confidence of officers and men, and gave the prestige of success.

— Confederate Colonel Oliver Funsten

Ewell's corps was sent to rescue him, but Stuart hid his troopers in a wooded ravine until the unsuspecting III Corps moved on, and the assistance was not necessary. As Meade withdrew towards Manassas Junction, brigades from the Union II Corps fought a rearguard action against Stuart's cavalry and the infantry of Brigadier General Harry Hays's division near Auburn on October 14. Stuart's cavalry boldly bluffed Warren's infantry and escaped disaster. After the Confederate repulse at Bristoe Station and an aborted advance on Centreville, Stuart's cavalry shielded the withdrawal of Lee's army from the vicinity of Manassas Junction. Judson Kilpatrick's Union cavalry pursued Stuart's cavalry along the Warrenton Turnpike, but were lured into an ambush near Chestnut Hill and routed. The Federal troopers were scattered and chased five miles (eight km) in an affair that came to be known as the "Buckland Races". The Southern press began to mute its criticism of Stuart following his successful performance during the fall campaign.

The 1864 Overland Campaign, including the Battle of Yellow Tavern

The Overland Campaign, Lieutenant General Ulysses S. Grant's offensive against Lee in the spring of 1864, began at the Battle of the Wilderness, where Stuart aggressively pushed Thomas L. Rosser's Laurel Brigade into a fight against George Custer's better-armed Michigan Brigade, resulting in significant losses. General Lee sent a message to Stuart: "It is very important to save your Cavalry & not wear it out. ... You must use your good judgment to make any attack which may offer advantages." As the armies maneuvered toward their next confrontation at Spotsylvania Court House, Stuart's cavalry fought delaying actions against the Union cavalry. His defense at Laurel Hill, also directing the infantry of Brigadier General Joseph B. Kershaw, skillfully delayed the advance of the Federal army for nearly five critical hours.

=== Yellow Tavern and death ===
The commander of the Army of the Potomac, Major General George Meade, and his cavalry commander, Major General Philip Sheridan, quarreled about the Union cavalry's performance in the first two engagements of the Overland Campaign. Sheridan heatedly asserted that he wanted to "concentrate all of cavalry, move out in force against Stuart's command, and whip it." Meade reported the comments to Grant, who replied, "Did Sheridan say that? Well, he generally knows what he is talking about. Let him start right out and do it." Sheridan immediately organized a raid against Confederate supply and railroad lines close to Richmond, which he knew would bring Stuart to battle.

Sheridan moved aggressively to the southeast, crossing the North Anna River and seizing Beaver Dam Station on the Virginia Central Railroad, where his men captured a train, liberating 3,000 Union prisoners and destroying more than one million rations and medical supplies destined for Lee's army. Stuart dispatched a force of about 3,000 cavalrymen to intercept Sheridan's cavalry, which was more than three times their numbers. As he rode in pursuit, accompanied by his aide, Major Andrew R. Venable, they were able to stop briefly along the way to be greeted by Stuart's wife, Flora, and his children, Jimmie and Virginia. Venable wrote of Stuart, "He told me he never expected to live through the war, and that if we were conquered, that he did not want to live."

The Battle of Yellow Tavern took place on May 11 at an abandoned inn located six miles (9.7 km) north of Richmond. The Confederate troops resisted from the low ridgeline bordering the road to Richmond, fighting for over three hours. After receiving a scouting report from Texas Jack Omohundro, Stuart led a countercharge and pushed the advancing Union troopers back from the hilltop. Stuart, on horseback, shouted encouragement from in front of Company K of the 1st Virginia Cavalry while firing his revolver at the Union troopers.

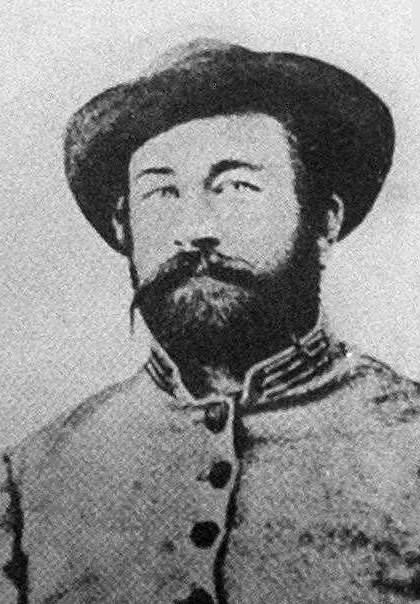
Lieutenant Colonel Gus W. Dorsey

As the 5th Michigan Cavalry streamed in retreat past Stuart, a dismounted Union private, 44-year-old John A. Huff, turned and shot Stuart with his .44-caliber revolver from a distance of 10–30 yards. The large caliber round cut through Stuart's abdomen and exited an inch to the right of his spine. Stuart fell into the arms of Company K's commander, Gus W. Dorsey. Dorsey caught him and took him from his horse. Stuart told him: "Dorsey...save your men." Dorsey refused to leave him and brought Stuart to the rear.

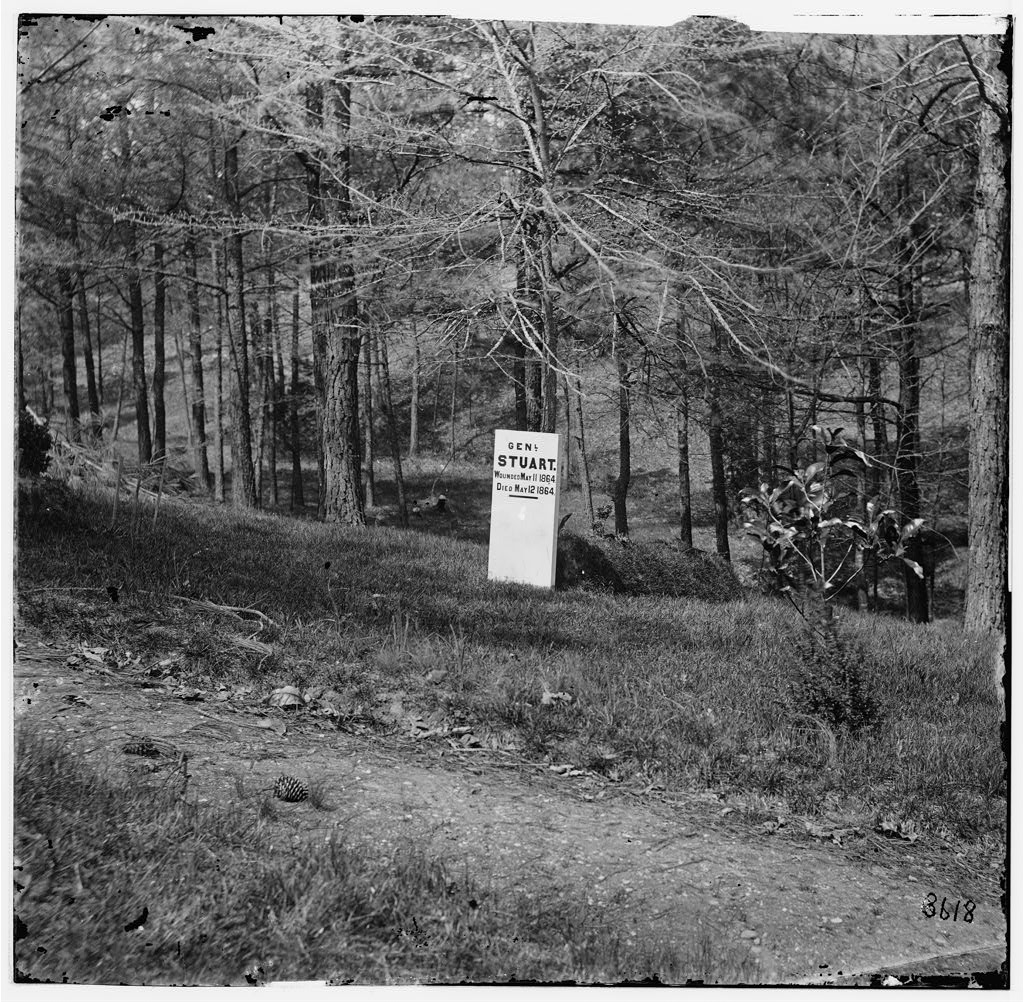
Stuart's gravesite after the war, with temporary marker

Stuart suffered great pain as an ambulance took him to Richmond to await his wife's arrival at the home of Dr. Charles Brewer, his brother-in-law. As he was being driven from the field in an ambulance wagon, Stuart noticed disorganized ranks of retreating men and called out to them his last words on the battlefield: "Go back, go back, and do your duty, as I have done mine, and our country will be safe. Go back, go back! I had rather die than be whipped."

Stuart ordered his sword and spurs be given to his son. As his aide Major McClellan left his side, Confederate President Jefferson Davis came in, took Stuart's hand, and asked, "General, how do you feel?" Stuart answered "Easy, but willing to die, if God and my country think I have fulfilled my destiny and done my duty." His last whispered words were: "I am resigned; God's will be done."

He died at 7:38 p.m. on May 12, the following day, before Flora Stuart reached his side. He was 31 years old. Stuart was buried in Richmond's Hollywood Cemetery. Upon learning of Stuart's death, General Lee is reported to have said that he could hardly keep from weeping at the mere mention of Stuart's name and that Stuart had never given him a bad piece of information. John Huff, the private who had fatally wounded Stuart, was killed in action just a few weeks later at the Battle of Haw's Shop.

Flora wore the black of mourning for the remainder of her life, and never remarried. She lived in Saltville, Virginia, for 15 years after the war, where she opened and taught at a school in a log cabin. She worked from 1880 to 1898 as principal of the Virginia Female Institute in Staunton, Virginia, a position for which Robert E. Lee had recommended her before his death ten years earlier. In 1907, the institute was renamed Stuart Hall School in her honor. Upon the death of her daughter Virginia, from complications in childbirth in 1898, Flora resigned from the institute and moved to Norfolk, Virginia, where she helped Virginia's widower, Robert Page Waller, in raising her grandchildren.

She died in Norfolk on May 10, 1923, after striking her head in a fall on a city sidewalk. She is buried alongside her husband and their daughter, Little Flora, in Hollywood Cemetery in Richmond.

== Legacy and memorials ==
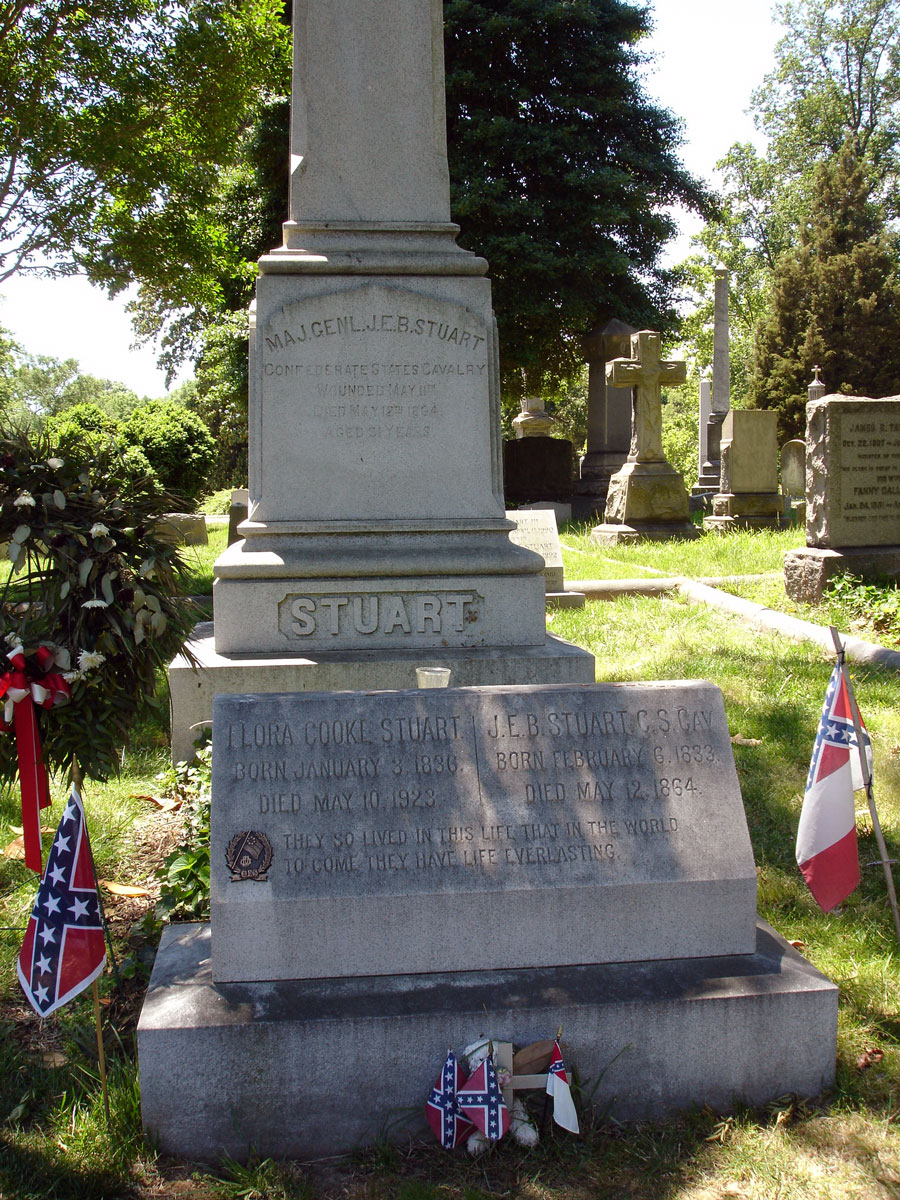
Gravesite of Jeb and Flora Stuart, Hollywood Cemetery

Like his intimate friend, Stonewall Jackson, General J. E. B. Stuart was a legendary figure and is considered, excepting for Phil Sheridan, to be one of the greatest cavalry commanders in American history. His friend from his federal army days, Union Major General John Sedgwick, said that Stuart was "the greatest cavalry officer ever foaled in America." Jackson and Stuart, both of whom were killed in battle, had colorful public images, although the latter's seems to have been more deliberately crafted. Wert wrote about Stuart:

Stuart had been the Confederacy's knight-errant, the bold and dashing cavalier, attired in a resplendent uniform, plumed hat, and cape. Amid a slaughterhouse, he had embodied chivalry, clinging to the pageantry of a long-gone warrior. He crafted the image carefully, and the image befitted him. He saw himself as the Southern people envisaged him. They needed a knight; he needed to be that knight.

Stuart's birthplace, Laurel Hill, located in Patrick County, Virginia, was purchased by the J.E.B. Stuart Birthplace Preservation Trust, Inc., in 1992 to preserve and interpret it. In December 2006, a personal Confederate battle flag, sewn by Flora Stuart, was sold in a Heritage Auction for $956,000 (including buyer's premium), a world-record price for any Confederate flag. The 34-inch by 34-inch flag was hand-sewn for Stuart by Flora in 1862, and Stuart carried it into some of his most famous battles.

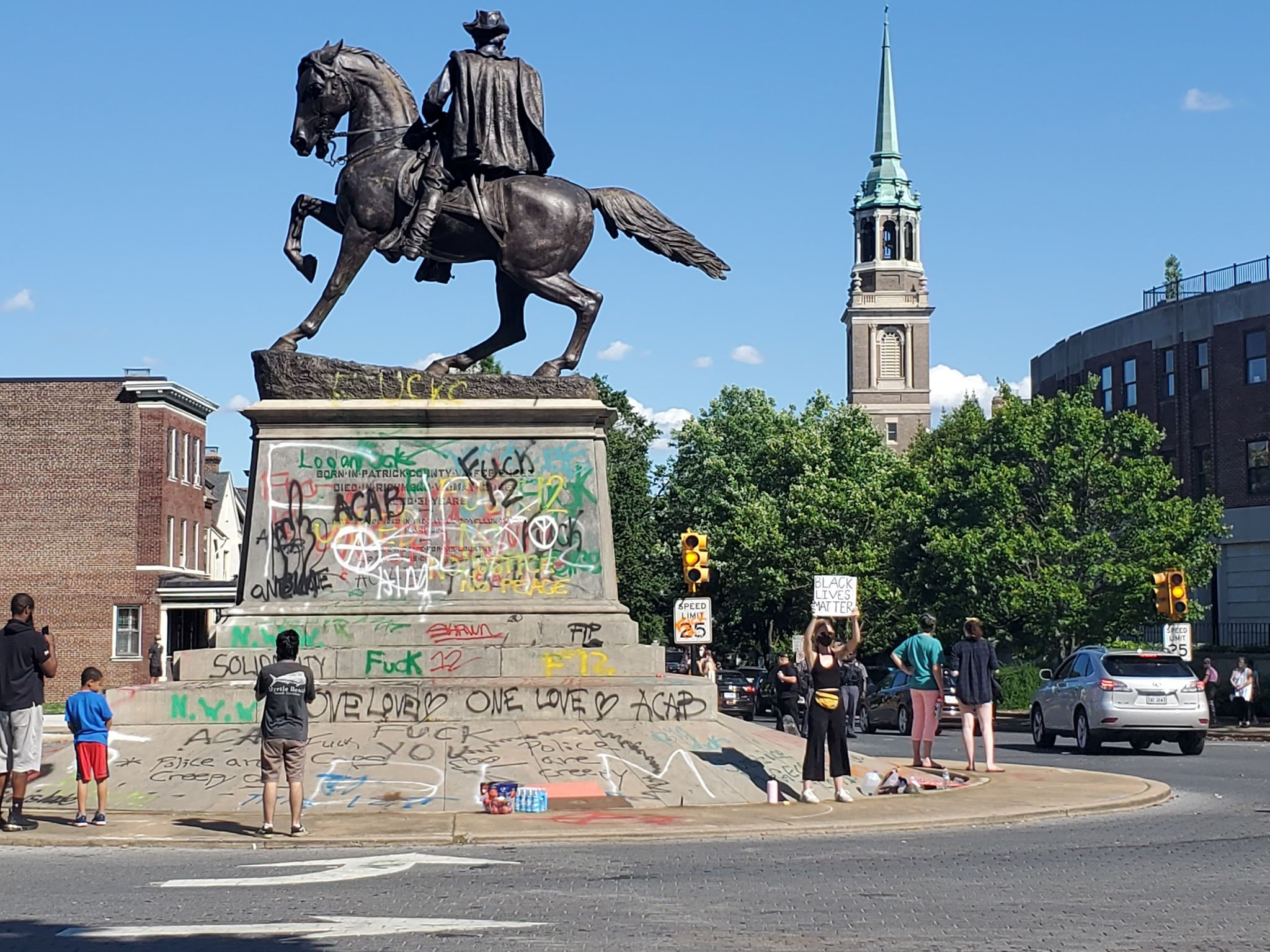
The J. E. B. Stuart Monument, defaced during protests in Richmond, Virginia, was removed on July 7, 2020

The J. E. B. Stuart Monument, a statue of Stuart by sculptor Frederick Moynihan, used to occupy a space on Richmond's Monument Avenue at Stuart Circle. Originally dedicated in 1907, it was removed on July 7, 2020.

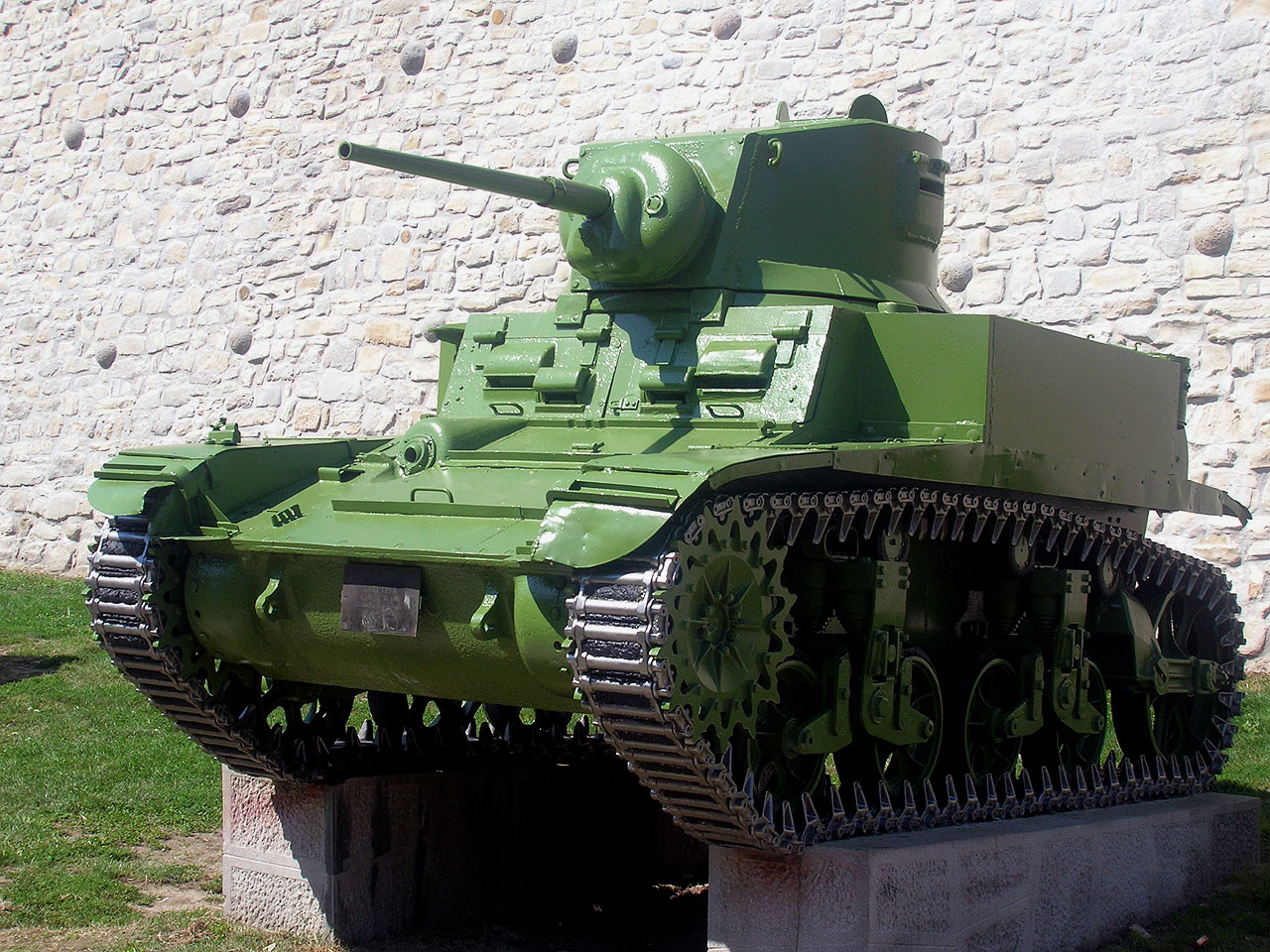
M3A1 Stuart tank

=== Named after Stuart ===
U.S. Route 58, in Virginia, is named the "J.E.B. Stuart Highway". In 1884 the town of Taylorsville, Virginia, was renamed Stuart. The British Army named two models of American-made World War II tanks, the M3 and M5, the Stuart tank in General Stuart's honor.

==== Schools ====
A middle school in Jacksonville, Florida, is named for him. A high school named after him on Munson's Hill in Falls Church, Virginia, opened in 1959. In early 2017, Fairfax County Public Schools established an Ad Hoc Working Committee to assist the Fairfax County School Board in determining whether to rename the Stuart High School in Virginia, in response to suggestions from students and local community members that FCPS should not continue to honor a Confederate general who fought in support of a cause dedicated to maintaining the institution of slavery in Virginia and other states. The creation of the committee followed the circulation of a petition started by actress Julianne Moore and Bruce Cohen in 2016, which garnered over 35,000 signatures in support of changing the school's name to one honoring the late United States Supreme Court Justice Thurgood Marshall.

On July 27, 2017, the Fairfax County School Board approved a measure to change the school name no later than the start of the 2019 school year. The measure asked that "Stuart High School" be considered as a possibility for the new name. On October 27, 2017, the Fairfax County School Board voted to change the name of J.E.B. Stuart High School to "Justice High School." Board member Sandy Evans from the Mason District said that the name will honor Justice Thurgood Marshall, civil rights leader Barbara Rose Johns, U.S. Army officer Louis Gonzaga Mendez Jr., and all those who have fought for justice and equality.

On June 18, 2018, the school board for Richmond Public Schools in Richmond, Virginia, voted 6–1 to rename J. E. B. Stuart Elementary School to Barack Obama Elementary School. On June 12, 2018, students of the school were given the opportunity to narrow down the choices for renaming the school from seven to three. Northside Elementary received 190 votes, Barack Obama Elementary earned 166 votes, and Wishtree Elementary received 127 votes. From there, the administration of Richmond Public Schools recommended to the school board that it rename the school after Barack Obama. Superintendent Jason Kamras said, "It's incredibly powerful that in the capital of the Confederacy, where we had a school named for an individual who fought to maintain slavery, that now we're renaming that school after the first black president. A lot of our kids, and our kids at J. E. B. Stuart, see themselves in Barack Obama." The student population of the newly named Barack Obama Elementary School is made up of more than 90 percent African-American children.

Stuart Hall School is a Staunton, Virginia, co-educational school for students from pre-kindergarten to Grade 12, and it offers a boarding program from Grades 8 to 12. It was renamed in 1907 in honor of its most famous headmistress, Mrs. Flora Cooke Stuart, the widow of Confederate cavalry leader Maj. Gen. J. E. B. Stuart.

=== In popular culture ===
==== Films ====
- Joseph Fuqua played Stuart in the films Gettysburg and Gods and Generals.
- Errol Flynn played Stuart in the movie Santa Fe Trail, depicting his antebellum life, confronting John Brown in Kansas and at Harper's Ferry.

==== Television ====
- A limited television series based on the novel The Good Lord Bird was released, with Wyatt Russell as Stuart.
- In the second season of Twin Peaks, Ben Horne retreats into a fantasy of being Robert E. Lee after a mental breakdown and believes his brother Jerry Horne to be Stuart.

==== Literature ====
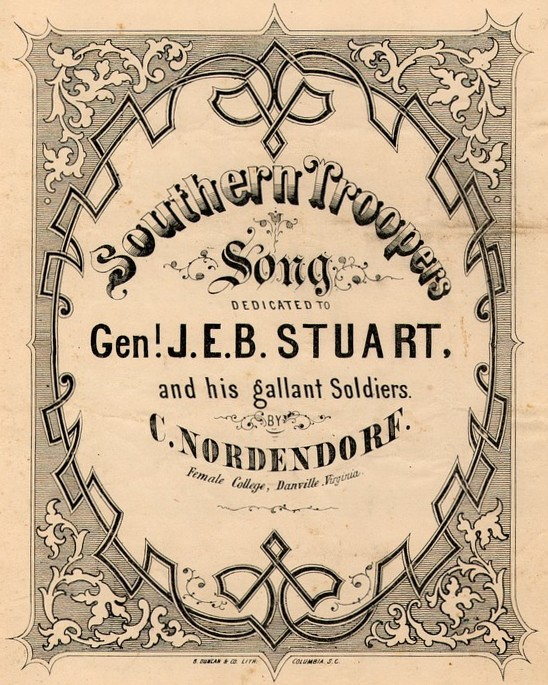
Southern Troopers Song, Dedicated to Gen'l. J. E. B. Stuart and his gallant Soldiers, Sheet music, Danville, Virginia, c. 1864

- Stuart, along with his warhorse, Skylark, is featured prominently in the novel Traveller by Richard Adams.
- In the alternate history novel Gray Victory (1988), author Robert Skimin depicts Stuart surviving his wound from the battle of Yellow Tavern. After the war, in which the Confederacy emerges victorious, he faces a court of inquiry over his actions at the Battle of Gettysburg.
- In Harry Turtledove's 1992 alternate-history novel The Guns of the South, Stuart features as one of Lee's generals as the AWB bring back AK-47 rifles from 2014 to 1864. Men under Stuart's command are the first Confederate troops to use the AK-47 in battle. Stuart is so impressed with the new rifle that he sells his personal LeMat Revolver and replaces it with an AK-47.
- In Harry Turtledove's alternate-history novel How Few Remain, Stuart is the commanding Confederate general in charge of the occupation and defense of the recently purchased Mexican provinces of Sonora and Chihuahua in 1881. This is the first volume of the Southern Victory series, where the US and CSA fight each other repeatedly in the 19th and 20th centuries. Stuart's son and grandson also appear in these novels.
- Several short stories in Barry Hannah's collection Airships feature Stuart as a character.
- Stuart's route to Gettysburg is the impetus for the sci-fi-ish book An End to Bugling by Edmund G. Love.
- Stuart is also a character in L. M. Elliott's Annie, Between the States.
- J. E. B. Stuart is a character in the historical adventure novel Flashman and the Angel of the Lord by George MacDonald Fraser featuring Stuart's early-career role in the US Army at John Brown's raid on Harpers Ferry.
- In the long-running comic book G.I. Combat, featuring "The Haunted Tank", published by DC Comics from the 1960s through the late 1980s, the ghost of General Stuart guided a tank crew (the tank being, at first, a Stuart, later a Sherman) commanded by his namesake, Lt. Jeb Stuart.

==== Music ====
- Southern Troopers Song, Dedicated to Gen'l. J. E. B. Stuart and his gallant Soldiers
- "When I Was on Horseback", a song on the folk group Arborea's album Fortress of the Sun (2013), features lyrics that refer to Stuart's death near Richmond, Virginia.

== See also ==
- List of American Civil War generals (Confederate)

== Books ==
- Bonekemper, Edward H., III. How Robert E. Lee Lost the Civil War. Fredericksburg, VA: Sergeant Kirkland's Press, 1998. ISBN 1-887901-15-9.
- Coddington, Edwin B. The Gettysburg Campaign; a study in command. New York: Scribner's, 1968. ISBN 978-0-684-84569-2.
- Davis, Burke. Jeb Stuart: The Last Cavalier. New York: Random House, 1957. ISBN 0-517-18597-0.
- Eicher, John H., and David J. Eicher. Civil War High Commands. Stanford, CA: Stanford University Press, 2001. ISBN 978-0-8047-3641-1.
- Longacre, Edward G. The Cavalry at Gettysburg: A Tactical Study of Mounted Operations during the Civil War's Pivotal Campaign, June 9–July 14, 1863. Lincoln: University of Nebraska Press, 1986. ISBN 978-0-8032-7941-4.
- Longacre, Edward G. J.E.B Stuart: The Soldier and the Man. El Dorado Hills, CA: Savas Beatie, 2024. ISBN 978-161121-680-6.
- Longacre, Edward G. Lee's Cavalrymen: A History of the Mounted Forces of the Army of Northern Virginia. Mechanicsburg, PA: Stackpole Books, 2002. ISBN 978-0-8117-0898-2.
- Perry, Thomas D. J. E. B. Stuart's Birthplace: The History of the Laurel Hill Farm. Ararat, VA: Laurel Hill Publishing, 2008. ISBN 978-1-4382-3934-7.
- Peterson, Alexander Duncan Campbell. Schools Across Frontiers: The Story of the International Baccalaureate and the United World Colleges. La Salle, IL: Open Court Publishing, 2003. ISBN 0-8126-9505-4.
- Rhea, Gordon C. The Battles for Spotsylvania Court House and the Road to Yellow Tavern, May 7–12, 1864. Baton Rouge: Louisiana State University Press, 1997. ISBN 978-0-8071-2136-8.
- Robertson, James I. Jr. Stonewall Jackson: The Man, The Soldier, The Legend. New York: Simon & Schuster Macmillan, 1997. ISBN 978-0-02-864685-5.
- Salmon, John S. The Official Virginia Civil War Battlefield Guide. Mechanicsburg, PA: Stackpole Books, 2001. ISBN 978-0-8117-2868-3.
- Sears, Stephen W. Chancellorsville. Boston: Houghton Mifflin, 1996. ISBN 0-395-87744-X.
- Sears, Stephen W. Gettysburg. Boston: Houghton Mifflin, 2003. ISBN 0-395-86761-4.
- Sifakis, Stewart. Who Was Who in the Civil War. New York: Facts On File, 1988. ISBN 978-0-8160-1055-4.
- Smith, Derek. The Gallant Dead: Union & Confederate Generals Killed in the Civil War. Mechanicsburg, PA: Stackpole Books, 2005. ISBN 0-8117-0132-8.
- Starr, Steven. The Union Cavalry in the Civil War: The War in the East from Gettysburg to Appomattox, 1863–1865. Volume 2. Baton Rouge: Louisiana State University Press, 2007. Originally published 1981. ISBN 978-0-8071-3292-0.
- Thomas, Emory M. Bold Dragoon: The Life of J.E.B. Stuart. Norman: University of Oklahoma Press, 1986. ISBN 978-0-8061-3193-1.
- Warner, Ezra J. (1959). Generals in Gray: Lives of the Confederate Commanders (1st ed.). Baton Rouge: Louisiana State University Press. OCLC 445052.
- Wert, Jeffry D. Cavalryman of the Lost Cause: A Biography of J.E.B. Stuart. New York: Simon & Schuster, 2008. ISBN 978-0-7432-7819-5.
- Wittenberg, Eric J., and J. David Petruzzi. Plenty of Blame to Go Around: Jeb Stuart's Controversial Ride to Gettysburg. New York: Savas Beatie, 2006. ISBN 978-1-932714-20-3.
