= Saint Paul Catholic Church (Ellicott City, Maryland) =

Coordinates: 39°16′0.3″N 76°47′45.7″W

Saint Paul Catholic Church, Ellicott City
- Saint Paul Catholic Church, Ellicott City
- Location: 3755 St Paul Street Ellicott City, Maryland, 21043
- Country: United States
- Denomination: Catholic Church
- Sui iuris church: Latin Church
- Website: www.stpaulec.org

History
- Status: Parish church
- Dedicated: December 13, 1838

Architecture
- Functional status: Active

Administration
- Archdiocese: Archdiocese of Baltimore

Clergy
- Archbishop: William E. Lori
- Pastor: Msgr. John Dietzenbach

Saint Paul Catholic Church is a Catholic parish in Ellicott City, Maryland, county seat of Howard County. The parish was founded in 1838 and is part of the Archdiocese of Baltimore.

Famous baseball player for the Baltimore Orioles, Boston Red Sox, and New York Yankees who was raised in southwest Baltimore and attended old St. Mary's Industrial School on Wilkens Avenue – George Herman ("Babe Ruth") Ruth (1895–1948) was married here in October 1914 to Miss Margaret Helen Woodford.

It is a two-story ashlar granite church which faces north, three bays wide and four bays deep. Its front facade includes two twin Roman arch windows each topped by a rose window, enclosed within a Roman arch lintel with keystone.

== History ==
Saint Paul Catholic Church was constructed on land in then Ellicott Mills acquired from George Ellicott, an early settler of the Ellicott family in the region along the rushing waters and falls of the upper Patapsco River.

The first priest and pastor of the church was the Rev. Henry B. Coskery, who served briefly for two years in 1838 to 1839. Prior to the establishment of the parish, he celebrated Mass at the nearby Castle Angelo. The church was dedicated on December 13, 1838, as the only Roman Catholic parish between Baltimore and Frederick, Maryland, 30 miles to the west. It is now the oldest active Catholic parish between Baltimore and Pittsburgh.

1838, is also the year that the Howard or Western District was set up from adjacent Anne Arundel County, because of the distance to the county seat and state capital of Annapolis on the shores of the Chesapeake Bay to the southeast. By 1851, the District was officially separated from Anne Arundel and erected into the 22nd jurisdiction of the state of Maryland as the newly named Howard County with its seat of government and courthouse set up in newly renamed Ellicott City., on the banks of the Patapsco on the eastern border of the new county adjacent to older Baltimore County, It was named after Colonel John Eager Howard (1752–1827), a Baltimorean and Marylander militia officer in the Continental Army in the American Revolutionary War,

Father Coskery also established the ministry of the Christian Brothers' religious order to come and staff and support the nearby Rock Hill College (a boys boarding school / secondary school) in 1857, which had been founded three decades earlier in 1824. The stone structures of its buildings were erected outside Ellicott City following the American Civil War (1861–1865) with the guidance and help of Baltimore City's municipal architect George A. Frederick (1842–1924). He also designed the historic monumental Baltimore City Hall (under construction 1867–1875, renovated 1974–1975), plus numerous other City buildings, such as the old Baltimore City College's first structure in 1874–1875 at North Howard and West Centre Streets (replacement second building built in 1892–1899 and still standing). Some of the other designed municipal facilities and pavilions were especially notable in the several large parks such as Druid Hill and Patterson. But a half-century later the stone edifice of Rock Hill was tragically damaged in an accidental fire starting in a chimney in November 1923, when the school / college was 99 years old, leaving only gutted ruins and the stone facade walls.

The Rev. Augustin Verot (1804-1876), originally from France in 1830, after serving 23 years on the faculty of St. Mary's College and theological seminary (founded 1791 in Downtown Baltimore on North Paca Street, He was sent to Ellicott City shortly after the erection of the river town's designation as the county seat of the recently separated Howard County two years earlier in 1851. He served as fourth pastor of the St. Paul's church from 1853 to 1858, and was succeeded immediately by the fifth parish priest of the Rev. John Samuel Foley (1833–1918), who served here for five more years during the beginning of the tragic Civil War until 1863. Both later became ordained to the additional ministry of bishops (Father Verat later as Bishop of Savannah in the Roman Catholic Diocese of Savannah (Savannah, Georgia), and later also as vicar for adjacent Florida, subsequently Bishop of St. Augustine in the Diocese of St. Augustine); and Father Foley subsequently as Archbishop of Detroit in the Roman Catholic Archdiocese of Detroit (Detroit, Michigan).

During the American Civil War (1861–1865), after nearby battles, the basement of the church served as a hospital for both United States Army / Union Army / Federal / Northern / "Yankees" troops and opposing Confederate States Army / Rebels / Southern soldiers and officers.

During the long ninth pastorate of the Rev. Peter Tarro (1883–1907), several structural improvements and additions of liturgical furniture were made to the church building. Three marble altars were added to the church nave / chancel, as were new pews, a confessional, Statues and artwork Stations of the Cross, stained-glass windows, a baptistery, and a prominent spire on the roof to landmark the church.

In the early 1900s, many couples who eloped to become married came to St. Paul's to have their private ceremonies. One of the most famous occurred on October 14, 1914, George Herman ("Babe Ruth") Ruth (1895–1948), and his bride Miss Margaret Helen Woodford were married in St. Paul's by the church's 12th pastor, the Rev. Thomas Dolan. He was 19 at the time and she was 17. He had just finished playing a short 1914 season with his home town team, the Baltimore Orioles (then playing 1903–1953 "in exile" in the International League "Triple AAA" minor league level) after being discovered and signed to a contract by longtime legendary owner / manager Jack Dunn (1872–1928), while he was completing at the St. Mary's Industrial School on Wilkens and Caton Avenues in the southwest City. Ruth had just been dubbed with his soon-to-be-famous nickname as "Dunnie's Babe" and was traded further north (initially as a pitcher) with the Boston Red Sox of the American League. His most famous sports seasons would occur in the subsequent decades with the "Bronx Bombers" of the New York Yankees Ruth, who was known to fabricate certain elements of his personal history, later claimed that he "married [his] first wife in Elkton." (the county seat of Cecil County in the northeast corner of the state, a well-known famed longtime "marriage mill" in those days for those couples coming from East Coast cities, with to a courthouse or churches with little or no waiting period or medical tests required). However, the marriage certificate on file here lists "Ellicott City" as the place of his marriage. For the curious or rabid baseball fans, a copy of the Ruths' 1914 Ellicott City, Howard County marriage certificate is exhibited by St. Paul's in the church narthex.

The St. Paul's Church is included in the territory . jurisdiction of the local designated Ellicott City Historic District. In a 1977 draft text nomination . application documents for the historic Roman Catholic church to be listed on the National Register of Historic Places, maintained by the National Park Service of the United States Department of the Interior, (which appears never to have been officially submitted or acted upon), it was noted in the descriptive details that "In addition to its historical merit it is an outstanding example of American eclectic architecture, blending elements of the Gothic and Romanesque style architecture in its fenestration and entrances with simple granite stone architecture so indigenous to Howard County geology."

St. Paul's Church created a chapel for the young men students of the nearby Rock Hill College also run by the Christian Brothers religious order two years after they arrived in 1859 by parish priest Father Augusta Venot's invitation. The side chapel eventually however later became part of the church nave proper after the school closed in 1924 and was merged with another Roman Catholic high school / secondary school (Calvert Hall College, founded 1845) then in downtown Baltimore, also led and staffed by the Christian Brothers in November 1923 after the devastating accidental fire damaged its 60 years old stone buildings.

In the modern 21st century, St. Paul's served as a refuge for people during the devastating Ellicott City flood on the upper Patapsco River that took place on July 30, 2016. The church's pastor, the Rev. Warren Tanghe, opened one of the church's buildings to people fleeing the floodwaters. Over 50 people stayed in the church. 2 people died in the flood. The parish also hosted later flood recovery activity in 2017 with an assistance program.

== School ==
What is now Resurrection-St. Paul School was founded originally as St. Paul Parish School in 1922 at the direction of the St. Paul's then pastor, the Rev. Michael Ryan. In its early days it was staffed by the religious and educational order of the School Sisters of Notre Dame (S.S.N.D.)s in 1966, due to the growth of the school population and the lack of space on the St. Paul's property, the location was moved to Paulskirk Drive in Ellicott City, and the school was renamed St. Paul the Apostle School. In 1974, the Church of the Resurrection parish was established on the same property as the school, and it was renamed Resurrection School. In January 1990, the name was changed once more to Resurrection-St. Paul School. It is now fully supported by both parishes, and teaches students from Pre-Kindergarten through the 8th grade of Middle school.

In 2016, the school's enrollment was 425 students.

== Pastors ==
The following men served as pastor of St. Paul's:

- 1st – Rev. Henry B. Coskery (1838–1839)
- 2nd – Rev. B.S. Piot, SS. (1840–?)
- 3rd – Rev. B.J. McManus
- 4th – Rev. Augustin Verot (1853–1858)
- 5th – Rev. John Samuel Foley (1858–1863)
- 6th – Rev. T. O'Neill (1864–1870)
- 7th – Rev. William E. Starr (1870–1873)
- 8th – Rev. John J. Dougherty (1873–1883)
- 9th – Rev. Peter Tarro, D.D. (1883–1907)
- 10th – Rev. Michael Ryan (1907–1912)
- 11th – Rev. D.C. Keenan (1912–1914)
- 12th – Rev. Thomas S. Dolan (1914–1920)
- 13th – Rev. Michael Ryan (same as above; 1920–1953)
- 14th – Rev. Nicholas Dohony (1962–1986)
- 15th – Rev. Donald Croghan (1986–1992)
- 16th – Rev. Tom Donaghy (1992–2003)
- 17th – Rev. Michael Jendrek (2003–2008)
- 18th – Rev. Matthew T. Buening (2009–2015)
- 19th – Rev. Samuel Young (2015)
- 20th – Rev. Warren V. Tanghe (2016–2019)
- 21st – Msgr. John Dietzenbach (2020–present)
