= Elkridge Landing =

Historic seaport, now part of Elkridge, MD, US

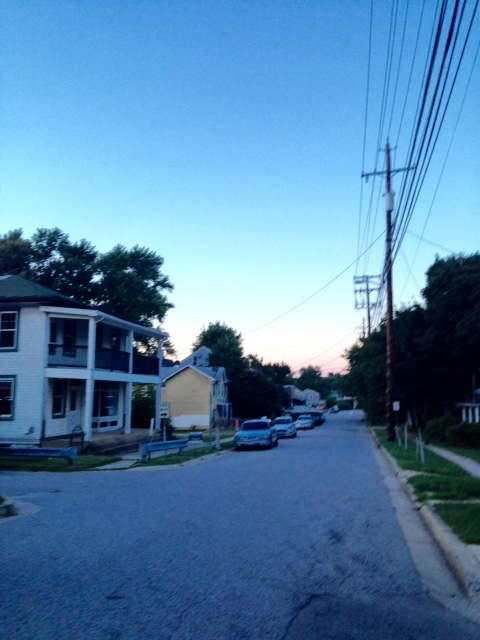
- Elkridge Main Street

- Location within Maryland
- 39°12′58.09″N 76°42′33.22″W
- Location: Elkridge, Maryland

History
- Founded: 1690

Site notes
- Area: 100 acres (40 ha)

U.S. Historic district
- Official name: Elkridge Landing Historic District
- Designated: 2003
- Reference no.: HO-784

Elkridge Landing was a Patapsco River seaport in Maryland, and is now part of Elkridge, Maryland. The historic Elkridge Furnace Inn site is in Patapsco Valley State Park.

== Geography ==
Elkridge is located in present-day Howard County, Maryland, west of the Patapsco River, south of Route 1, and with the Baltimore and Ohio Railroad (B&O) running through the middle of the historic district. The historic roads are the old Washington Turnpike, now Main Street, Railroad Avenue, Paradise Avenue, Elkridge Heights Road and Furnace Avenue.

== History ==
=== The Elkridge site ===
Pottery has been found dating from 1800 B.C.E. and there is evidence of settlement along the Patapsco River until 1500 C.E.

=== Seaport ===
In 1690 the town and seaport of Elkridge Landing was settled in the Patapsco Valley of the Colony of Maryland. (Note: Quakers were living in the Elkridge area about 1670 when they began meeting at the Elkridge Meetinghouse.) It was a deep-water port, with a channel about 10 to 14 feet deep, that brought ships inland from the Chesapeake Bay. Tobacco casks, or hogsheads, were rolled down Rolling Hill to the port by "long strings of slaves" and boarded ships. Manufactured iron was also shipped out of the port.

Native Americans lived north of the Elkridge Landing site in 1692 and rangers were appointed among the settlers to keep watch.

Around 1725, a 28-by-16-foot "Rowling House" with clapboard siding was built on the landing to store tobacco rolled in hogsheads to market. In 1727, the state ended the practice of having ship sailors personally retrieve hogsheads of tobacco. Inland tobacco farms increased productivity by rolling their own hogsheads to ports of Baltimore, Annapolis, and Elkridge.

Six acres around the Rowling house were surveyed by William Cromwell on 7 February 1743. The site was purchased by Caleb and Edward Dorsey and named "Calebs and Edwards Friendship".

Mining for ironstone on the banks of the Patapsco River dumped sand and earth dumped into the river, closing the port of Elkridge Landing after the first half of the 1700s. A 1753 law was enacted to prevent the further filling in of the Patapsco River's shipping channel at Elkridge Landing and up to Baltimore.

In 1763, half of Anne Arundel's tobacco production was processed at the landing: 1,695 hogsheads. Christ Church Guilford taxed the tobacco to pay for the local sheriff and church expenses.

=== Jansen-Town ===
On April 12, 1733, the Maryland General Assembly voted to make Elkridge Landing the town of Jansen-Town in what was then the County of Ann-Arundel. At that time 40 lots were created on 30 acres of land purchased near or on the Patapasco River.

=== Iron manufacturing ===
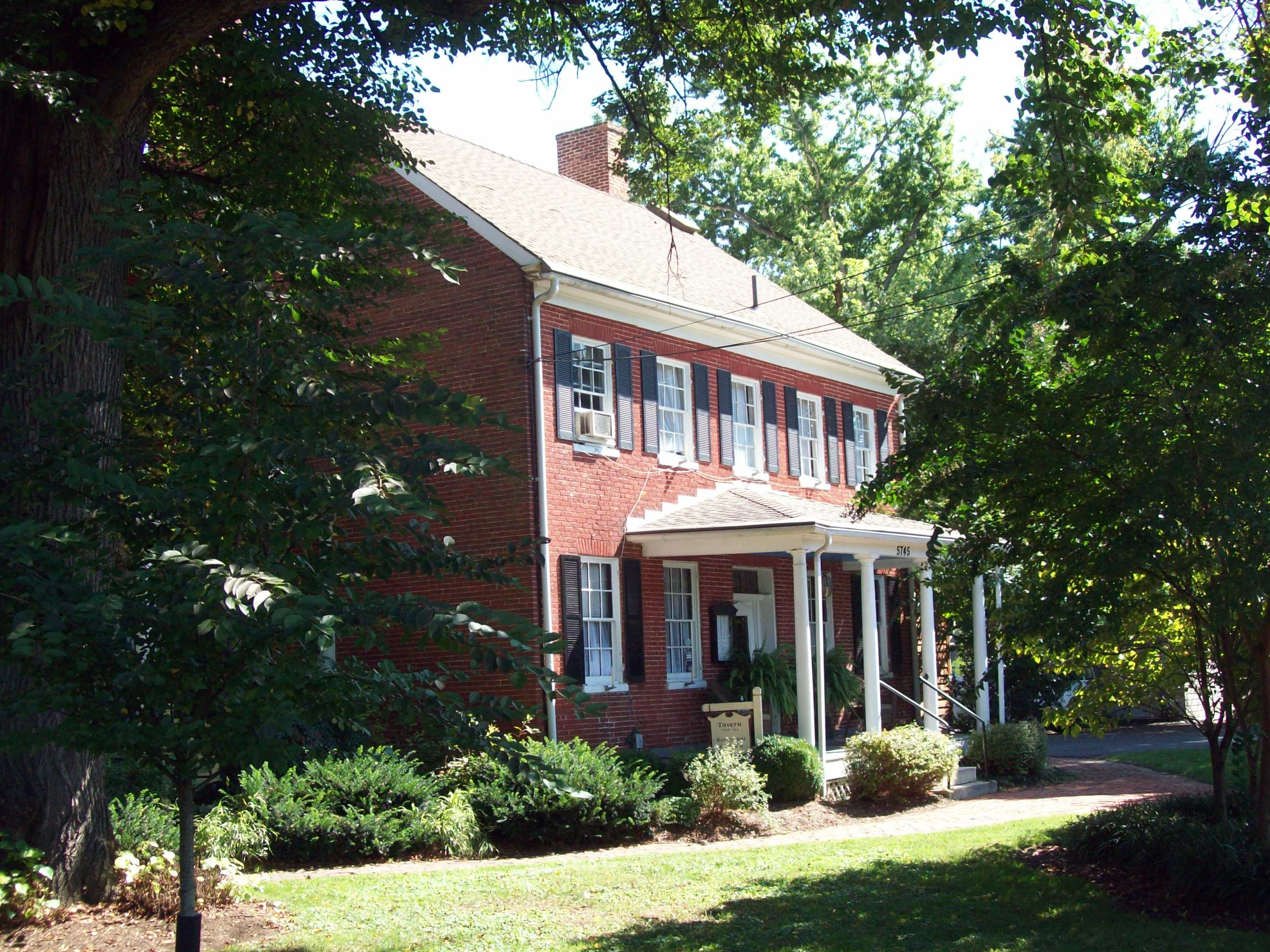
Elkridge Furnace House at the Elkridge Furnace Complex, which first began with Caleb Dorsey's Forge and then the Ellicott brother's Avalon Iron Works.

Caleb Dorsey, an ironmaster aware of iron ore found in the Patapsco River valley, established Dorsey's Forge in 1761. It ran on water power from the river and made nails and horseshoes. During the American Revolutionary War he made cannons and bayonets. As of 1787 there were 9 or more slaves that worked his operation.

In 1822 the business was purchased by Thomas, James and Benjamin Ellicott from Pennsylvania. It was first named Avalon Iron Works, but then became a nail factory and rolling mill. More than 100 people worked at the complex by the 1850s. The forge, factory and mill were destroyed in a flood in 1868. Two structures that remained are in the Patapsco Valley State Park. By 1880, the town was described as "A sorry village on the Patapsco, which once hoped to be the rival of Baltimore."

=== Transportation ===
The town became more prosperous when the Washington Turnpike and the railroad traversed through the town, resulting in new residential and commercial construction. During the American Civil War Union troops were deployed to protect both bridges. In the 1930s when Route 1 skirted the city, many commercial buildings moved alongside the highway.

=== Historic district ===
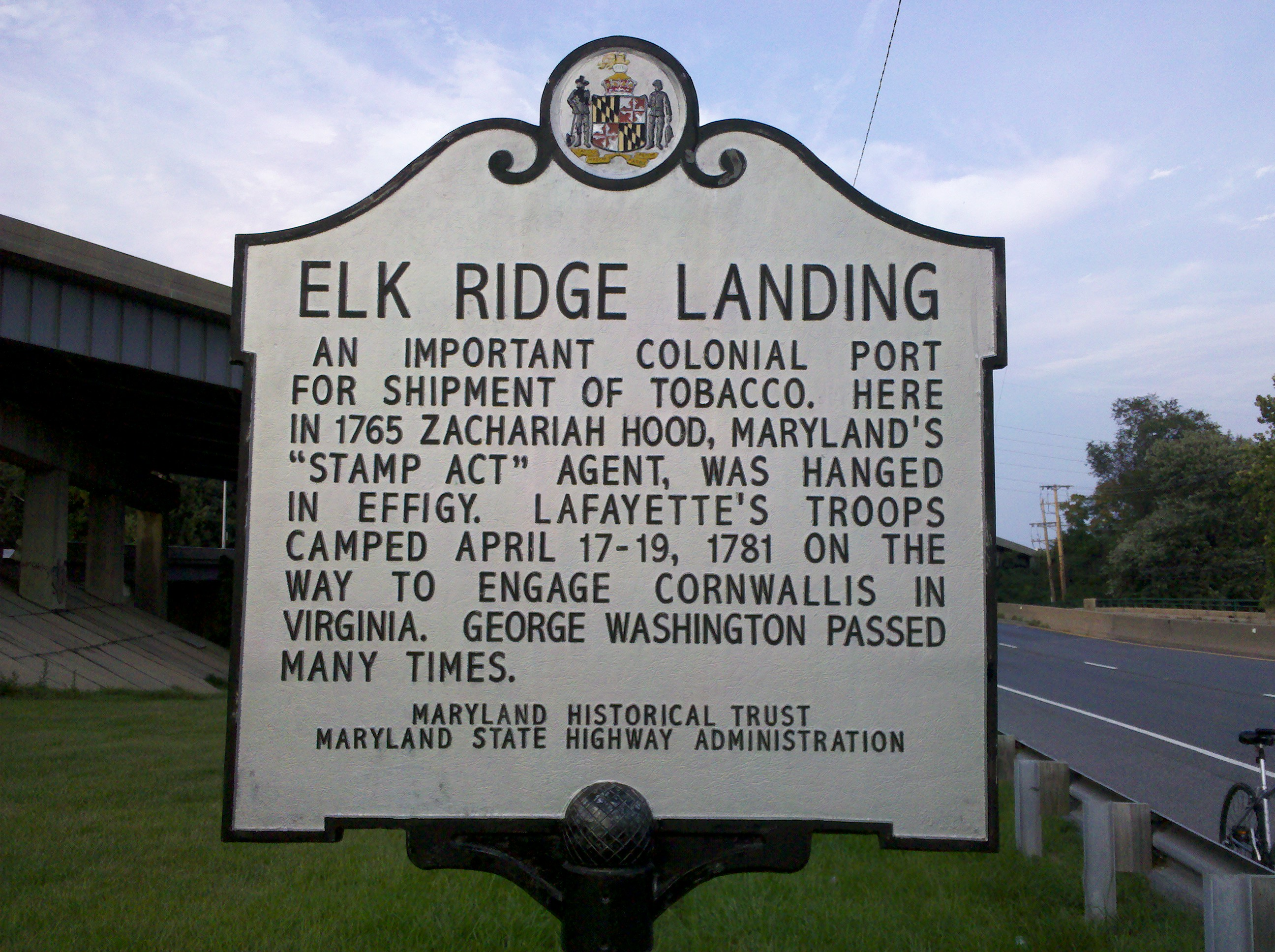
Historic Marker

An application was submitted in 2003 to make it a historic district and is now on the Inventory of Historic Properties with the Maryland Historical Trust. There are business and residential properties built between the 1820s and 1920s within the district. It is one of the oldest settlements in Howard County, Maryland. Elkridge Landing is significant for its historic iron and shipping industries, role in development of the railroads in the 19th century, architecture and its archaeological potential.

=== Present ===
In 2015, the Howard County Council approved a payment in lieu of taxes agreement for Riverwatch, a middle-income townhouse and apartment development built by the KB Companies in coordination with the Howard County Housing and Community Development on Furnace Avenue replacing a series of small historic single family homes in the neighborhood.

== Notable people ==
- Andrew Ellicott
- John Ellicott
- George Poe

== See also ==
- Belmont Estate
- Elkridge Furnace Complex
