= Gordon Ramsay's 24 Hours to Hell and Back =

American cooking television series

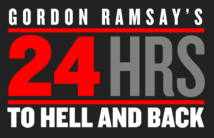
- Genre: Reality television
- Starring: Gordon Ramsay
- Country of origin: United States
- Original language: English
- No. of seasons: 3
- No. of episodes: 28

Production
- Executive producers: Gordon Ramsay; Michael Van Briesen; Chris Brodgen; Layla Smith; Greg Lipstone; Tim Warren
- Production companies: Studio Ramsay; All3Media America

Original release
- Network: Fox
- Release: June 13, 2018 – May 12, 2020

Gordon Ramsay's 24 Hours to Hell and Back is an American reality television series that aired on Fox from June 13, 2018 to May 12, 2020.

Starring chef Gordon Ramsay, the show features his travels across the United States, visiting failing restaurants in his 70-foot-long "Hell On Wheels" semi-truck that unfolds into a high-tech mobile kitchen, where the chefs are retrained. At first, a team is sent in to secretly survey the restaurant, with Ramsay eventually going undercover inside. He then tries to address the issues and revive each restaurant by retraining staff and refreshing the menu, culminating in a relaunch of the restaurant with a grand re-opening to the public after extensive renovations—all in just 24 hours. The format is similar to those of other programs such as Hotel Hell, Kitchen Nightmares, and Restaurant: Impossible.

On June 27, 2018, Fox renewed Gordon Ramsay's 24 Hours to Hell and Back for a second season, which premiered on January 2, 2019. The show was later renewed for a third season on July 26, 2019, which premiered on January 7, 2020.

On March 4, 2020, it was announced that a 2-hour "Save Our Town" special episode would be airing on May 12, in which Ramsay helps three businesses in Ellicott City, Maryland following their 2016 and 2018 floods.

== Episodes ==
=== Series overview ===
Season	Episodes	Originally released	
Season	Episodes	First released	Last released
1	8	June 13, 2018	August 15, 2018
2	10	January 2, 2019	March 6, 2019
3	9	January 7, 2020	February 25, 2020
Special		May 12, 2020	

=== Season 1 (2018) ===
No. overall	No. in season	Title	City	Original release date	Prod. code	U.S. viewers (millions)
1	1	"Bella Gianna's"	Congers, New York	June 13, 2018	HRS–101	3.67
Gordon Ramsay travels to Congers, New York, to attempt to save a family-run Italian bistro. The restaurant is open. Reviews are mostly positive with praise for the low prices, friendly staff and great food. Some customers have complained of shouting in the dining room and the restaurant being empty.
2	2	"The Old Coffeepot Restaurant"	New Orleans, Louisiana	June 20, 2018	HRS–102	3.47
Gordon is in New Orleans, Louisiana, saving The Old Coffee Pot restaurant, a century-old breakfast spot in the heart of the French Quarter. This restaurant closed in February 2019 due to declining business, lack of support for the changes from regulars and local construction, but reopened as Café Beignet at The Old Coffee Pot in August that year.
3	3	"Brownstone Bistro"	Los Angeles, California	June 27, 2018	HRS–103	3.52
Gordon travels to the heart of Los Angeles, California in an attempt to save The Brownstone Bistro, an authentic Caribbean Fusion restaurant. This is the first episode featuring Hell's Kitchen season ten winner Christina Wilson amongst the kitchen staff training crew. This restaurant is open under new ownership. The restaurant closed in October 2018, but reopened in January 2019 with Clive's menu, concept and decor. Reviews are mostly positive, with complaints about unexpected closures of the restaurant.
4	4	"Sherman's Restaurant"	Greenville, Mississippi	July 11, 2018	HRS–104	3.13
Gordon is in Greenville, Mississippi, to save Sherman's, a family-owned fine dining restaurant which has been on the decline ever since inheriting an aging head chef from the previous owner. The restaurant closed in January 2021 after a kitchen fire, but reopened at a new location in August 2021. Reviews are mostly positive, with praise to the food and service, though some diners have complained about wait times. Steve is now working as a butcher and they claim he was never paid $90,000.
5	5	"La Serenata"	Los Angeles, California	July 18, 2018	HRS–105	3.23
Gordon is in Los Angeles, in an attempt to save La Serenata, a family-owned authentic Mexican restaurant in a downward spiral due to a power struggle between mother and son. Three months after the renovation, Marco Sr. reverted to his old menu and habits and drove Johnny away. This restaurant is open. Reviews are mostly positive, with customers loving the salsa and margaritas.
6	6	"Fetch Bistro"	Wichita, Kansas	July 25, 2018	HRS–106	3.17
Gordon travels to Wichita, Kansas in an attempt to save Fetch Bistro, the first dog-friendly restaurant in the state that is a health hazard due to lack of systems and procedures. The restaurant closed on April 28, 2019. The owners blamed the location for the closure, which is a surprise as reviews from locals were mostly very positive. They were hoping to reopen in a new location.
7	7	"Patrick Molloy's"	Hermosa Beach, California	August 8, 2018	HRS–107	3.02
Gordon travels to Hermosa Beach, California, to attempt to save Patrick Molloy's, a family-owned Irish pub where the only thing worse than the food is the owners themselves. This is the first restaurant where the makeover was halted 4:24:35 before relaunch due to the stepfather and son still having trust issues. The episode features food blogger Elie Ayrouth and food journalist Victoire Loup. The restaurant is open, but they had to change the décor, as retrospective planning permission was declined. Reviews are very mixed, but customers praise the happy hour.
8	8	"Sandra Dee's Bar-B-Que & Seafood"	Sacramento, California	August 15, 2018	HRS–108	3.17
Gordon is in Sacramento, California, where he is about to encounter his biggest challenge yet in trying to save Sandra Dee's BBQ and Seafood restaurant and her family. Three months after the renovation, Sandra Dee reverted to the old menu and never contacted Gordon for the update. The restaurant closed in July 2019 so Sandra Dee could focus on the catering side of the business. Reviews were mixed prior to the closure.

=== Season 2 (2019) ===
No. overall	No. in season	Title	City	Original release date	Prod. code	U.S. viewers (millions)
9	1	"The Trolley Stop Café"	New Orleans, Louisiana	January 2, 2019	HRS-201	4.12
Gordon returns to New Orleans, this time saving The Trolley Stop Café (est. 1995), where the business started declining the moment the grandson decided to leave the energy business, and purchased the place from his grandfather, even before this MBA graduate became infamous for his hands-off management style, which leads to staff absenteeism, both in attendance, and attention to detail, yet staff members, even his own brother-in-law, are too afraid to confront him. The restaurant closed in September 2021 due to Hurricane Ida and the COVID-19 pandemic. They re-introduced some old menu items and the poboy was a hit with customers but there are mixed reviews on the grits and hashbrowns. This episode features fellow MasterChef judge Aarón Sanchez as an extra expeditor pre-relaunch, who lives just two blocks away, and former New Orleans Saints cornerback Tracy Porter.
10	2	"Shanty on 19th"	Allentown, Pennsylvania	January 9, 2019	HRS-202	3.47
Gordon travels to the theatre district of Allentown, Pennsylvania to save Shanty on 19th, formerly a fine-dining bar and bistro. However, it has failed when new owner Joe, from a sports bar background, meant their inability to let executive chef to replicate the old menu using low-quality ingredients. It is exacerbated by Joe's father's negative feedbacks, which also drove Joe's marriage and business, as well as everybody's health to the brink. The restaurant is open as diners love the burgers but recent reviews are more negative with the crab being subject of many complaints.
11	3	"Vasi's Restaurant and Bar"	Waterbury, Connecticut	January 16, 2019	HRS-203	3.39
Gordon travels to Waterbury, Connecticut to save Vasi's Restaurant and Bar, an Italian restaurant, where he has to confront Vasi, an owner that sucked his mother's savings, and staffs' patience, especially Val, the head chef, dry. The restaurant closed in January 2020 after Vasi received an offer that later fell through.
12	4	"Catfish Cabin"	Memphis, Tennessee	January 23, 2019	HRS-204	3.58
Gordon travels to Memphis, Tennessee to save Catfish Cabin (est. 1971), a Southern restaurant that, despite its lack of competition, and prime position near the airport, need a major revamp after nearly a decade of neglect and fragmented management, and an owner backing the wrong person to hand over before his pending retirement. This resulted in pest infestation and hazardous food safety violations. The restaurant closed in August 2019 after the lease was taken over and gradually changed over by new ownership before being renamed.
13	5	"Stone's Throw"	Seymour, Connecticut	January 30, 2019	HRS-205	4.19
Gordon travels to Seymour, Connecticut, to save Stone's Throw, whose manager, a survivor of breast and thyroid cancers, is working herself to exhaustion. Her husband owns the restaurant and is the head chef. Despite the owner’s 30 years of culinary experience and a history of thriving, even award-winning, restaurants, Stone’s Throw has struggled. The restaurant closed in January 2020 and was put up for sale for $900,000. Reviews had declined with more complaints prior to closure. Before the episode, three members of Ramsay’s crew suffered food poisoning at the restaurant.
14	6	"Bayou on the Vine"	Kansas City, Missouri	February 6, 2019	HRS-206	3.77
Gordon travels to Kansas City, Missouri to save Bayou on the Vine (est. 2017) and to confront the owner that refuses to fire his three daughters for disrespecting the parents, both as superiors and parents, and nobody having restaurant experience, except for the youngest daughter - executive chef, Sharekka, who graduated from culinary school. She also has the most combative demeanor. The restaurant closed in June 2020. Customers praised the food and the happy hour drinks and live bands were a big hit prior to closure. This restaurant is the first ever to be renamed due to its location near the American Jazz Museum and the Negro Leagues Baseball Museum. It was renamed Gadson's, in honor of respected musician James Gadson, who is the paternal uncle of the owner, and was featured at the relaunch. However, the restaurant reverted to Bayou on the Vine immediately after filming.
15	7	"Boardwalk 11"	Los Angeles, California	February 13, 2019	HRS-207	3.31
Gordon Ramsay returns to Los Angeles to rescue Boardwalk 11, a karaoke bar, where he confronts and owner with "30 years of inexperience", and features his first ever hostile takeover, and forced the owner out of the store, and ceding operative control to the two Kat's, the head chef and bar manager, while the bar is transformed into a gastropub and disco lounge. The restaurant is open as reviews are mixed and have declined since 2020. This was the third restaurant in the show to undo the changes made by Gordon Ramsay.
16	8	"Los Toros Mexican Restaurant"	Chatsworth, Los Angeles, California	February 20, 2019	HRS-208	3.53
Gordon Ramsay travels to Chatsworth, a township inside San Fernando Valley, Los Angeles, to rescue Los Toros, a family-owned Mexican restaurant (est. 1967), where the second-generation chef and owner is seriously in debt ($450,000) after his father died, and having to take honorable leave of absence from serving the US Army, and is now suffering from hypertension and myopia from pre-diabetes due to overworking, and his daughter and son not being mentally ready or have enough culinary knowledge to step up and take over. Yet, upon further interviews, Nick Sr. left for military to remove himself from the business, the same way that his children are trying to do to him. It was also discovered that line cooks have no basic knife skills due to them relying heavily on box cutters. The restaurant is open as reviews are mostly positive with high praise for their margaritas and bean dip. They have had no food poisoning incidents but some customers have complained that they reverted to their old menu. This is the first time that a member of staff blew Ramsay's cover before the food was delivered, hence the father stopped service while overhearing Ramsay and friends' comments.
17	9	"Social"	Costa Mesa, California	March 6, 2019	HRS-210	2.66
Gordon Ramsay travels to Costa Mesa, an affluent region in Orange County to rescue Social, a modern bar and bistro that despite its tidy decor (est. 2015), has a very dysfunctional group of staff after a highly successful first year, partly due to new competition nearby. From a power struggle of two executive chefs, one of which is returning on his second stint after taking personal leave, citing burnout, while other cooks not following the current, overbearing executive chef's directions. The restaurant is open and reviews are mostly positive. Customers especially love the Brussels sprouts and chicken and waffles. This episode features a Gordon Ramsay impersonator (Martin Jordan) as a decoy, while the real Gordon Ramsay is in disguise, exposing serious preferential treatment. This episode features Pamela Waitt, President of the OC Restaurant Association as an expert food critic. This episode serves as the final episode in overseas broadcasts.
18	10	"M'Dears Bakery & Bistro"	Los Angeles, California	March 6, 2019	HRS-209	2.66
Gordon Ramsay returns to Los Angeles, this time passing through Los Angeles Stadium at Hollywood Park, and rescuing M'Dears Bakery and Bistro, a Californian twist of Southern-style cuisine (est. 2002), and one of the most complicated and fragmented family he has ever seen. Despite giving the daughters their first jobs, the stress of the business has fractured the relationship between the Armenian owner and her two African-American daughters, with the owner not being able to retire due to her being disowned by her parents and sisters as she married outside of her race and nationality, leaving her ineligible for any inheritance. However, Carrie, the owner, also had a very elitist attitude and is resistant to change, though her concerns are somewhat warranted due to practicality issues because of her short stature. Her relationship with her eldest daughter, Tiffany, is also the most broken and fractured. The restaurant is open as they are popular for breakfast and the chicken and waffles and grits have rave reviews but the mac and cheese are hit and miss with diners. This is the first time where, due to the small dining area, Ramsay, disguised as a cameraman, has taken food outside to eat with the show's cameraman. It is also revealed that Mary, who is the head of the culinary operations, is also Armenian. This episode features celebrity chef Jet Tila and his wife, Ali.

=== Season 3 (2020) ===
No. overall	No. in season	Title	City	Original release date	Prod. code	U.S. viewers (millions)
19	1	"Lowery's Seafood Restaurant"	Tappahannock, Virginia	January 7, 2020	HRS-301	2.54
Gordon Ramsay travels to Tappahannock, Virginia, to help save Lowery's Seafood Restaurant. The business was originally opened over 80 years ago but was handed down to grandson & owner Duby Lowery and his brother David Lowery who is manager, but inconsistent management and sibling infightings also caused tension amongst the staff. Chef Ramsay devises a tasty new menu for the restaurant and the dining area is given a much needed renovation. The restaurant closed in August 2020 after declaring bankruptcy. The buffet and crab cakes received rave reviews prior to closure. Due to the high number of senior citizens, the showing for evidence of malpractices are viewed inside the restaurants. This is also the first time where a staff member quit the job at relaunch.
20	2	"Blend on Main"	Manasquan, New Jersey	January 14, 2020	HRS-302	2.12
Gordon Ramsay travels to the seaside community of Manasquan, New Jersey, to help owner Chef Lou Smith's American bistro Blend on Main. The once thriving business is only busy for two months of the year during the busy summer period and is now close to going out of business. Ramsay must change the owner's attitude towards his staff, who have lost all respect for him. Chef Ramsay creates a new and improved menu for the kitchen staff and the interior is given a modern, yet cosy makeover. The restaurant is open as the fish dishes are hits with customers. Due to Gordon's cover already blown before reconnaissance, fellow chef, James Avery, would disguise as Gordon, while the real Gordon is disguised as a cameraman. James also returned before relaunch to judge a halibut dish cook-off between Lou and Lisa (disguised as Gordon's work), and for the relaunch with his wife. The showing for evidence of malpractices are viewed inside the restaurants.
21	3	"Caneda's White Rooster"	Toms River, New Jersey	January 21, 2020	HRS-303	2.11
Gordon travels to Toms River, New Jersey to help Caneda's White Rooster, a struggling Cuban restaurant that has been open less than a year. Patty Caneda opened the restaurant with the help of investor & business partner Jeremy Grunin who has put $2 million into the business. Gordon is shocked by the terrible food being cooked by the young and inexperienced cooks. The menu is given a revamp and the restaurant dining area is transformed with a new bar and warming colours. The restaurant closed on March 16, 2020, five months after the episode was filmed. Jeremy also joined Gordon in reconnaissance, and also joined by Joseph Gannascoli and Vincent Pastore from The Sopranos. Jeremy Grunin returned at relaunch with a second disguise. Lisa, the new head chef from Blend on Main in the second episode, replaced the inexperienced Phil as Executive Chef of Caneda's White Rooster within 3 months of this makeover.
22	4	"Botto's Italian Line Restaurant"	Swedesboro, New Jersey	January 28, 2020	HRS-304	2.17
Gordon Ramsay travels to Swedesboro, New Jersey, to rescue Botto's Italian Restaurant. The once-thriving family-run business is now $850,000 in debt. Chef Ramsay see for himself how bad the food is when he goes undercover and is served spoiled oysters and disgusting veal. Ramsay must instill some passion back into the cooking and create a much smaller and more manageable menu. Meanwhile, the restaurant's interior is given a much needed makeover. The restaurant is open as customers love the renovated dining room and the Sausage Alla Botto is popular. Mary, Head of Culinary in the food truck, is also in the crowd as a decoy.
23	5	"Seafarer's Family Restaurant"	Manquin, Virginia	February 4, 2020	HRS-305	3.06
Gordon is in Manquin, Virginia, to save Seafarer's Restaurant, run by the Halterman family, Amber, Autumn and their parents. Gordon has his work cut out to fix the warring sisters and the restaurant's substandard food. Ramsay asks Hell's Kitchen season three winner Rock Harper to mentor the staff, especially Logan, the young head chef at Halterman's kitchen. The restaurant is open with customers loving the food with some complaints that they are offering less seafood. The restaurant was renamed Halterman's Eatery upon relaunch.
24	6	"Southern Kitchen"	Richmond, Virginia	February 11, 2020	HRS-306	2.02
Gordon travels to Richmond, Virginia to help the owners of Southern Kitchen, a traditional southern restaurant which is struggling despite being in a busy part of the city. Owner Shane and her daughters Chelsea and Kelyn have invested all of their money and now have a mountain of debt, and all came from completely different careers into hospitality, especially with Chelsea and Kelyn being disillusioned by their mother's dream, yet they have no intention to stay in the industry. Ramsay and his team fix the restaurant's lacklustre food and long wait-time with a new, improved menu and forces the family to make some big changes for the future of the restaurant. The restaurant is open as customers love the soul food with cornbread, cabbage and collards receiving high praise. This is the first time that Gordon meets one of the family members before going undercover: Shane's mother, Linda. At the 3-month follow-up, Shane successfully reduced the hours for Chelsea and Kelyn, making them part-time servers.
25	7	"The Park Restaurant & Bar"	Oak Park, California	February 18, 2020	HRS-307	2.19
Gordon Ramsay travels to Oak Park, California, to help Kirin and Angelika Stone, owners of gastropub The Park Restaurant & Bar. With no Head Chef or manager, the eatery is just weeks away from going out of business. Gordon discovers that the couple have recently lost their home in the Woolsey Fire and that their marriage is almost at a breaking point. With no one in charge of the kitchen, Gordon gets NFL player Rob Gronkowski to help him choose a new Head Chef. Mark, the senior line cook, fell ill with at relaunch, and Kirin is not fit to be a kitchen expeditor. The restaurant closed in December 2020. Reviews were hit and miss prior to closure but customers loved the burgers. Three months after the renovation, it is revealed that Kirin and Angelika have separated; Kevin, the young line cook, left shortly after the relaunch because he was mad at the fact that Kirin had thrown away most of the food that Gordon had prepared, and that Ozzy hadn't been hired and was fired for being consistently absent, which Ozzy claimed was because Kirin never returned his calls; and that Kirin was still struggling to keep the restaurant open.
26	8	"Bear's Den Pizza"	Conway, Arkansas	February 25, 2020	HRS-308	2.12
Gordon Ramsay travels to Bear's Den Pizza, a pizza restaurant and college bar located in Conway, Arkansas. Chef Ramsay finds a restaurant in disarray due to one owner's drinking and violent outbursts, and the other owner who is too busy running their other business. Bear's Den was once popular with the nearby college students and locals, but if the restaurant and its terrible food don't improve soon it will go out of business. The restaurant is open as they are bringing in college crowds with food & drink specials and karaoke. Three months since the relaunch, the business successfully made a minor expansion, while Steve became a support worker in the building industry.
27	9	"South Boulevard"	Little Rock, Arkansas	February 25, 2020	HRS-309	2.03
Chef Ramsay travels to Little Rock, Arkansas to help save South Boulevard, a Korean-inspired restaurant. Its owner claims to lack experience and confidence in running a restaurant and his cook has no real knowledge of Korean food. With the restaurant heavily in debt, Ramsay needs all his expertise to turn the struggling business around. He goes undercover as member of the production crew to observe how the kitchen functions. The restaurant closed in February 2020, the weekend before the episode aired, due to unpaid rent and the loss of their liquor license due to unpaid taxes. Reviews were mostly positive prior to closure. For the first time in the series, he is not shown sampling the food. The showing for evidence of malpractices are viewed inside the restaurants. It also featured Alex Hall, a member of "Hell On Wheels" trainers posing as a temporary local line cook during undercover. It featured a head chef cookoff since Tasha was neither qualified nor experienced to be more than a line cook, and needs help in a solo kitchen.

=== Special (2020) ===
Title	Original release date	Prod. code	U.S. viewers (millions)
"Save Our Town"	May 12, 2020	HRS-310/311	2.36
In the only untimed series of rescue jobs, Gordon travels to the river valley town of Ellicott City, Maryland, having to save an entire town after two major floods in 2016 and 2018 decimated the Main Street. Gordon is also tasked with helping save three restaurants in this town: Phoenix Emporium, Little Market Cafe, and Jaxon Edwin. This mass rescue features Cal Ripken Jr., the Baltimore Ravens, Maryland governor Larry Hogan, the Maryland National Guard, and interior designer Nate Berkus. A follow-up could not be completed before the COVID-19 pandemic hit the United States and closed many businesses in America. As of April 2024, Little Market Cafe and Phoenix Emporium (now called Phoenix Upper Main) are doing well while Jaxon Edwin has since closed.

== Ratings ==
Viewership and ratings per season of Gordon Ramsay's 24 Hours to Hell and Back
Season	Timeslot (ET)	Episodes	First aired		Last aired		TV season	Avg. viewers (millions)	Avg. 18–49 rating
Season	Timeslot (ET)	Episodes	Date	Viewers (millions)	Date	Viewers (millions)	TV season	Avg. viewers (millions)	Avg. 18–49 rating
1	Wednesday 9:00 p.m.	8	June 13, 2018	3.67	August 15, 2018	3.17	2017–18	3.30	0.99
2	Wednesday 8:00 p.m.	10	January 2, 2019	4.12	March 6, 2019	2.66	2018–19	3.47	1.04
3	Tuesday 9:00 p.m.	11	January 7, 2020	2.54	May 12, 2020	2.36	2019–20	2.27	0.60

=== Season 1 ===
Viewership and ratings per episode of Gordon Ramsay's 24 Hours to Hell and Back
No.	Title	Air date	Rating/share (18–49)	Viewers (millions)
1	"Bella Gianna's"	June 13, 2018	1.1/5	3.67
2	"The Old Coffeepot Restaurant"	June 20, 2018	1.0/4	3.47
3	"Brownstone Bistro"	June 27, 2018	1.1/5	3.52
4	"Sherman's Restaurant"	July 11, 2018	0.9/5	3.13
5	"La Serenata"	July 18, 2018	1.0/5	3.23
6	"Fetch Bistro"	July 25, 2018	0.9/5	3.17
7	"Patrick Molloy's"	August 8, 2018	0.9/5	3.02
8	"Sandra Dee's Bar-B-Que & Seafood"	August 15, 2018	1.0/4	3.17

=== Season 2 ===
Viewership and ratings per episode of Gordon Ramsay's 24 Hours to Hell and Back
No.	Title	Air date	Rating/share (18–49)	Viewers (millions)
1	"The Trolley Shop Café"	January 2, 2019	1.2/5	4.12
2	"Shanty on 19th"	January 9, 2019	1.1/5	3.47
3	"Vasi's Restaurant and Bar"	January 16, 2019	1.0/5	3.39
4	"Catfish Cabin"	January 23, 2019	1.1/5	3.58
5	"Stone’s Throw"	January 30, 2019	1.2/5	4.19
6	"Bayou on the Vine"	February 6, 2019	1.1/5	3.77
7	"Boardwalk 11"	February 13, 2019	1.0/5	3.31
8	"Los Toros Mexican Restaurant"	February 20, 2019	1.1/5	3.53
9	"Social"	March 6, 2019	0.8/4	2.66
10	"M'Dears Bakery & Bistro"	March 6, 2019	0.8/4	2.66

=== Season 3 ===
Viewership and ratings per episode of Gordon Ramsay's 24 Hours to Hell and Back
No.	Title	Air date	Rating/share (18–49)	Viewers (millions)
1	"Lowery's Seafood Restaurant"	January 7, 2020	0.7/3	2.54
2	"Blend on Main"	January 14, 2020	0.6/3	2.12
3	"Caneda’s White Rooster"	January 21, 2020	0.6/3	2.11
4	"Botto's Italian Line Restaurant"	January 28, 2020	0.6/3	2.17
5	"Seafarer's Family Restaurant"	February 4, 2020	0.8/3	3.06
6	"Southern Kitchen"	February 11, 2020	0.6	2.02
7	"The Park Restaurant and Bar"	February 18, 2020	0.6	2.19
8	"Bear’s Den Pizza"	February 25, 2020	0.6	2.12
9	"South Boulevard"	February 25, 2020	0.6	2.03
