= Cranston–Gonzalez National Affordable Housing Act =

1990 American federal housing law

- Long title: An Act to expand the supply of affordable housing, strengthen Federal, State, and local housing partnerships, and for other purposes.
- Acronyms (colloquial): NAHA
- Enacted by: the 101st United States Congress
- Effective: November 28, 1990

Citations
- Public law: 101-625
- Statutes at Large: 104 Stat. 4079

Codification
- Acts amended: United States Housing Act of 1937; National Housing Act; related housing statutes

Legislative history
- Introduced in the Senate as S. 566 by Alan Cranston (D‑CA) on March 15, 1989; Committee consideration by Senate Banking, Housing, and Urban Affairs; House Banking, Finance, and Urban Affairs; Signed into law by President George H. W. Bush on November 28, 1990

The Cranston–Gonzalez National Affordable Housing Act (NAHA) is a United States federal law (Pub. L. 101–625) enacted on November 28, 1990, which established the HOME Investment Partnerships Program and authorized the Homeownership and Opportunity for People Everywhere (HOPE) programs, among other major reforms to federal housing policy. Signed by President George H. W. Bush, the Act affirmed a national objective that every American family should be able to afford a decent home and strengthened a nationwide partnership among public and private institutions to carry out housing policy.

== History ==
S. 566 was introduced by Senator Alan Cranston on March 15, 1989, and referred to the Senate Committee on Banking, Housing, and Urban Affairs. After conference, it passed both chambers and was signed into law as Pub. L. 101–625 on November 28, 1990. President Bush’s signing statement highlighted the Act’s HOPE initiatives as a “dramatic and fundamental restructuring of housing policy.”

== Structure and major provisions ==
The Act is organized into ten titles. Key provisions include:

Title I — General provisions and policy

- Affirms the national housing goal and sets the objective of national housing policy; requires State and local governments seeking HUD assistance to prepare comprehensive housing affordability strategies (CHAS) with citizen participation and Federal coordination.

Title II — Investment in Affordable Housing (HOME)

- Enacts the HOME Investment Partnerships Program (short title: HOME Investment Partnerships Act) to provide formula grants to participating jurisdictions for acquisition, rehabilitation, new construction, tenant-based assistance, and related activities; establishes income targeting, matching, CHDO set-asides, affordability standards, and audit/accountability requirements.

Title III — Homeownership

- Creates/expands homeownership initiatives including the National Homeownership Trust, and amends various FHA provisions (e.g., mortgage insurance premiums, actuarial soundness of the Mutual Mortgage Insurance Fund) to bolster program stability and access for first-time buyers.

Title IV — Homeownership and Opportunity for People Everywhere (HOPE)

- Establishes the HOPE programs to promote homeownership and resident control in public and assisted housing, including HOPE for Public and Indian Housing (Secs. 411–431) and HOPE for multifamily units (Secs. 441–448). The statute provides for planning and implementation grants and related Section 8 and FHA amendments. (Related initiatives for elderly independence and later HOPE programs were developed under subsequent authority.)

Title V — Housing assistance; Section 8 and public housing reforms

- Revises tenant preference rules, public housing management, eviction/lease provisions, operating subsidies, modernization funding, portability of certificates/vouchers, family self‑sufficiency, and related Section 8 matters, including Family Unification assistance.

Title VI — Preservation of Affordable Rental Housing (LIHPRHA)

- Enacts the Low‑Income Housing Preservation and Resident Homeownership Act of 1990 (LIHPRHA) to replace the temporary ELIHPA regime, limiting prepayments that would otherwise terminate affordability restrictions and establishing preservation/resident homeownership mechanisms for HUD‑assisted stock.

Title VII — Rural housing

- Authorizes rural housing programs and demonstrations (e.g., deferred mortgage demonstrations, guarantees, remote rural area provisions).

Title VIII — Housing for persons with special needs

- Establishes and revises supportive housing authorities, including Section 811 supportive housing for persons with disabilities, enabling independent living through design and services; includes related elderly/special‑needs program provisions.

Titles IX–X — Miscellaneous and expedited funds availability

- Contains technical, conforming, and expedited funding provisions (including energy efficiency, environmental review, reporting, audits/accountability, and program authorizations).

== Implementation and impact ==
The HOME program (Title II) became a core HUD formula grant supporting locally designed affordable housing strategies by States and localities, with CHDO set‑asides and affordability standards codified in statute and HUD regulation. The HOPE initiatives (Title IV) advanced homeownership and resident participation in public/assisted housing, complementing later programs bearing the HOPE name (e.g., HOPE VI, authorized subsequently and administered by HUD to address severely distressed public housing). LIHPRHA (Title VI) established the principal preservation framework for at‑risk HUD‑assisted multifamily properties in the 1990s.

== Legislative history ==
- Introduced: March 15, 1989 (S. 566), by Sen. Alan Cranston (D–CA).
- Committee reports: S. Rept. 101‑316; H. Rept. 101‑922; H. Rept. 101‑943 (conference).
- Signed into law: November 28, 1990; assigned 101-625

== See also ==
- HOME Investment Partnerships Program
- Section 8 (housing)
- United States Department of Housing and Urban Development
