= Elkridge Furnace Complex =

- U.S. National Register of Historic Places
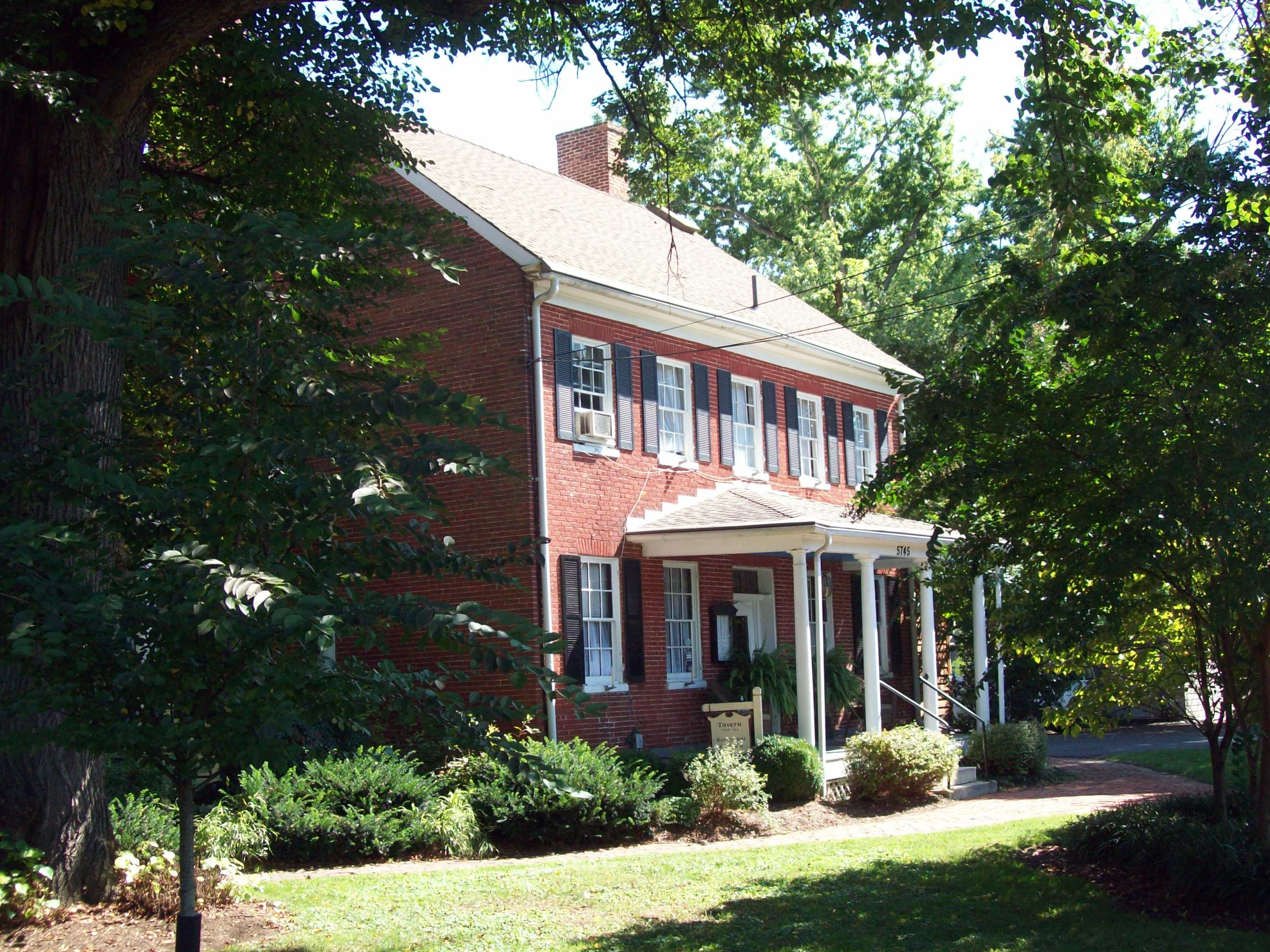
- Elkridge Furnace House, September 2009

- Location within Maryland Location within the United States
- Location: 5730 and 5741-5745 Furnace Ave., 5735 Race Rd., Elkridge, Maryland
- Coordinates: 39°12′47″N 76°42′12″W
- Area: 6 acres (2.4 ha)
- Architectural style: Greek Revival, Federal
- NRHP reference No.: 90000635
- Added to NRHP: June 28, 1990

The Elkridge Furnace Complex is a historic iron works located on about 16 acres (6.5 ha) at Elkridge, Howard County, Maryland.

== Overview ==
It comprises the six remaining buildings of an iron furnace that operated from the 18th century into the 1860s. Included are a large 2 1/2-story Federal/Greek Revival house constructed about 1835 as the residence of the furnace owner; a frame dwelling of about the same date which probably accommodated a manager or clerk; a 2 1/2-story company store and hotel or dormitory for furnace workers; two 19th-century outbuildings, possibly slave quarters; and a mid-19th-century brick duplex worker's dwelling. The 1835 Elkridge Furnace Inn is now operated as a restaurant and banquet facility.

It was listed on the National Register of Historic Places in 1990.

== History ==
The banks of the Patapsco River were mined for ironstone, with the displaced sand and earth dumped into the river, affecting its navigability. In 1753 a law was enacted to prevent the further filling in of the Patapsco River's shipping channel at Elkridge Landing and up to Baltimore.

Caleb Dorsey, an ironmaster aware of iron ore found in the Patapsco River valley, established Elkridge Furnace in 1751 and Dorsey's Forge upriver after 1761. Both projects took advantage of England's need for iron from the colonies which resulted in repealing all taxes on iron pigs in 1750 and iron bar in 1757 respectively. The Furnace bellows ran on water power; Water was diverted to a water wheel through a water race. The turning waterwheel drove a gear shift that powered the bellows which fanned the forge's charcoal fire. Dorsey's Forge made nails and horseshoes against English law forbidding finished production in the Colonies. During the American Revolutionary War he made cannons and bayonets. In 1772, Samuel and Edward Dorsey inherited their father Caleb's estate. In 1787 Samuel died, there were 9 or more slaves that worked his operation at the time.

Benjamin, Jonathan, Elias, George, Charles, and Thomas Ellicott from Pennsylvania created the Avalon Iron Works in 1822, purchasing Dorsey's Forge and the Elkridge Furnace land. Andrew Ellicott built new furnace in 1826 manufacturing nails and rolled and split iron. Pig iron was used to create nails using waterpower at the forge in the 1800s. More than 100 people worked at the complex by the 1850s. The same year the Ellicott's furnace operations were foreclosed on by the Maryland Bank after iron prices dropped drastically. The Union Bank of Maryland purchased 700 acres including the forge for $25,000 in April 1850.

The Furnace was acquired by the Great Falls Iron Company in 1854. The forge, factory, mill and deep water channels were destroyed in a flood in 1868. Enough was rebuilt to maintain production until 1873 when floodwaters mixed with molten iron, exploding the facility. Two structures that remained including the Furnace Inn are in a small extension of the Patapsco Valley State Park.

In 2013, the Howard County Housing and Community Development and Ingerman Group attempted to place low income housing apartments next to the historic setting on the riverbanks adjacent to the site.

In 2022, the Maryland Department of Transportation and Department of Natural Resources funded $50,000 for archaeological work at the property, beginning in July.

== Gallery ==
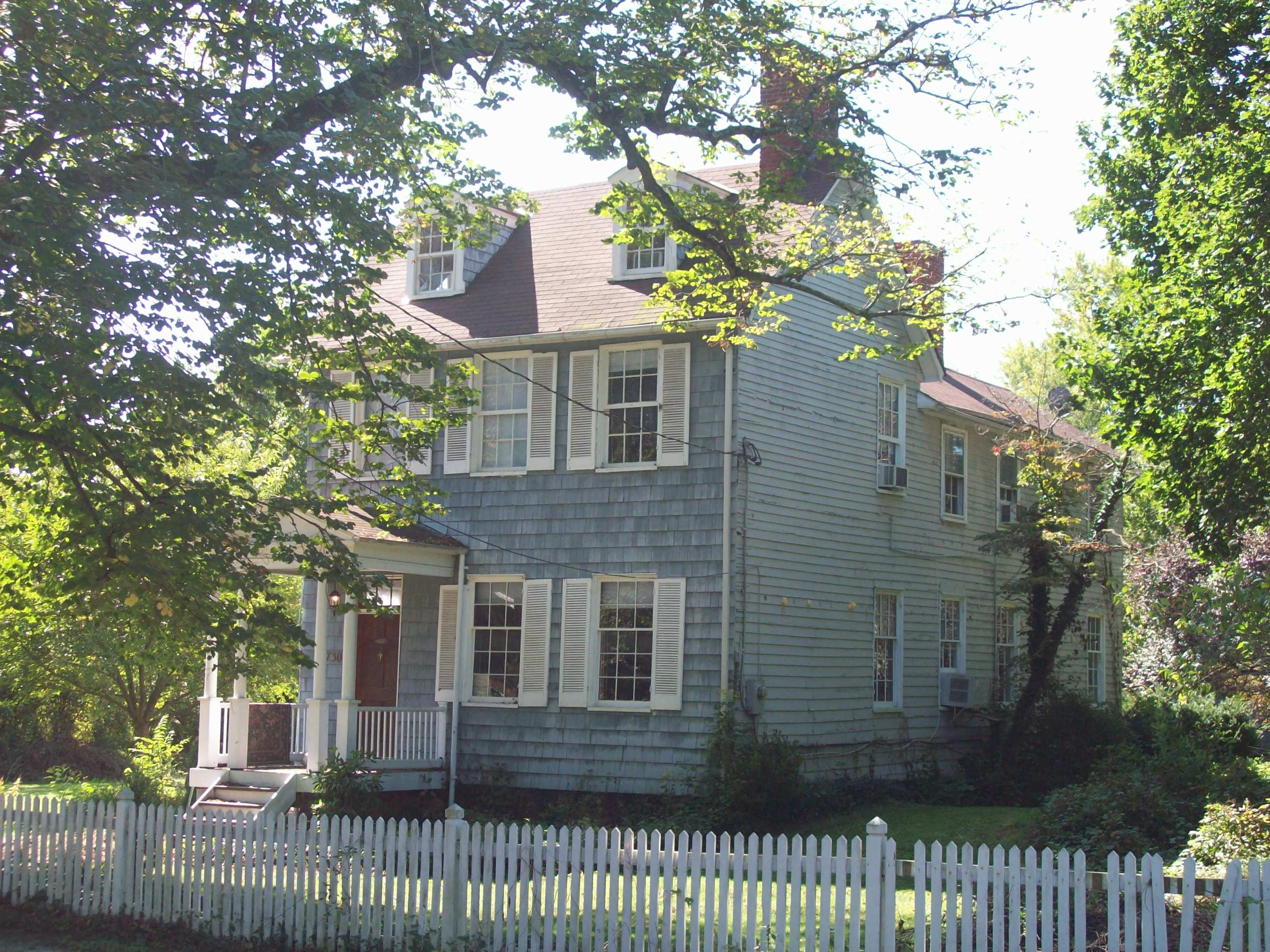
Elkridge Furnace Frame Dwelling, September 2009

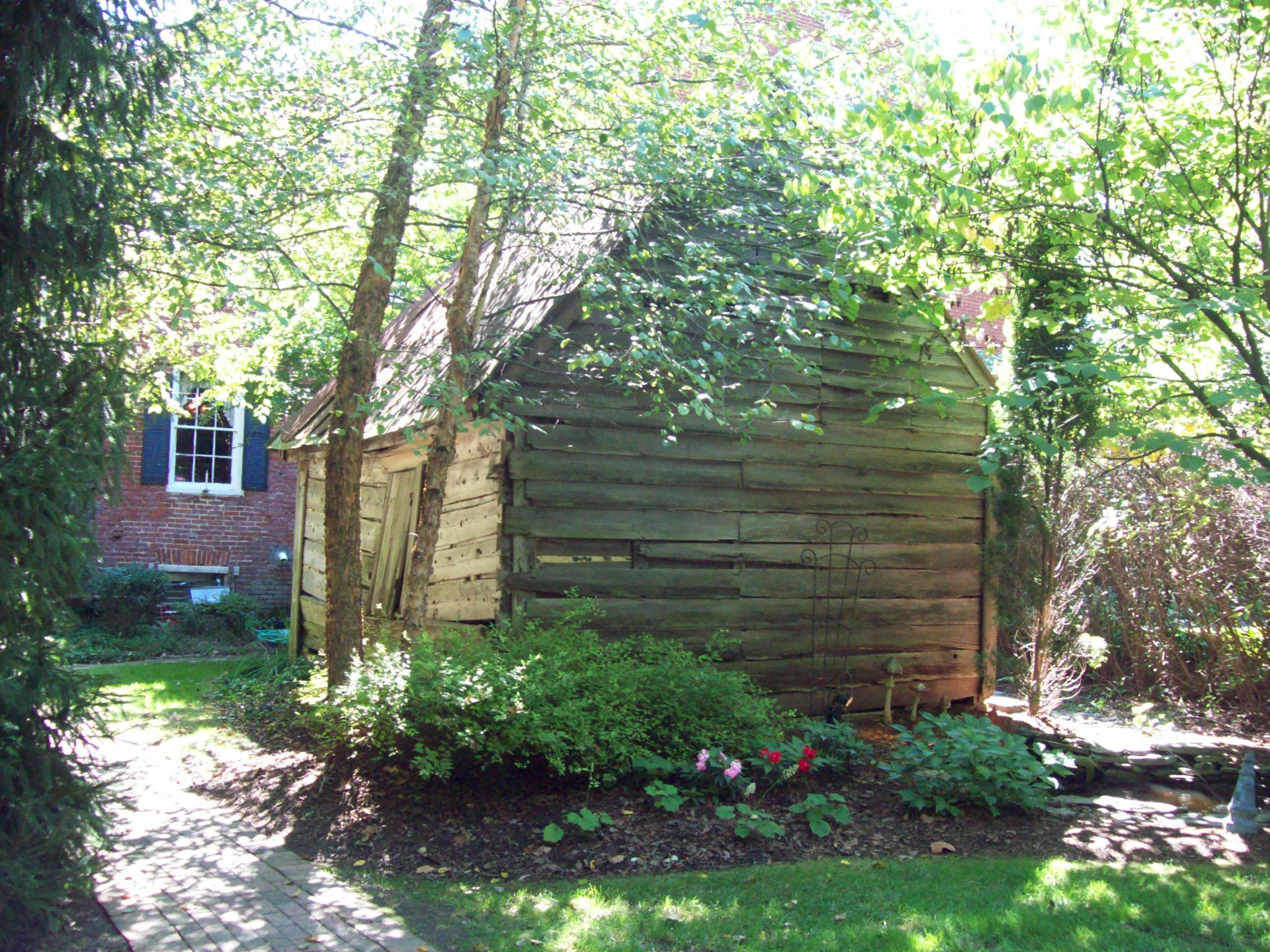
Elkridge Furnace Outbuilding, September 2009

== See also ==
- Hockley Forge and Mill
- Belmont Estate - Nearby estate with operational forge in same period.
