= Patapsco Hotel =

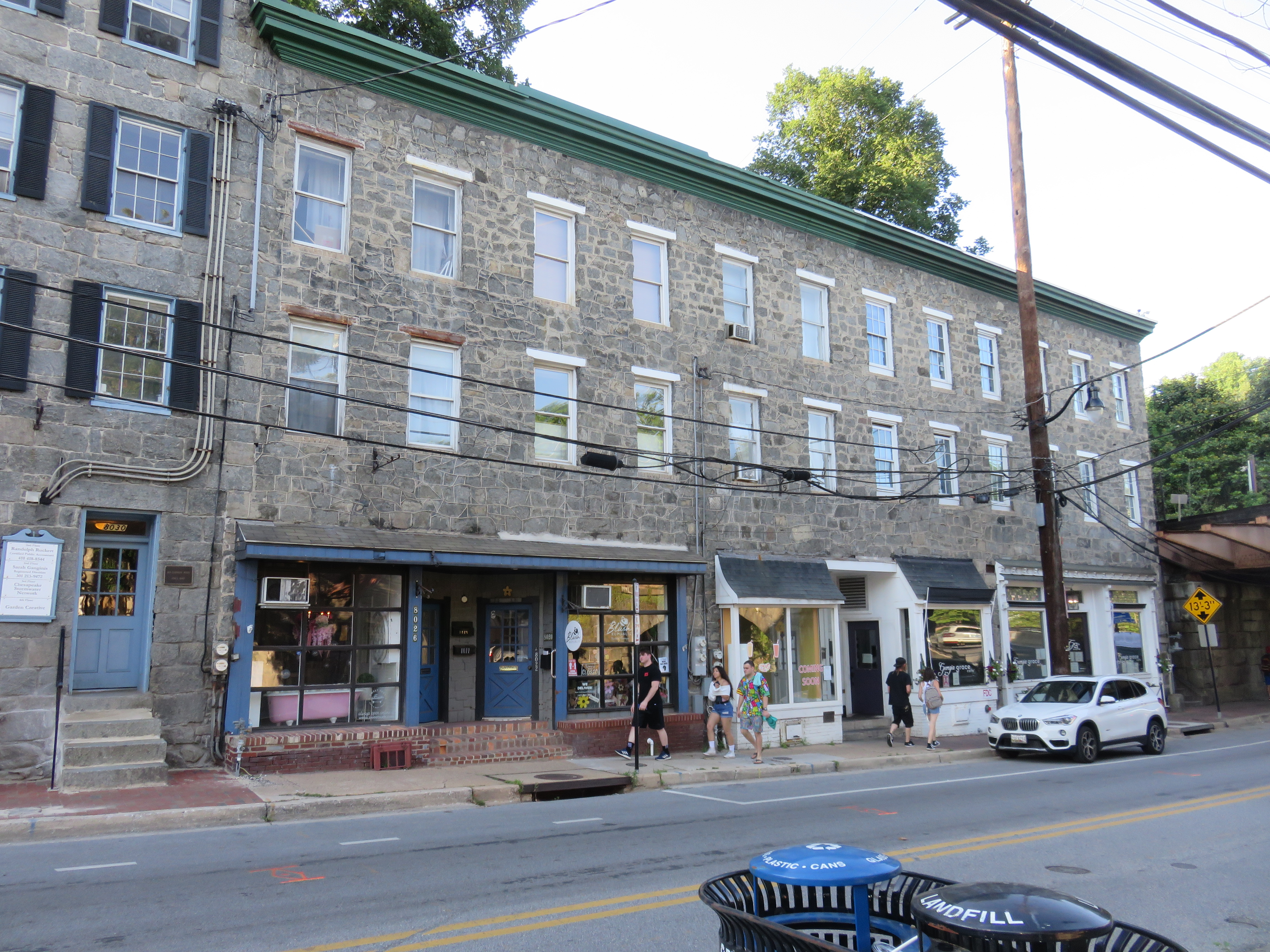
- Patapsco Hotel in 2020

- Location within Maryland
- 39°16′04.5″N 76°47′42.5″W
- Nearest city: Ellicott City, Maryland

History
- Built: Early 1900s, rebuilt 1927–1930

Site notes
- Area: Ellicott City, Maryland
- Architectural style: Stone

Patapsco Hotel is a historic granite building located in Ellicott City, Maryland, on the western bank of the Patapsco River. The current building is built with materials from an older granite construction hotel on the same site and is known as the Thomas' Patapsco Hotel, Wilson Patapsco Hotel, Stewart's Hotel, and McGowan's Hotel.

The original Thomas' Hotel was four stories tall and made of local quarried granite stone block. The rear wall of the first floor is embedded into a solid granite hillside. It served as a stagecoach stop along the National Pike road. The hotel was later renamed to Stewart's Hotel and expanded with a bar and bowling alley. In 1806, Chief Little Turtle of the Miami people visited George Ellicott staying at his home and the Hotel while returning from a visit to Washington, D.C. The second floor balcony led to and served as an unloading terminal for the B&O Railroad at Ellicott's Mills. Henry Clay once performed a speech from the balcony during a presidential campaign. During the civil war, the hotel was considered a host of Southern Sedition. The hotel operated as late as 1879. For a period, the hotel was used for an ice house. In 1920, the hotel, which was owned by Hezekiah I. Thomas was not in use with the windows broken and the county condemned the property. In 1926, a wall adjacent to the railroad collapsed, causing streetcar service to be halted. Passenger cars had to halt as an inspector checked for enlargement of cracks before they could pass the building.

Later, a 12-bay-wide, four-bay-deep three-story building was constructed on the same site with the same granite stones, named the Patapsco Hotel. The original foundation was used, including some standing walls. The building was converted into an apartment house in the 1940s. The building now houses shops on the bottom floor and apartments above. The property later was purchased by Samuel H. Caplan, who operated several long-standing businesses in Ellicott City.

== See also ==
- List of Howard County properties in the Maryland Historical Trust
- Ellicott City Historic District
