= Rock Hill College =

Defunct boy's boarding school in Maryland, US

Coordinates: 39°15′56.5″N 76°47′47.5″W

Rock Hill College was a boys' boarding school and secondary school / high school located in Ellicott City, Maryland, the county seat of Howard County.

The school was divided into two departments: preparatory (for ages nine and up) and collegiate. The curriculum was based on physical education, sciences, and classical studies

Rock Hill College was founded in 1824 as Rock Hill Academy and purchased three decades later in 1857 by the Roman Catholic male religious / education order of the Institute of the Brothers of the Christian Schools (known as the Christian Brothers); Rock Hill College is sometimes referred in older publications as the Christian Brothers College.

The college was incorporated as Howard County's then only college or secondary school for several decades, until the establishment of the Howard County Public Schools system and the first public high school / secondary school in the county in the early 20th century with the establishment of the Ellicott City High School (later renamed Howard High School), as the first of an eventual dozen secondary schools in the county, plus extensive system of parallel elementary and junior high schools, later reorganized as middle schools.

Construction of the four-story structure with 18 inches thick-walled walls of native local rubble stone building for Rock Hill was completed during the American Civil War (1861–1865). During the war, the college basement served as a hospital for both Northern (Union Army / Federals) and Southern (Confederate States Army / rebels) troops. In 1866, Brother Azarias (Patrick Francis Mullany) was called to be a professor of mathematics and literature at Rock Hill College. He was President of Rock Hill from 1879 to 1886.

Famous Baltimore municipal architect George A. Frederick (1842–1924), (who also designed the historic Baltimore City Hall (1867–1875) and numerous other City structures and facilities), was involved in the architectural design of Rock Hill College's buildings. Classes included Ancient Greek and Latin, components of a quality Classical education of the 19th century.

Though not technically a parochial school or parish school, the St. Paul's Roman Catholic Church in nearby Ellicott City created a chapel for the students of Rock Hill College to worship and pray in 1859. The side chapel eventually became part of the church nave proper after the fire in the 1920s.

The building was destroyed by fire on 16 January 1923 while most were in attendance at a basketball game. A chimney fire spread to the dormitory roof, burning all but the gymnasium.

The school merged with the nearby Calvert Hall College, founded 1845 and currently a Roman Catholic educational institution and with an all-boys student body and a high school / secondary school, It was then located 15 miles northeast in Downtown Baltimore at southwest corner of Cathedral and West Mulberry Streets (current site of the Roman Catholic Archdiocese of Baltimore for their Archdiocesan Building / Catholic Center and opposite the historic old Baltimore Cathedral / Basilica of the National Shrine of the Assumption of the Blessed Virgin Mary of 1826. In 1960, Calvert Hall (run also by the religious order of Christian Brothers), relocated to LaSalle Drive in Towson, Maryland of north-central Baltimore County.

A new elementary school was built by the Howard County Public Schools system within the existing stone walls facade three years later after the fire in 1926 and remained occupied in use with public school pupils for a half-century until 1976, when replacement Worthington Elementary School opened nearby.

About 167 years after its establishment and 126 years after their building erection, and 15 years after the school closed, in 1991 the Rock Hill historic property and with its remaining massive 18 inches thick, still solid stone facade walls, was renovated / rehabilitated into new purposes uses and renamed appropriately the Greystone Condominiums, a residential condominium and townhouses complex redevelopment at now 3700 College Avenue.

== Notable alumni ==
- Louis Hamman (1877–1946), American physician
- John L. V. Murphy (1878–1933), member of the Maryland House of Delegates
