= Patapsco Valley =

Valley surrounding the Patapsco River in the U.S. state of Maryland

- Patapsco River Valley
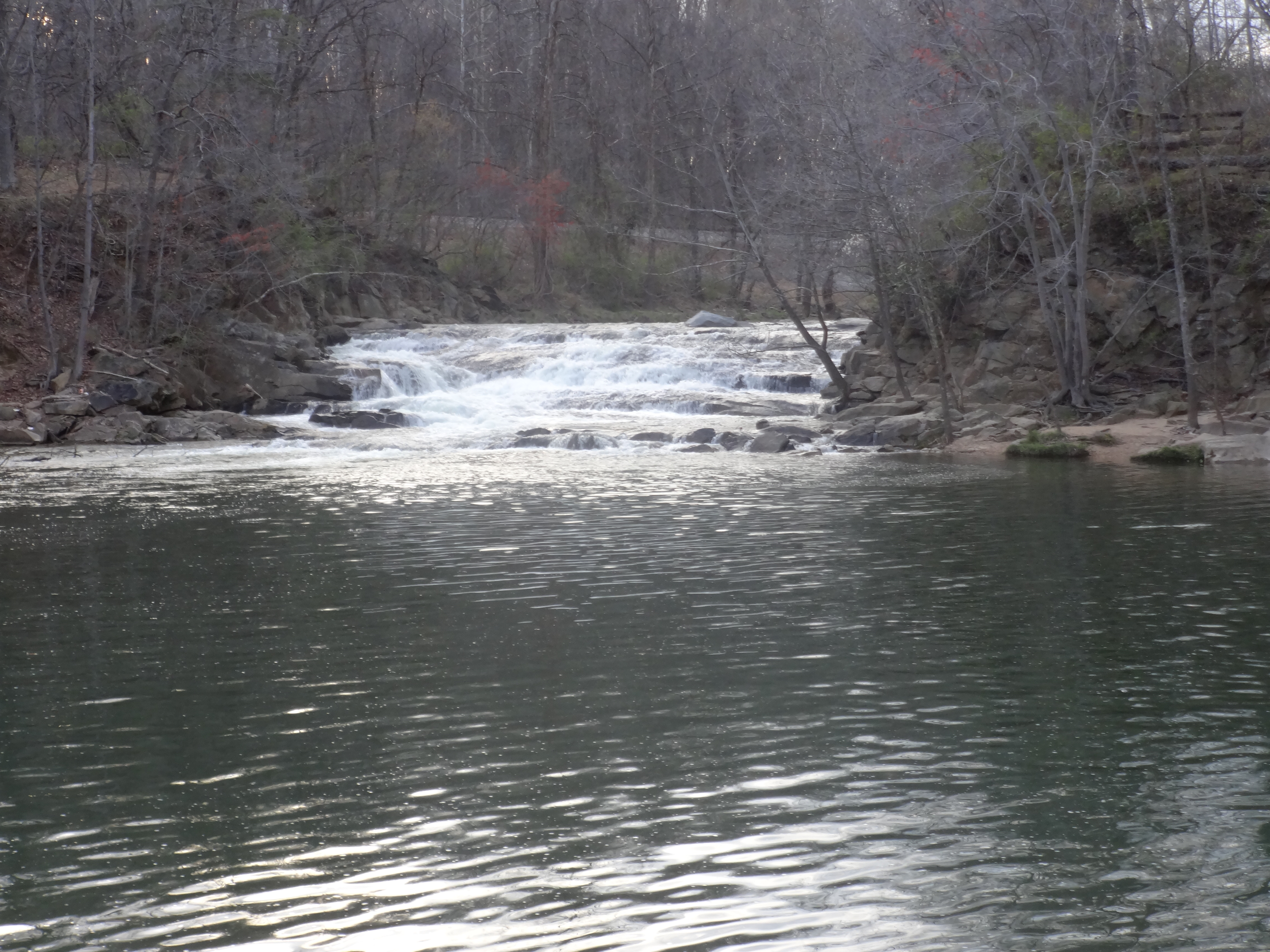
- McKeldin Rapids, McKeldin Recreation Area

- Location within Maryland
- Floor elevation: 260
- Length: 39 miles (63 km) North-South

Geography
- Location: Anne Arundel County, Baltimore County, Howard County, Carroll County, Maryland
- Population centers: Brooklyn Park; Catonsville; Ellicott City; Elkridge; Lansdowne; Linthicum; Marriottsville; Daniels; Hanover; Sykesville; Woodbine; Woodstock
- Borders on: Elkridge Landing(south); Liberty Reservoir (north)
- Coordinates: 39°17′N 76°47′W
- Traversed by: Interstate 70; Interstate 95; Metropolitan Boulevard (I-195); Harbor Tunnel Thruway (I-895); Annapolis Road (MD 648); Belle Grove Road (MD 170); Frederick Road (MD 144); US Route 40; Nursery Road; Rolling Road (MD 166); Old Court Road (MD 125); Montgomery Road; Old Washington Road (MD 97); Sykesville Road (MD 32); Woodbine Road (MD 94)
- Interactive map of Patapsco Valley

The Patapsco Valley is a small valley surrounding the Patapsco River in central Maryland. The region is known for its historical significance as a major economic and industrial center in the eighteenth and nineteenth centuries.

== Geography ==
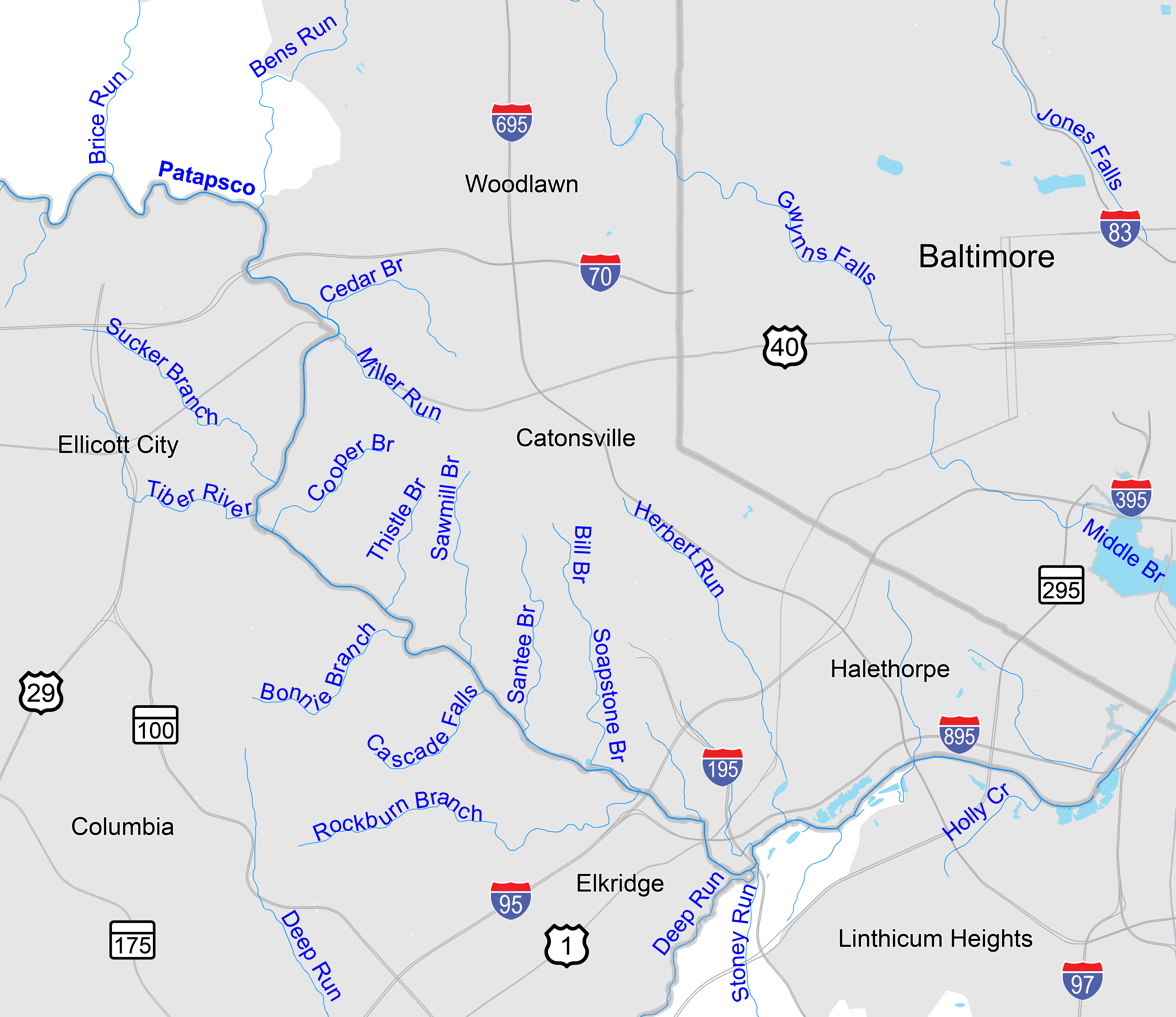
Patapsco Valley Watershed Map

The Patapsco Valley follows the Patapsco River, a major river flowing into the Chesapeake Bay. The valley is mostly wooded with various steep elevations as the valley travels north. The valley begins in Elkridge Landing and runs north through a number of mill town communities until the river splits into two segments. Liberty Dam and its reservoir, located on the North Branch, is a major component of the Baltimore city water system. Besides Baltimore, the river also flows past Ellicott City (the county seat of Howard County) and Elkridge. The South Branch of the river flows east from its source in Marriottsville, Maryland.

Patapsco Valley State Park is adjacent to 32 miles (51 km) of the Patapsco and its branches, encompassing a total of 14,000 acres (5,700 ha) in five different areas. The river cuts a gorge 100–200 feet (35–70 m) deep within the park, which features rocky cliffs and tributary waterfalls.

The valley contains the communities of Catonsville, Ellicott City, Elkridge, Woodstock, Daniels, Hanover, and many others.

The valley is drained by the Patapsco River and its tributaries.

== History ==
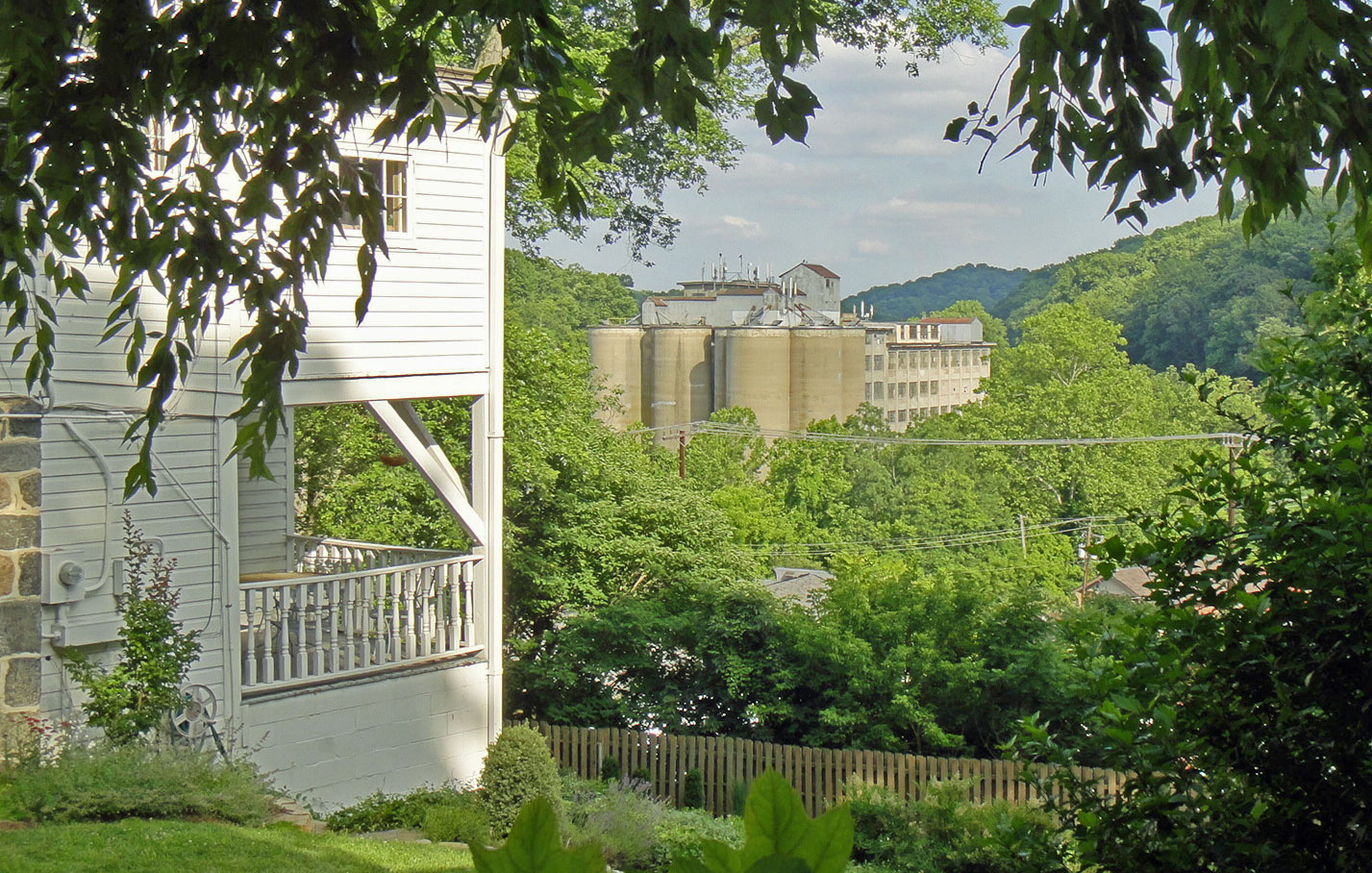
View of the valley from Ellicott City

John Smith was the first European to explore the river noting it on his 1612 map as the Bolus River. The "Red river", was named after the clay color, and is considered the "old Bolus", as other branches were also labelled Bolus on maps. As the river was not navigable beyond Elkridge, it was not a major path of commerce with only one ship listed as serving the northern branch, and four others operating around the mouth in 1723. The Patapsco valley was used as the route of the Baltimore and Ohio Railroad's original main line west constructed from 1829 onwards, and this route remains, though much altered. Many old railroad bridges were constructed in the valley, most notably the Thomas Viaduct and the Patterson Viaduct, of which ruins remain. Flour mills and a hydropower dam were formerly powered by the river.

The valley is prone to flooding, though at long intervals. Modern floods include one in 1868 that washed away 14 houses killing 39 around Ellicott City. A 1923 flood topped bridges. In 1952 an eight-foot wall of water swept the shops of Ellicott City and a 1956 flood inflicted heavy damage at the Bartigis Brothers plant. In 1972, Ellicott City and the Old Main Line railroad sustained serious damage as a result of rainfall from the remnants of Hurricane Agnes.

During the 2010s, Ellicott City was impacted by two significant flood events in 2016 and 2018. These flood events were also due to significant rainfall, in which stormwater overflowed from the Tiber River and Hudson Branch tributaries of the Patapsco River. Due to much of Main Street being built on top of the natural course of the Tiber River, the stormwater was forced to exit via the Main Street channel into the Patapsco during both storms. Many in the community cite the high amount of impervious surface and overdevelopment throughout greater Ellicott City to be a contributing issue to these types of floods.

The mouth of the Patapsco River forms Baltimore harbor, the site of the Battle of Baltimore during the War of 1812. This is where Francis Scott Key, while aboard a British ship, wrote "The Star-Spangled Banner," a poem later set to music as the national anthem of the United States. Today, a red, white, and blue buoy marks the spot where HMS Tonnant was anchored.

== Wildlife ==
Patapsco Valley is considered to be a major hub for wildlife in Central Maryland. In fact, it is noted as habitat hub and corridor by the Howard County Green infrastructure network. Conservation efforts have been made to protect this status through preservation easements along the Patapsco Valley State Park interface. The headquarters of the Howard County Conservancy is located in the upper valley in the town of Woodstock.

The valley is home to typical flora and fauna found in Central Maryland. Numerous sightings of the American black bear have been reported in the state park and surrounding area. In 2016, the Maryland Department of Natural Resources Police filmed a sighting in Catonsville, Maryland.

== See also ==
- 2016 Maryland flood
- 2018 Maryland flood
