= 2018 Central Maryland flood =

2018 flood in Maryland, United States

2018 Central Maryland Flood
- Date: May 27, 2018
- Location: Central Maryland; Howard County, (particularly Ellicott City), Baltimore County, Anne Arundel County, Carroll County
- Deaths: 1
- Property damage: $20 Million (2018 USD)

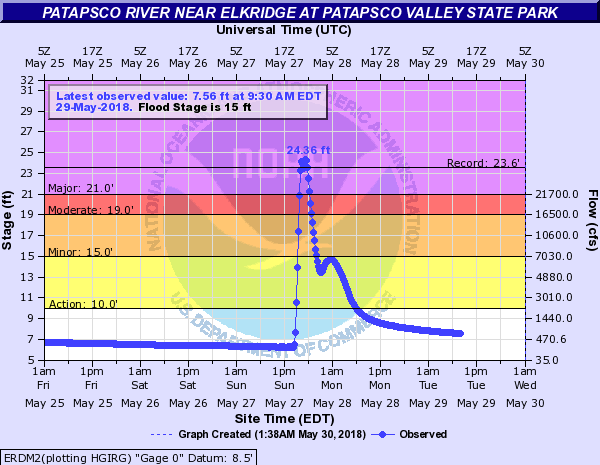
Hydrograph of Patapsco River near Elkridge at Patapsco Valley State Park Purple: Major Flood Stage; Red: Moderate Flood Stage; Orange: Flood Stage; Yellow: Action Stage;

In the afternoon of May 27, 2018, after over 8 inches (20 cm) of rain in a span of two hours, the historic Main Street in Ellicott City, Maryland experienced catastrophic flooding, just days before the new flood emergency alert system was supposed to become operational. Flooding occurred throughout the Patapsco Valley, in the adjacent communities of Catonsville, Arbutus, and Elkridge, as well as the Jones Falls Valley in Baltimore.

The flooding caused a significant amount of damage to Ellicott City, which had been severely damaged in another flood just two years earlier. The streets were covered in water, buildings collapsed, and cars were swept away. It also caused the death of National Guardsman Sgt. Eddison Hermond.

Since the floods, the state and local governments have signed pieces of legislation to demolish some buildings in the historic district.

== History and previous floods ==
Ellicott City was founded in 1772 and built along the Patapsco River. It is located about 10 miles (16 km) west of Baltimore and at the site of the Tiber River, along with other connected tributaries, causing it to be vulnerable to severe flooding. In 1868 three casualties occurred during a flood.

Before the 2018 flood, Ellicott City was severely submerged during the 2016 Maryland flood on July 30, 2016. That flooding was considered an oddity, likely only occurring once in 1,000 years, and resulted in the deaths of two people and the destruction of six buildings. Maryland Governor Larry Hogan toured the recovery efforts, along with Howard County Executive Allan H. Kittleman, and requested that the federal government help with the historic town's reconstruction.

== Flood event ==
On Sunday, May 27, 2018, between 3:00 P.M. and 5:00 P.M. a massive storm released nearly two months of rain, over 9.71 inches (24.7 cm), onto the Ellicott City area causing catastrophic flooding in the surrounding area, which swept away roads and cars, and brought more than 10 feet (3.0 m) of rapidly moving water down Main Street in Old Ellicott City. These flash floods were intensified by the fact the Historic Ellicott City is built at the confluence of three streams running under the streets of Ellicott City. A large portion of the southbound US 29 flooded several feet. Heavy rains and rapidly rising water washed away portions of several roads.

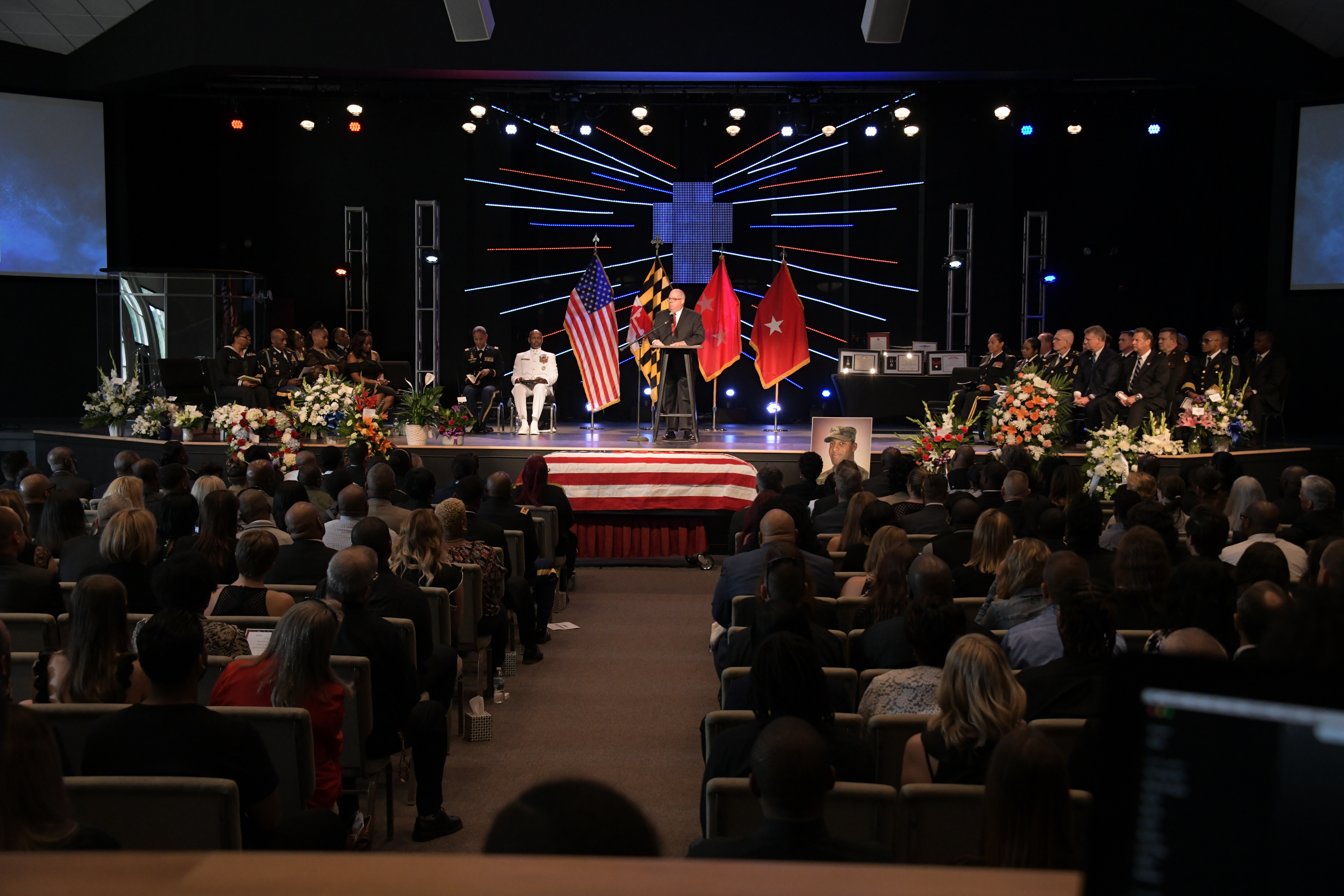
Funeral of Eddison Hermond, attended by Maryland Governor Larry Hogan and other dignitaries

Howard County officials reported that at least 30 water rescues and one missing person search were performed as a result of the storm.

The National Weather Service reported rainfall totals in excess of 10 inches (25 cm) in several areas, with Catonsville receiving the highest at 10.38 inches (26.4 cm) and Ellicott City receiving 8.40 inches (21.3 cm).

According to meteorologists, the storm was "likely worse" than the 2016 Maryland flood because Ellicott City received only five inches (130 mm) of rain during the 2016 flood, which was almost half as much of rain received in the 2018 flood.

The 39-year-old National Guardsman and U.S. Air Force veteran Sgt. Eddison "Eddie" Hermond was reported missing after helping a local business owner who was trapped by rising water. Hermond was swept away by the current. Active recovery efforts were underway on May 28, 2018, and suspended the next day after his body was recovered in the Patapsco River. "We're deeply saddened to learn that the body of Sgt. Eddison Hermond has been found." Governor Hogan mourned Hermond's loss. "There are no words to adequately describe our sense of loss," he said in a statement. "He bravely risked his life to assist a fellow citizen during the flooding in Ellicott City. Our heartfelt prayers go out to Sgt. Hermond's family and loved ones." To honor Hermond, all Maryland flags were ordered to fly at half-staff.

=== Surrounding rivers ===
The water level of the Patapsco River southeast of Ellicott City surpassed its previous peak record when it experienced a 17-foot (5.2 m) increase.

== Aftermath ==
On May 28, 2018, Governor Larry Hogan declared a state of emergency.

Since the flood, the Howard County government sought solutions to fortify the historic district against future flash flooding. There was a recovery website dedicated to the flood set up by the Howard County government. Former Howard County executive Allan H. Kittleman signed a bill which would demolish and remove 13 historic buildings from the city. The plan was funded at $50 million and is expected to be completed by 2023.

The plan to demolish the historic buildings had several obstacles due to the necessary permits: The Historic Preservation Commission required grant authorization for Howard County to raze the structures, The Maryland Department of the Environment required permits for waterways and non-tidal wetlands, and The United States Army Corps of Engineers also required a permit. The approval timeline for the Army Corps of Engineers's permit was extended because demolishing buildings in a historic district could alter Ellicott City's historic characteristics and nature, therefore influencing their place on the National Register of Historic Places.

Howard County executive Calvin Ball III did not support the plan of demolishing the historic buildings, stating that demolition should be a last resort.

Celebrity chef Gordon Ramsay, on his show 24 Hours to Hell and Back, visited the town and did renovations on several restaurants in the town.

== See also ==
- 2016 Maryland flood
