= Brother Azarias =

Irish-American educator, essayist, littérateur and philosopher

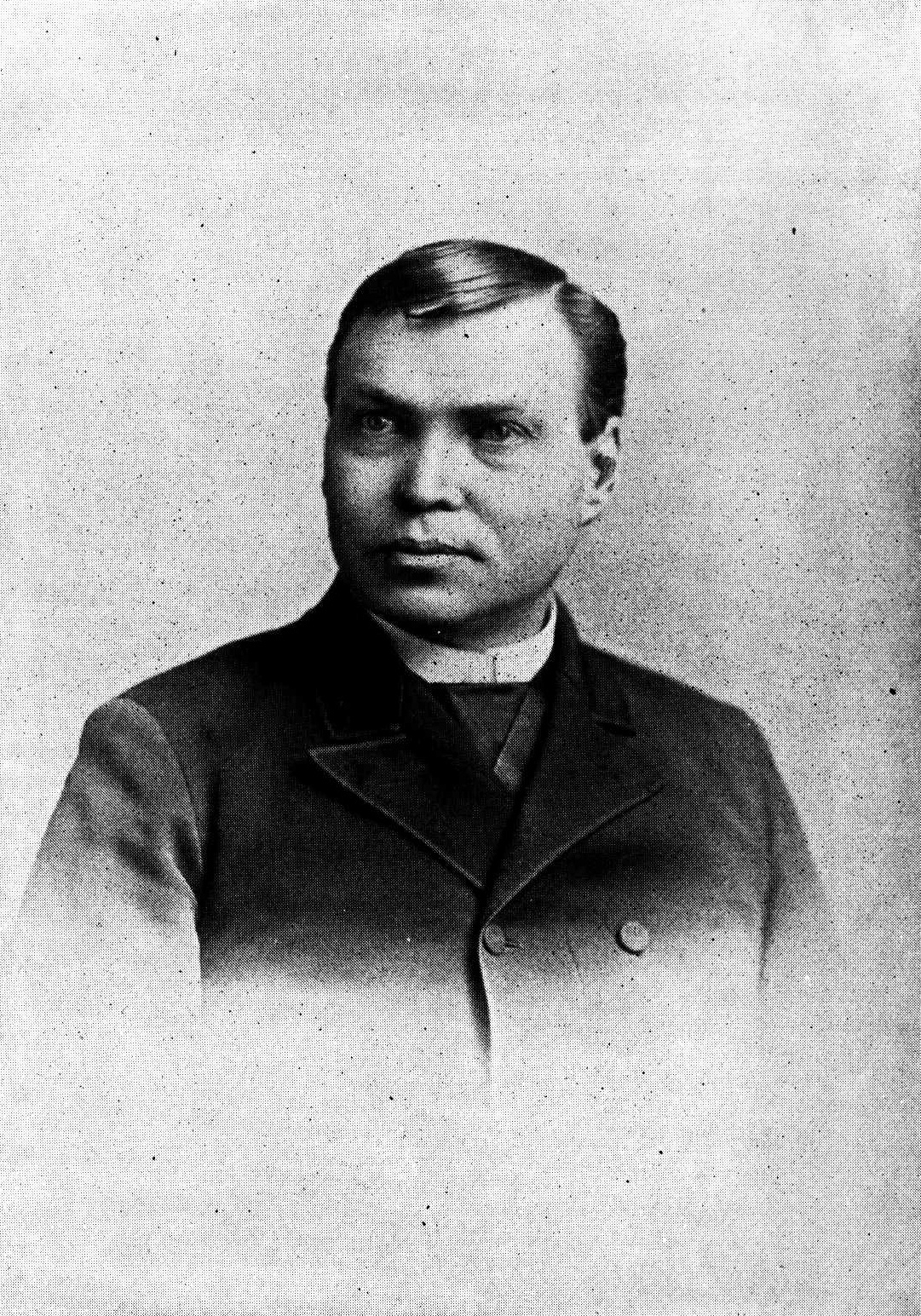
Azarias sometime before 1894

Brother Azarias (Patrick Francis Mullany) (b. near Killenaule, County Tipperary, Ireland, 29 June 1847) was an Irish-American educator, essayist, littérateur, and philosopher.

== Life ==
His education began at home, and after his family moved to Deerfield, New York, U.S.A., continued in the union school of that place, and subsequently in the Christian Brothers' Academy at Utica. Believing himself called to the life of a religious teacher, he entered the novitiate of the Brothers of the Christian Schools, in New York City, on 24 February 1862.

He taught in Albany, New York City, and Philadelphia until 1866, when he was called to the professorship of mathematics and literature in Rock Hill College, Ellicott City, Maryland. Gradually his interests were absorbed by literature and philosophy, which, with pedagogy, continued to hold them until the end of his career. From 1879 to 1886 he was President of Rock Hill College.

Then followed two years of research in European libraries, chiefly those of Paris and London. On his return to the United States, he became professor of literature in De La Salle Institute, New York City, and remained such till his death at the Catholic Summer School, Plattsburgh, 20 August 1893.

== Works ==
He was a frequent contributor to the Catholic World, the American Catholic Quarterly Review, and the American Ecclesiastical Review, and his name appears in the files of the Educational Review and of the International Journal of Ethics. His lectures include:

- "The Psychological Aspects of Educations", delivered before the Regent's Convocation, University of the State of New York, 1877
- "Literary and Scientific Habits of Thought", before the International Congress of Education, 1884
- "Aristotle and the Christian Church", before the Concord School of Philosophy, 1885
- "Church and State", before the Farmington School of Philosophy, 1890
- "Religion in Education", before the New York State Teachers' Association, 1891
- "Educational Epochs", before the Catholic Summer School, 1893.

At the time of his death, he was engaged in preparing a History of Education for the International Education Series.

His first work as an independent author appeared in 1874, with the title An Essay Contributing to a Philosophy of Literature (seventh edition, 1899). Ernest Renan and Ralph Waldo Emerson had attempted to make literature a substitute for religion in cultured circles; Brother Azarias claims in this essay that literature draws its life and excellence from religion.

The Development of Old English Thought (third edition, 1903) appeared in 1879 as the first part of a projected course in English literature, which, however, was never completed. The author begins with sketching the "continental homestead" which was written for the "Ave Maria". After his death many of this contributions to reviews were gathered and published in three volumes, viz. Essays Educational, Essays philosophical, and Essays Miscellaneous (1896). of the English; he then contrasts the Celt and Teuton, examines the pagan traditions on which Christian literature was engrafted, and concludes with pen pictures of Hilda, Caedmon, Benedict Biscop, and the Venerable Bede. The period covered is the first thousand years of the Christian era.

Aristotle and the Christian Church (London and New York, 1888) sets forth the attitude of the Catholic Church towards Aristotelian philosophy in the thirteenth and fourteenth centuries.

Books and Reading (seventh edition, New York, 1904) was originally a reprint of two lectures delivered before the Cathedral Library Reading Circle of New York City, 1899). It attempts to make literature in general, and Catholic literature in particular, a living force for those even who have not received the benefits of higher education.

Phases of Thought and Criticism (1892) contrasts first Cardinal Newman and Emerson as typical thinkers, and then the "habits of thought engendered by literary pursuits and those begotten of scientific studies."

His minor works include Mary, Queen of May, The first of these includes the lectures delivered at the Catholic Summer School, just before his death; the second reprints the lecture on "Aristotle and the Christian Church", adding "Nature and Synthetic Principle of Philosophy", the "Symbolism of the Cosmos", "Psychological Aspects of Education" and "Ethical Aspects of the Papal Encyclical on Capital and Labor".
