= Ellicott City Historic District =

Historic district in Maryland, United States

- U.S. National Register of Historic Places
- U.S. Historic district
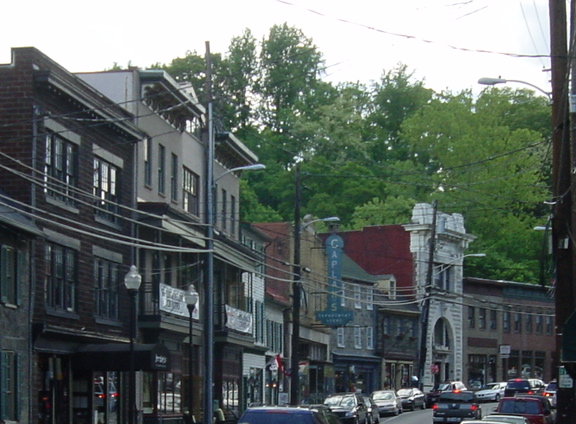
- Main Street, Ellicott City, Md.

- Location within Maryland Location within the United States
- Location: MD 144, Ellicott City, Maryland
- Coordinates: 39°16′11″N 76°48′0″W
- Area: 325 acres (1.32 km^{2})
- Built: 1772
- Architect: Robert Cary Long, Jr.; Charles Timanus
- Architectural style: Greek Revival, Gothic Revival
- NRHP reference No.: 78001467
- Added to NRHP: July 31, 1978

Ellicott City Historic District is a national historic district in Ellicott City, Howard County, Maryland. The Ellicott City Station is a National Historic Landmark located within the district. The district encompasses a predominantly 19th century mill town whose origins date to 1772, including more than 200 18th- and 19th-century buildings. It was listed on the National Register of Historic Places in 1978. The 2016 Maryland flood severely impacted the historic district on July 30, 2016, as did another flood on May 27, 2018.

It includes the Saint Paul Catholic Church, the church where baseball player Babe Ruth was wed.

== See also ==
- List of Howard County properties in the Maryland Historical Trust
- Patapsco Hotel
