= Howard County Housing and Community Development =

County government agency in Maryland

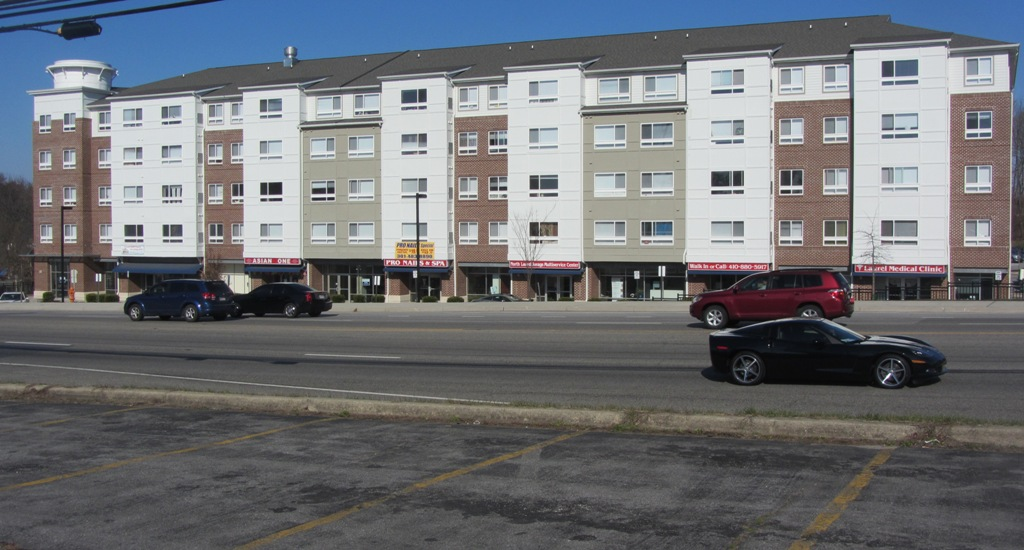
Patuxent Square, A Scott Armiger development funded by the Howard County Housing Commission

Howard County Housing is the umbrella organization for the Howard County Department of Housing and Community Development and the Howard County Housing Commission. The Department is Howard County Government’s housing agency, and the Commission is a public housing authority and non-profit. Both have boards that meet monthly.

The Department administers various federal, state, and local funds which provide affordable housing and support for community development activities. Federal program examples are HUD's Community Development Block Grant and HOME Investment Partnerships Programs.

== History ==
In 1963, the three-member board of county commissioners started a low-income housing program in Ellicott City by condemning properties in African American areas and rebuilding subsidized apartments. Better Consultants of Bryn Mawr, PA was hired to study if the county should bypass federal housing financing requirements and self-finance its housing program under its regulations. Before becoming a dedicated department, Housing was handled by the position of Housing Administrator. Aaron J Roach filled the position until 1979 when he was indicted for using housing funds and crews for his residence. In 1990, the County formed the Howard County Housing and Community Development.

== Commission properties ==
Established in 1991, the Commission administers 50 federally funded public housing units, between 1,000 and 1,200 federally funded housing choice vouchers, and owns over 1,200 affordable and market-rate rental units. The Commission is also a housing developer, acquiring, constructing, and rehabilitating properties to expand affordable homeownership and rental opportunities in Howard County.

=== Development activities ===
Examples of the Commission’s development activities include:

- Beechcrest Mobile Home Park - a mobile home park located in North Laurel, in substandard condition, was purchased to develop permanent supportive housing for the chronically homeless however, the project was moved to an alternate site as a result of community concerns. The residents of the Park are being offered other affordable housing options – rental and homeownership. There are currently no other plans for the Park at this time.
- Burgess Mills Station – In 1965, Senator James A. Clark, Jr. promised the demolition of African American houses on Fels lane in Ellicott City and construction of the 94 unit Hill Top Housing unit if civil rights activist Roger Carter would call off demonstrations. Six acres of condemned land was repurchased by the county and combined with 16 acres purchased from Turf Valley developer Samuel M. Pistorio who failed to get FHA loans to build a proposed 220 unit low-income housing project. The community was redeveloped into a mixed-income, multi-generational 198-unit community of manor homes, apartment homes and townhouses with an underground parking garage. The community also includes Howard County's Department of Recreation & Parks new 45,000 square foot state-of-the-art Roger Carter Community Center; the Center replacing the former Roger Carter Recreation Center built from a segregated Ellicott City Schoolhouse. The Center features an indoor swimming pool, basketball court, exercise center, multi-purpose room, classrooms and climbing wall. This community is being developed in three phases; this is the first phase. Phase II of the redevelopment includes the demolition of a total of 60 aged apartments on the Ellicott Terrace parcel and the demolition of the existing Roger Carter Recreation Center, to be replaced with 75 units (60 on the Ellicott Terrace site and 15 on the former Roger Carter parcel). Phase III is still in the development stage.
- Colts Crossing - formerly known as Alfa Pines Condominium Complex, this 24-townhome community in Ellicott City was acquired by the Commission and converted to public housing in 1990.
- Columbia Landing – a 300-apartment home, mixed-income community built in 1981 and acquired by the Commission in 2008.
- Ellicott Gardens – a 106-apartment home green and affordable multi-family community completed in 2009.
- Ellicott Terrace – formerly owned by The Columbia Housing Corporation, this 60-unit apartment home tax credit community was acquired by the Commission in 2009 and is a part of the Burgess Mills Station redevelopment.
- Monarch Mills – is the former location of the 100-unit apartment and townhome community formerly known as Guilford Gardens, was redeveloped into Monarch Mills, a 269-unit mixed-income, multi-generational, amenity-rich apartment home community.
- Morningside Park - a 60-unit apartment home mixed-income senior community. Property renovation was completed in 2012, including unit upgrades, common areas and systems.
- Orchard Crossing – is an affordable 36-unit townhome community that borders on a community with a similar name owned by Arminger Management Orchard Crossing apartment homes.
- Scattered Site – 65 affordable units – condominium, townhome & single family - located throughout the County – Columbia, Elkridge, Laurel and Savage.
- Selborne House of Dorsey Hall – a 120-unit (48 funded by Howard County Housing) affordable senior community in Ellicott City.
- Tiber Hudson- a 25-unit apartment home mixed-income senior community located in the Burgess Mill Station first phase area.

=== Affordable and mixed-income housing ===
Howard County Housing has also provided financial assistance for several other affordable and mixed-income housing projects, including Columbia Commons, Owen Brown Place, Parkview at Snowden River, Ellicott City Emerson, Port Capital Village and Patuxent Square. Howard County Housing continues its activity to expand affordable housing opportunities, sometimes with non-profit and private sector partners, and by using layered financing sources, including Howard County Government funding, Low-Income Housing Tax Credits, State of Maryland financing, and various federal and private financing sources. Howard County Housing’s portfolio includes units intentionally developed as the vanguard for the nation's affordable, green and mixed-income housing.

== Rental assistance programs ==
Howard County Housing has a menu of rental assistance programs. The menu is as follows:

- Housing Choice Voucher Program - Formerly known as the Section 8 Program, this program is funded and regulated by the U.S. Department of Housing and Urban Development, which allocates federal funds to public housing authorities to administer subsidy to low-income families via a housing voucher. The program assists low-income families, the elderly and the disabled in obtaining affordable, decent, safe and sanitary housing. Participating families choose their units (e.g. single-family, townhouses or apartments) and pay 30% of their adjusted gross income toward rent. The Housing Choice Voucher Program is a family’s vehicle to affordable housing options and access to housing that support self-sufficiency activities in areas such as education, employment and other community amenities.
- Rental Allowance Program (RAP) - Funded and regulated by the Maryland Department of Housing and Community Development and provides grants to local governments to assist low-income families that are homeless or experiencing a housing emergency. Assistance is provided through fixed, short-term monthly rent subsidies and case management to help families achieve permanent, stable housing. Participating families find their units (e.g. rooms for rent, apartments, townhomes, single-family homes, or mobile homes) and pay the balance of the rent not covered by the flat rent subsidy.
- Commission-Owned Rental Housing - This program offers units that are owned and regulated by Howard County Housing to provide affordable, decent, safe and sanitary housing opportunities for low-to-moderate income County residents. The family’s monthly rent payment varies and is based on the family's gross income, unit size and the current rent structure specified by the lease. Various unit types are available, including family and elderly multi-dwelling apartments, scattered site condominiums, townhomes, and single-family homes. NOTE: Some of these units are operated by professional management companies on behalf of Howard County Housing.
- Public Housing - Funded and regulated by the U.S. Department of Housing and Urban Development, which allocates federal funds to public housing authorities that lease and manage affordable, decent, safe and sanitary units to low-income families, the elderly, and the disabled. Public housing units are often contained in multi-dwelling communities but also include scattered site single-family homes, townhouses, duplexes and condominiums.
- Housing Opportunities for Persons with AIDS - To address housing needs for low-income persons living with HIV/AIDS and their families, the U.S. Department of Housing and Urban Development funds the Housing Opportunities for Persons with AIDS Program. The Program is the only federal program dedicated to addressing the housing needs of this population. Funds are distributed to states and cities by formula allocations and made available as part of the area's Consolidated Plan.
- Moderate Income Housing Unit - The Moderate Income Housing Unit Program is an inclusionary zoning program that requires developers of new housing in certain zoning districts to rent a portion of the dwelling units built to households of moderate income. This program offers new rental homes at reduced rents to eligible families. Customers interested in Moderate Income Housing Unit rentals can complete an application at one of the participating communities throughout the year.
- Homeless Subsidy Stability Program - A component of the newly created Coordinated System of Homeless Services and is a housing subsidy for residents that have exhausted all the services of local homeless prevention, housing stability, rapid re-housing and/or shelter programs, and continue to be unable to secure affordable, stable housing due to extreme and often multiple barriers to conventional, permanent housing. Howard County Executive Ken Ulman approved $150,000 to fund the Homeless Subsidy Stability Program, and the Howard County Department of Citizen Services partnered with the Howard County Housing Commission to administer the program. At present (2013), seven families have been deemed eligible and are in various aspects of the housing process.

== Community development programs ==
Howard County, Maryland, is an entitlement jurisdiction. Thus, it has been approved by the Department of Housing and Urban Development to receive federal grant funds to affirmatively further fair housing through activities and projects that create, support or supplement affordable housing. The menu of community development programs are as follows:

- Community Development Block Grant - The Community Development Block Grant program is flexible and provides communities with resources to address various unique community development needs. The program provides annual grants on a formula basis to entitled cities and counties to develop viable communities by providing decent housing and a suitable living environment and by expanding economic opportunities, principally for low- and moderate-income persons. The program is authorized under Title 1 of the Housing and Community Development Act of 1974, Public Law 93-383, as amended; 42 U.S.C.-5301 et seq. Beginning in 1974, the Community Development Block Grant program is one of the longest continuously run programs at the U.S. Department of Housing and Urban Development.
- HOME - The largest Federal block grant to State and local governments designed exclusively to create affordable housing for low-income households. Communities often use program funds in partnership with local nonprofit groups to fund various activities that build, buy, and/or rehabilitate affordable housing for rent or homeownership or provide direct rental assistance to low-income people. HOME is authorized under Title II of the Cranston-Gonzalez National Affordable Housing Act, as amended. Program regulations are at 24 CFR Part 92.

== Community education and outreach ==
Howard County Housing engages in community education and outreach by either solely hosting or partnering with other entities to host events such as its annual Come Home to Howard County Housing Fair, the annual Housing Matters Mini Fair, quarterly Moderate Income Housing Unit Buyers & Renters Workshop, monthly First Time Homebuyer Freddie Mac Education Workshop, the bi-annual Landlord-Tenant Essentials Workshop, the annual "Mortgage Late? Don’t Wait!" Foreclosure Workshop and other events on relevant topics. Howard County Housing also participates in community programs such as the Howard County Department of Citizen Services' 50+EXPO and other community events and meetings when requested.

== Further organizational roles ==
Howard County Housing maintains an active role in local, state and nationwide industry organizations such as the Affordable Housing Advocates, the Columbia Downtown Housing Board, the Maryland Association of Counties, the Regional Fair Housing Group, the Maryland Association of Housing and Redevelopment Agencies, the Housing Association of Non-profit Developers, the National Association of Housing and Redevelopment Officials and the Opportunity Collaborative.

Additional Howard County Housing activities and programs include, but are not limited to, Shared Appreciation Homeownership, Shared Equity Homeownership, Lease-Purchase Program, the Neighborhood Conservation Initiative, the Emergency Services Grant, the American Dream Downpayment Initiative, the Community Legacy Program, Payment instead of Taxes (PILOT) and the Weatherization Program.
