= John L. V. Murphy =

American politician (1878–1933)

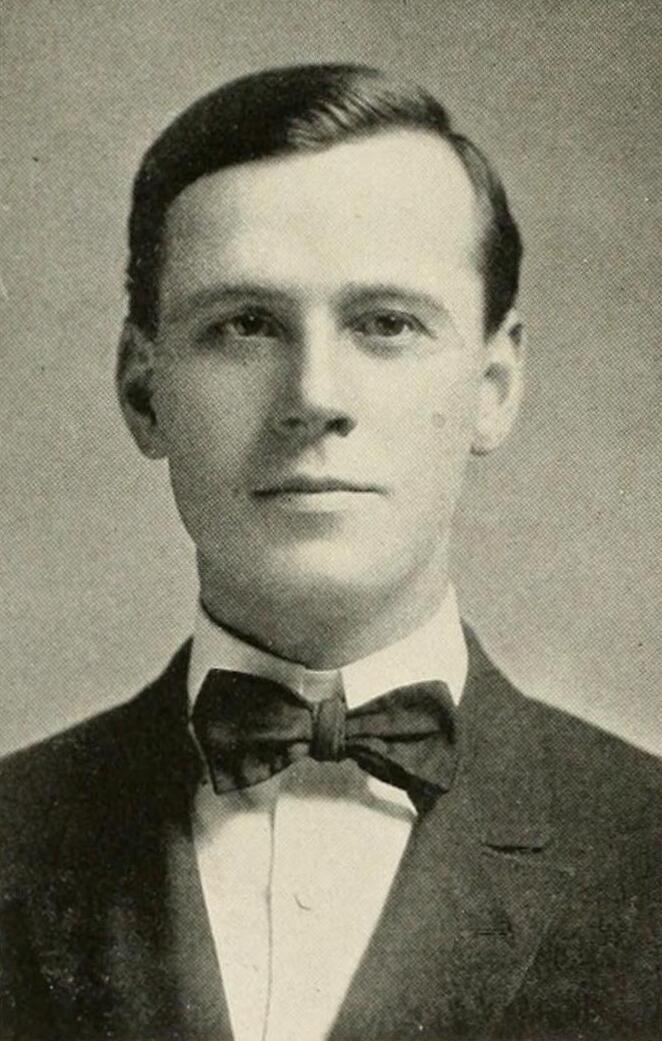
- Murphy in a 1907 publication

Member of the Maryland House of Delegates from the 5th district
- In office 1904–1908 Serving with Robert E. Lee Hall, George C. Morrison, William L. Orem, Louis J. Roth, Henry Trager, Allan Cleaveland, Timothy O. Heatwole, William N. McFaul, Charles R. Whiteford
- Preceded by: District started
- Succeeded by: Robert H. Carr, Allan C. Girdwood, Joseph A. Kuebel, David J. McGovern, Thomas J. Sheubrooks, Elias T. Zirkler

Personal details
- Born: John Leo Virgil Murphy; April 10, 1878 Baltimore, Maryland, U.S.
- Died: August 26, 1933 (aged 55) Baltimore, Maryland, U.S.
- Resting place: New Cathedral Cemetery
- Party: Democratic
- Spouse: Edith H. Meyer (m. 1913)
- Children: 3
- Education: Rock Hill College (BA, MA); University of Maryland Law School (LLB)
- Occupation: Politician; lawyer

John Leo Virgil Murphy (April 10, 1878 – August 26, 1933) was an American politician and lawyer from Maryland. He served in the Maryland House of Delegates from 1904 to 1908.

== Early life ==
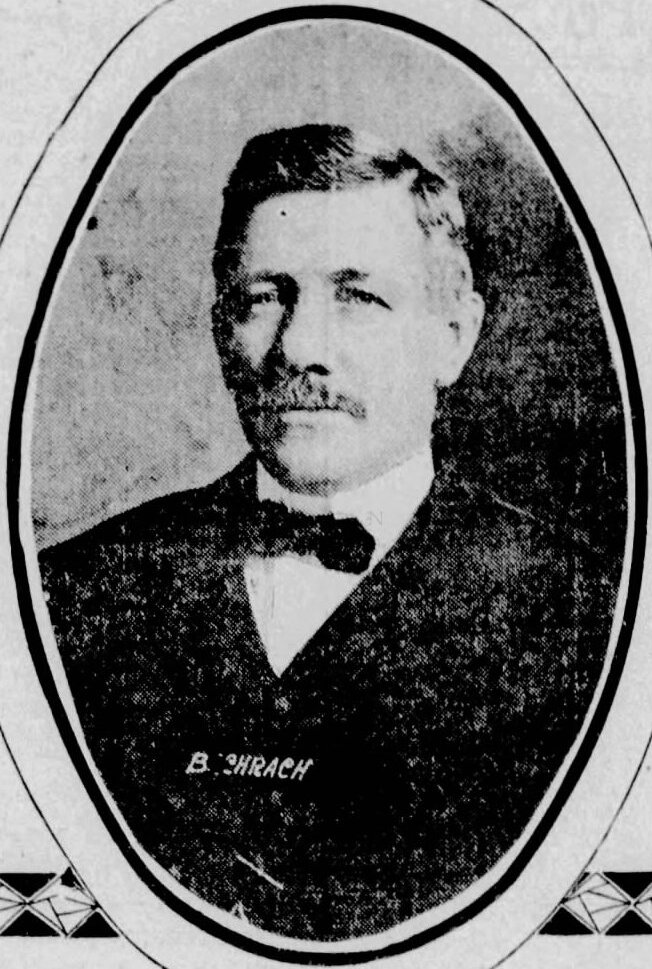
Photo of Frank J. Murphy, c. 1912

John Leo Virgil Murphy was born on April 10, 1878, in Baltimore, Maryland, as one of four children to Mary E. (née Casey) and Frank J. Murphy. His father owned furniture stores in Baltimore, Wilmington, Delaware, and Pittsburgh. Murphy was educated at public schools in Baltimore and Calvert Hall. He graduated from Rock Hill College in 1895 with a Bachelor of Arts and a Master of Arts in 1900. He studied law in the offices of Luther M. Reynolds. He graduated from the University of Maryland Law School with a Bachelor of Laws in 1899. He was a member of Kappa Sigma at the University of Maryland.

== Career ==
Murphy worked as a lawyer in Baltimore. In 1902, he along with John C. Tolson were receivers of the Baltimore Baseball and Athletic Company. He was a Democrat. He served in the Maryland House of Delegates, representing Baltimore's 5th district, from 1904 to 1908.

Murphy was a member of the University Club, the Maryland State Bar Association, the Bar Association of Baltimore City, the Crescent and Democratic Clubs, and the Ariel Rowing Club. He was an organizer of the Young Men's McLane League and gave speeches in favor of Baltimore mayoral candidate Robert McLane.

== Personal life ==
Murphy married Edith H. Meyer, an actress and singer, of Baltimore in 1913. They had three sons, John L. V. Jr., Brian F., and Basil C. In 1904, he lived on Bolton Street in Baltimore.

Murphy died on August 26, 1933, at his home on Clifton Avenue in Baltimore. He was buried in New Cathedral Cemetery.
