= National Housing Act =

National Housing Act may refer to:

- National Housing Act (Canada) of 1938, the first significant federal housing legislation adopted in Canada
- National Housing Act of 1934, the first significant federal housing legislation enacted in the United States
- Housing Act of 1937, also known as the Wagner-Steagall Act, which subsidized public housing in the United States
- Housing Act of 1949, a major post-World War II national housing policy enacted in the United States
- Housing Amendments of 1955 Act, 1955 amendments to the National Housing Act, see 84th United States Congress
- Housing and Urban Development Act of 1965, part of President Lyndon B. Johnson's "Great Society" program, which provided a national system of rent subsidies in the United States
- Housing and Urban Development Act of 1968, a United States law which created Ginnie Mae out of Fannie Mae
