= HOME Investment Partnerships Program =

U.S. federal assistance program

The HOME Investment Partnerships Program (HOME) is a type of United States federal assistance that the U.S. Department of Housing and Urban Development (HUD) provides to states to create decent and affordable housing, particularly housing for low and very low income Americans. It is the largest Federal block grant to states and local governments designed exclusively to create affordable housing for low-income families, providing approximately US$2 billion each year.

The program is commonly referred to as the Home Investment or Home Partnership Program, and is often operating in conjunction with other housing and other urban development programs, such as the CDBG program. Its federal identification number, or CFDA number, is 14.239.

== Benefits provided ==
The government designed and implemented the HOME program to increase the amount of affordable housing for U.S citizens, especially those below the national and state poverty guidelines. The program has four main objectives:

- Expand the supply of decent and affordable housing in the U.S.
- Strength the ability of state and local governments to design and implement strategies for achieving adequate supplies of decent, affordable housing
- Provide financial and technical assistance to state and local governments to develop affordable low-income housing
- Extend and strengthen partnerships among all levels of government (local and federal) and the private sector (both for-profit and non-profit organizations) in the production and operation of affordable housing

HOME funds can enable a broad range of eligible activities that provide affordable housing. Nevertheless, HUD specifies eligible activities that all governments can perform to achieve program objectives:

- Home purchase or rehabilitation financing assistance – In this type of activity, the HOME program may provide a down payment for the purchase of a housing unit to a financial institution, thereby reducing the monthly mortgage payment of the loan balance for a low-income family that otherwise could not afford the monthly payment. The down payment can help fund new housing or the rehabilitation of a family's existing housing.
- Building or rehabilitation of housing for rent or ownership – In this type of activity, HOME funds may fund the building of housing units that the government provides to low-income families. The families either pay a monthly rent or may purchase the housing unit for an affordable price.
- Site acquisition or improvement – In this type of activity, HOME funds purchase property that is later developed as affordable housing. This activity also covers the improvement and rehabilitation of current affordable housing.
- Community Housing Development Organizations (CHDOs) – In this type of activity, governments provide funds to non-profit organizations that provide housing to impoverished or low-income families, including building housing projects similar to public housing projects, housing for the homeless, and developing affordable housing communities, among others.

Among these eligible activities, HUD specifies that governments can use funds to carry out "...other reasonable and necessary expenses related to the development of non-luxury housing."

The final recipients, otherwise known as beneficiaries (e.g. citizens), must be, for the most part, low-income families. HUD has designed a general formula for which all governments must comply with when providing HOME funds to citizens, which is that the incomes of families receiving HOME assistance or funds in a specific area (city, county, etc.) must not exceed 80 percent of the area's family income median or average. In other words, if say HUD determines that a local area's median income is $25,000, then the HOME funds awarded in that area should only benefit those families with incomes less than, or equal to, 80% of $25,000 (or $20,000). HUD publishes the area median incomes plus the 80% income limits every year in its website.

== Administration ==
The program is conducted by non-federal US governmental jurisdictions, such as states, cities, urban counties, and so forth, that receive an allocation of federal benefits from HUD. All U.S. states are automatically eligible for HOME funds, and each receives a minimum of $3 million for the program, while local governments receive a minimum of $500,000 (unless the United States Congress assigns $1.5 billion or less to the program, in which case they receive a minimum of $335,000). However, federal regulations require that every single government that receives funds must provide 25 cents on their own for every HOME dollar used.

If for example a state plans to use $1 million of HOME funds during the year, HUD provides $750,000 (75%) and the State must provide $250,000 (25%) for the program to achieve the $1 million goal. This compliance requirement is known as "matching." States can achieve this by either donating non-federal cash (e.g., cash from operations—not from other federal programs), donating materials and labor, donating land or buildings, or donating any similar resources that help achieve the affordable housing goal. However, HUD may exclude certain areas from this requirement or reduce the percentage if the area suffered a presidentially-declared disaster.

In addition to the matching requirement, HUD has earmarking requirements that governments must follow. This compliance requirement obliges state and local governments to set aside 15% of program funds awarded for providing to CHDOs (see above) and sets a limit equal to 10% of program funds awarded for administration and planning expenses (e.g., recipients must use not less than 90% of total funds for actual assistance, including the 15% for CHDOs).

== See also ==
- Subsidized housing
- Section 8 (housing)
- Community Development Block Grant
