= 2016 Maryland flood =

2016 flood in Maryland, United States

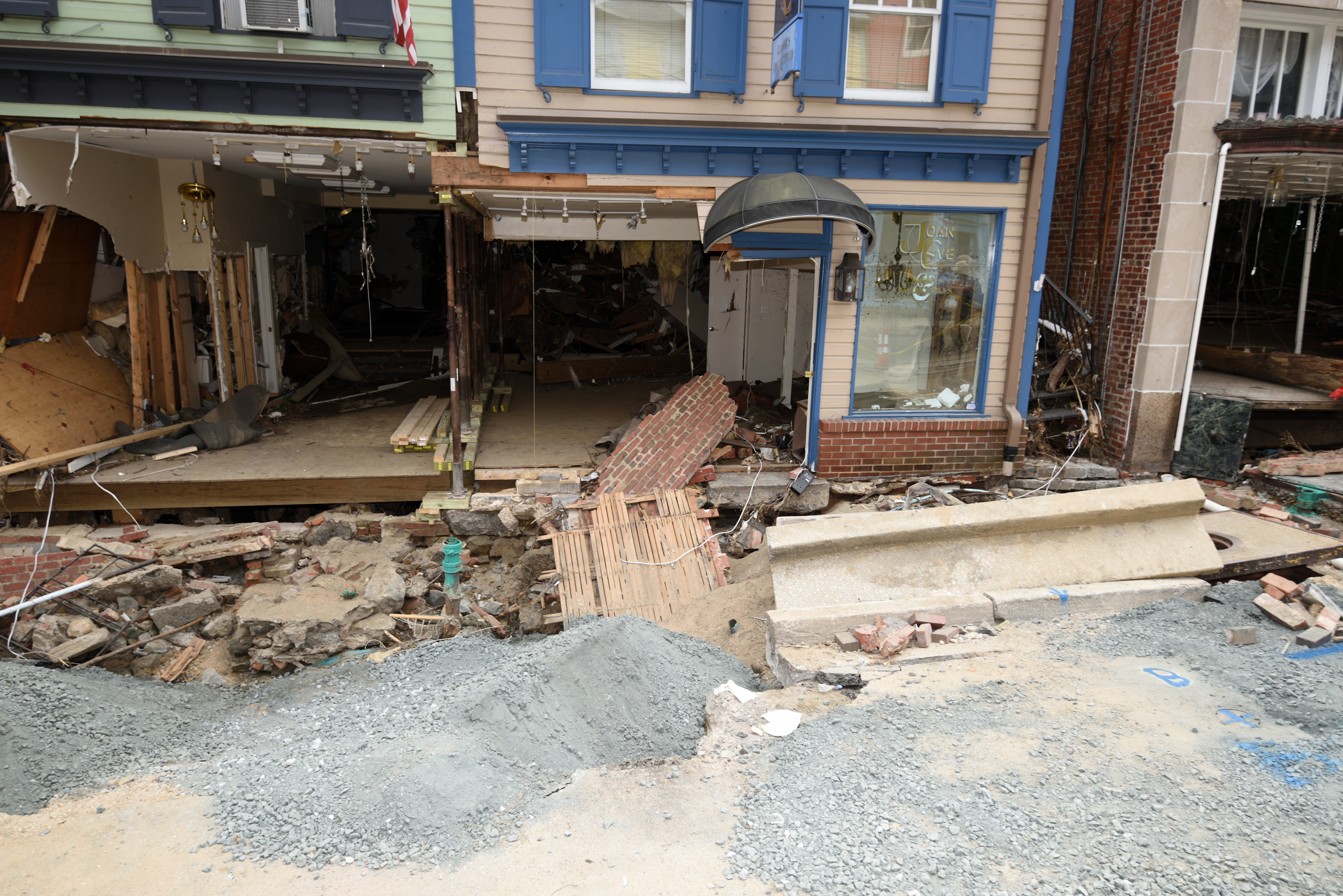
- Flood damage along Main Street in Ellicott City on August 10
- Date: July 30, 2016
- Location: Maryland, United States
- Deaths: 2
- Property damage: $22.435 million (2016 USD)

The 2016 Maryland flood was a natural disaster in the United States that took place on July 30, 2016. The flooding, which occurred in the Baltimore area, affected low-lying areas of the Patapsco and Jones Falls valleys. The storm caused significant damage to the historic downtown area of Ellicott City, Maryland.

== Flood event ==
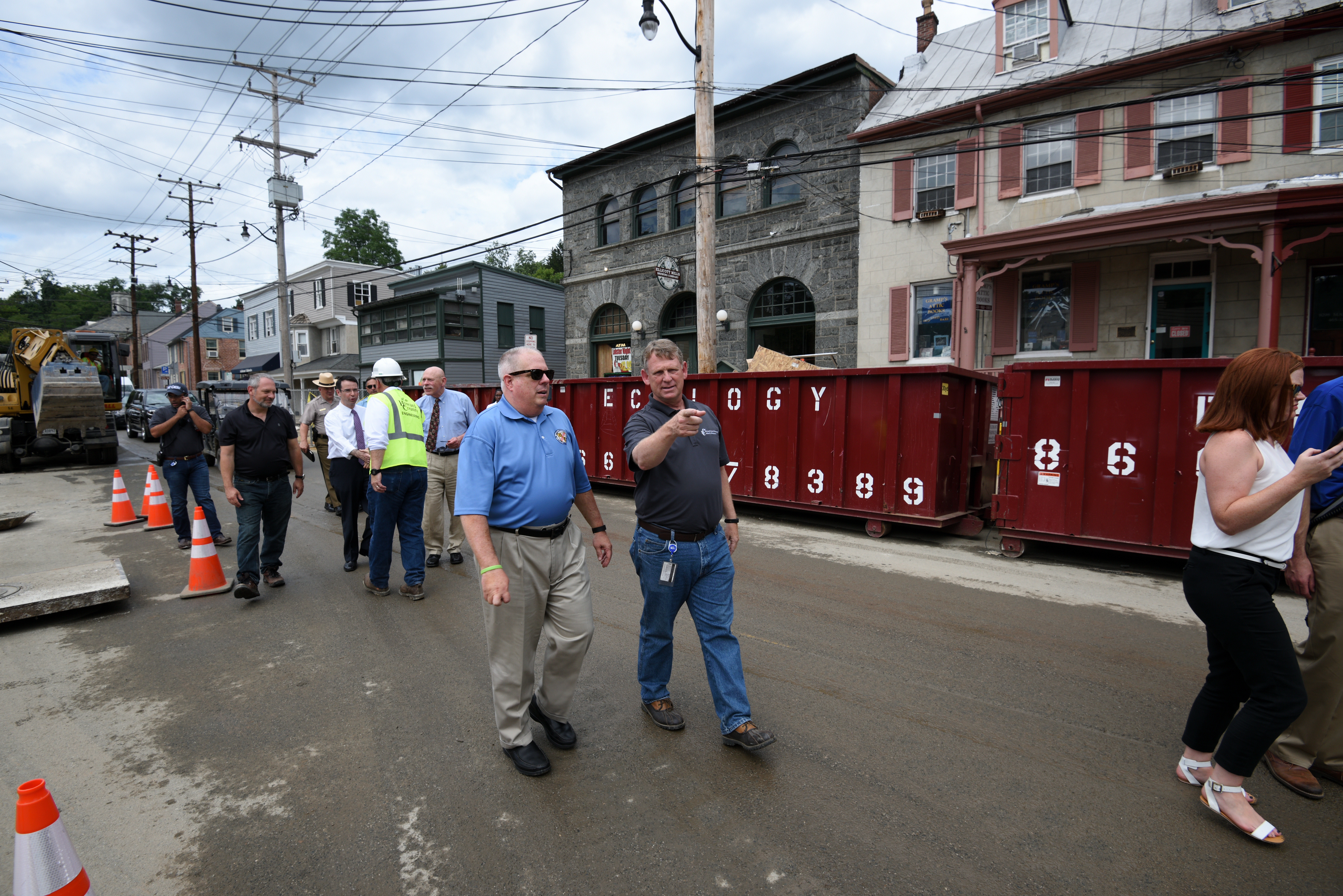
Governor Larry Hogan and Howard County Executive Allan H. Kittleman in Ellicott City shortly after the flood

On the evening of July 30, a severe thunderstorm moved into the area of Ellicott City where it dumped an estimated 6 inches (15 cm) of rain in two hours. The flash flood that resulted inflicted severe damage to the area primarily on Main Street (Maryland Route 144). Flooding damaged many homes, businesses, sidewalks, and landmarks, including the city's landmark clock. Maryland Governor Larry Hogan declared a state of emergency and at least two people were confirmed to have died (Jessica Watsula, 35, and Joseph A. Blevins, 38).

== Aftermath ==
Main Street remained closed for more than two months as businesses and residents cleaned up from the floods and began repairing damaged buildings and sidewalks. The street reopened to vehicle and pedestrian traffic on October 6, 2016. The Howard County Councilman Jon Weinstein (District 1) attempted to put a moratorium on development throughout the Tiber-Hudson watershed, but the push was ultimately unsuccessful in preventing further development.

== See also ==
- Hurricane Agnes (1972)
- Hurricane Eloise (1975)
- Hurricane Hugo (1989)
- Tropical Storm Lee (2011)
- 2018 Maryland flood
