= Glenwood Middle School =

Location
- 2680 Route 97; Glenwood, Maryland 21738; United States; 39°17′51″N 77°01′27″W

Information
- Type: Public middle school
- Motto: Glenwood Cobras Always Rise
- Established: 1967; 59 years ago
- School district: Howard County Public Schools
- Principal: Melissa Shindel
- Teaching staff: 32.10 (FTE) (2018–19)
- Grades: 6–8
- Gender: Co-educational
- Enrollment: 492 (2018–19)
- Student to teacher ratio: 15.33 (2018–19)
- Campus: Rural
- Colours: Navy and Gold
- Mascot: Cobra
- Rival: Folly Quarter Middle School

Glenwood Middle School is located in the western portion of Howard County, Maryland. It is built on land settled in the early 18th century by the Ridgley and Warfield families forming large slave plantations such as "Bushy Park", "Longwood", "Ellerslie" and others.

The design was put together by Lorenz Murray the firm of Johannes and Murray. The plans included an air-conditioned combined "cafetorium" and library. An even more aggressive consolidation of cafeteria, auditorium and gymnasium "Cafetorianasium" was also proposed. The School Board insisted on deciding the color of the brick. In March 1966, the board asked the County Commissioners to sell bonds to fund $1,270,000 for a new middle school and to purchase school sites for the new Rouse development of Columbia. On June 28, 1966, the company of Charles. J. Cirelli, Inc. won the bid to build the school for $1,159,000. The Contract was approved in the same session where Robert H. Kittleman was protesting school board actions against teachers as a representative of the National Association for the Advancement of Colored People. Cirelli built several schools for Howard County and was the employer of Maryland Governor Marvin Mandel after his pardon from mail fraud and racketeering charges. Dr. DiVirgilio recommended additional changes in the design totaling $11,239.69 before completion and J. Norman Otto Co., Inc won the $19,783.00 bid on cafeteria furniture. Water was supplied by two wells and a new requirement for sprinkler systems added another $53,000 to the cost. Ba-Mor supplied carpeting. Cost overruns started with the removal of additional unexpected rock. Jack Kussmau was selected as the first principal and Donald Bell as vice principal in 1967.

By 1996, parents petitioned the school board about lack of maintenance and exclusion from capital budgets for upgrades. Parents listed problems with water on gym floors and in walls, overcrowding and ventilation issues. In 2000, students staged a sit-in to protest the dismissal of a teacher.

In winter of 2016, the school was closed for a week and relocated at Bushy Park Elementary School, Dayton Oaks Elementary School, and Marriotts Ridge High School due an underground powerline short that caused a fire. In addition, from 2014 to 2016, Glenwood Middle School was a center of controversy due to a mold problem found in the portable classrooms.
