= Union Chapel (Glenwood, Maryland) =

Historic church in Maryland, United States

- U.S. National Register of Historic Places
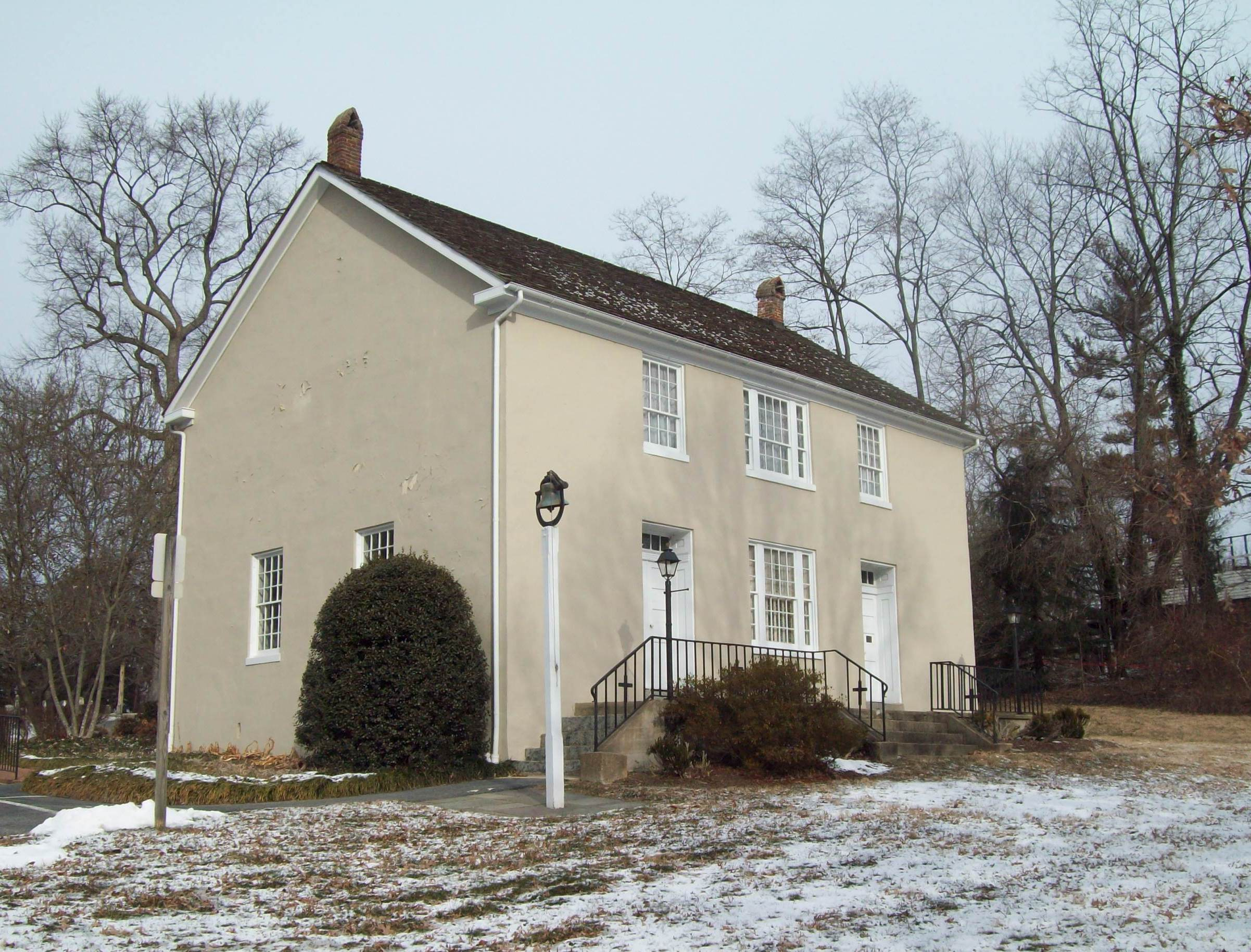
- Union Chapel, January 2011

- Location within Maryland Location within the United States
- Location: 1 mile north of Glenwood on Maryland Route 97, Glenwood, Maryland
- Coordinates: 39°17′45″N 77°1′31″W
- Area: less than one acre
- Built: 1831
- NRHP reference No.: 75000904
- Added to NRHP: March 17, 1975

The Union Chapel, now known as St. Andrew's Episcopal Church, is a historic church located near Glenwood, Howard County, Maryland, United States. It is a rectangular two-story building of stuccoed stone construction painted pastel yellow completed in 1833 for $1,459. To the rear of the chapel is the attractively landscaped non-sectarian Oak Grove Cemetery. Charles Dorsey Warfield, a member of the prominent Warfield family that settled this region, deeded the property to the residents of the area for non-denominational church and community use. The building was constructed for $5,040 In 1886, it became part of the Methodist church circuit.

Union Chapel was listed on the National Register of Historic Places in 1975.

== See also ==
- List of Howard County properties in the Maryland Historical Trust
- Bushy Park, Glenwood Maryland
- Ellerslie (Glenwood, Maryland)
