= Oaklands (Laurel, Maryland) =

Oaklands, Contee
- Location within Maryland
- 39°04′33.1″N 76°51′41.2″W
- Nearest city: Laurel, Maryland

History
- Built: 1792

Site notes
- Architectural style: Federal

Oaklands or Contee was a slave plantation owned by the Snowden family, and remains as a historic home surrounded by residential development.

== Description and history ==
The house is a three-story Federal architecture manor of brick construction, and was built in 1792 by Major Thomas Snowden and his wife Eliza Warfield from Bushy Park, Howard County. The 2,000-acre (810 ha) estate extended westward into modern Howard County. Richard Snowden inherited it from his father. His oldest daughter Anne Lousia Snowden inherited the estate and married Capt. John Contee, for whom "Contee" station of the B&O railroad was named. The house's mansard roof was added c. 1870 to complete the third floor.

In 1911, the estate was purchased by Charles R. Hoff and his wife who was a descendant of the Snowden family.

== Slavery ==
Overseers of this plantation in the mid-1800s were described as particularly cruel to their slaves. Dennis Simms, born in 1841, recalled such in 1937 as part of the Library of Congress Slave Narrative project. "We had to toe the mark or be flogged with a rawhide whip, and almost every day there was from two to ten thrashings given on the plantations to disobedient Negro slaves...We all hated what they called the 'nine ninety-nine', usually a flogging until fell over unconscious or begged for mercy. We stuck pretty close to the cabins after dark, for if we were caught roaming about we would be unmercifully whipped. If a slave was caught beyond the limits of the plantation where he was employed, without the company of a white person or without written permit of his master, any person who apprehended him was permitted to give him 20 lashes across the bare back...We were never allowed to congregate after work, never went to church, and could not read or write for we were kept in ignorance. We were very unhappy...(captured runaways) besides being flogged, would be branded with a hot iron on the cheek with the letter 'R'." Simms said he knew two slaves so branded.

== Present ==
Oaklands is surrounded by residential development, with access to the property off of 13700 Oaklands Manor Drive. As of 2011, the house had a preservation easement and was being restored.

== See also ==
- Richard Snowden
- Montpelier Mansion (Laurel, Maryland)
