= Charles Alexander Warfield =

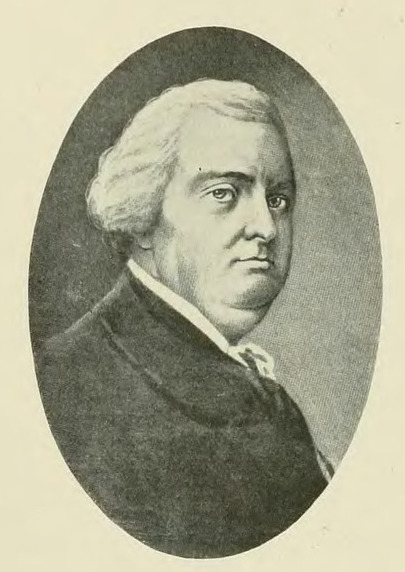
- Born: 3 December 1751; Anne Arundel County
- Died: 29 January 1813 (aged 61); Bushy Park
- Spouse(s): Eliza Ridgely Warfield
- Children: Henry Ridgely Warfield

Charles Alexander Warfield (1751–1813) was an American in the Howard District of Anne Arundel County Maryland. He was president of the board of regents of the University of Maryland from 1812 to 1813.

== Early life ==
Warfield was born in Anne Arundel County, Maryland, on December 3, 1751, and was the son of Azel Warfield and Sarah A Griffith.

He attended the University of Philadelphia without graduation. He was a leader of the Whig Club at the beginning of the American Revolution. His members wore hats inscribed "Liberty and Independence, or the Death in pursuit of it". On October 19, 1774, was one of the leaders that burned the Peggy Stewart in retaliation to sanctions on Americans following the Boston Tea Party. A painting of the incident resides in the State House at Annapolis and the Court House at Baltimore. In 1776 Warfield became the First Major of the Elk Ridge Battalion and began manufacturing saltpetre. In 1777 he became a judge of the Anne Arundel County court.

In 1803, he granted the 510-acre Paternal Gift Farm, Maryland to his son Gustavius Warfield.

== "Bushy Park" ==
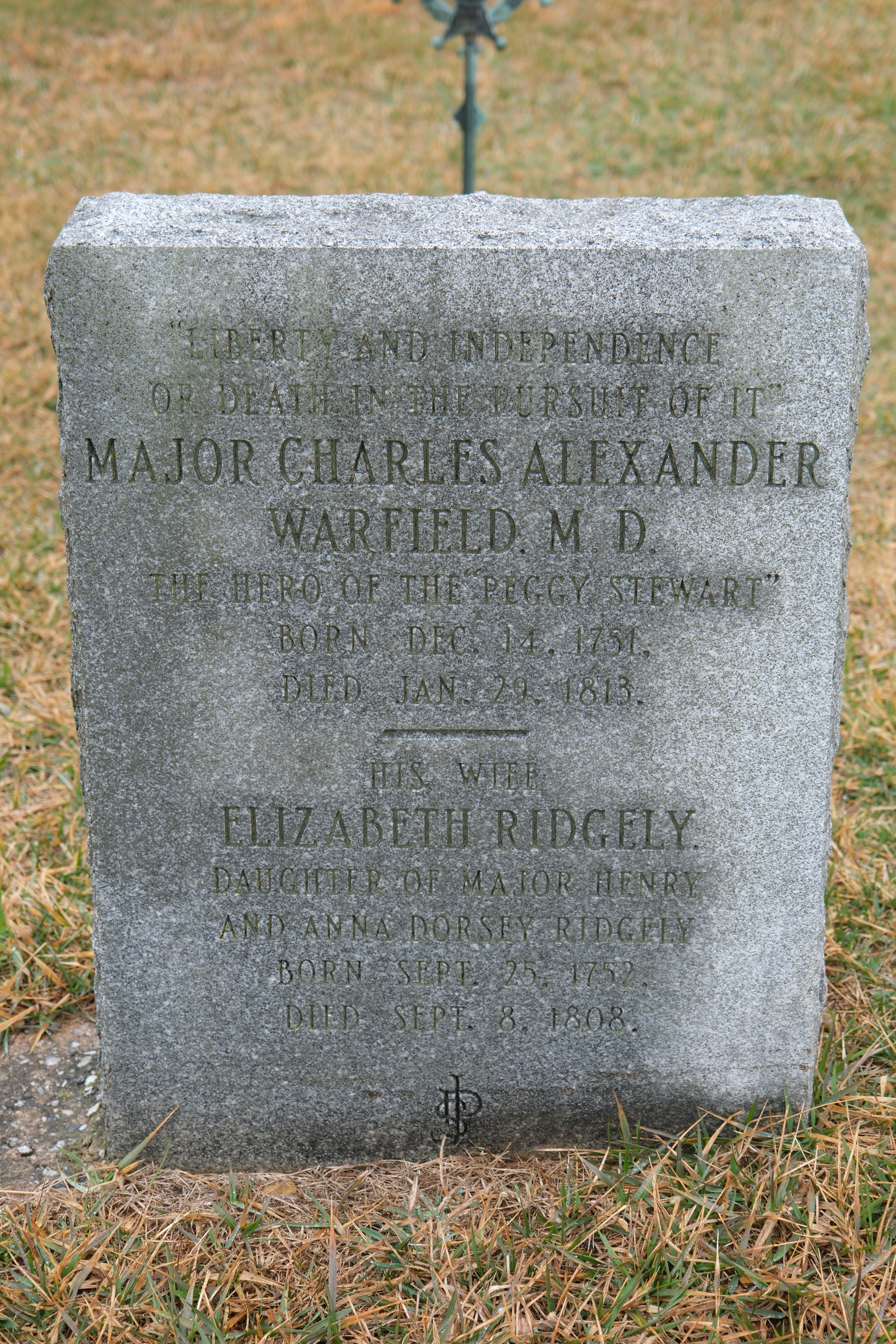
Grave of Warfield in Bushy Park Cemetery

Warfield married Elizabeth Ridgley of Laurel in 1771 and settled in a log home at "Bushy Park" in Glenwood, Maryland. The same year he started construction on his slave plantation manor home. The property later was owned by the "Hammond" family of the Major Charles Family line. The manor stood for over 150 years, burning in 1933 and demolished in 1947. A new house was built over the original foundation. In 1978 the property was purchased by the Clevenger family and had been subdivided down to 342 acres, but was still actively farmed. In 1983 it had been subdivided down to a 190-acre parcel named "Bushy Park Farm" and sold again. A portion of the original estate became the Carr's Mill Landfill, which became a site of hazardous waste dumping by Western Electric in the 1970s. Howard County spent millions of dollars to cap the landfill and dispose of hazardous materials after contamination of groundwater on the site. Warfield is buried at Bushy Park. The walled cemetery remains, but the majority of the 1300-acre farm has been redeveloped as the Western Regional Park, operated by Howard County.
