= Ellerslie (Glenwood, Maryland) =

- Location within Maryland
- 39°17′39″N 77°01′18″W
- Nearest city: Glenwood, Maryland

History
- Built: abt 1763

Site notes
- Architectural style: Georgian

Ellerslie Plantation is a historic home and plantation located in Glenwood in Howard County, Maryland, United States,

The Elerslie slave plantation was built on the lands of Captain Thomas Hobbs given to his daughter Amelia. Jasper and Amelia Peddicord built a house (later side-by-side) around a log hunting lodge built about 1763. These were built on portion of land patented as Ridgley's Great Range. In 1830, Richard Snowden purchased the land for a wedding present. In 1835, Nicholas Snowden of Montpeiler married Elizabeth Ridgley Warfield. Richard and his sons left to pursue the California Gold Rush. The House was purchased in 1845 by Basil Crapster who expanded the house to an unusual mirrored layout with a duplicate addition on the Western Portion. In 1945 Jaessie Hakes and his wife purchased the manor and 132 acres of surrounding land plus adjoining properties which have been subdivided for residential construction.

The manor is a two and one-half story house with stone construction. Outbuildings include a stone spring house and wood barn built in the late 1700s.

== See also ==
- List of Howard County properties in the Maryland Historical Trust
- Round About Hills
- Bushy Park, Glenwood Maryland
- Carr's Mill Landfill
