= W18 =

W18 may refer to:

- W-18 (drug), a designer drug
- British NVC community W18, a woodland community in the British National Vegetation Classification system
- Hansa-Brandenburg W.18, a German flying boat fighter
- HMS St Aubin (W18), a tug of the Royal Navy
- Malgana language
- Mercedes-Benz W18, an automobile
- Snub dodecahedron
- Suburban Airport, in Anne Arundel County, Maryland, United States
- W18 engine, an eighteen-cylinder engine
- Water-jugs-in-stand (hieroglyph), an Egyptian hieroglyph
