= Birmingham Manor (Maryland) =

Building in Anne Arundel County, Maryland, US

- Location within Maryland
- 39°04′32″N 76°49′33″W
- Location: Laurel, Maryland

History
- Built: 1690

Site notes
- Architectural style: Stone

Birmingham Manor was a historic slave plantation home located in Anne Arundel County, Maryland

The manor served the Snowden family for five generations. The property resided on the "Robinhood's Forest" land patent. The manor was built by Richard Snowden Jr. and constructed out of brick with shingle siding. A central hall was surrounded by fireplaces. A semicircle of barns held tobacco crops. A boxwood garden led to the cemetery. By 1790 the estate composed 10,000 acres. The house burned down on August 20, 1891 under William Snowden’s ownership. The fire broke open a hidden wood panel above a mantle that contained hidden family parchments just before they burned. A large tract of the estate became the Fort George G. Meade and the Patuxent Wildlife Research Center The Baltimore–Washington Parkway was built over the plantation site next to a general aviation airport. The family cemetery remains mostly inaccessible.

== See also ==
- Richard Snowden
- Suburban Airport
