= Brian Johnston (center) =

American football player (born 1962)

No. 59
- Position: Center

Personal information
- Born: November 26, 1962 (age 63); Highland, Maryland, U.S.
- Listed height: 6 ft 3 in (1.91 m)
- Listed weight: 275 lb (125 kg)

Career information
- High school: Glenelg (Glenelg, Maryland)
- College: North Carolina (1981–1984)
- NFL draft: 1985: 3rd round, 73rd overall pick

Career history
- New York Giants (1985–1987)

Awards and highlights
- Super Bowl champion (XXI)

Career NFL statistics
- Games played: 9
- Stats at Pro Football Reference

Joseph Brian Johnston (born November 26, 1962) is an American former professional football player who was a center for two seasons with the New York Giants of the National Football League (NFL). He was selected by the Giants in the third round of the 1985 NFL draft after playing college football at the University of North Carolina at Chapel Hill. He was a member of the Giants team that won Super Bowl XXI.

== Early life and college ==
Joseph Brian Johnston was born on November 26, 1962, in Highland, Maryland. He attended Glenelg High School in Glenelg, Maryland.

Johnston was a four-year letterman for the North Carolina Tar Heels of the University of North Carolina at Chapel Hill from 1981 to 1984. He joined the Tar Heels as a defensive lineman but ended up spending his first two seasons as a backup center. He then moved to defensive tackle as a junior before switching back to center partway through his senior year.

== Professional career ==
Johnston was selected by the New York Giants in the third round, with the 73rd overall pick, of the 1985 NFL draft. He officially signed with the team on July 15. He was placed on injured reserve on August 14, 1985, and spent the entire season there. He was released by the Giants the next year on August 26, 1986, but soon re-signed on September 2. He played in four regular season games for the Giants during the 1985 season. Johnston also appeared in two playoff games that season, including the victory over the Denver Broncos in Super Bowl XXI. He played in five games in 1987 and became a free agent after the season.
