= Lisbon, Maryland =

- Census-designated place
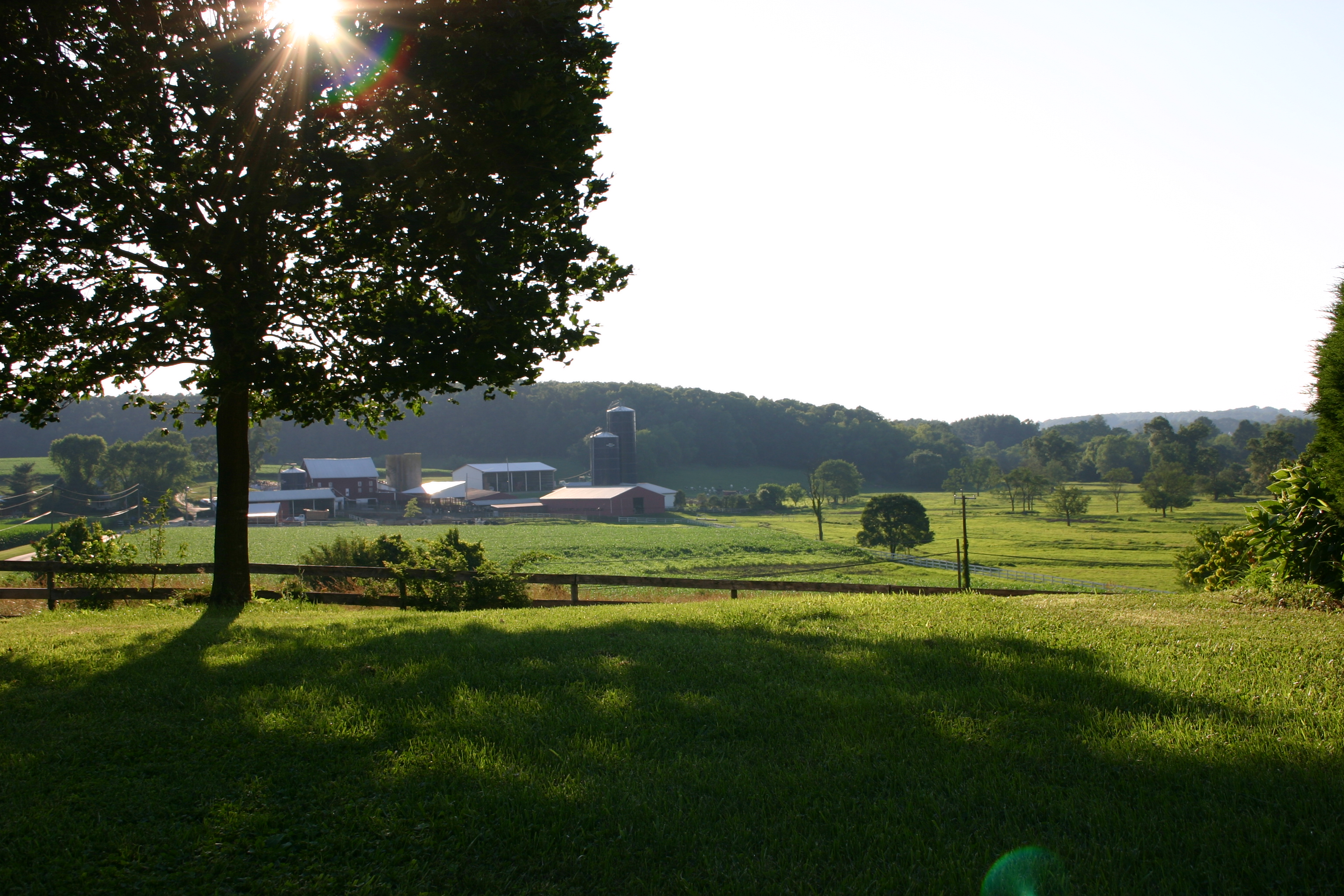
- Dairy farm near Lisbon

- Location within Maryland Location within the United States
- Coordinates: 39°20′13″N 77°04′25″W
- Country: United States of America
- State: Maryland
- County: Howard

Area
  - Total: 1.48 sq mi (3.83 km^{2})
  - Land: 1.47 sq mi (3.82 km^{2})
  - Water: 0.0039 sq mi (0.01 km^{2})
- Elevation: 577 ft (176 m)

Population (2020)
  - Total: 282
  - Density: 191.1/sq mi (73.78/km^{2})
- Time zone: UTC-5 (Eastern (EST))
  - Summer (DST): UTC-4 (EDT)
- FIPS code: 24-47250
- GNIS feature ID: 2806300

Lisbon is a census-designated place located in western Howard County in the state of Maryland, United States, located roughly between Baltimore and Frederick and north of Washington, D.C. It is contained in an area of roughly one square mile. Lisbon is located along Interstate 70 and Maryland Route 144 and is home to the first roundabout in Maryland (opened in 1993). It first appeared as a CDP in the 2020 Census with a population of 282.

== History ==
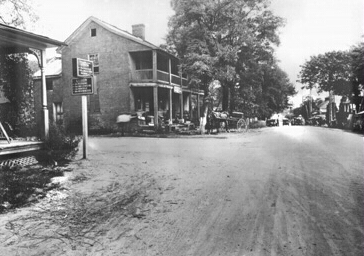
The National Road passed through the middle of the village of Lisbon, with the 1804 Caleb Pancoast House in background- picture circa August 1912.

Lisbon is situated on a land grant patented by Seth Warfield in 1794 as "Warfield's Forest". The town was founded by Caleb Pancoast in 1810. Named "New Lisbon", followed by a shortened "Lisbon" name (not Portugal's capital). In 1820, Pancoast deeded land for the Union Church for Public Worship which would become a schoolhouse with gravesites remaining in 1880. Pancoast subdivided the town in 1822 with one hundred lots of a quarter acre in size, including roads and alleys. By 1835, eight scheduled daily stagecoaches ran through town. The town built the single room Annapolis Rock School in 1894, which served the area until 1943.

The photograph is the National Road (now MD 144), looking east toward Baltimore. The road between the two houses is Madison Street. Through the center of town, Woodbine Road runs north for 2 miles (3.2 km) to Woodbine, where the Patapsco River and the B&O Railroad cross the road. About one mile north of Lisbon exists the original road that ran from Baltimore to Frederick. This road runs west toward Poplar Springs and east toward Sykesville. The exact route of this road is not discernible at this time.

Lisbon is home to the Carr's Mill Landfill, the county's second landfill, which closed in 1977 and was the site of toxic dumping.

Lisbon changed from an unincorporated community to a census-designated place for the 2020 census.

== Demographics ==
Historical population
Census	Pop.	Note	%±
2020	282		—
U.S. Decennial Census; 2020

Lisbon first appeared as a census designated place in the 2020 U.S. census.

=== 2020 census ===
Lisbon CDP, Maryland - Demographic Profile (NH = Non-Hispanic)
Race / Ethnicity	Pop 2020	% 2020
White alone (NH)	232	82.27%
Black or African American alone (NH)	3	1.06%
Native American or Alaska Native alone (NH)	1	0.35%
Asian alone (NH)	24	8.51%
Pacific Islander alone (NH)	0	0.00%
Some Other Race alone (NH)	2	0.71%
Mixed Race/Multi-Racial (NH)	17	6.03%
Hispanic or Latino (any race)	3	1.06%
Total	282	100.00%

Note: the US Census treats Hispanic/Latino as an ethnic category. This table excludes Latinos from the racial categories and assigns them to a separate category. Hispanics/Latinos can be of any race.
