= Longwood (Glenwood, Maryland) =

- The Dependency
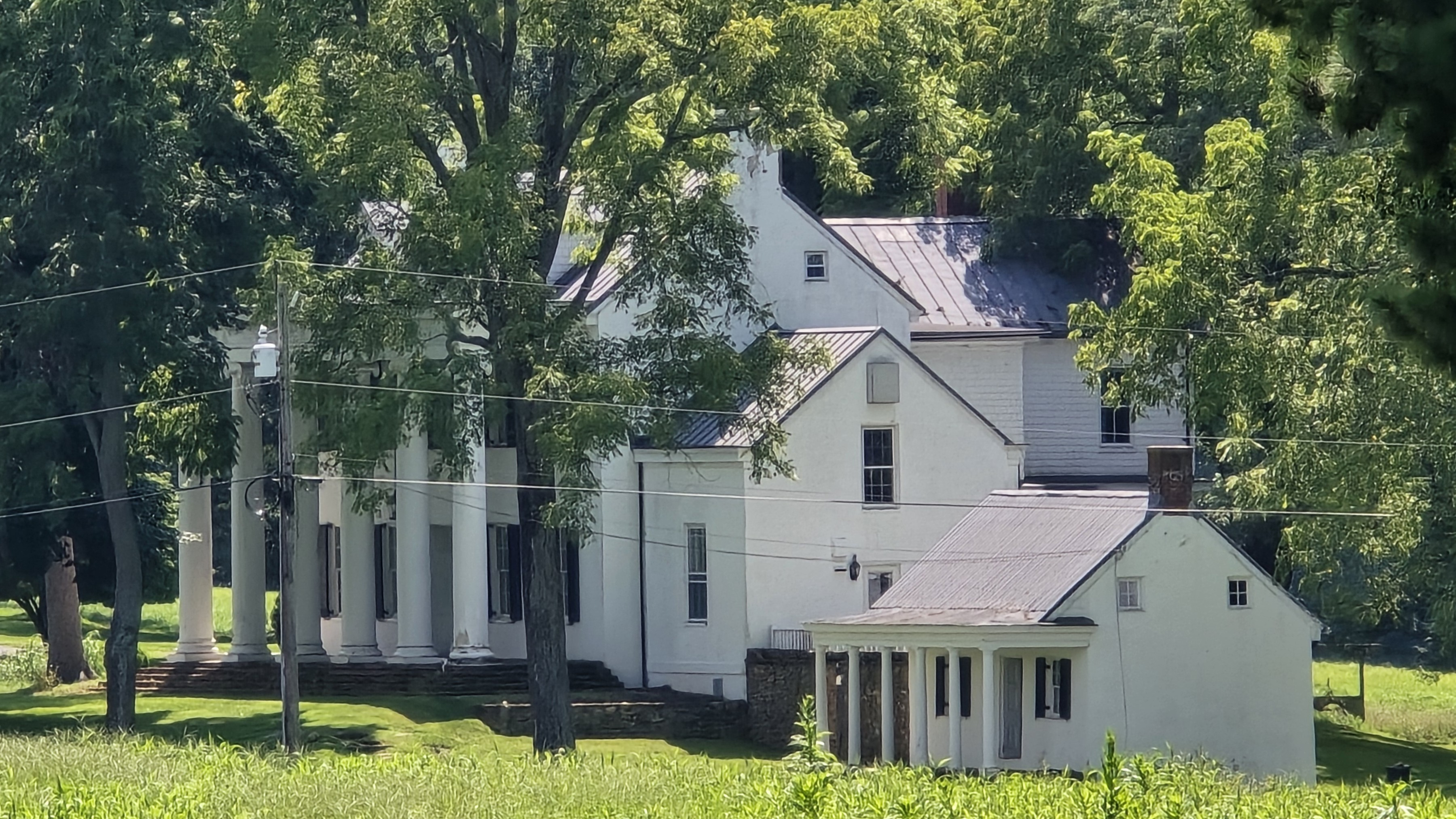

- Location within Maryland
- Interactive map of Longwood
- 39°17′00″N 77°02′00″W
- Location: 3188 Roxbury Mills Road; Glenwood, Maryland 21738

History
- Built: c. 1780
- Built for: Dr. Charles Alexander Warfield

Site notes
- Area: 97.6553 acres
- Architectural style: Georgian
- Current use: Agriculture
- Owner: Howard County, Maryland

Longwood Plantation was a slave plantation in Glenwood in Howard County, Maryland, United States.

== History ==
The Longwood plantation was started by Dr. Gustavus Warfield (1784–1866), son of Dr. Charles Alexander Warfield, a doctor and wealthy landowner in Howard County, where he owned an estate called Bushy Park. Gustavus graduated in 1806 from the University of Pennsylvania and returned to Howard County to practice medicine with his father. The elder Warfield died intestate in 1813, and Gustavus eventually took possession of part of his father's estate.

In the 1820s, he built a manor house, part of which stands today. The name Longwood originates with the Longwood House where Napoleon was exiled in Saint Helena, rather than the typical practice of naming estates after land patents which would have included "Ridgley's Range" or "Ridgley's Great Park". Warfield practiced medicine and ran his slave plantation in the house; he would keep patients in a loft above his office if they were unfit to travel. It feature numerous outbuildings and a smokehouse.

The Warfields built a graveyard for the people they enslaved; it sits to the south of the house. In 1860, Robert E. Lee visited Longwood to visit his wife's first cousin, George Washington Parke Custis Peter. He returned to visit in July 1870.

A will made out in 1865 by Warfield's wife, Mary Thomas Warfield, bequeathes various parts of the property and the people she enslaved to her daughters.

== Development plans ==
In April 2024, Howard County officials announced plans to open the county's first destination public garden at Longwood. The garden will be overseen by the county's Department of Recreation & Parks and a new Public Garden Focus Group. In November 2024, the county completed its purchase of the property. That same month, the focus group finalized its recommendations, which were released by the county two months later. They recommended that the garden include a "living tribute" to the people enslaved on the plantation in the form of "heritage crops and herbs" they used: "okra, peanuts, collard greens, sage, mint and thyme."

== See also ==
- List of Howard County properties in the Maryland Historical Trust
- Ellerslie (Glenwood, Maryland)
