= Patuxent Iron Works =

Ironworks in Maryland, U.S.

Coordinates: 39°04′45″N 76°47′50″W

The Patuxent Iron Works was an ironworks along the Patuxent River in Maryland, United States.

== History ==
Some sources that say the company was founded before 1734 by Richard Snowden and family on the site of their family's earlier iron works. Yet another source says that Snowden, Joseph Cowman, and three other partners founded the Patuxent Iron Work Company in 1736. In truth, the Patuxent Iron Works was originally started much earlier, in 1705, by Snowden and Cowman and three other partners: Edmund Jenings, John Galloway and John Prichard.

When Joseph Cowman and Edmund Jennings later sold their shares of the enterprise to Snowden in 1748 and 1749 respectively, each for the sum of "Four Hundred and five Pounds Sterling," both indentures, dated March 18, 1748, and March 27, 1749, referred to the original Articles of Agreement, dated July 5, 1705, that created the company:

"Whereas by certain Articles of Agreement bearing Date the fifth Day of July seventeen Hundred and five made between the said Richard Snowden the said Joseph Cowman a certain Edmund Jenings John Galloway and John Prichard They the said Richard Snowden Joseph Cowman Edmund Jenings John Galloway and John Prichard did enter into several Covenants and Clauses of Agreement with each other for the Carrying on an Iron Work or Works the Business of a Furnace and Forge then and now Erected on the Head and Branches of Patuxent River."

A 1753 letter by Charles Carroll of Annapolis noted that Snowden's forge was the only one in Maryland to have ore near navigable waters (i.e. the Patuxent River).

According to tax records, the company had on average 45 enslaved workers from 1760 to 1780, who worked as foreman, founders, laborers and blacksmiths. Though both the Snowdens and Cowmans were wealthy Quakers whose children intermarried, they owned slaves for a century.

After Richard Snowden Jr.'s death in 1763, the iron works went to John, Thomas, and Samuel Snowden.

"In 1831 the furnace and forge were sold by Thomas, Richard and Edward Snowden to Evan T. Ellicott and Company, who erected another furnace, 28 feet high and 8 feet wide at the boshes, and a puddling furnace and roughing mills or converting pig iron into bars for the Avalon works above Relay." (The site of the Avalon Works is located in today's Patapsco Valley State Park).

The works were "dismantled and demolished" in 1856, "under the ownership of William Wilkins Glen, John Glenn, Jr., and Robert Lemmon." The ruins were visible a long time afterward.
