= Carr's Mill Landfill =

Landfill in Howard County, Maryland, US

Coordinates: 39.318426°N 77.053589°W

The Carr's Mill Landfill (JTC Carrs Mill Landfill) is a controversial landfill in Howard County, Maryland in the United States. Its official address is 15900 Carrs Mill Road in Lisbon, Maryland.

Carr's Mill is the second official landfill built in Howard County which operated from 1953 to 1977. Howard County's first landfill was New Cut in Ellicott City, Maryland which operated from 1944 to 1980. Alpha Ridge Landfill operated between 1980 and 1997 before the county switched to offsite waste disposal.

== "Bushy Park" and "Carrs Mill" ==
The namesake millhouse was situated on the northern portion of an estate, near the intersection of modern Bushy Park Road and Carrs Mill Road. Carr's Mill is part of the original estate of Charles Alexander Warfield. Warfield married Elizebeth Ridgley of Laurel in 1771 and settled in a log home at "Bushy Park" in Glenwood, Maryland. The same year he started construction on his slave plantation manor home. The property later was owned by the "Hammond" family of the Major Charles Family line. The manor stood for over 150 years, burning in 1933 and demolished in 1947. A new house was built over the original foundation. In 1978 the property was purchased by the Clevenger family and had been subdivided down to 342 acres, but was still actively farmed. In 1983 it had been subdivided down to a 190-acre parcel named "Bushy Park Farm" and sold again. A portion of the original estate became the Carr's mill landfill. Warfield is buried at Bushy Park. The walled cemetery remains, but the majority of the 1300 acre farm has been redeveloped as the Western Regional Park, operated by Howard County.

== Environmental ==
Both Carr's Mill and New Cut landfill were reaching capacity in the early 1970s. With the approval and construction of the Rouse Company development Columbia, the population of the county would quadruple while the landfill was in operation. County executive Edward L. Cochran was already starting the controversial process of selection of a new site, when Carr's Mill became a site of hazardous waste dumping by Western Electric in 1976. Howard County spent millions of dollars to cap the landfill and dispose of hazardous materials after contamination of groundwater on the site. In July 1976, an anonymous tip stated that Francis "sonny" Bohager was bribed $250 from F.P.R Bohager & Sons Inc of Fells Point to allow hazardous waste onsite. Police intercepted two Bohager trucks dumping 101 barrels hazardous materials from Farboil Paint Co. on Key Highway and Western Electric Company by the service road of Carr's Mill. Western Electric had contracted the company to haul 2,700 barrels of hazardous waste in 1976. In July 1976, police reported barrels of hazardous waste were reported to be found buried at the landfill, but were not investigated further. In December, a task force selecting new landfill sites offered Carrs Mill as a site for landfill consolidation for Western Howard County before shipment out of county which was only implemented at the historic Trinity Church property in Elkridge. Carrs Mill ceased operations in 1977.

In 1991, contaminants were discovered in test wells at the landfill site. In 1993, 900 drums of waste were found at the same location where the uninvestigated barrels were reported. 30 more were found in September in an overgrown area feeding into the Cattail creek by Geo-Trans, who was performing a $7.8 million contamination investigation at all three landfill sites. Metal detector tests found 100 more drums within 100 ft. John J. O'Hara, chief of the Howard County Bureau of Environmental Services announced to the press there was no way of finding who dumped the toxic waste, despite a police report, markings on the barrels, and a County effort to fine the companies. Ground water tests revealed Trichloroethylene and a form of dichlorothene level far higher than EPA limits. In 1994, the county held an evening meeting announced that day in the Baltimore Sun, to inform residents about the 840 drums found so far by posting a copy of the report in the Public works Building in Ellicott City. A $2.4 million mitigation plan removed 4,000 tons of soil, capped 8 acres of the landfill trenches, and drilled 14 pumping wells to clean ground water around the site. In 1997, Waste Management of Maryland (purchaser of F.P.R Bohager and Sons), The Beatrice Company (purchaser of Farboil Co), and Lucent Technologies paid $2.85 million toward cleanup of the site without admitting liability.

Altogether, the Carrs Mill Landfill has been cited with seven EPA Clean Water Act Violations. The landfill site has been renamed to Carrs Mill Park, although no amenities exist onsite and few indications are given to the public about its former use,

== See also ==
- Landfills in the United States
- Environment of the United States
- Waste in the United States
