= Richard Snowden (ironmaster) =

Colonial American businessman (1688–1763)

Richard Snowden Ironmaster
- Born: December 28, 1688; Maryland
- Died: January 26, 1763 (aged 75); Maryland
- Resting place: Laurel, Maryland
- Occupation: Iron Producer
- Spouse: Elizabeth Jane Coale (1692–1713) Elizabeth Thomas (1697–1775)
- Children: Deborah, Eliza, Mary, Richard, Thomas, Ann, Margrett, Samuel, Elizabeth, John
- Parent(s): Richard Snowden Jr. (1666–1720), Mary Linthicum (born 1667)

Richard Snowden (1688–1763) was the grandson of Richard Snowden Sr (1640–1711), one of Maryland's early colonists, who arrived in 1658. By Articles of Agreement dated July 5, 1705, Snowden and four other partners – Joseph Cowman, Edmund Jenings, John Galloway, and John Prichard – founded the Patuxent Iron Works on the site of Maryland's oldest iron forge. Together they founded one of Maryland's first industries, and settled the land now known as Laurel and Sandy Spring, Maryland.

== Foundation ==
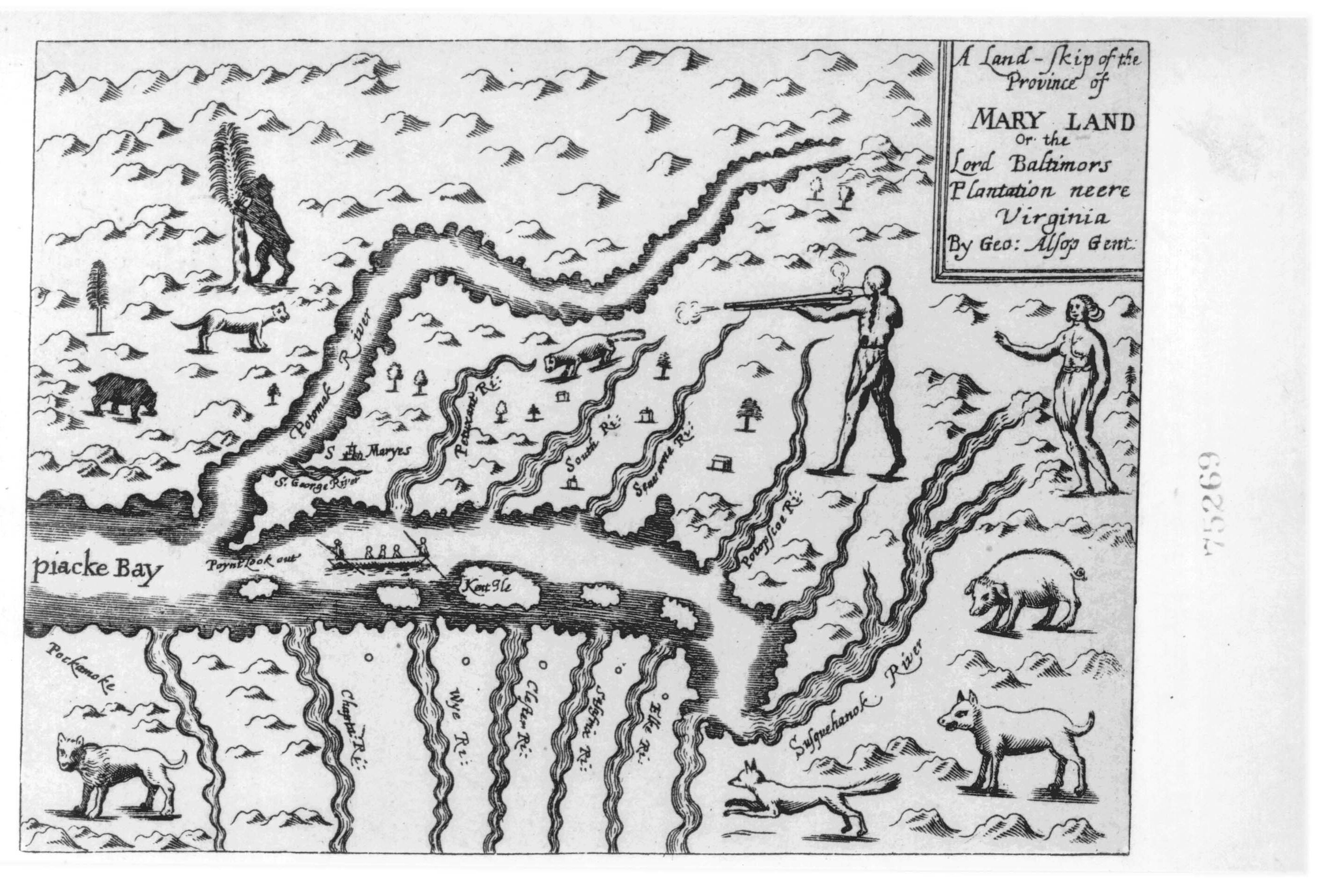
1666 view of Maryland waterways

On the January 11, 1669, 500 acres (2.0 km^{2}) of land called "Iron Mine" were patented from George Yate to Richard Snowden Sr. and Thomas Linthicum, "farmers", for 11,000 lb (5,000 kg) of tobacco. Linthicum sold this land to Snowden Sr. in 1675. In 1685 King Charles (via Lord Baltimore) granted Richard Snowden Sr. 1,976 acres (8.00 km^{2}) of land on the Patuxent River (Robinhood's Forest). On this land, the Quaker Richard Snowden Sr. built the plantation "Birmingham Manor". On August 14, 1688, Snowden Sr. acquired 800 acres (3.2 km^{2}) called Godwell. On April 19, 1715, Snowden Sr. purchased 300 acres (1.2 km^{2}) called "Burgess Choice". On December 10, 1715, 1,000 acres (4.0 km^{2}) of land known as "Snowden's Manor" were surveyed for Snowden Sr. near Ashton. Altogether, Richard Snowden Sr. amassed an estate worth over 2,000 pounds by 1715.

In 1719, Richard Snowden Jr. was granted 10,000 acres (40 km^{2}) in Maryland.

== Property ==
Coat of Arms of Richard Snowden

In 1720, Richard Snowden inherited Birmingham Manor and all the accumulated lands of his father, Richard Snowden Jr. In October 1723, Snowden Hill was surveyed and granted to Richard Snowden, including 646 acres (2.61 km^{2}) of land by the Columbia road with the West Point Branch running through it. In 1724, Richard Snowden sent workers to build a log core that became "Greenwood", north of Brookeville, Maryland establishing Sandy Spring's and Montgomery County's oldest surviving residence.

On May 19, 1729, Richard Snowden, Peter Hume, and Daniel Dulaney the Elder advertised as agents for the sale of "two hundred choice slaves" newly arrived in the South River. Snowden's ironworks employed a mixed workforce of indentured servants, convicts, and enslaved Africans.

In 1736, Snowden, Joseph Cowman, and three other partners founded the "Patuxent Iron Work Company", and built a new furnace on the site of their c. 1705 furnace (Maryland's first ironworks.) A 1753 letter by Charles Carroll of Annapolis noted that Snowden's forge was the only one in Maryland to have ore near navigable waters (i.e. the Patuxent River). In 1737 Snowden partnered with his son-in-law James Brooke to build a gristmill and biscuit factory on the Hawlings River.

On March 5, 1743, "Snowden's Manor Enlarged" including the original "Snowden's Manor" was resurveyed. This totalled 9,265 acres (3,749 ha). A "Laurel road" (now Sandy Spring Road) was described. In 1748 Snowden sold 1,029 acres (4.16 km^{2}) of land called "Snowdens Fourth Addition" to his son-in-law and daughter, Samuel and Mary Thomas in Colesville. Samuel was a Quaker minister and founder of the Sandy Spring meeting of friends. In 1752, he sold 507 acres on the South River named "Snowden's Reputation Supported" along with 265 acres along Elkridge, and 236 acres of "Gander's Delight" in Montgomery County.

Snowden died at his home on January 26, 1763. His obituary may be found in the January 27, 1763 Maryland Gazette.

At Richard Snowden's death, his estate included Snowden Hall, Fairland, Montpelier, Oaklands, Snow Hill, Avondale, Woodland Hill, Alnick, Elmwood, Brightwood, Maple Grove, and most of the land that comprises modern Laurel, Maryland.

== Legacy ==
Richard Snowden is buried in the family cemetery on the grounds of the former Birmingham Manor. The Snowden family cemetery sits just to the east of the former Suburban Airport, and was in its traffic pattern.

After Snowden's death, from the 1760s to the 1780s the ironworks were managed by his sons, Samuel, John and Thomas Snowden. At its peak, Snowden's ironworks produced an annual output of 1200 tons. The owners dismantled the furnace in 1856 due to a lack of wood and ore.
