= Bushy Park (Glenwood, Maryland) =

- Location within Maryland Location within the United States
- 39°18′03″N 77°01′20″W
- Location: Glenwood, Maryland

History
- Built: 1771

Site notes
- Governing body: Private

Bushy Park is a historic slave plantation located at Glenwood, Howard County, Maryland, United States. It is located on a 3,940-acre land patent named "Ridgley's Great Park".

Bushy Park is known as the home of Charles Alexander Warfield. Warfield married Elizabeth Ridgley of Laurel in 1771 and settled in a log home at "Bushy Park". The same year he started construction on his slave plantation manor home. On 19 October 1774, Warfield and his neighbors travelled to Annapolis and burned the Peggy Stewart in retaliation to sanctions on Americans following the Boston Tea Party. Paintings of the incident are displayed in the State House at Annapolis and the Court House at Baltimore.

In 1866, Charles D. Warfeild sold the 270-acre and 160-acre Bushy Park tracts containing an eight-room stone and frame house, including two tenant houses, blacksmith shop, 250-tree apple orchard and 73-tree peach orchard. The property later was owned by the "Hammond" family of the Major Charles family line. The manor stood for over 150 years, burned in 1933, and was demolished in 1947. A new house was built over the original foundation. In 1978, the property was purchased by the Clevenger family and had been subdivided down to 342 acres, but was still actively farmed. In 1983, it had been subdivided down to a 190-acre parcel named "Bushy Park Farm" and sold again. A portion of the original estate became the Carr's Mill Landfill, which became a site of hazardous waste dumping by Western Electric in the 1970s. Howard County spent millions of dollars to cap the landfill and dispose of hazardous materials after contamination of groundwater on the site. Warfield is buried at Bushy Park. The walled cemetery remains, but the majority of the 1300-acre farm has been redeveloped as the Western Regional Park, operated by Howard County.

== See also ==
- Carr's Mill Landfill
