= Glenelg High School =

Public high school in Glenelg, Maryland, U.S.

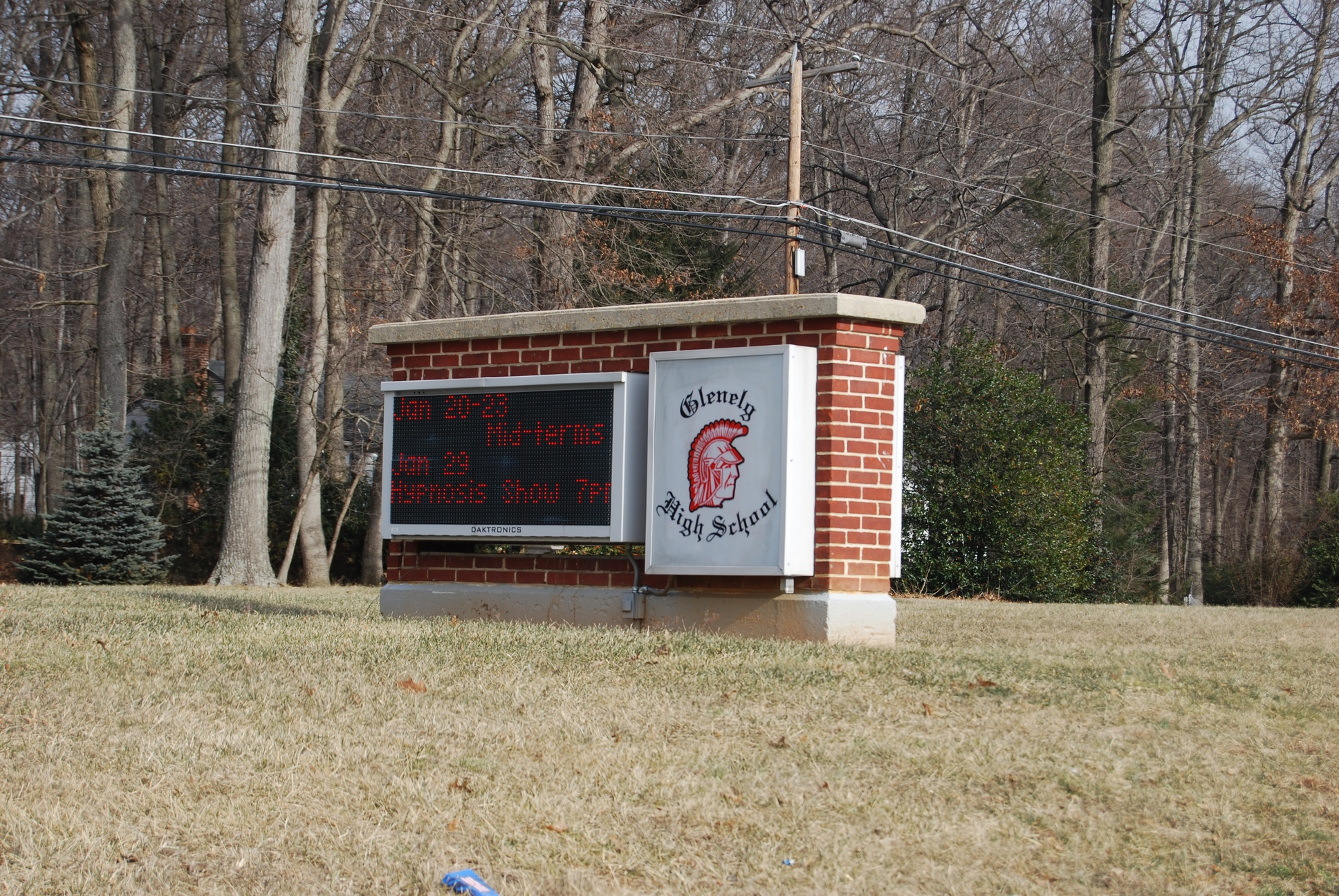
- Image of board located outside of school

Location
- 14025 Burntwoods Road; Glenelg, Maryland 21737; United States; 39.2752°N 77.0020°W

Information
- Type: Public high school
- Opened: 1958
- School district: Howard County Public Schools
- Superintendent: William J. Barnes
- Principal: Nick Novak
- Grades: 9–12
- Hours in school day: 7
- Campus: Rural
- Campus size: 22.78 acres (92,200 m^{2})
- Colours: Red and black (White and grey are unofficial colors and not technically school colors.)
- Mascot: Gladiators
- Nickname: Big Red
- Team name: Gladiators; girls' teams are known as Lady Glads
- Rival: River Hill High School; Marriotts Ridge High School; Howard High School
- Newspaper: The Shield
- Yearbook: The Palindrome
- Feeder schools: Glenwood Middle School, Folly Quarter Middle School
- Website: Glenelg High School website

Glenelg High School is a public high school in Glenelg, Maryland, United States. Glenelg HS is located in the western portion of Howard County, Maryland and is part of the Howard County Public School System, which is among the highest-ranked in the nation.

The school is located just west of Maryland Route 32, south of Interstate 70, and east of Maryland Route 97.

== History ==
As the second continuously-operated high school in Howard County (after Howard High School), Glenelg opened its doors in 1958. The school is named for Glenelg, a postal village named after Glenelg Manor, which in turn was named after the town of Glenelg, Scotland.

The 22.79 acres of land for Glenelg was purchased from the Musgroves in 1955 for $9,117.40. Glenelg opened as Howard County public schools were converting in a phased-in approach from segregated schools to integrated, one grade per year. A 1965 cross burning onsite was an indication of the strained race relations of the era.

The building itself has gone through many changes over the years to cope with the growing population of the west side of Howard County, including a new drama/music wing, and most recently with the construction of a new science wing and an addition to the cafeteria.

== Students ==
Glenelg student body enrollment through the years has fluctuated due to many factors, including new housing construction and redistricting. The demographics show mostly white youth.

Enrollment
2014	2015	2016	2017	2018	2019	2020	2021
1,274	1,261	1,248	1,205	1,173	1,198	1,197	1,263

== Academics ==
In 2021, Glenelg was ranked as the 400th best high school in the nation, 9th best in Maryland, and 2nd best in Howard County, by U.S. News & World Report.

== Athletics ==
Glenelg has won the following state championships:

=== Baseball ===
First Howard County team to ever win State in baseball

- 1983, 1993, 1995, 1998, 1999, 2022

=== Basketball ===
- Girls: 1999, 2001, 2016

=== Field Hockey ===
- 2010, 2011, 2012, 2017, 2021, 2022, 2023, 2025

=== Cross Country ===
- Boys: 1983, 1991, 2001, 2002, 2007
- Girls: 1990, 2003

=== Golf ===
Added as a sport in 2005

- 2006

=== Ice Hockey ===
Club team

- 2010

=== Indoor Track ===
- Boys: 1990, 1991, 1992, 2005
- Girls: 1993, 1999

=== Lacrosse ===
- Boys: 2007, 2008, 2011, 2019, 2024
- Girls: 2005, 2008, 2016, 2017, 2018, 2024

=== Soccer ===
- Boys: 1992, 1997, 2022, 2025
- Girls: 1997, 1999, 2000, 2006, 2007, 2008, 2021

=== Tennis ===
- Boys: 1972, 1987

=== Track and Field ===
- Girls: 1993, 2002

=== Volleyball ===
- 1993, 1995, 2002, 2005, 20212025

=== Wrestling ===
- 2008, 2011

== Extracurricular activities ==
Glenelg's FIRST Robotics Competition Team 888 came in first in 2002 at the Western Michigan Regional and 2022 at the Chesapeake Greater DC regional event

== Notable alumni ==
- David H. Berger, 38th Commandant US Marine Corps
- Caroline Bowman, Singer and actress
- Barbara Gleim, politician
- Brian Johnston, New York Giants Super Bowl champion
- Omar J. "Jamie" Jones IV, US Army general
- Warren E. Miller, Maryland State Delegate
- Margo Seibert, actress
- Greg Smith, retired major league baseball player

== Image gallery ==
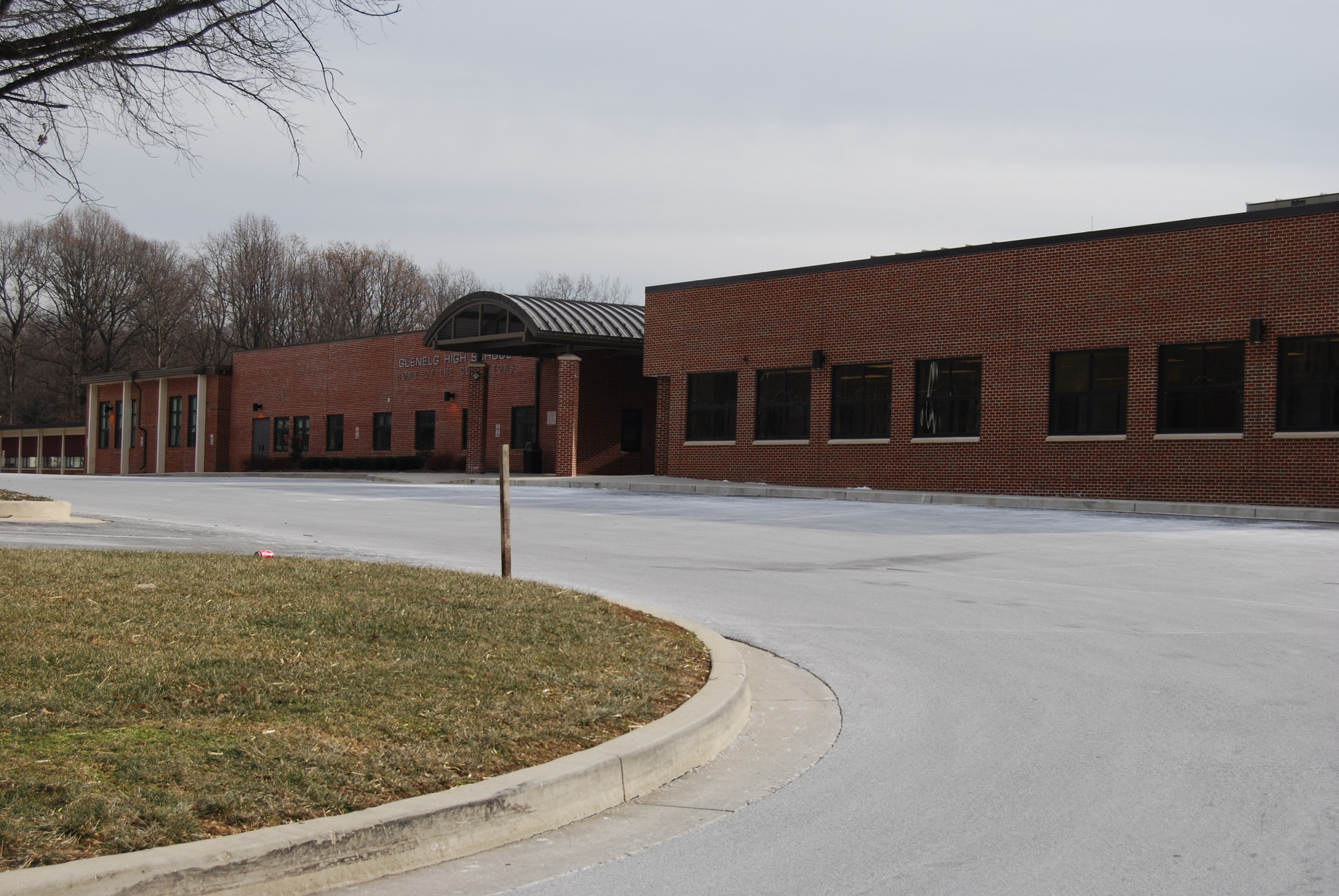
Glenelg High School

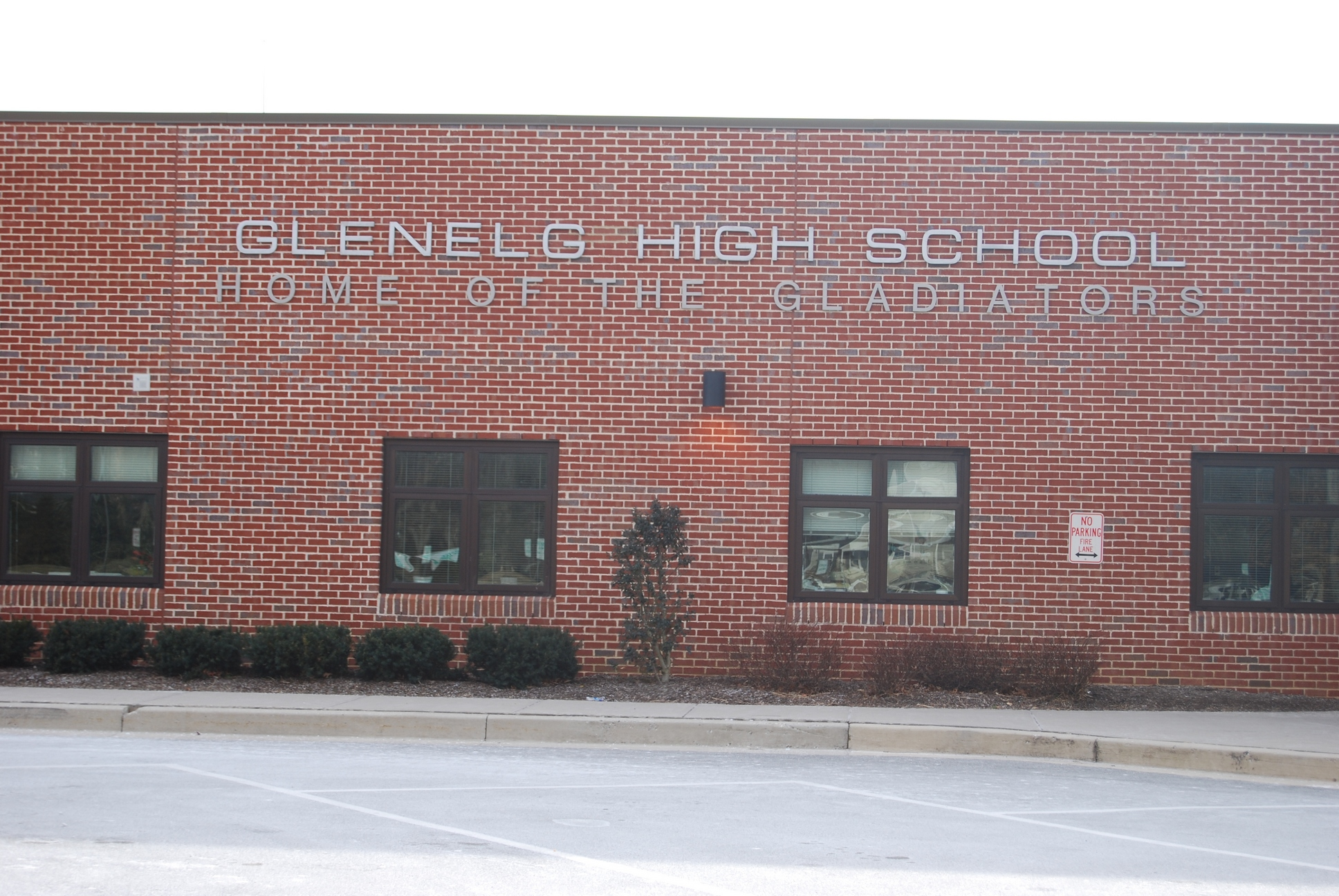
Glenelg High School

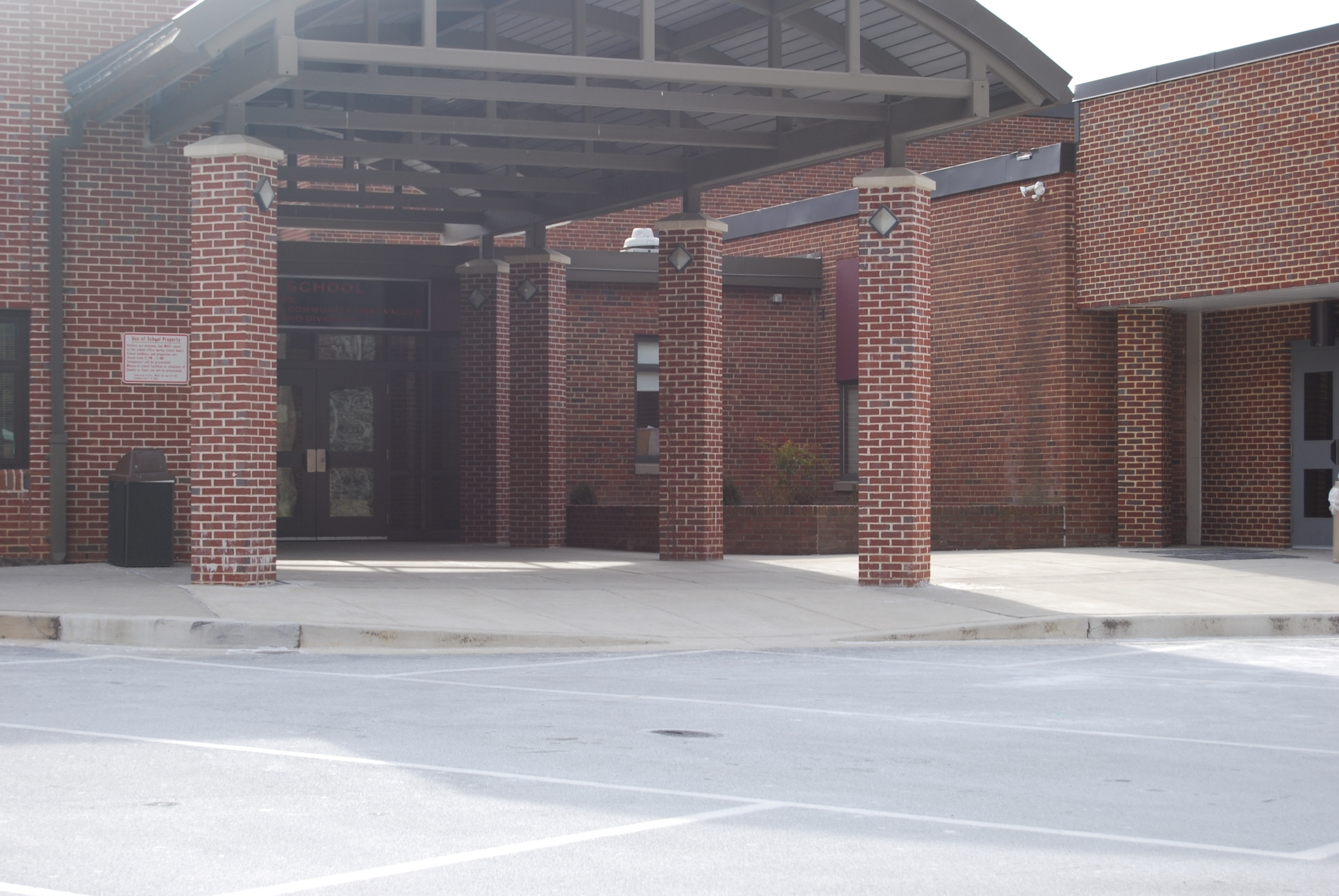
Glenelg High School

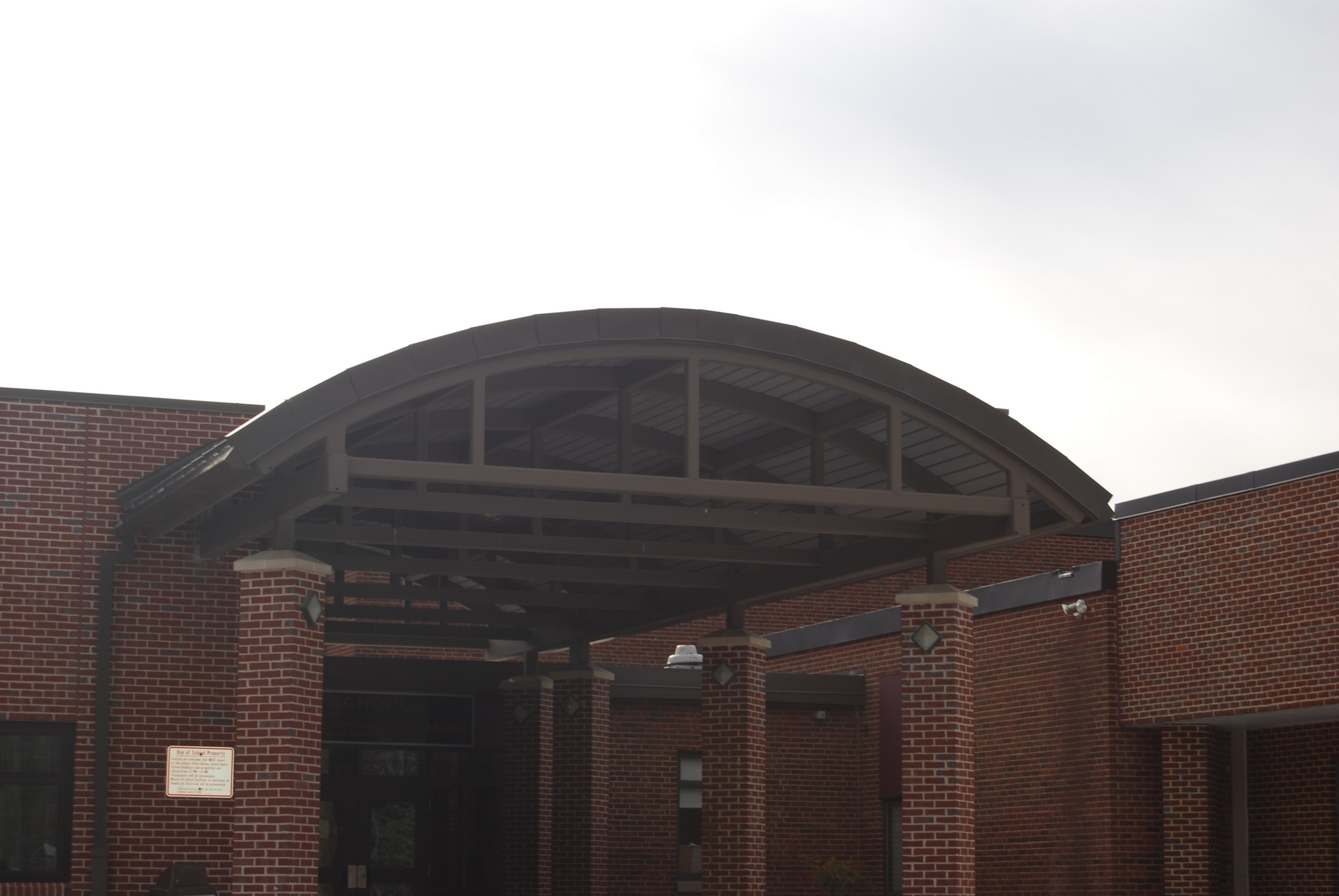
Glenelg High School

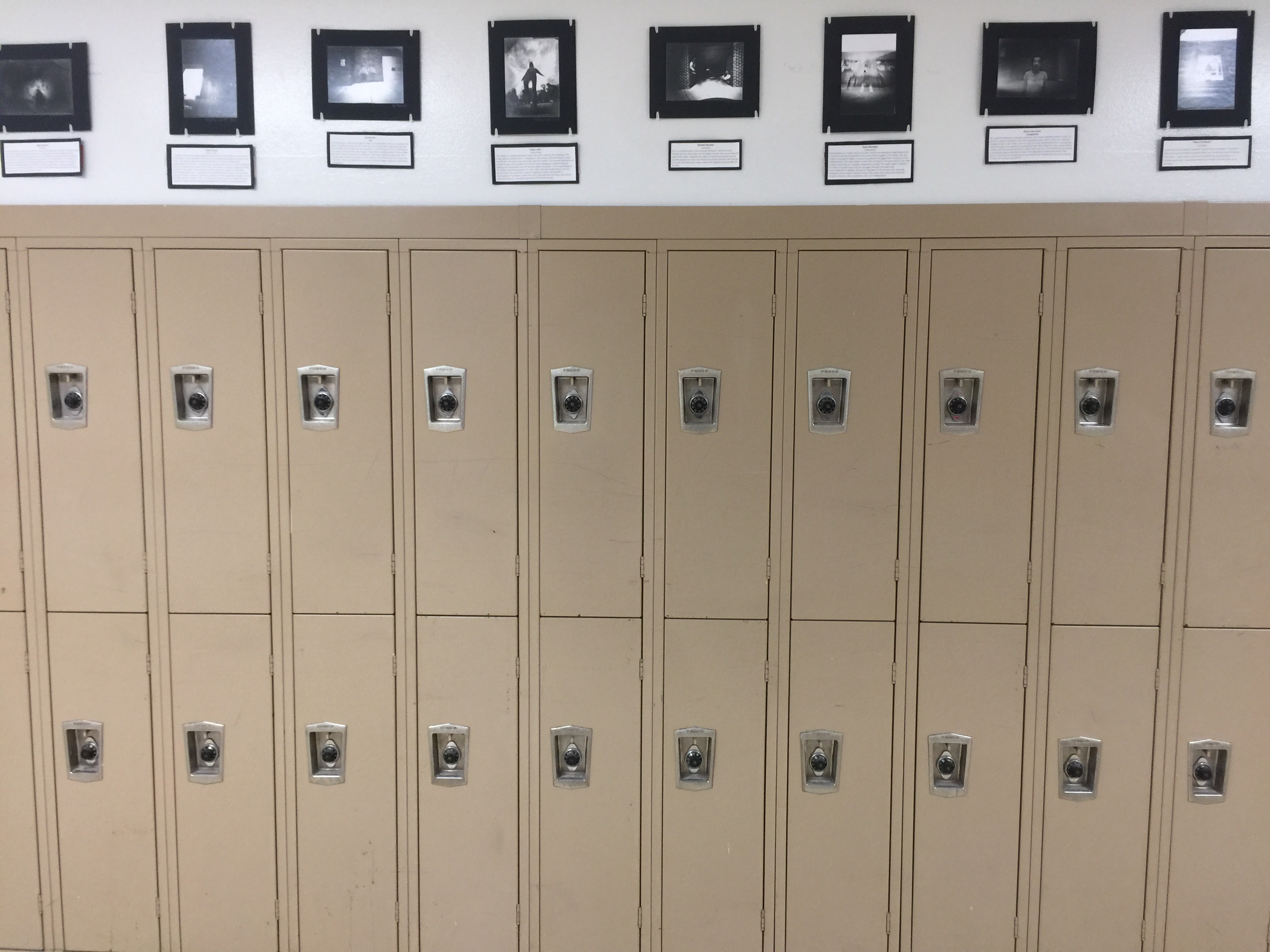

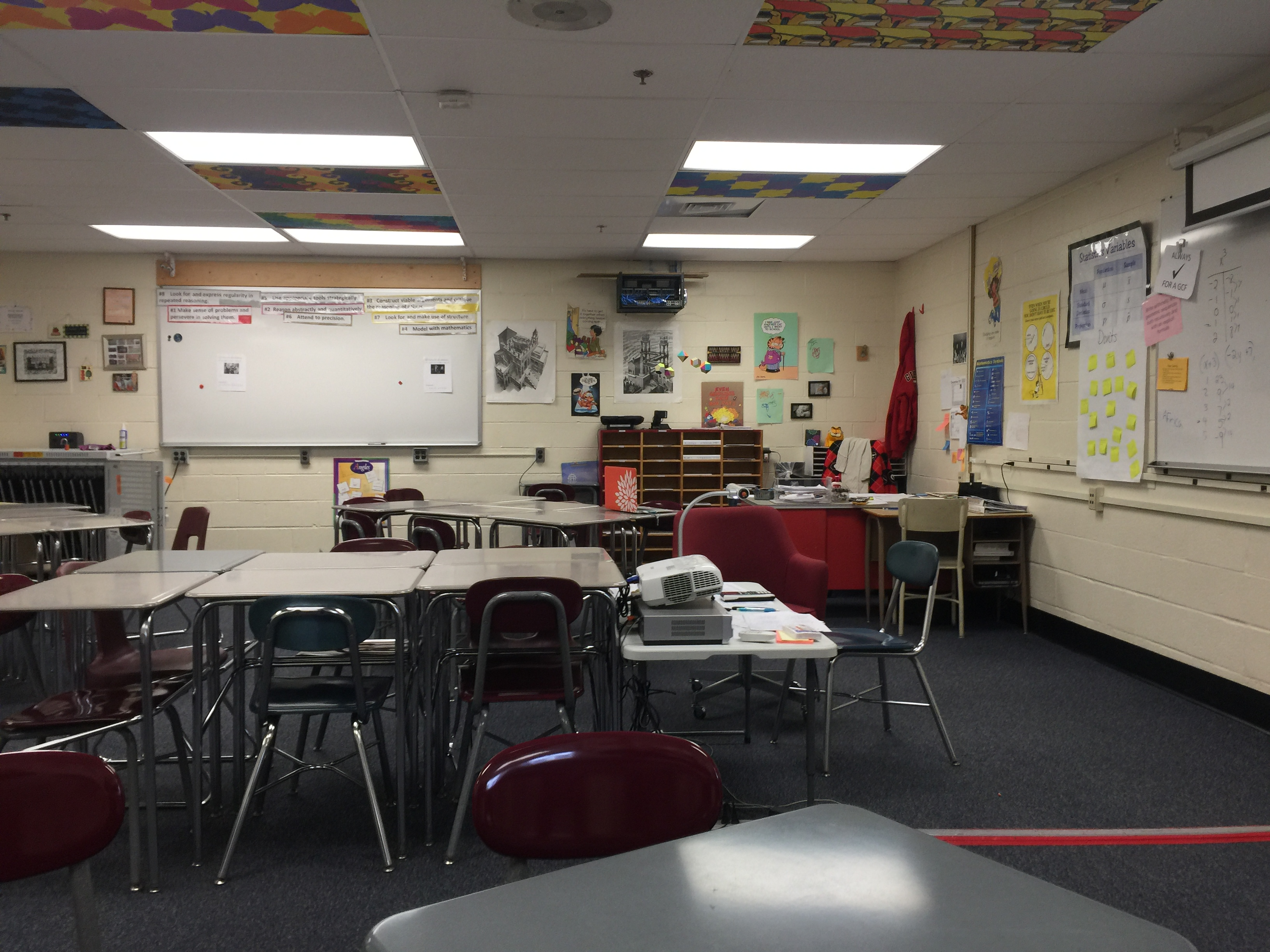

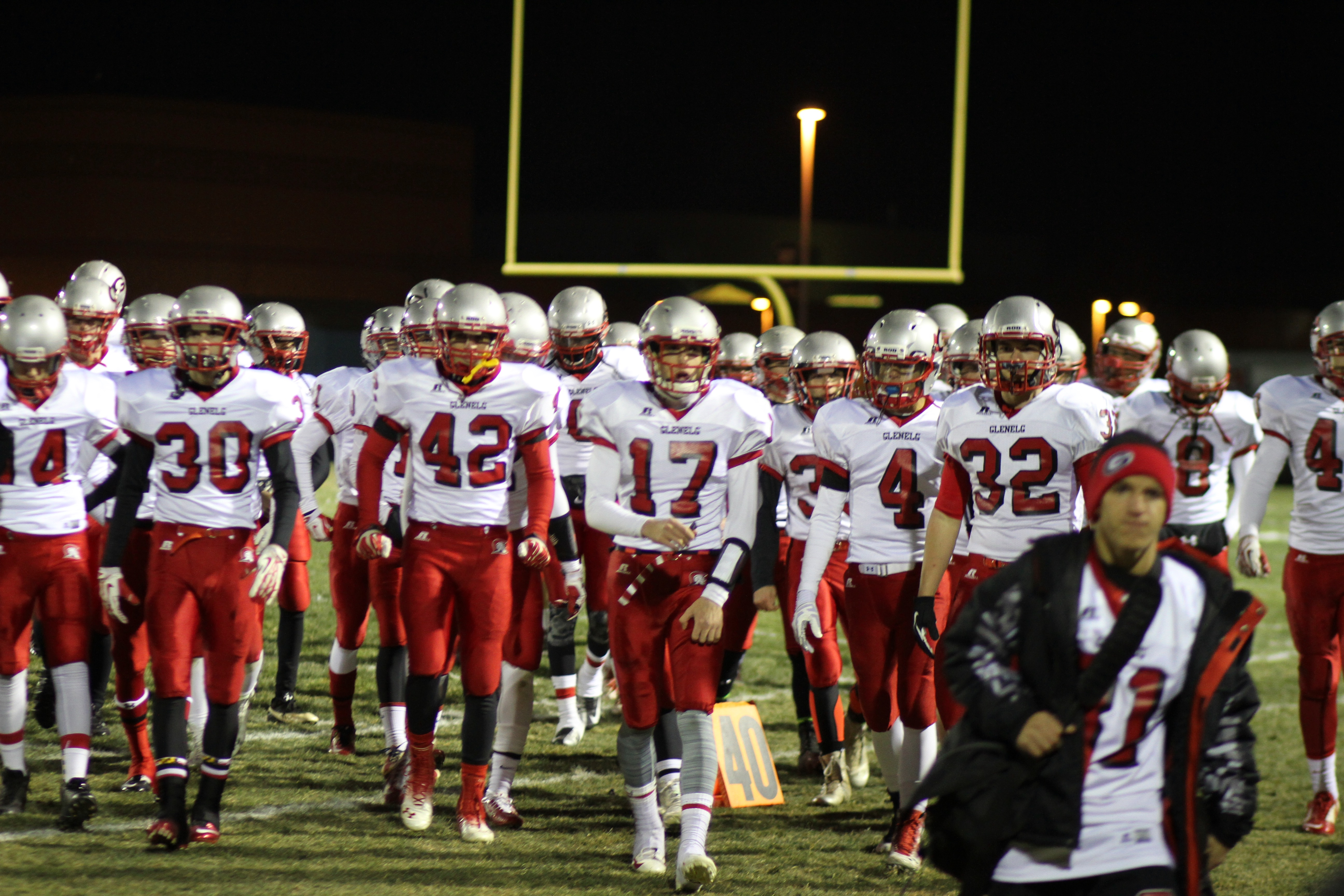
2014 football team

== Controversy ==
On May 24, 2018, Glenelg High School property was defaced with racially-charged hate speech. The perpetrators spray-painted school property with swastikas and other racially-charged epithets.

== References and notes ==
- Newsweek
