= Paternal Gift Farm, Maryland =

Community in Howard County, Maryland, US

Coordinates: 39°10′32″N 76°57′26″W

Paternal Gift Farm is a historic farm converted to an unincorporated community located in Howard County, Maryland, United States in the Highland, Maryland ZIP code of 20777. The Paternal Gift Farm, Inc is its homeowners' association, and all homeowners are members.

In 1803, Dr. Charles Alexander Warfield patented 510 acres under the name "Paternal Gift" to his son Gustavius. A colonial farmhouse was built circa 1860. The land originally belonged to Dr. Charles Alexander Warfield who patented the 510 acres to his son Gustavus Warfield. The Harding family of Howard County held the land until 1937, when Warwick Keegan acquired around 200 acres and the original farmhouse. Keegan modernized the house but died soon after, resulting in the sale of the land to Melvin and Prue Scheidt in 1946. The Scheidt family continued to use the land to farm cattle, horses, sheep, chickens and crops until 1995, at which point the land was developed.

Melvin and Prue Scheidt's daughter-in-law, Susan Scheidt, singlehandedly developed what is now the Paternal Gift Farm neighborhood. She sought to preserve the original farming nature of the property by putting 75% of the land into farmland preservation. That land is used to operate a horse boarding facility featuring seven barns, which funds upkeep of the community property. A series of crimes involving the cutting of horse tails followed on the farm shortly afterward. The original farm is now subdivided and reduced to 3.748 acres.

The Paternal Gift Farm development consists of 30 single family homes—28 new homes, the farm manager's home, and the original developer's home—on approximately 123 acres (0.50 km^{2}). The property rests on the land triangle made between Maryland Route 216 (Highland road), Maryland route 108, and Hall Shop Road.

Paternal Gift Farm is the recipient of several state and national awards. In 1997, the Home Builders Association of Maryland presented Paternal Gift Farm with two awards: "1997 LDC Award of Excellence" for excellence in design, planning and construction of a small single family development, and the "1997 Overall Project of the Year."

Also in 1997, the National Association of Conservation Districts presented Paternal Gift Farm with the "Outstanding Cooperator Award" for the environmentally sensitive way in which the property is subdivided and for dedicated responsible land management.

The community was featured on an episode of Dream Builders in a segment called "Farms of Tomorrow".
