= Peggy Stewart (ship) =

Cargo ship burnt in the "Annapolis Tea Party"

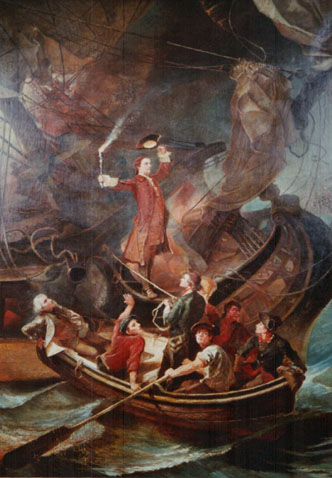
Painting by Francis Blackwell Mayer, 1896, depicting the burning of Peggy Stewart

Peggy Stewart was a Maryland cargo vessel burned on October 19, 1774, in Annapolis as a punishment for contravening the boycott on tea imports which had been imposed in retaliation for the British occupation of Boston following the Boston Tea Party. This event became known as the "Annapolis Tea Party".

== Background ==
In February 1770, the brig Good Intent arrived at Annapolis from London, bringing goods ordered by local merchants during 1769. Some of the orders had been placed before the local resolutions in June–July 1769, to boycott goods subject to British tax under the "Townshend Acts" of 1767. The Customs collector at Annapolis would not allow any goods to be landed, even those not subject to tax, until the tax had been paid. The local committee supervising the boycott would not allow tax to be paid on any goods. Merchants importing the goods, led by James Dick and his son-in-law Anthony Stewart, finally gave up, and sent Good Intent back to London, still fully loaded. Ironically, while Good Intent was in mid-Atlantic, the British government gave in to the boycott and removed taxes on all goods—except tea. The Tea Act of 1773 allowed only one company, the East India Company, to sell tea in the Thirteen Colonies without paying tax, but such a one-sided deal seemed as unjust to American colonists as the original taxes, eventually leading to the Boston Tea Party and, following punitive British policies, to a widespread re-introduction of tea boycotts.

== Ship and cargo ==
Most ships' captains refused to carry tea, but in the summer of 1774, one merchant, Thomas Charles Williams, the London representative of an Annapolis family firm, thought he had found a cunning way around that problem. He loaded 2,320 pounds (about one ton) of tea, in 17 packages, aboard the brig Peggy Stewart, principally owned by Dick and Stewart (business rivals to the Williams firm), which was about to make the Atlantic crossing. The worried captain, Richard Jackson, was told that the packages contained linen, but to avoid the possibility of being prosecuted for smuggling, Williams correctly identified the consignment as tea on his Customs declaration. Hence, when he was clearing Customs at the mouth of the River Thames (some distance from London) Jackson learned that he had been right to suspect the packages and that part of his cargo was going to cause major trouble in America. However, once declared to Customs officials in Britain, the tea had to be taken to its appointed destination — preferably before the autumn gales began, for Peggy Stewart needed an overhaul and leaked quite badly. That made the voyage most unpleasant for the main cargo: 53 indentured servants.

== Arrival in Annapolis ==
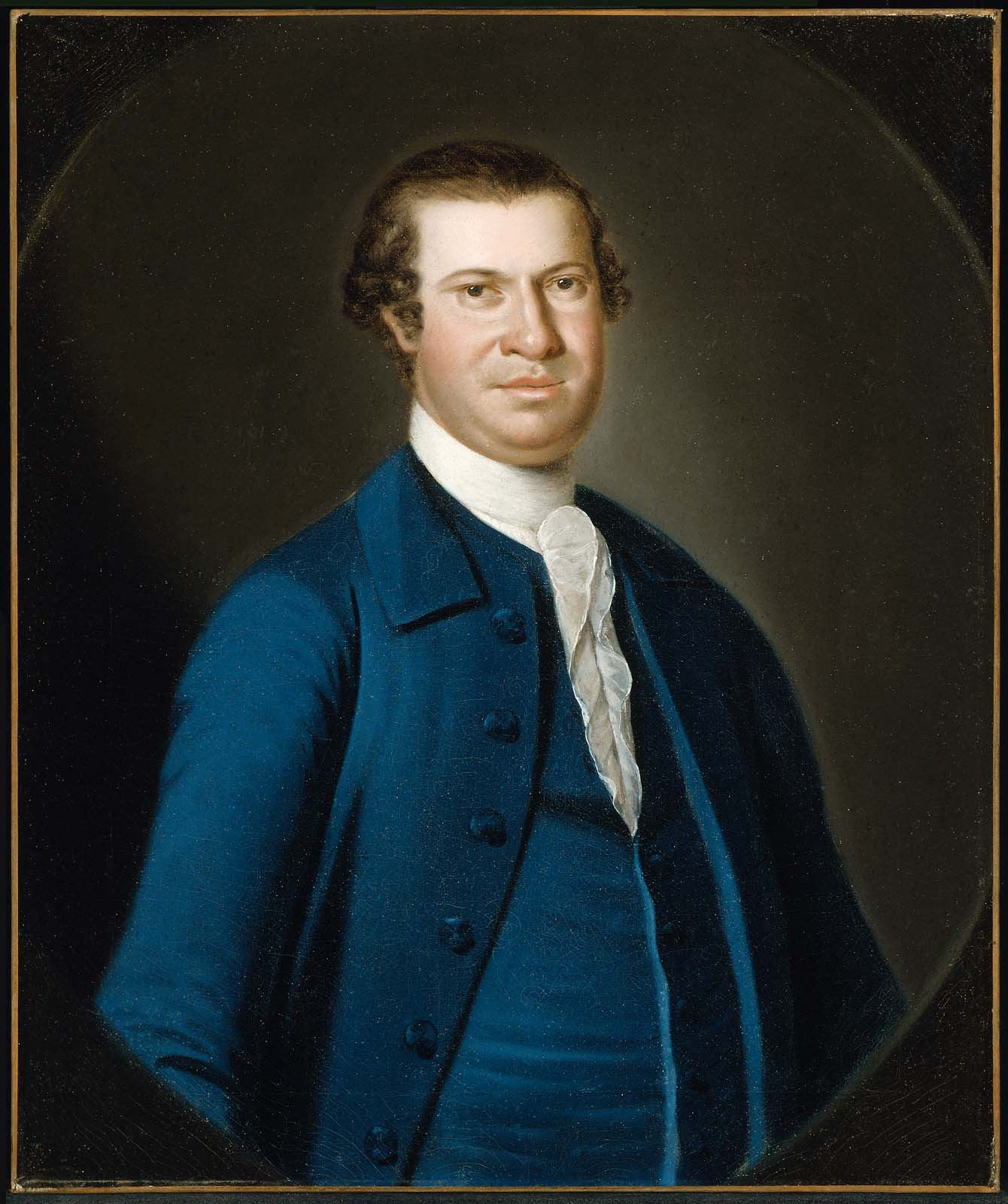
Anthony Stewart, (1728–1791) co-owner of Peggy Stewart, which was named after his daughter

The Peggy Stewart arrived at Annapolis on the morning of 14 October 1774, and Anthony Stewart was notified of the tax payable on one small part of the cargo. He went immediately to Joseph and James Williams, Thomas's brothers and business partners, and informed them of the situation. Whatever Thomas had intended, his brothers had no interest in his mad scheme, so they refused to pay the tax, and arranged a meeting with the committee which supervised the tea boycott, to discuss the problem. Anthony Stewart feared a rerun of the Good Intent case, for none of the cargo could come ashore until the tax had been paid on that tea tucked away in a corner of the hold—not even the indentured servants.

Stewart knew they could not send the entire cargo back to London because it included the 53 indentured servants, who might easily die in the autumn storms. He therefore guaranteed payment of the tax on the tea himself, got the servants ashore as soon as possible, and left the rest of the cargo aboard to await the committee's decision.

== Negotiations ==
Only four of the committee were available for a meeting that afternoon, so they invited the public to contribute to the discussion, and it was decided that all the cargo except the tea could be unloaded, 12 supervisors being appointed by the meeting to ensure that this stipulation was adhered to. A full committee meeting was then arranged for the morning of the following Wednesday, 19 October, and over five days, a great deal of politics occurred. On the one hand, Stewart and the two Williams brothers met with committee chairman Charles Carroll and formulated an agreement that they would burn the tea and publish an apology in the Maryland Gazette. On the other hand, one committee member, Mathias Hammond, published a handbill on 15 October, denouncing Stewart (and omitting to mention that the Williams brothers themselves had been the ones who notified him of the tea importation), and stirred up a great deal of popular fervor. Thus the second committee meeting was thronged with people, many of whom had come specifically to make an example of the wicked Mr Stewart and his cronies.

== The second committee meeting, 19 October ==
The reporting of this affair in the Maryland Gazette was, by modern standards, less than conscientious. No mention was made of the indentured servants, no attempt was made to remind readers of the Good Intent case, and the report of the fateful second meeting was oddly abbreviated:

The committee were of opinion, if the tea was destroyed by the voluntary act of the owners and proper concessions made, that nothing further ought to be required. This their opinion being reported to the assembly, was not satisfactory to all present. Mr Stewart then voluntarily offered to burn the vessel and the tea in her...

A letter to the Baltimore Patriot newspaper immediately after the death of successful physician and businessman Dr Charles Alexander Warfield, in 1813 expands greatly on that short account. Warfield, recently appointed a Major in the new Anne Arundel County militia, had not only argued with moderate patriots like Charles Carroll and Samuel Chase; he had allegedly had a gallows erected outside Stewart's house. Some details of the account seem false, but other sources agree that he led the calls for harsh penalties, whipping up mob hysteria. The Gazette did publish a letter from the Williams brothers in which, among other things, they complained that their complete willingness to co-operate with the committee was "kept entirely secret" from the angry throng, and instead "a most ungenerous piece was drawn up by Mathias Hammond." An anonymous letter to another newspaper (quite probably written by Thomas Williams) claimed that "the minds of the people were so inflamed, that they threatened death to Mr. Stewart, and desolation to his store and dwelling-house."

== Burning of the ship ==
The offer to burn Peggy Stewart was enough to satisfy the mob, so the brig was moved to a convenient spot "with her sails and colours flying", and, after reading out a statement apologising for their conduct (which was subsequently published in the Gazette), Anthony Stewart, Nehemiah Moxley, Joseph Williams and James Williams jointly set the vessel and the tea alight. Within a few hours, "in the presence of a great number of spectators" Peggy Stewart had burned down to the waterline. The event has since become known as the "Annapolis Tea Party".

== The plot claim ==
Thomas Charles Williams, the real cause of the problem, later published an apology for his own actions- but if the anonymous letter really was his work (it was published in the Philadelphia Public Ledger on 4 January 1775, just two days after Thomas signed his apology, also in Philadelphia) he blamed everybody except himself. The letter outlined an alleged plot involving another rival firm, Wallace, Davidson and Johnson- Davidson being Deputy Comptroller of Customs in addition to his business interests. Stewart was the principal victim, partly because he had voted against a proposal (nominally in retaliation against the British government's punishment of the people of Boston) for American lawyers to refuse to handle actions for debts due to persons in Great Britain, partly because Peggy Stewart had taken trade the Wallace firm had lost when a vessel of theirs ran aground in the English Channel. The writer was convinced that the plot would have failed if Stewart had followed Joseph and James's lead- but then, the writer knew nothing about the 53 indentured servants, and claimed instead that Stewart, as an owner of the vessel, was "anxious for dispatch, in order that she might proceed to another port."

== Anthony Stewart's later life ==
Anthony Stewart and his family spent most of the years of the American Revolutionary War living in New York, where he served on the board of directors of the Associated Loyalists; then in 1783 he attempted, with one Samuel Gouldsbury, to found a community called New Edinburgh, in Nova Scotia. Legal obstacles prevented the plan from being fully realised, but the community still exists today. Despite the significant financial loss he sustained in the "Tea Party", Stewart remained wealthy, although the 1,200 acres (4.9 km^{2}) of land he owned in Maryland would be forfeited at the end of the War in 1783. Ironically, he died on a business visit to Annapolis, in 1791.

== Legacy of the burning ==
A commemorative ingot issued in 1875 to honor the Peggy Stewart burning

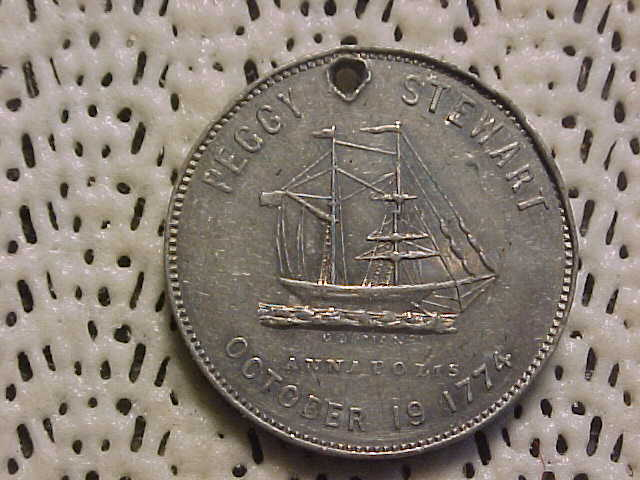
A revolution centennial commemorative medallion showing Peggy Stewart

A token was produced and circulated in 1875 to celebrate the "Peggy Stewart" incident. After the American Revolutionary War, citizens of Maryland came to view the burning of Peggy Stewart as an act of heroism, considering the angry crowd who demanded the burning to be devoted patriots for their resistance of the British Tea Act. On October 19, 1904, the city of Baltimore commemorated the event with The Burning of the Peggy Stewart, a mural by Charles Yardley Turner (1850–1919), painted on the west wall of the Criminal Court Lobby in the Clarence M. Mitchell, Jr. Courthouse. On October 19, 1974, the Bicentennial Council of the 13 Original States created a silver ingot honoring the two-hundredth anniversary of the burning. The incident is also honored by "Peggy Stewart Tea", a blend sold by Eastern Shore Tea Co. The burning is honored each year by a ceremony in Annapolis. The story was recounted in a children's book Ahoy, Peggy Stewart by Maud Esther Dilliard, published by Dutton, 1956.

== Further information ==
- The "patriotic" version of the story (one of many examples), accessed Nov 11 2007
- An essay by a local maritime enthusiast from www.seakayak.ws, accessed Nov 10 2007
- "Annapolis's "Tea Party"". The New York Times. November 19, 1892.
- Fisher, Richard D. (ed.). "The burning of the Peggy Stewart". Maryland Historical Magazine, vol. 5 (1910), pages 235–45.
- Baltimore Court House mural by Charles Yardley Turner, unveiled 1904, accessed Nov 10 2007
