= Suburban Airport =

Former public-use airport in Maryland, U.S.

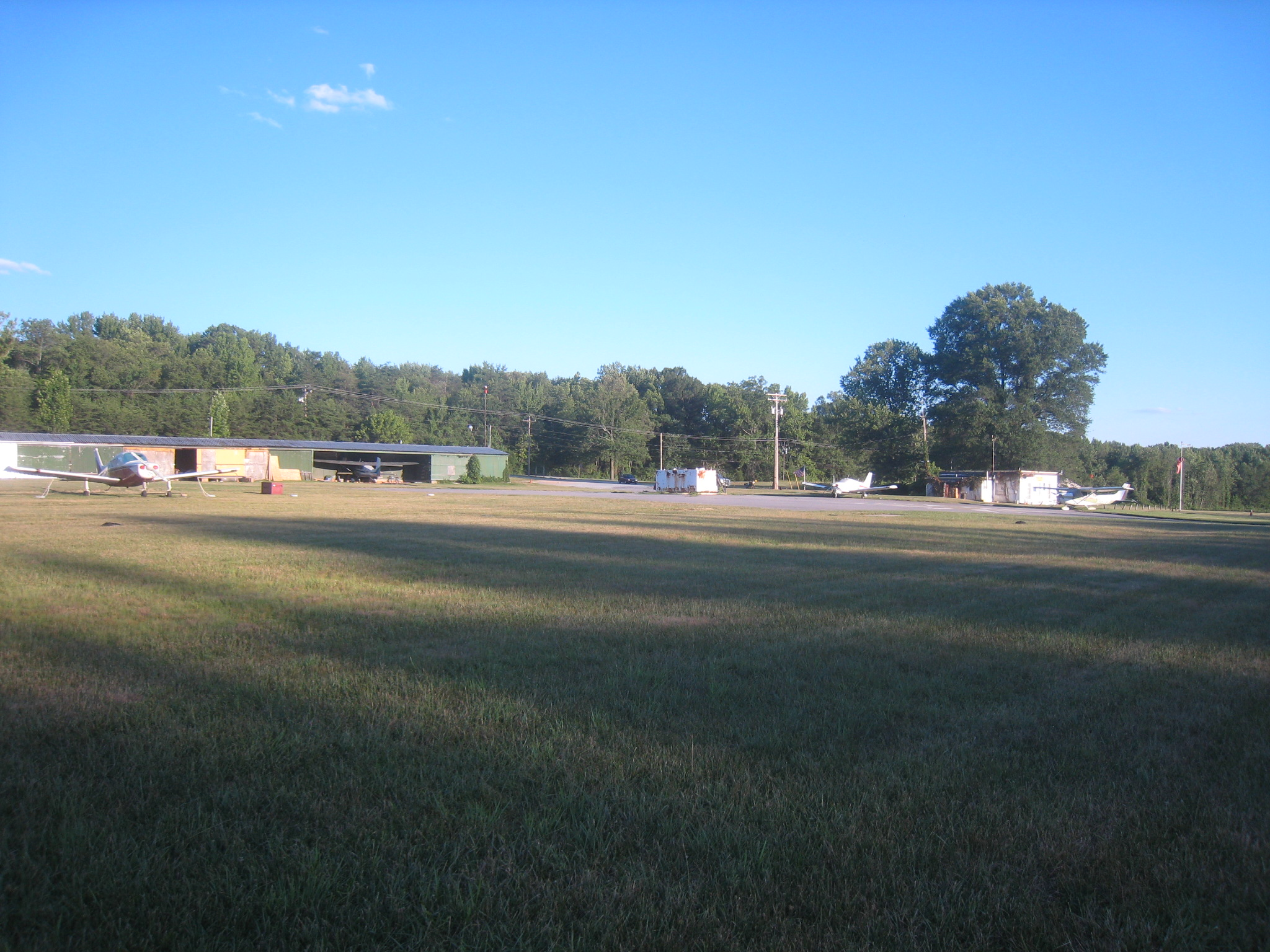
- IATA: none; ICAO: none; FAA LID: W18

Summary
- Airport type: Public
- Owner: Suburban Air Park LLC
- Location: Laurel, Maryland
- Opened: March 1960
- Closed: June 30, 2017
- Elevation AMSL: 148 ft (45 m)
- Coordinates: 39°04′37″N 076°49′41″W

Map
- Location of airport in Maryland W18 (the United States)

Runways
Direction	Length		Surface
Direction	ft	m	Surface
3/21	2,324	708	Asphalt

Statistics (2006)
- Aircraft operations: 1,750
- Based aircraft: 35
- Source: Federal Aviation Administration

Suburban Airport (FAA LID: W18) was a public-use airport located in Anne Arundel County, Maryland, United States, two miles (3 km) southeast of the central business district of Laurel. This airport was privately owned by Suburban Air Park LLC. The airport was closed in 2017.

== Facilities and aircraft ==
Suburban Airport covered an area of 52 acres (21 ha) which contains one paved runway (3/21) measuring 2,324 by 40 feet (708 m × 12 m).

A combination of grass, paved-pad, ramp, owner-maintained fabric hangars, and steel hangars were available for aircraft to base from. The airport hosted homebuilt experimental aircraft, and had been the primary construction site of several aircraft.

== History ==
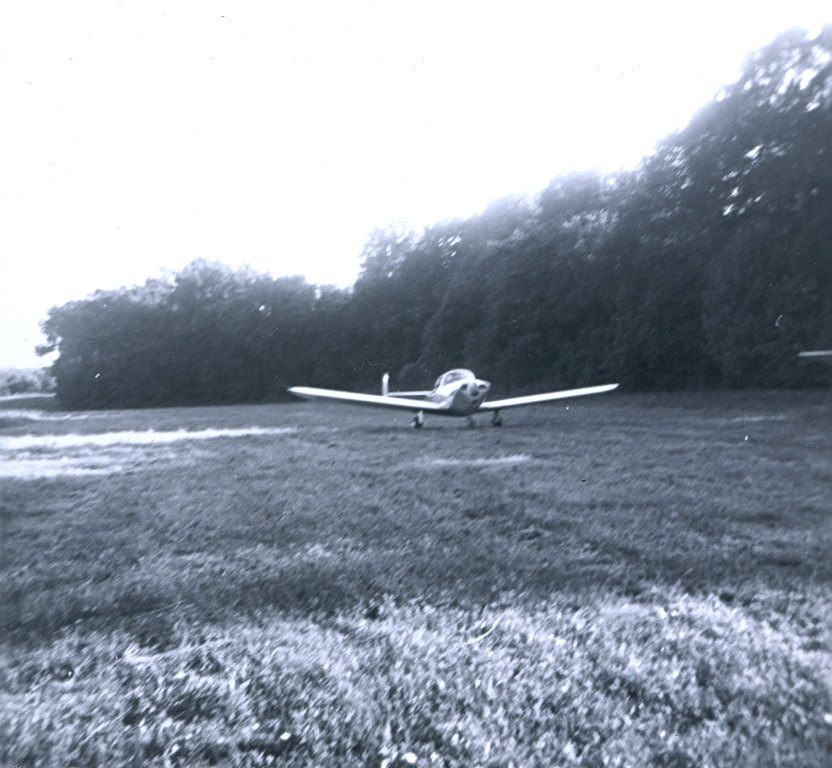
First customer – June 1960. An ERCO Ercoupe taxis to its tiedown at Suburban.

Suburban Airport was on ground once owned by the Snowden Family. The family manor "Birmingham" was built in 1690, and sat adjacent to the runway on what is now the northbound lanes of the Baltimore–Washington Parkway. The Snowden family cemetery sits just to the east of the runway. This historic location was the home of the first Iron production in Maryland, Patuxent Iron Works. Just to the west of the airport is a later Snowden family manor, Montpelier.

Suburban Airport opened in March 1960 as a family-run airport and fixed-base operation. The first manager was Morgan Stern. The first aircraft flown into the field was an Erco Ercoupe. By 1963, the operations building and maintenance hangar were complete and there were 33 aircraft based on the field.

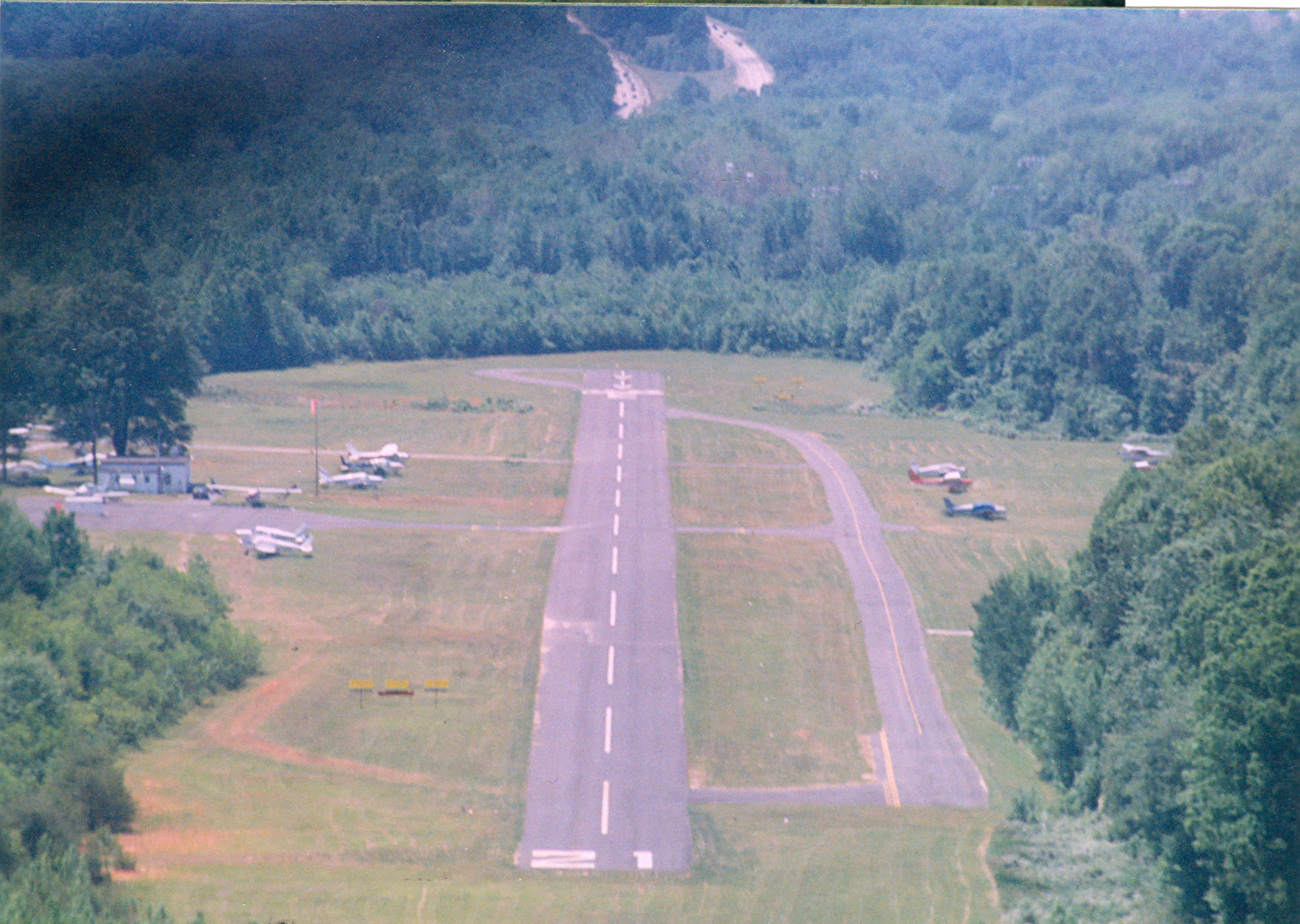
Final approach for 21 – summer of 1998

The airport hosted meetings of the Experimental Aircraft Association and aviation-oriented youth education programs such as Young Eagles flights.

The airport had been a Piper Aircraft dealer.

In 2001, Suburban Airport was closed for operations by the September 11 attacks. Aircraft had limited access to leave, then eventually arrivals and departures were granted under the flight rules of the Washington Air Defense Identification Zone.

Suburban Airport was most recently owned by W18 LLC, an entity co-located with Bay Area Land Development and Polm Housing. The airport property is in a region affected by Base Realignment and Closure and gambling legislation at the nearby Laurel Park Racecourse. In 2004, Polm attempted to increase the zoning of the airport property from 21 allowable housing units to 641 units for a Workforce housing development called Riverwood. Polm publicly announced plans prior to the hearing to expand Suburban Airport to support 300 aircraft, 100 hangars, helicopter charters, and operate a flight school if the increased zoning failed. 250 people attended the zoning hearing where the Riverwood zoning attempt did not pass. The same hearing passed zoning changes for Polm's Fieldstone development on the same road. In 2009, Polm offered to build a 715-seat privately run school if Riverwood zoning was approved.

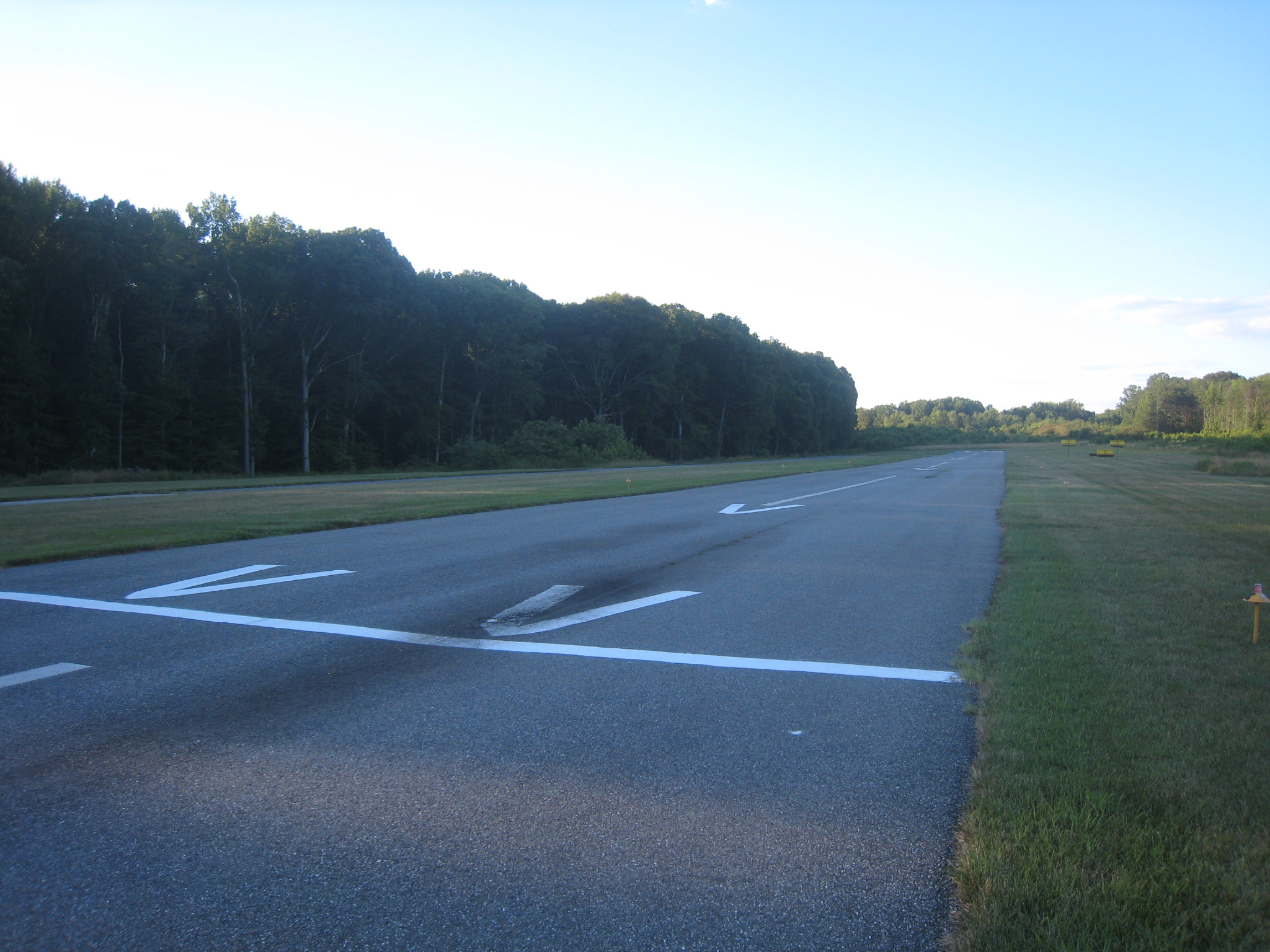
New threshold in foreground, looking toward the old threshold

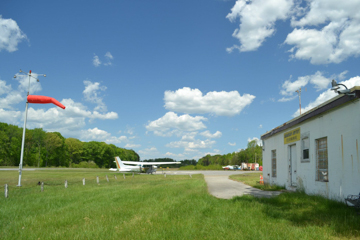
Suburban Airpark

In 2010, the Maryland Aviation Administration changed the criteria for minimum approach angles and marked the airport with new displaced thresholds. The thresholds shortened 1/3 of the runway for landing operations both ways on the 2,300-foot runway. Organizations that provided aircraft for Young Eagles flights had to relocate because the available runway was reduced beyond safe operating limits of their aircraft.

By late 2012, the airport owner had yet to expand hangars and operations as announced in 2004, efforts to bring gambling to nearby Laurel Park had failed, BRAC-related inflow ceased in 2011, declining home prices and interest rates due to the Great Recession greatly reduced the need for workforce housing developments, and the county's school and water demands were beyond capacity from overdevelopment. Suburban Airport's owner submitted plans to build the for-profit Monarch Global Village Academy Public Contract School for troubled children, managed by the Children's Guild, temporarily on the airport property in exchange for approval to build the Riverwood housing development. Anne Arundel County required the school to offset the impact of the proposed Riverwood development and overcrowding from other recently approved developments. After the county announced that it would seek school construction sites elsewhere in 2012, the project was started on a neighboring parcel once occupied by the Laurel Moose lodge and sold to the Children's Guild.
