= Round About Hills =

Historic house in Maryland, United States

- U.S. National Register of Historic Places
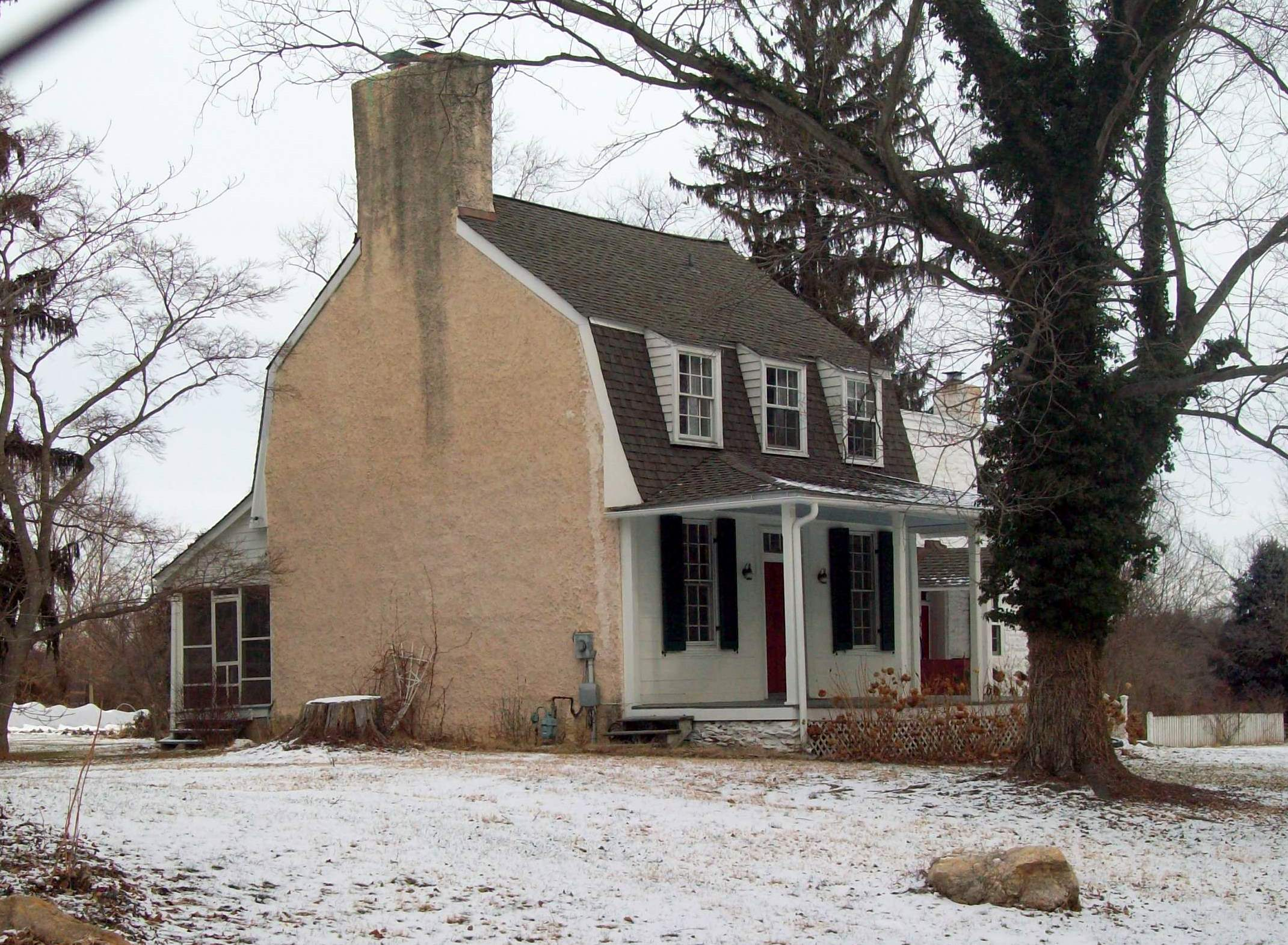
- Round About Hills, January 2011

- Location within Maryland Location within the United States
- Location: 15505 Cattail Oaks, Glenwood, Maryland
- Coordinates: 39°16′24″N 77°01′52″W
- Area: 3.2 acres (1.3 ha)
- Built: 1773
- Architectural style: Southern colonial
- NRHP reference No.: 08001072
- Added to NRHP: November 20, 2008

Round About Hills or Peacefields is a historic slave plantation home located at Glenwood, Howard County, Maryland. An alternate address for this house is 14581 McClintock Drive, Glenwood, Maryland. It was built about 1773 on a 266-acre land patent and consists of a 1 1/2-story frame house with a stone end. Thomas Beale Dorsey inherited the property in 1794 then exchanged his interest in the plantation with Thomas Cook's stagecoach wayside town Cooksville.

The main block is three bays wide by one bay deep, with a gambrel roof and 1-story hip-roofed porch. It features a long screened porch with exposed rafter tails and an 1820 stone kitchen addition. Also on the property is a stone slave quarters outbuilding and a small frame outbuilding.

It was listed on the National Register of Historic Places in 2008.

== See also ==
- List of Howard County properties in the Maryland Historical Trust
- Roxbury Mill
