= Glenwood, Howard County, Maryland =

Unincorporated community in Maryland, U.S.

Coordinates: 39°17′15″N 77°01′41″W

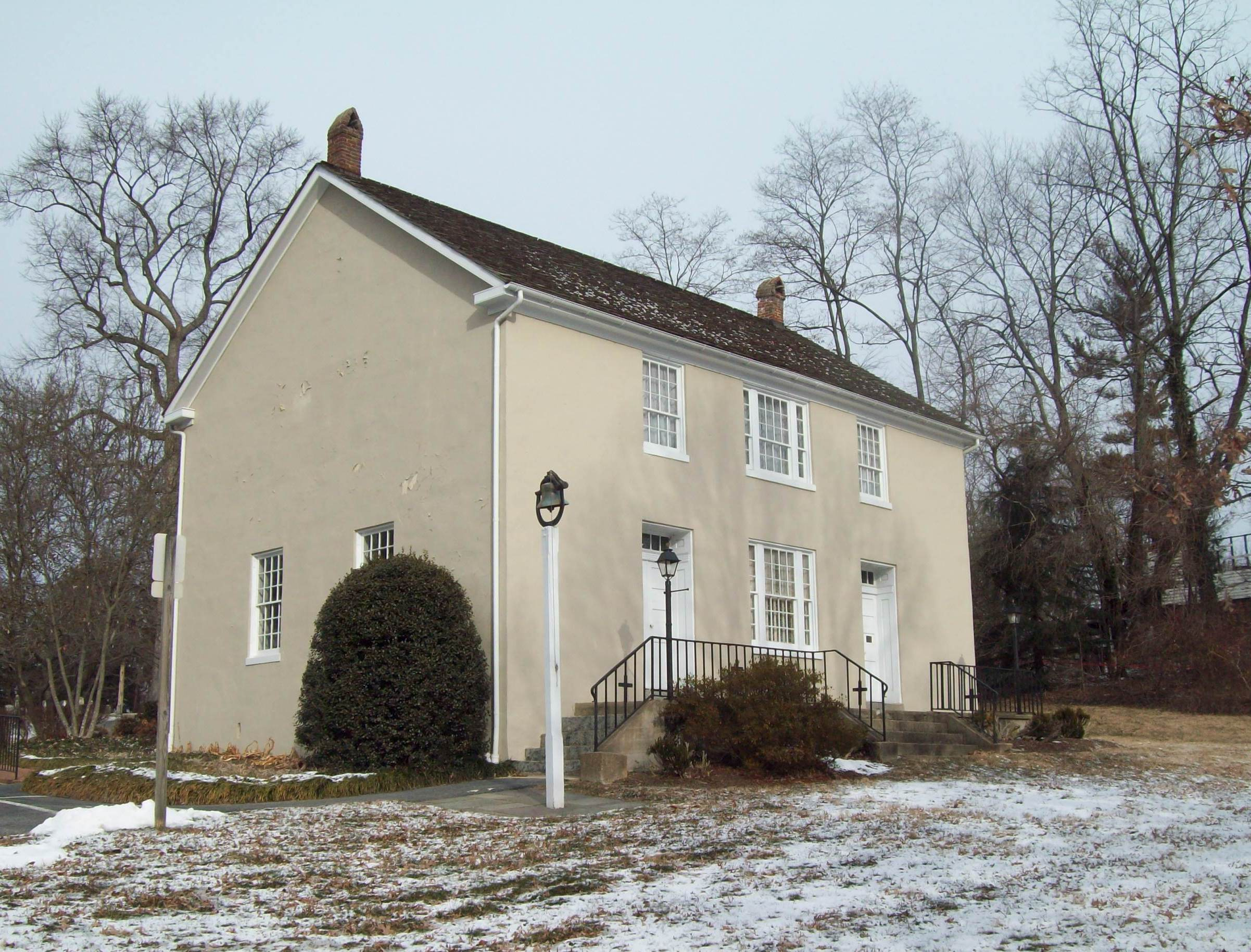
Union Chapel, January 2011

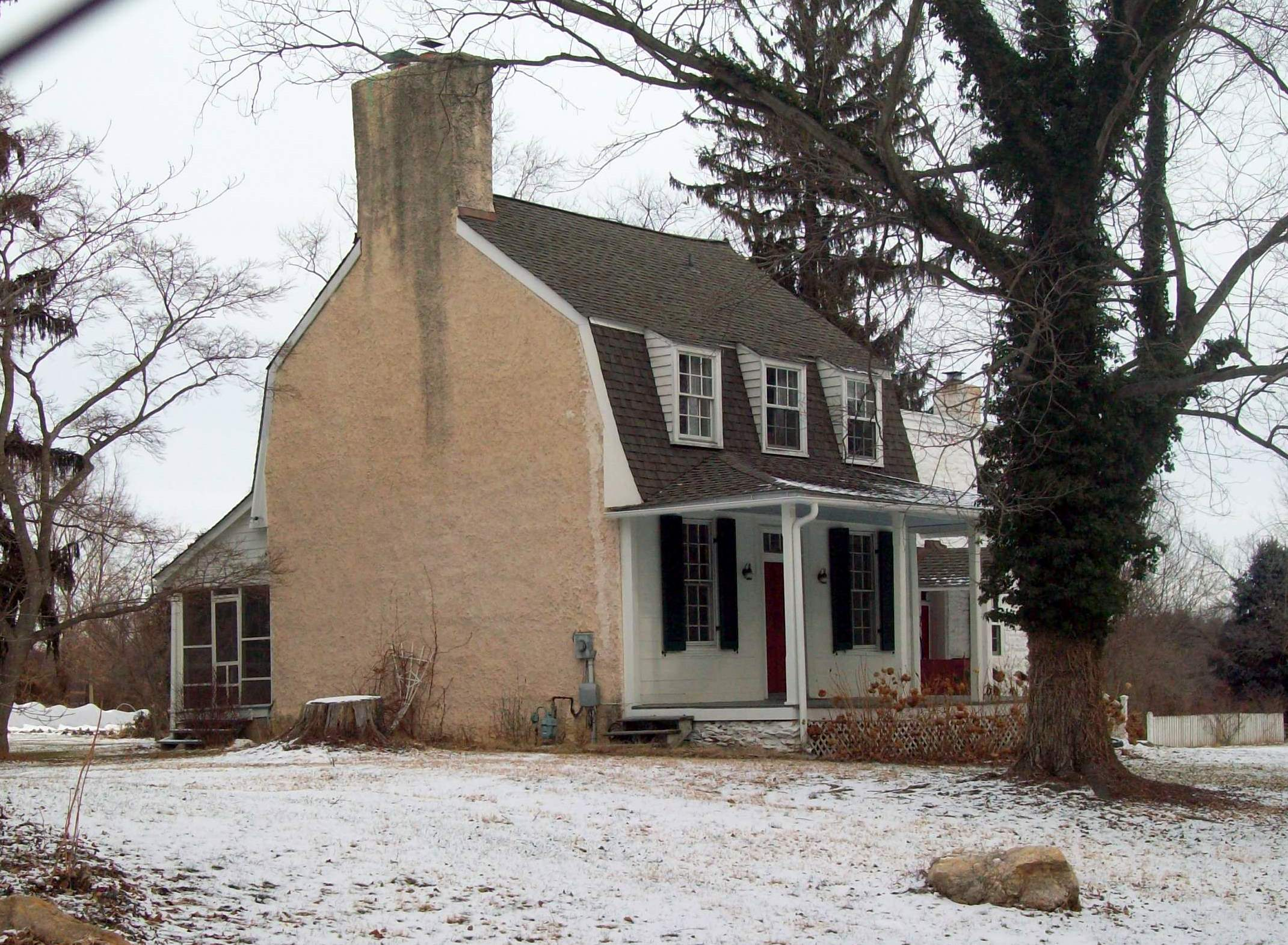
Round About Hills, January 2011

Glenwood is an unincorporated community in Howard County, Maryland, United States. It is located between Baltimore and Washington, D.C., therefore attracting commuters to those employment centers. The community features acres of open space and is districted to Bushy Park Elementary, Glenwood and Folly Quarter Middle, and Glenelg High schools. Union Chapel was listed on the National Register of Historic Places in 1975 and Round About Hills was added in 2008. The population in 2020 was approximately 3,416.

== History ==
The area was settled in the early 18th century by the Ridgley and Warfield families forming large tobacco plantations: "Bushy Park", "Longwood", "Ellerslie" and others. In 1822, James B. Matthews purchased a 200-acre farm and stone home from Caleb Dorsey. He opened a post office on July 30, 1841, giving the area the name "Matthews Store" in the Howard District of Anne Arundel County, which operated until January 1874. The Union Chapel was built in 1833. The Howard District of Anne Arundel county became the newly formed Howard County. Despite southern sympathies, the Civil War ended slave labor on the local farms. The Phrenakosmian Hall was opened, renamed to the Howard Institute serving 25 children. On January 13, 1874, the Glenwood postal stop opened. It was renamed to Glenwood by James Matthew's son, Professor Lycurgus Matthews.

In 1995, Glenwood land developer Randolph Ayersman made national news after police found that profits from drug sales were being used to buy and develop properties under A&A contracting in Glenwood.

== Government ==
Government services are provided by Howard County. The Howard County Fire and Rescue Station 13 - Glenwood is located adjacent to Western Regional Park.

Glenwood is home to the Gary J. Arthur community center and the Glenwood branch of the Howard County library.

The United States Postal Service provides postal mail service from the Glenwood Post Office.

== Economy ==
Glenwood is primarily a residential community consisting of 1,088 households which are primarily single-family homes on larger lots. The majority of retail and commerce for Glenwood is situated along the Maryland Route 97 corridor that runs north–south through the community.

The private Cattail Creek Country Club is located in Glenwood, and features an 18-hole, par 72 golf course designed by Willard Byrd, and 7 clay tennis courts.

The average household income in Glenwood is $305,598, making it one of the wealthiest communities in the United States.

== Education ==
Residents of Glenwood fall within the Howard County Public School System, and are served by Bushy Park Elementary School, Glenwood Middle School, and Glenelg High School.

== See also ==
- Round About Hills
- Roxbury Mill
