= Montpelier Mansion (Laurel, Maryland) =

Historic house in Maryland, United States

- Montpelier
- U.S. National Register of Historic Places
- U.S. National Historic Landmark
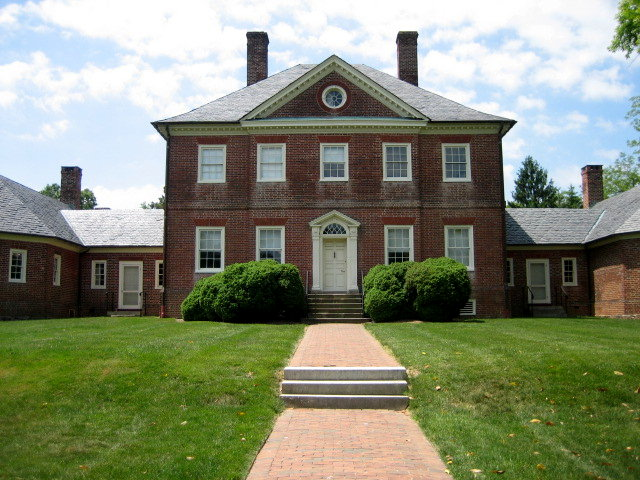
- Montpelier in May 2007

- Location within Maryland Location within the United States
- Nearest city: Laurel, Maryland
- Coordinates: 39°3′54″N 76°50′42″W
- Area: 110 acres (45 ha)
- Built: 1748 or 1783
- Architectural style: Georgian
- NRHP reference No.: 70000852

Significant dates
- Added to NRHP: April 17, 1970
- Designated NHL: April 15, 1970

Montpelier Mansion, sometimes known as the Snowden-Long House, New Birmingham, or simply Montpelier, is a five-part, Georgian style plantation house located south of Laurel in Prince George's County, Maryland. It was most likely constructed between 1781 and 1785. Built by Major Thomas Snowden and his wife Anne, the house is now a National Historic Landmark operated as a house museum. The home and 70 acres (28 ha) remain of what was once a slave plantation of about 9,000 acres (3,600 ha).

It was declared a National Historic Landmark in 1970, primarily for its architecture.

== History ==
Richard Snowden originally migrated to America in 1658 from Birmingham, England, where his family had settled for many years after originating in Wales. Richard the immigrant had a son, Richard (1719–1753), who had a son, Richard the "iron master" (d. 1763). Richard the iron master acquired much wealth through an iron forge, mining local iron. Richard then had a son, Thomas (1722–1770), who had a son Major Thomas (1751–1803), so called because of his service in the American Revolution. Major Thomas married Anne Ridgely, who was raised at an earlier estate named Montpelier in Fulton, Maryland, and built the Mansion circa 1783.

Their son Nicholas Snowden, who had been born at the mansion in 1786, was its next owner, until he died in 1831. (His son Nicholas N. Snowden, also born at the mansion, became a farmer next to Avondale Mill, and died at Manassas while serving in the 1st Maryland Infantry, CSA.) The home then passed to Nicholas' daughter Julianna Maria who married Dr. Theodore Jenkins there in 1835. Dr. Jenkins died in 1866 and upon Mrs. Jenkins' later death, the mansion passed to her children who kept ownership in the family until 1890. The home was later owned by speculative investors W.P. Davis and Martin W. Chollar. In 1895, it was sold to Josephine D. Taylor of New York as a summer home. Its title went to Lewis H. Blakeman of New York in 1900, then to New York writer Edmund H. Pendleton who lived there from 1905 until his death in 1910, having made it his winter home. Pendleton's estate sold the mansion to Otto V. von Schrader in 1911.

After a succession of other owners, mansion ownership transferred in 1928 to Breckinridge Long, Undersecretary of State under Franklin D. Roosevelt and United States Ambassador to Italy from 1933 to 1936. Long's daughter Christine L. Willcox, the mansion's last private owner, donated the property to the Maryland-National Capital Park and Planning Commission in 1961. It was shown to the public as part of the U.S. Bicentennial celebrations in 1976. The same year, a barn budgeted to become a public arts center was destroyed by arson. The Mansion was renovated in the 1980s with funds from a state grant. The historic home was opened as a public tourist attraction in 1985, reflecting its ownership by Nicholas Snowden in 1830. The mansion can be rented for conferences and weddings and the grounds serve as a cultural center, hosting special exhibitions and performances.

== Famous visitors ==
- Abigail Adams
- Franklin D. Roosevelt
- George Washington, at least twice (May and September 1787) on his way to and from Philadelphia as a delegate to the Constitutional Convention
- Martha Washington, on the way to her husband's first presidential inauguration in 1789
- Woodrow Wilson

== Description ==
Montpelier is a five-part Georgian country house with a central block and flanking end pavilions connected to the main block by hyphens. The two-story central block has a five-bay elevation, with a projecting three-bay pavilion topped by a pediment. The hipped roof features large projecting chimneys emerging about halfway up the roofline. The front and rear doors are similar in character, with flanking pilasters and an open pediment The interior features carved woodwork. The paneling in the drawing room conceals a secret doorway leading to a set of stairs.

In 1970, the house was set in formal gardens. Three terraces were outlined in boxwood hedges and arranged as an allée. A boxwood maze near the south wing was stated to be more than 200 years old. Most of the boxwood hedges have since been removed. A hexagonal eighteenth-century summerhouse is located at the end of the allée.

== Gallery ==
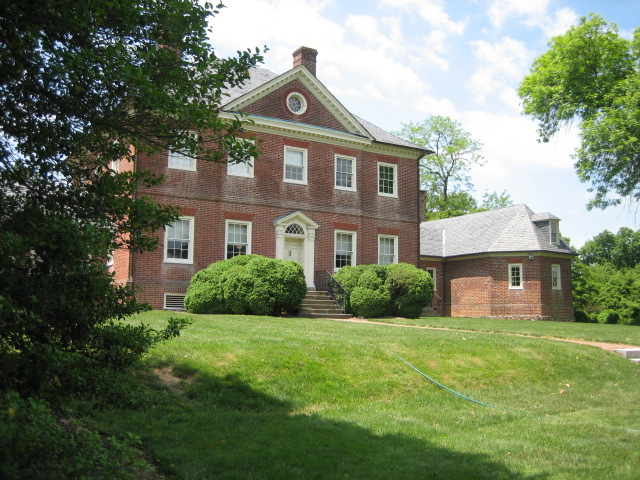
Montpelier in May 2007

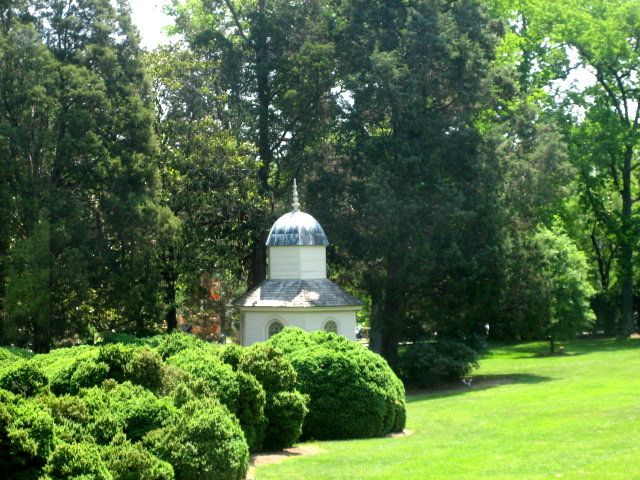
The Montpelier Summer House in May 2007

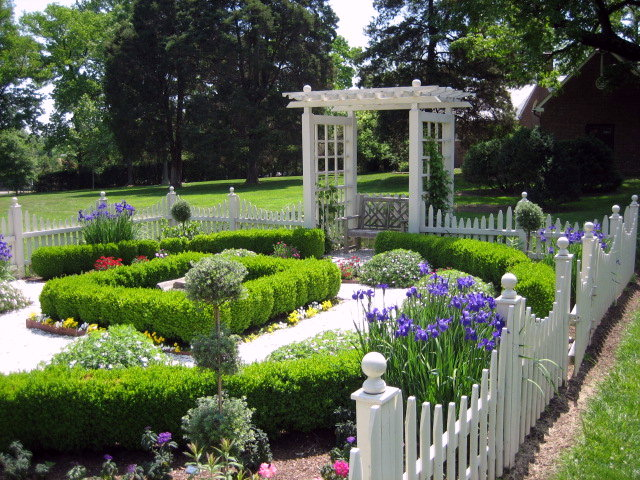
The Gardens at Montpelier

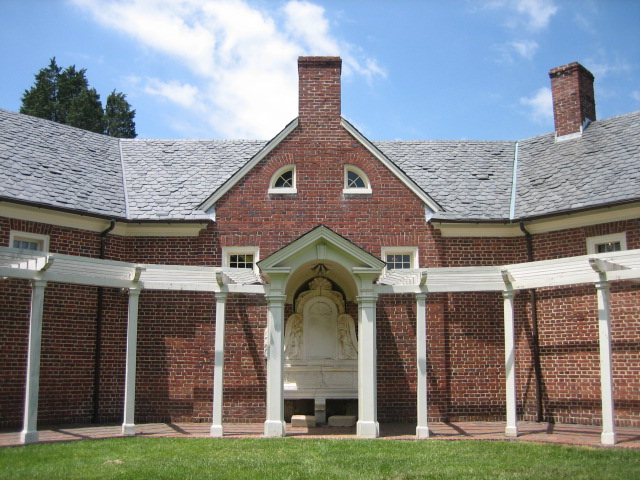
The Gardens at Montpelier

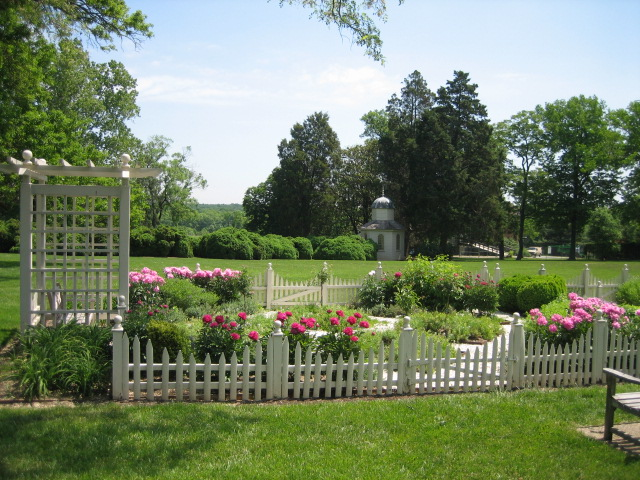
The Gardens at Montpelier

== See also ==
- List of National Historic Landmarks in Maryland
- National Register of Historic Places listings in Prince George's County, Maryland
