= Truss bridge =

Bridge whose load-bearing superstructure is composed of a truss

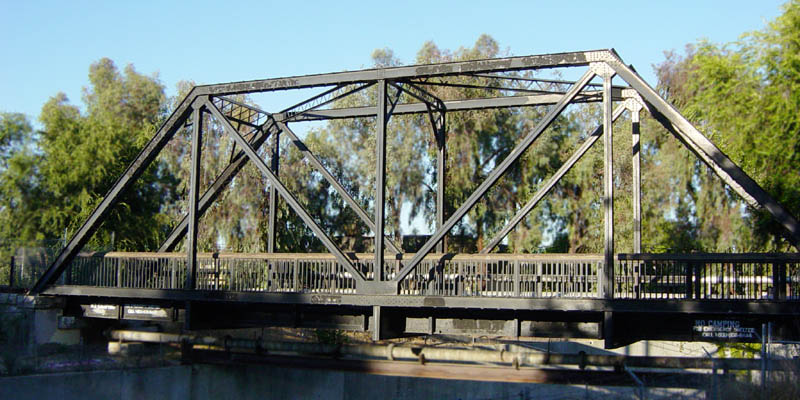
- A truss bridge operated by Southern Pacific Railroad in Contra Costa County, California, converted to pedestrian use and pipeline support
- Span range: Short to medium – not very long unless it is continuous
- Material: Timber, iron, steel, reinforced concrete, prestressed concrete
- Movable: May be movable – see movable bridge
- Design effort: Medium
- Falsework required: Depends upon length, materials, and degree of prefabrication

A truss bridge is a bridge whose load-bearing superstructure is composed of a truss, a structure of connected elements, usually forming triangular units. The connected elements, typically straight, may be stressed from tension, compression, or sometimes both in response to dynamic loads. There are several types of truss bridges, including some with simple designs that were among the first bridges designed in the 19th and early 20th centuries. A truss bridge is economical to construct primarily because it uses materials efficiently.

== Design ==
The components of a typical truss bridge

The nature of a truss allows the analysis of its structure using a few assumptions and the application of Newton's laws of motion according to the branch of physics known as statics. For purposes of analysis, trusses are assumed to be pin-jointed where the straight components meet, meaning that taken alone, every joint on the structure is functionally considered to be a flexible joint as opposed to a rigid joint with the strength to maintain its shape, and the resulting shape and strength of the structure are only maintained by the interlocking of the components. This assumption means that members of the truss (chords, verticals, and diagonals) will act only in tension or compression. A more complex analysis is required where rigid joints impose significant bending loads upon the elements, as in a Vierendeel truss.

In the bridge illustrated in the infobox at the top, vertical members are in tension, lower horizontal members in tension, shear, and bending, outer diagonal and top members are in compression, while the inner diagonals are in tension. The central vertical member stabilizes the upper compression member, preventing it from buckling. If the top member is sufficiently stiff then this vertical element may be eliminated. If the lower chord (a horizontal member of a truss) is sufficiently resistant to bending and shear, the outer vertical elements may be eliminated, but with additional strength added to other members in compensation. The ability to distribute the forces in various ways has led to a large variety of truss bridge types. Some types may be more advantageous when the wood is employed for compression elements while other types may be easier to erect in particular site conditions, or when the balance between labor, machinery, and material costs has certain favorable proportions.

The inclusion of the elements shown is largely an engineering decision based upon economics, being a balance between the costs of raw materials, off-site fabrication, component transportation, on-site erection, the availability of machinery, and the cost of labor. In other cases, the appearance of the structure may take on greater importance and so influence the design decisions beyond mere matters of economics. Modern materials such as prestressed concrete and fabrication methods, such as automated welding, and the changing price of steel relative to that of labor have significantly influenced the design of modern bridges.

=== Model bridges ===
A pure truss can be represented as a pin-jointed structure, one where the only forces on the truss members are tension or compression, not bending. This is used in the teaching of statics, by the building of model bridges from spaghetti. Spaghetti is brittle and although it can carry a modest tension force, it breaks easily if bent. A model spaghetti bridge thus demonstrates the use of a truss structure to produce a usefully strong complete structure from individually weak elements.

== United States ==
In the United States, because wood was in abundance, early truss bridges would typically use carefully fitted timbers for members taking compression and iron rods for tension members, usually constructed as a covered bridge to protect the structure. In 1820, a simple form of truss, Town's lattice truss, was patented, and had the advantage of requiring neither high labor skills nor much metal. Few iron truss bridges were built in the United States before 1850.

Truss bridges became a common type of bridge built from the 1870s through the 1930s. Examples of these bridges still remain across the US, but their numbers are dropping rapidly as they are demolished and replaced with new structures. As metal slowly started to replace timber, wrought iron bridges in the US started being built on a large scale in the 1870s. Bowstring truss bridges were a common truss design during this time, with their arched top chords. Companies like the Massillon Bridge Company of Massillon, Ohio, and the King Bridge Company of Cleveland, became well-known, as they marketed their designs to cities and townships.

The bowstring truss design fell out of favor due to a lack of durability, and gave way to the Pratt truss design, which was stronger. Again, the bridge companies marketed their designs, with the Wrought Iron Bridge Company in the lead. As the 1880s and 1890s progressed, steel began to replace wrought iron as the preferred material. Other truss designs were used during this time, including the camel-back. By the 1910s, many states developed standard plan truss bridges, including steel Warren pony truss bridges.

In the 1920s and 1930s, Pennsylvania and several states continued to build steel truss bridges, using massive steel through-truss bridges for long spans. Other states, such as Michigan, used standard plan concrete girder and beam bridges, and only a limited number of truss bridges were built.

== Deck types ==
The truss may carry its deck on top, in the middle, or at the bottom of the truss. Bridges with the deck at the top or the bottom are the most common as this allows both the top and bottom to be stiffened, forming a box truss. When the deck is atop the truss, it is called a deck truss; an example of this was the I-35W Mississippi River bridge. When the truss members are both above and below the deck it is called a through truss; an example of this is the Pulaski Skyway, and where the sides extend above the roadbed but are not connected, a pony truss or half-through truss.

Sometimes both the upper and lower chords support decks, forming a double-decked truss bridge. This can be used to separate rail from road traffic or to separate the two directions of road traffic.

Since through truss bridges have supports located over the bridge deck, they are susceptible to being hit by overheight loads when used on highways. The I-5 Skagit River bridge collapsed after such a strike; before the collapse, similar incidents had been common and had necessitated frequent repairs.

=== Gallery ===
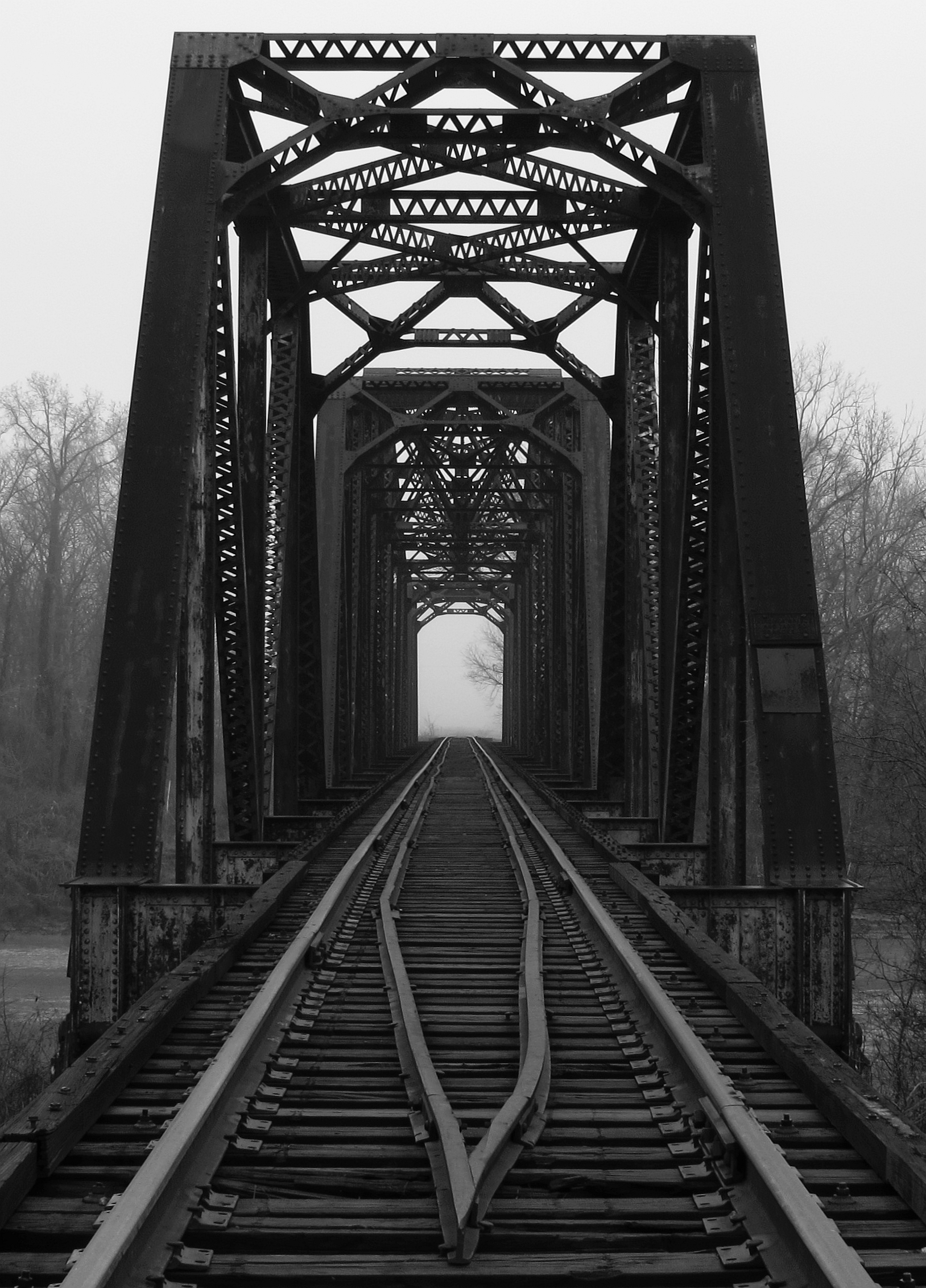
A railway bridge with a rail track in Leflore County, Mississippi

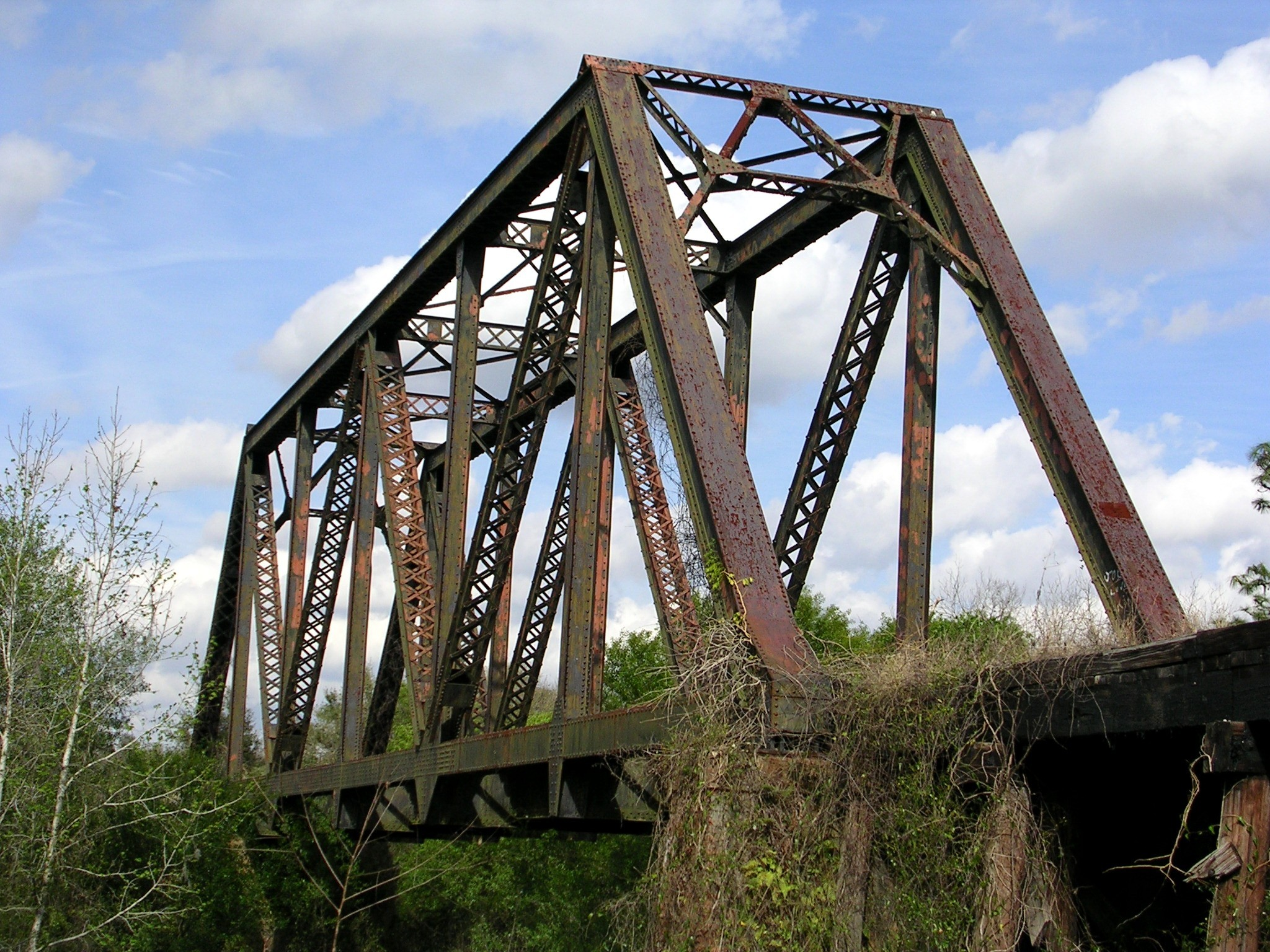
Pratt through truss of the former Seaboard Air Line Railway, located near Willow, Florida; abandoned since the mid-1980s

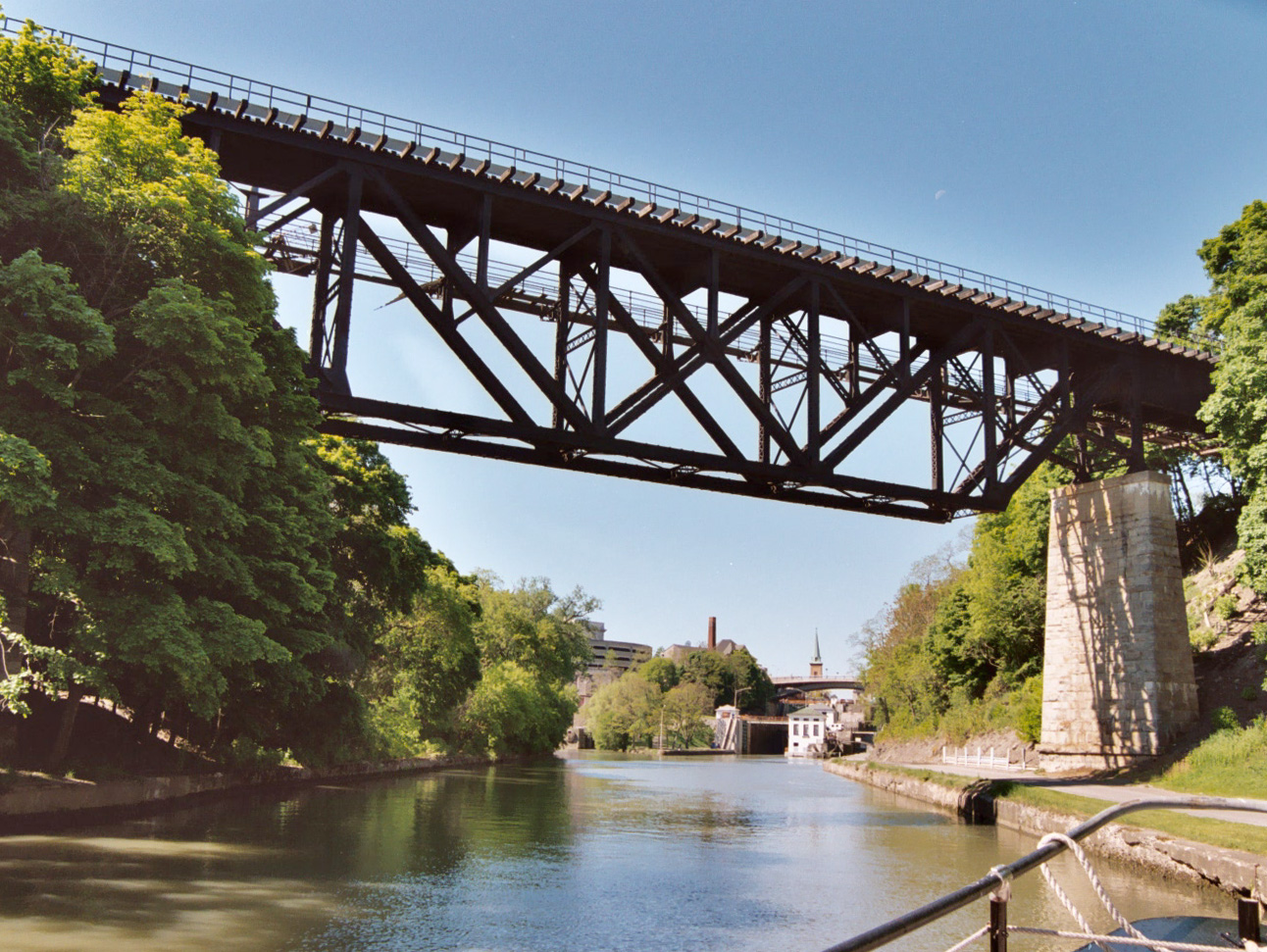
Deck truss railroad bridge over the Erie Canal in Lockport, New York

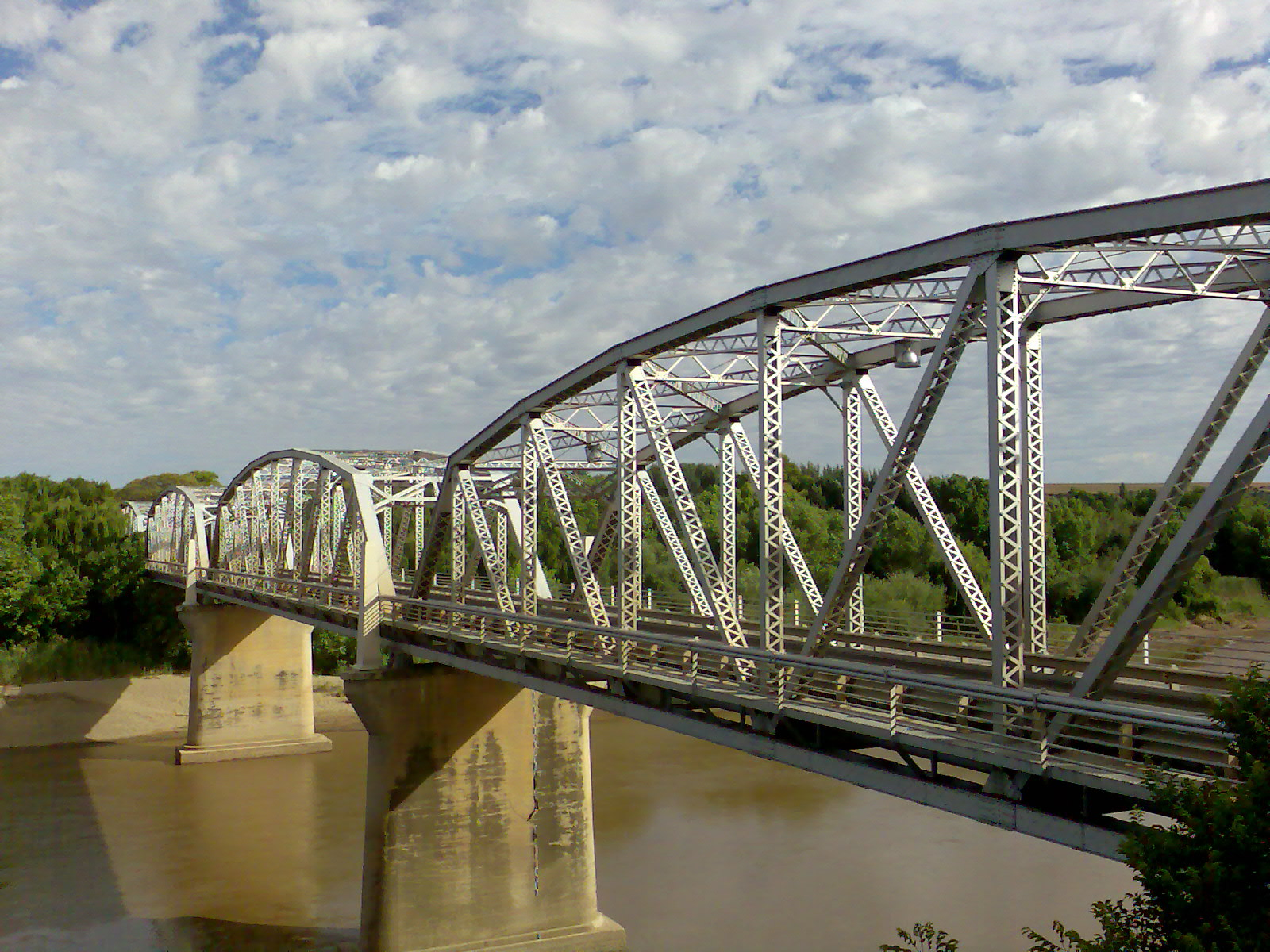
The four span through truss General Hertzog Bridge over the Orange River at Aliwal North carries vehicular traffic

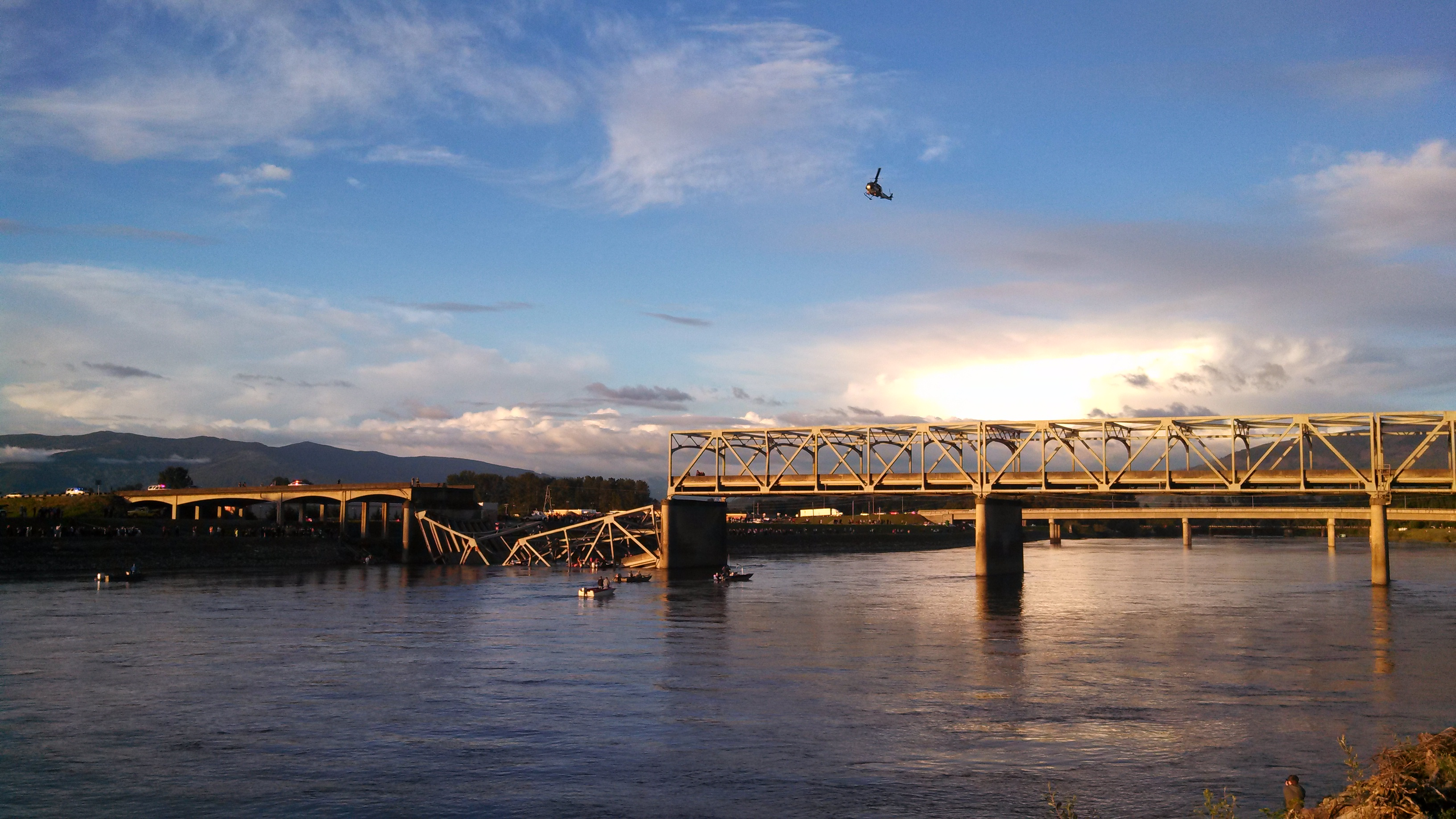
The through truss Skagit River bridge on Interstate 5 collapsed after an overhead support was hit by a passing truck

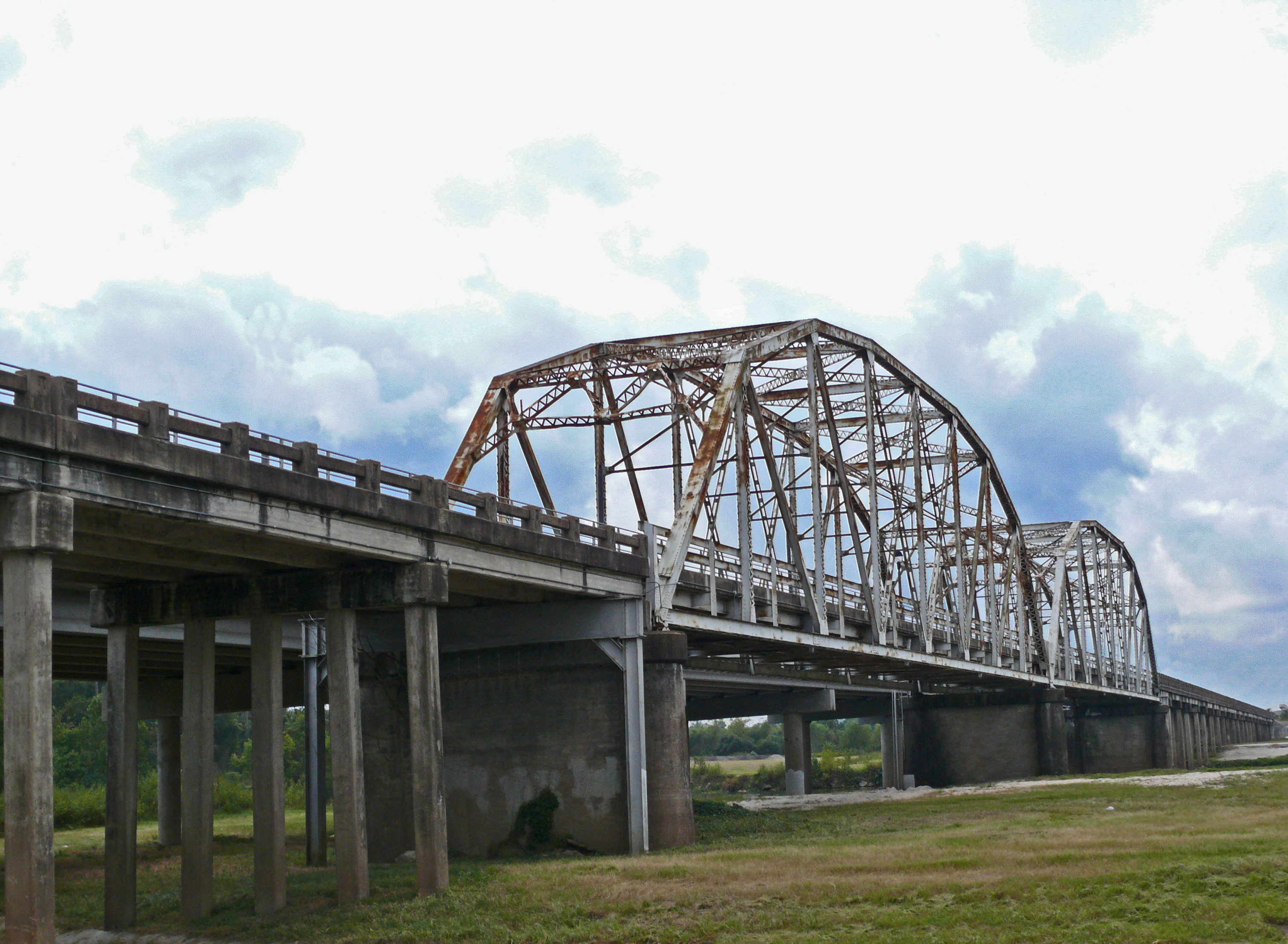
Old San Jacinto River truss bridge in Humble, Texas

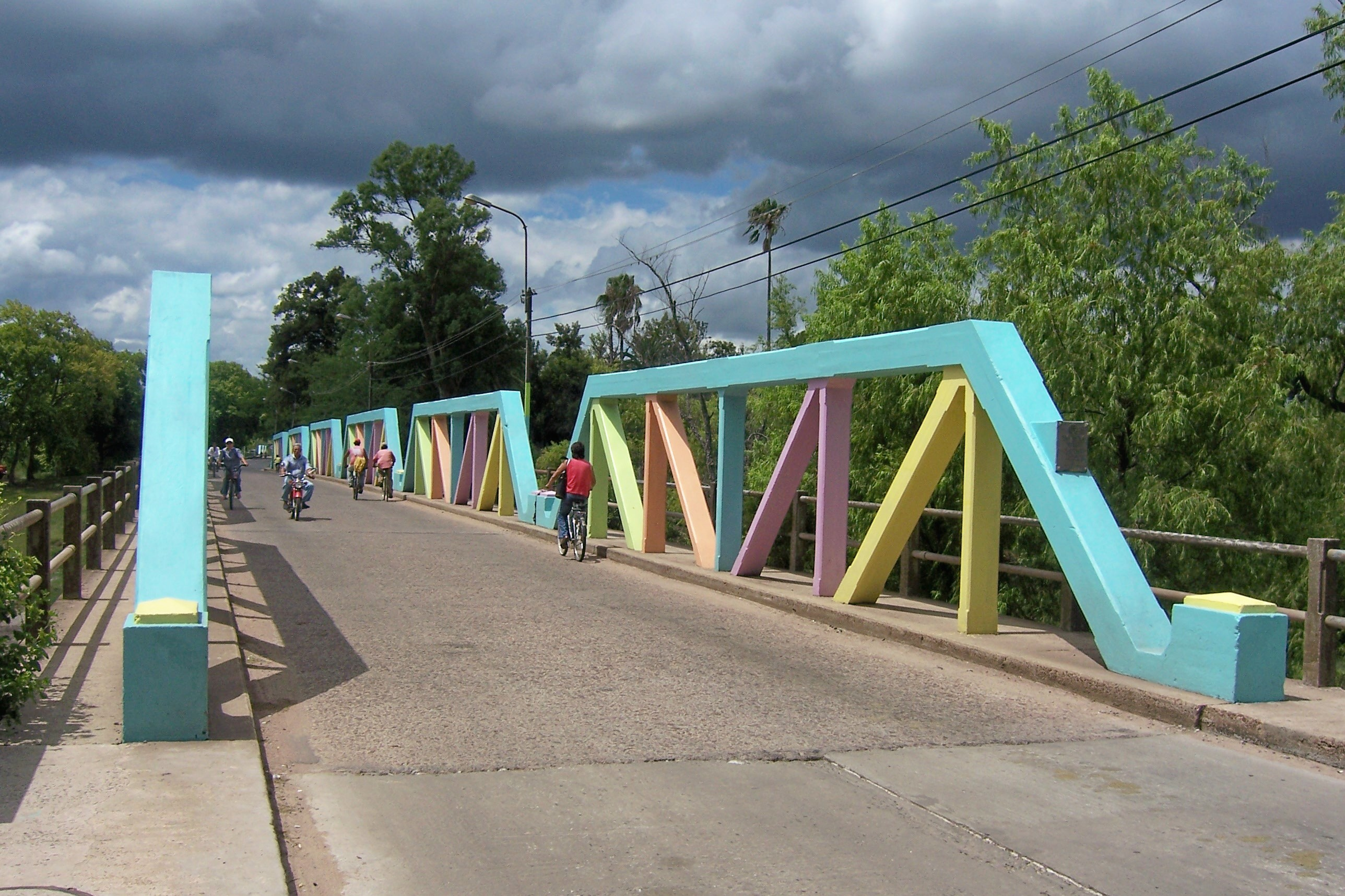
Pony truss bridge of reinforced concrete

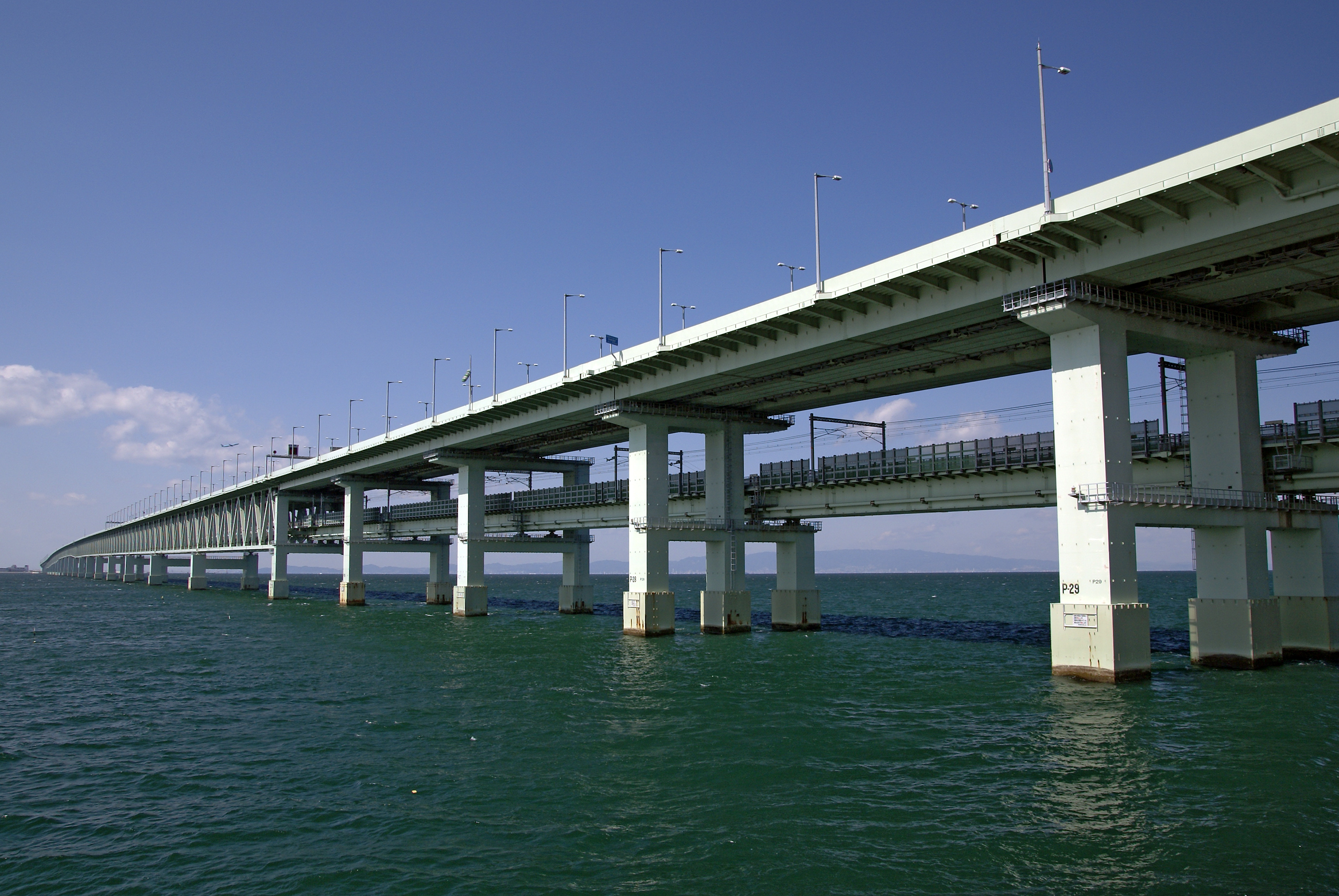
Sky Gate Bridge R at Kansai International Airport, Osaka, Japan, is the longest double-decked truss bridge in the world. It carries three lanes of automobile traffic on top and two of rail below over nine truss spans.

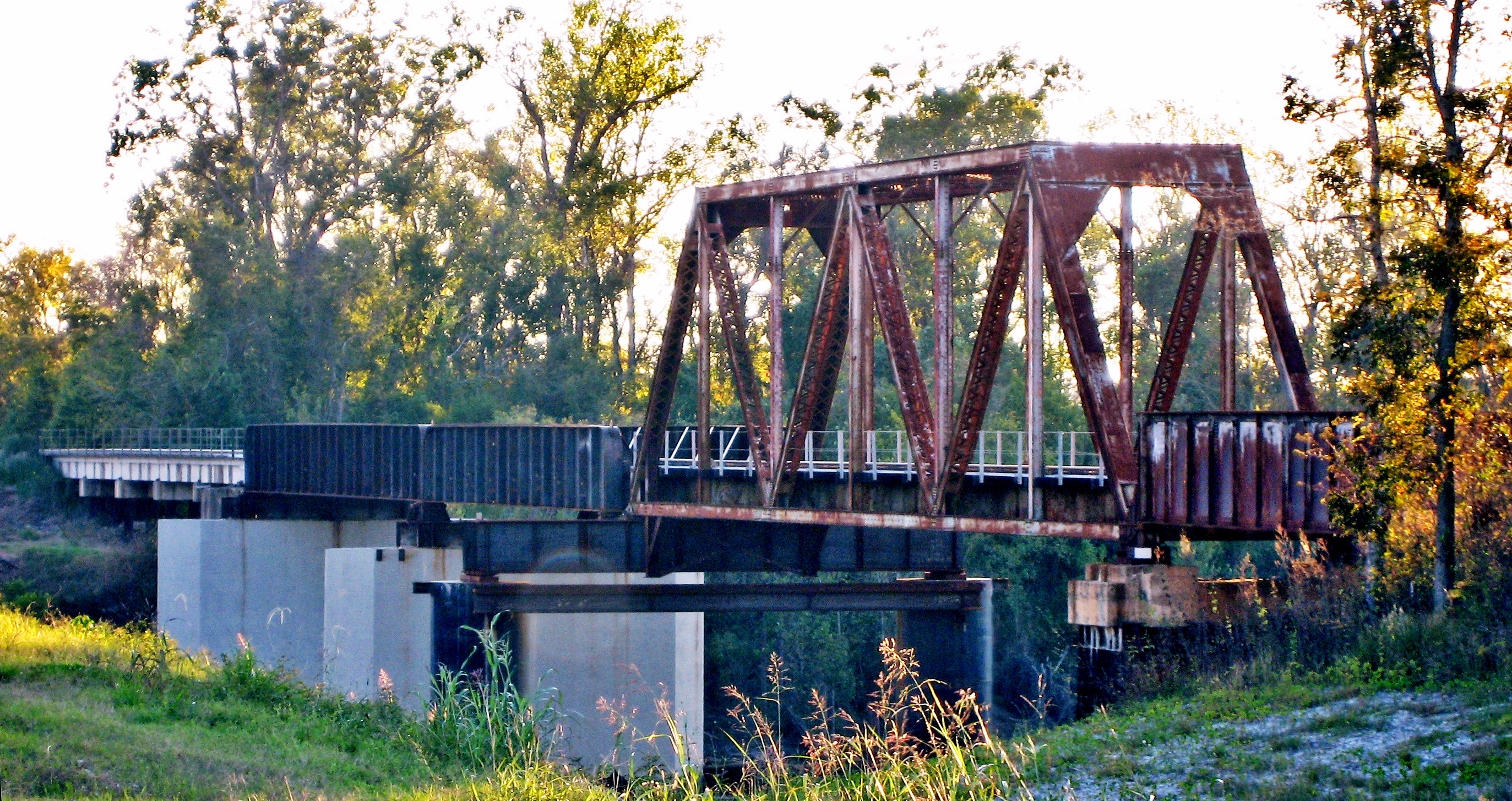
Railroad Truss bridge over Trinity River near Goodrich, Texas

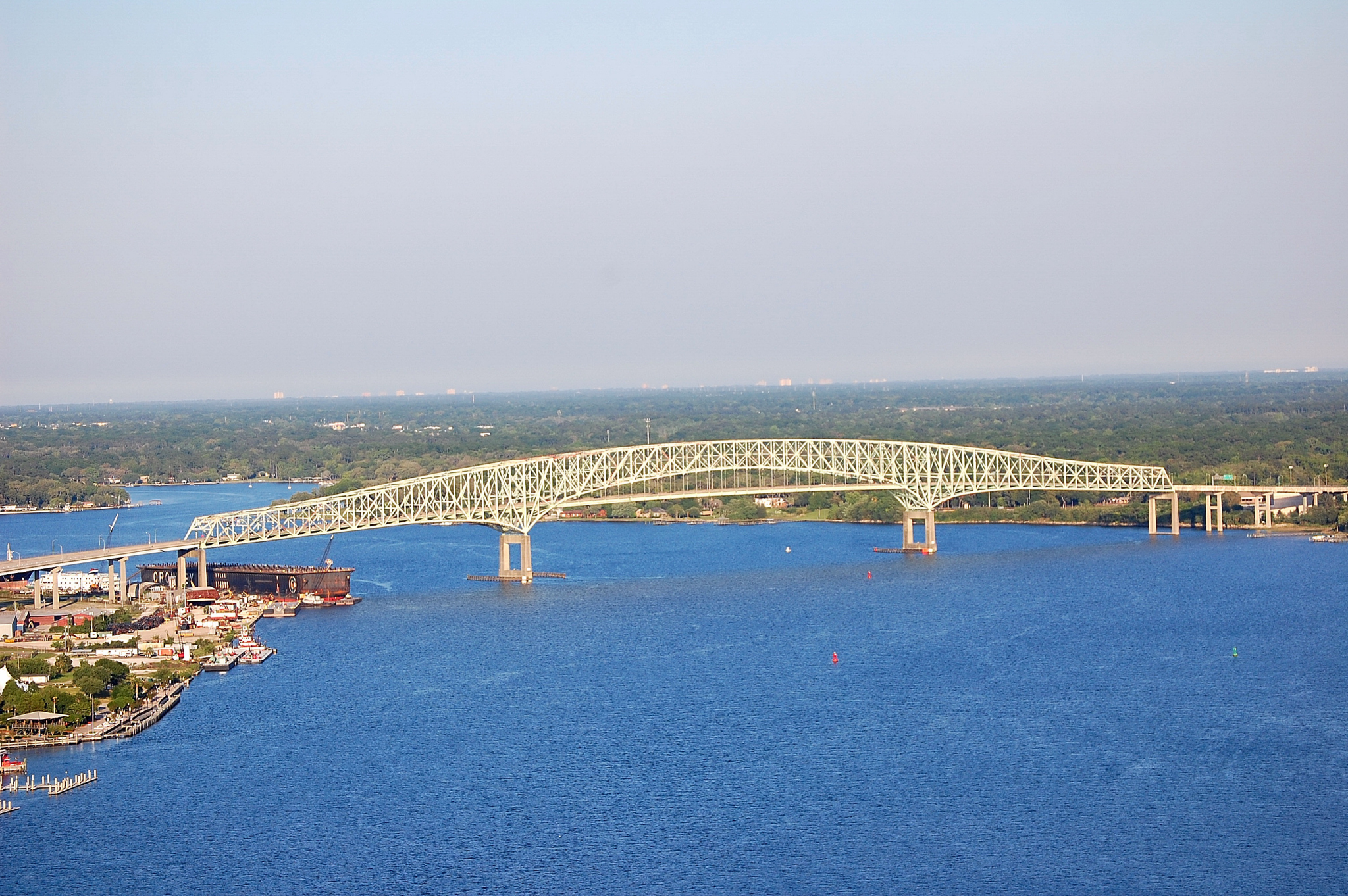
The Hart Bridge spanning the St. Johns River in Jacksonville, Florida, is a continuous, cantilevered truss bridge which combines a suspended road deck on the 332-metre (1,088 ft) main span and through truss decks on the adjacent approach spans.

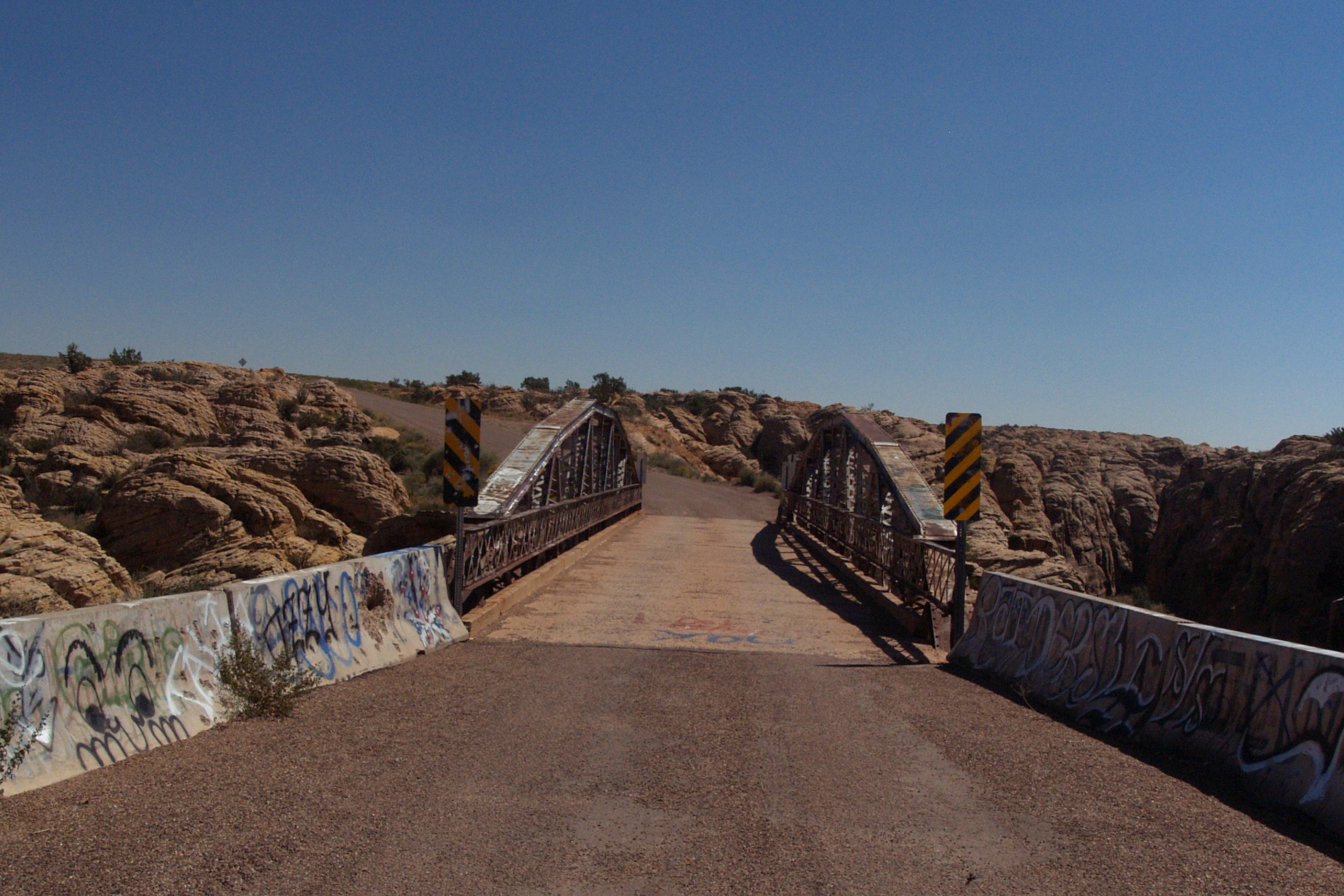
Chevelon Creek Warren Pony Truss Bridge, Chevelon Creek, Navajo County Arizona built 1913

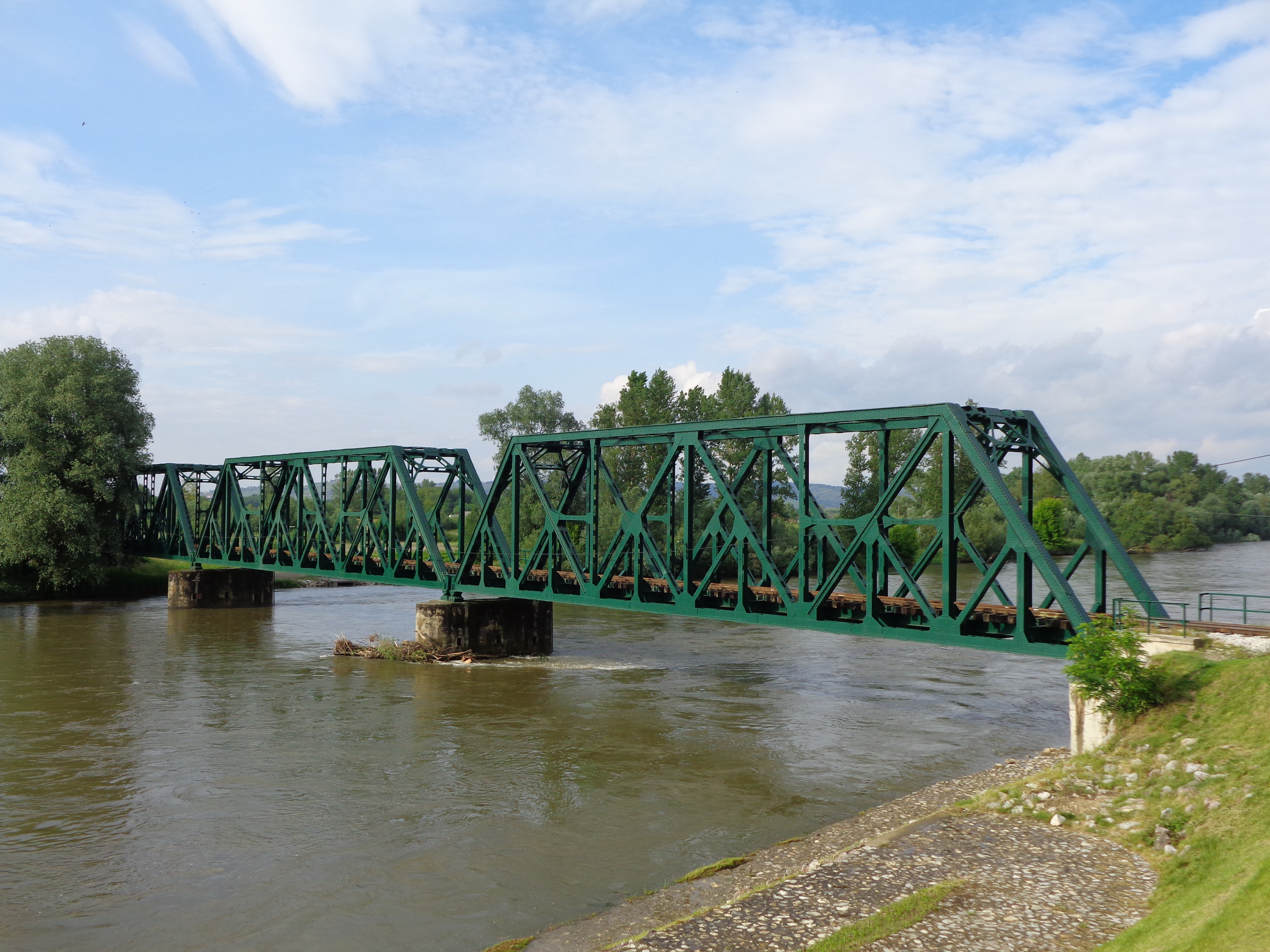
Side view of the iron truss railway bridge over Mura River in Mursko Središće, Croatia

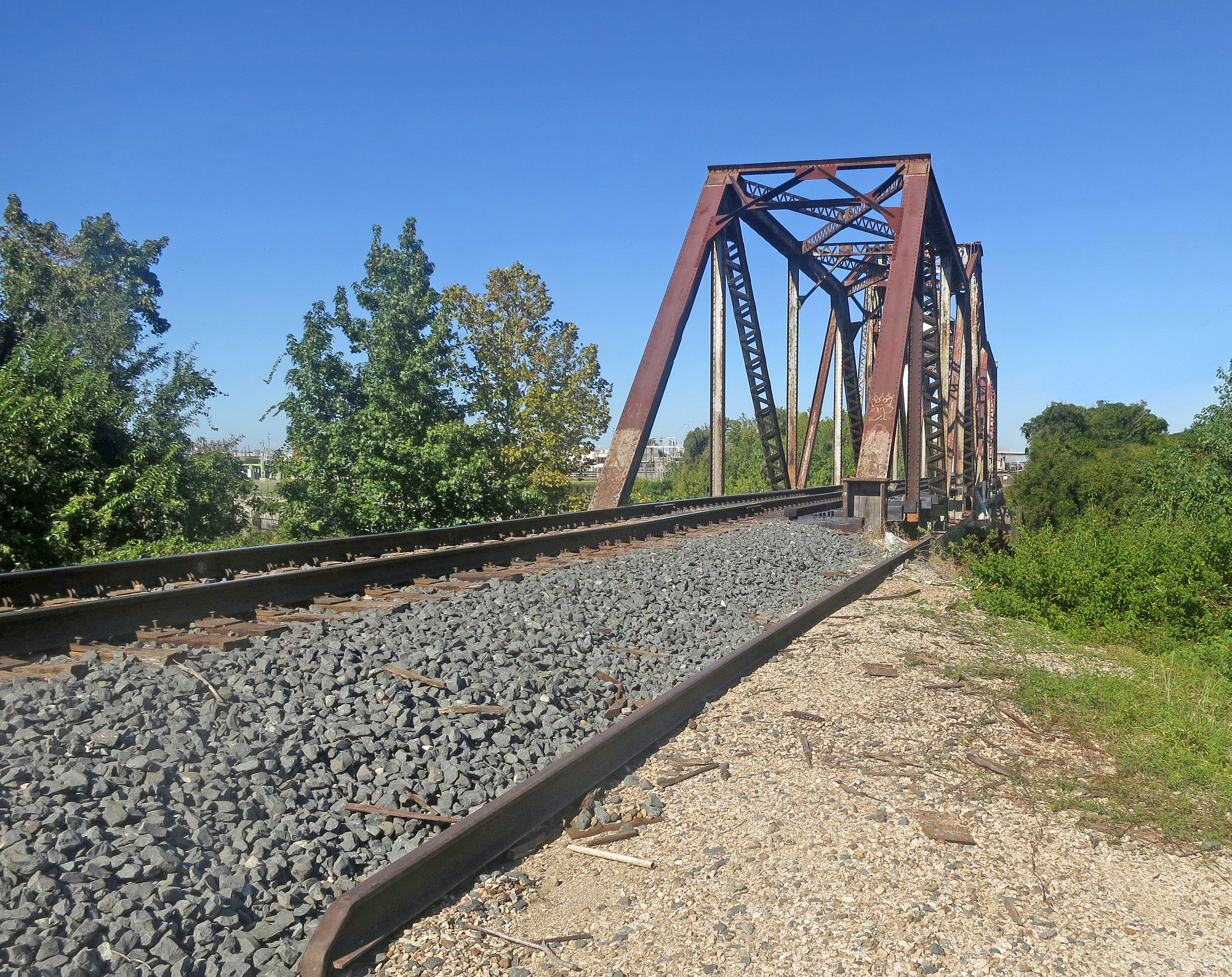
Railroad Truss Drawbridge across Buffalo Bayou—Houston

== Multiple spans ==
Truss bridges consisting of more than one span may be either a continuous truss or a series of simple trusses. In the simple truss design, each span is supported only at the ends and is fully independent of any adjacent spans. Each span must fully support the weight of any vehicles traveling over it (the live load).

In contrast, a continuous truss functions as a single rigid structure over multiple supports. This means that the live load on one span is partially supported by the other spans, and consequently it is possible to use less material in the truss. Continuous truss bridges were not very common before the mid-20th century because they are statically indeterminate, which makes them difficult to design without the use of computers.

A multi-span truss bridge may also be constructed using cantilever spans, which are supported at only one end rather than both ends like other types of trusses. Unlike a continuous truss, a cantilever truss does not need to be connected rigidly, or indeed at all, at the center. Many cantilever bridges, like the Quebec Bridge shown below, have two cantilever spans supporting a simple truss in the center. The bridge would remain standing if the simple truss section were removed.

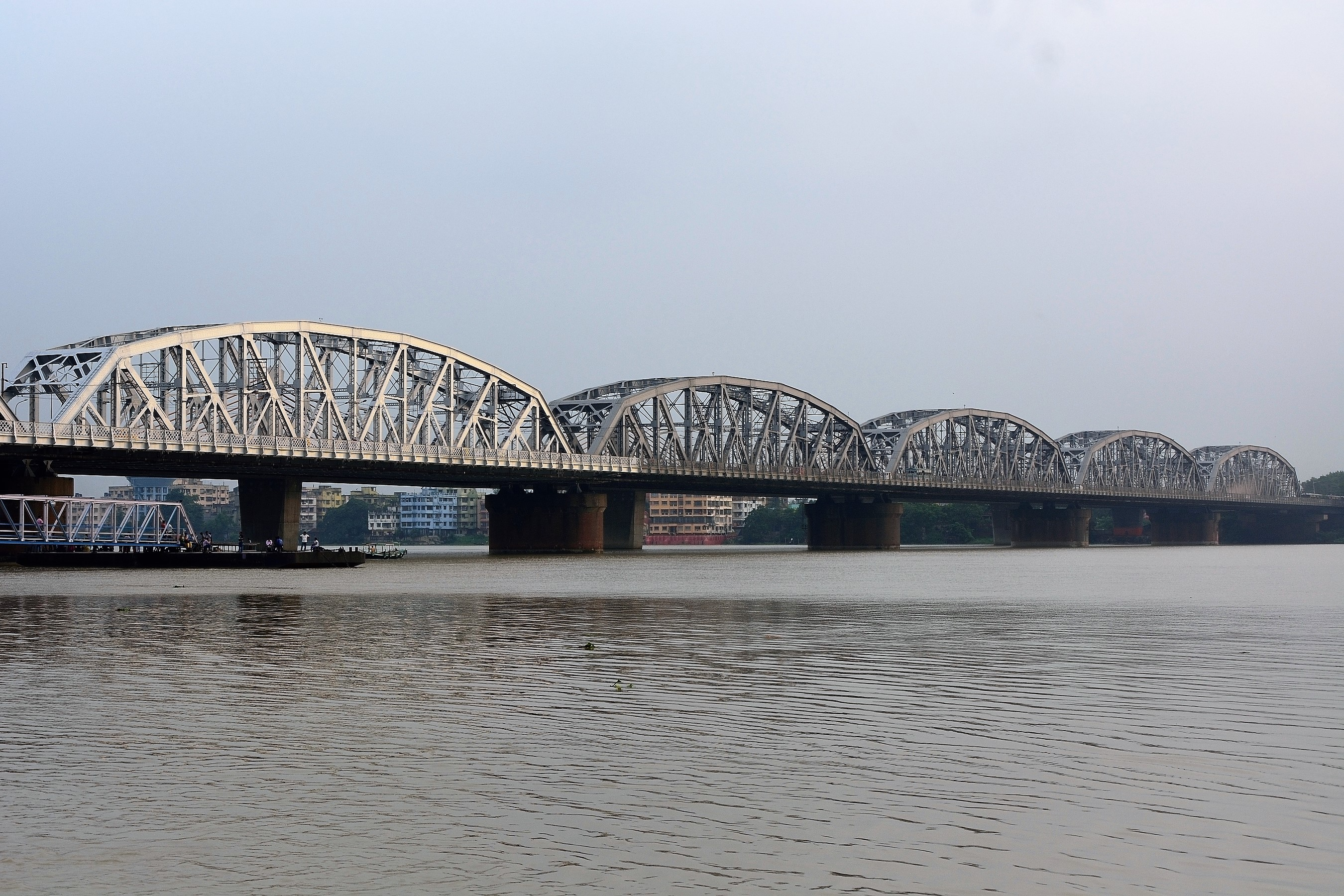
A multi-span simple truss bridge, Vivekananda Setu over the Hooghly River in Kolkata, India

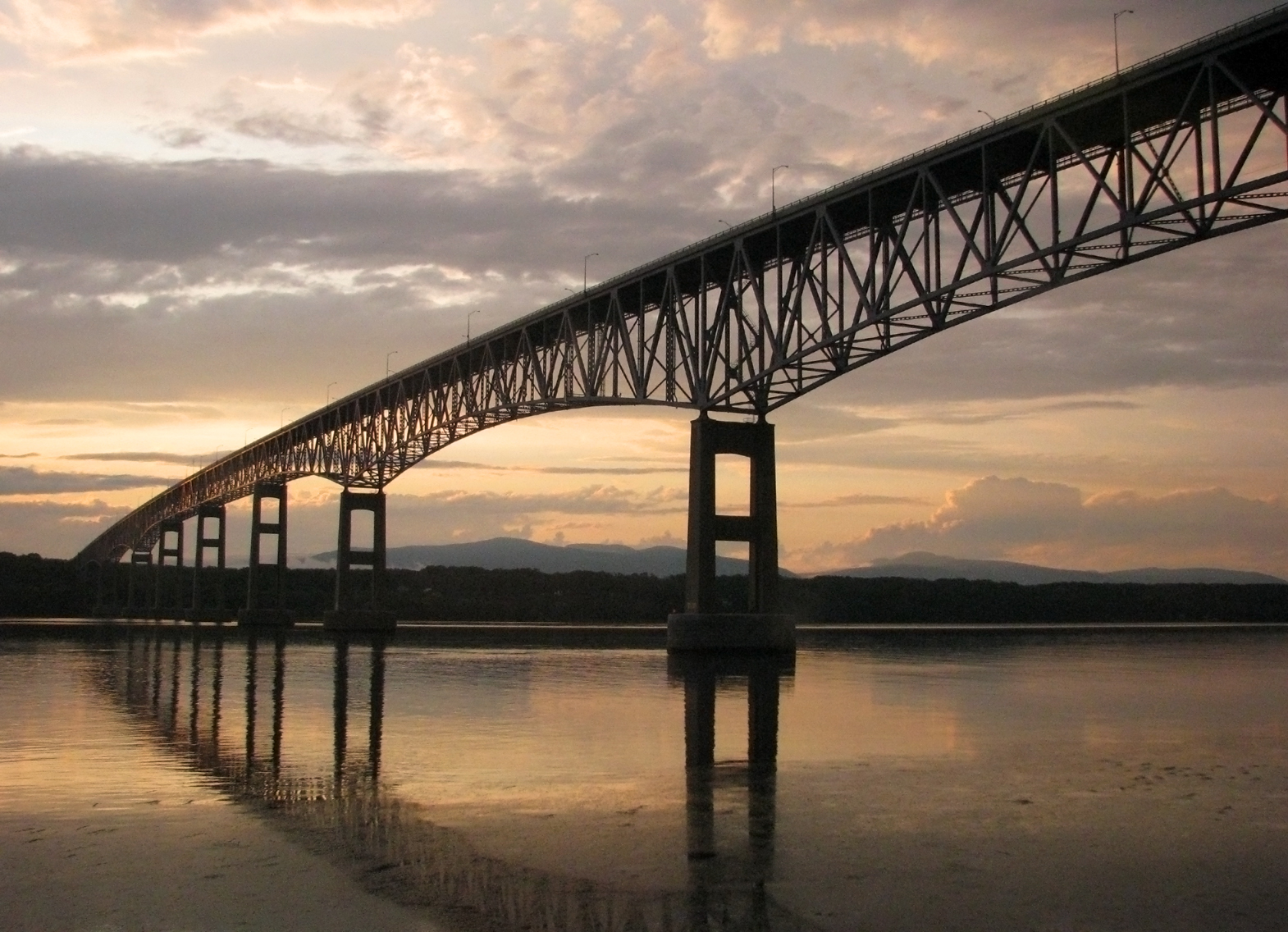
A continuous truss bridge, Kingston–Rhinecliff Bridge over the Hudson River in New York, United States

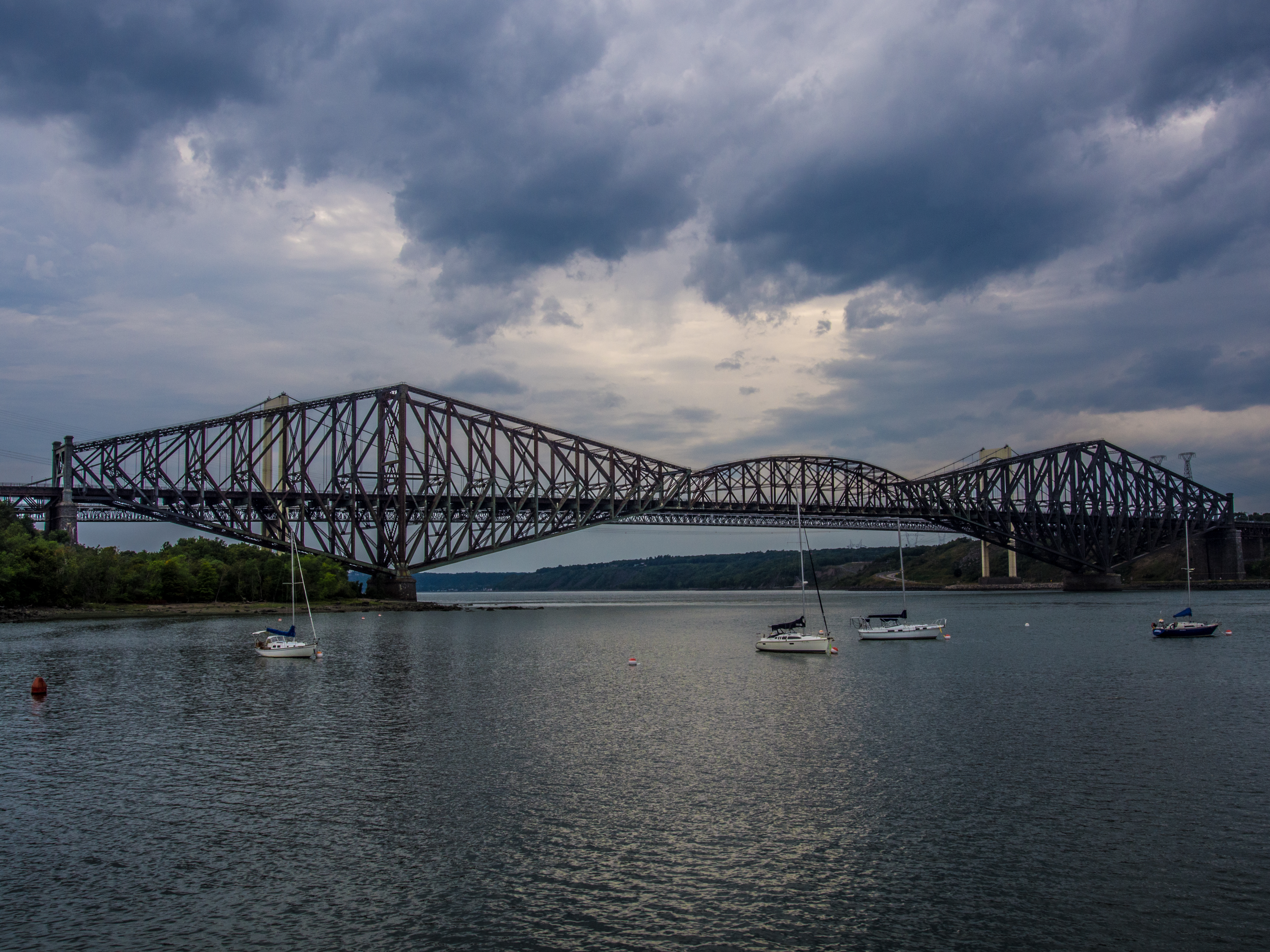
A cantilever truss bridge, Quebec Bridge over the Saint Lawrence River in Quebec, Canada

== Truss types ==
Bridges are the most widely known examples of truss use. There are many types, some of them dating back hundreds of years. Below are some of the more common designs.

=== Allan truss ===
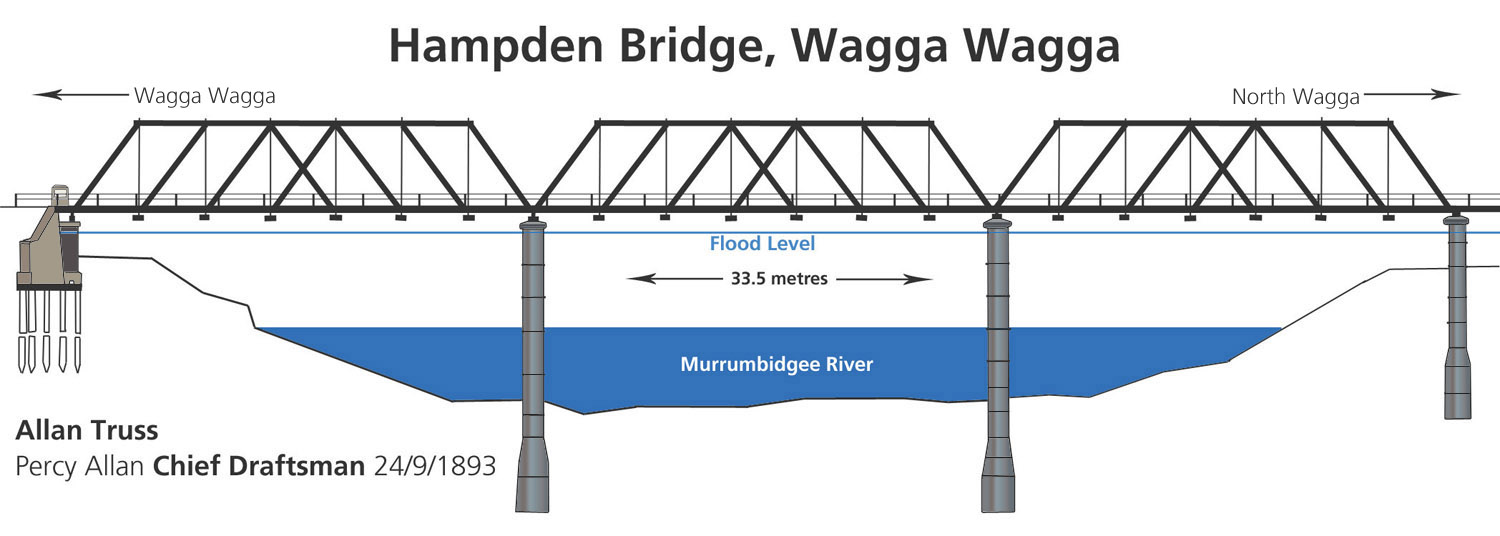
An Allan truss

The Allan truss, designed by Percy Allan, is partly based on the Howe truss. The first Allan truss was completed on 13 August 1894 over Glennies Creek at Camberwell, New South Wales and the last Allan truss bridge was built over Mill Creek near Wisemans Ferry in 1929. Completed in March 1895, the Tharwa Bridge located at Tharwa, Australian Capital Territory, was the second Allan truss bridge to be built, the oldest surviving bridge in the Australian Capital Territory and the oldest, longest continuously used Allan truss bridge. Completed in November 1895, the Hampden Bridge in Wagga Wagga, New South Wales, Australia, the first of the Allan truss bridges with overhead bracing, was originally designed as a steel bridge but was constructed with timber to reduce cost. In his design, Allan used Australian ironbark for its strength. A similar bridge also designed by Percy Allen is the Victoria Bridge on Prince Street, Picton, New South Wales. Also constructed of ironbark, the bridge is still in use today for pedestrian and light traffic.

=== Bailey truss ===

The Bailey truss was designed by the British in 1940–1941 for military uses during World War II. A short selection of prefabricated modular components could be easily and speedily combined on land in various configurations to adapt to the needs at the site and allow rapid deployment of completed trusses. In the image, note the use of pairs of doubled trusses to adapt to the span and load requirements. In other applications the trusses may be stacked vertically, and doubled as necessary.

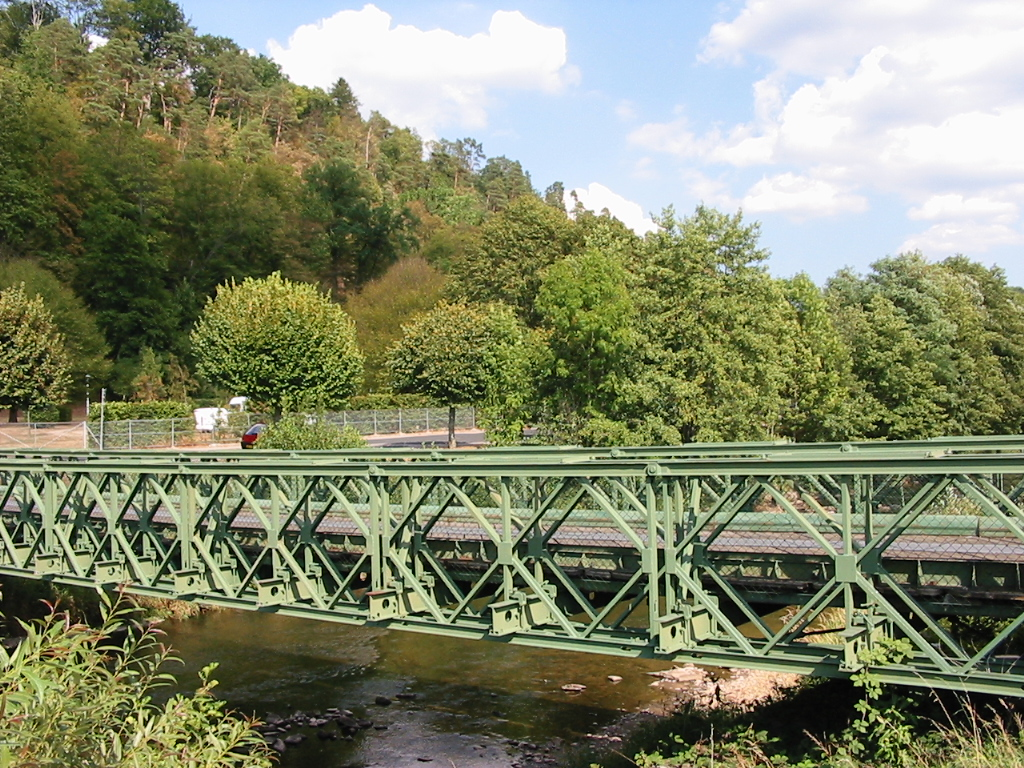
Bailey truss over the Meurthe River in France

=== Baltimore truss ===

The Baltimore truss is a subclass of the Pratt truss. A Baltimore truss has additional bracing in the lower section of the truss to prevent buckling in the compression members and to control deflection. It is mainly used for rail bridges, showing off a simple and very strong design. In the Pratt truss the intersection of the verticals and the lower horizontal tension members are used to anchor the supports for the short-span girders under the tracks (among other things). With the Baltimore truss, there are almost twice as many points for this to happen because the short verticals will also be used to anchor the supports. Thus the short-span girders can be made lighter because their span is shorter. A good example of the Baltimore truss is the Amtrak Old Saybrook – Old Lyme Bridge in Connecticut, United States.

=== Bollman truss ===
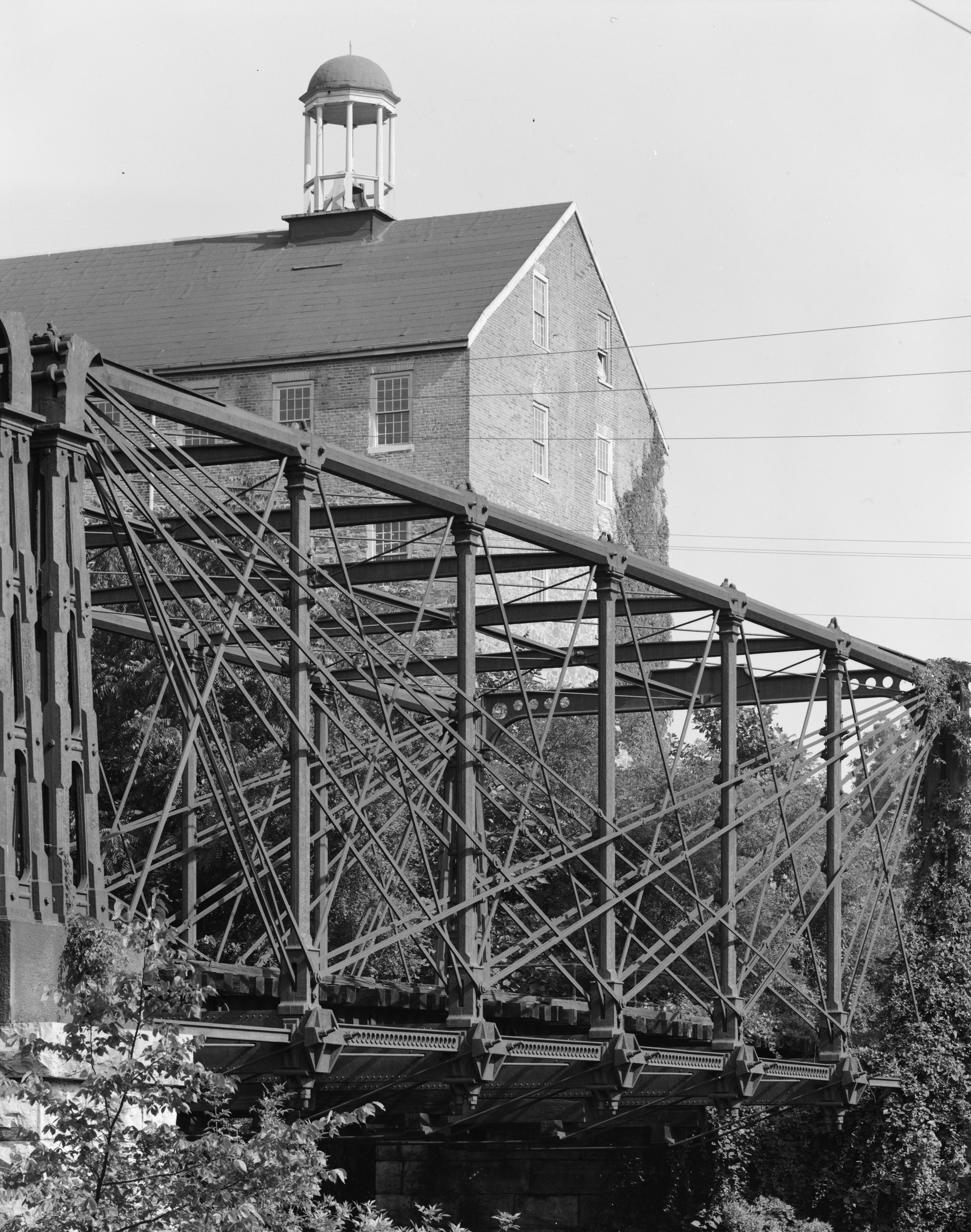
A Bollman truss in Savage, Maryland; built in 1869, it was moved to Savage in 1887 and has been in continuous use since as a pedestrian bridge. 39°8′5.42″N 76°49′30.33″W

The Bollman Truss Railroad Bridge at Savage, Maryland, United States is the only surviving example of a revolutionary design in the history of American bridge engineering. The type was named after its inventor, Wendel Bollman, a self-educated Baltimore engineer. It was the first successful all-metal bridge design (patented in 1852) to be adopted and consistently used on a railroad. The design employs wrought iron tension members and cast iron compression members. The use of multiple independent tension elements reduces the likelihood of catastrophic failure. The structure was also easy to assemble.

Wells Creek Bollman Bridge is the only other bridge designed by Wendel Bollman still in existence, but it is a Warren truss configuration.

=== Bowstring truss ===
Bowstring truss

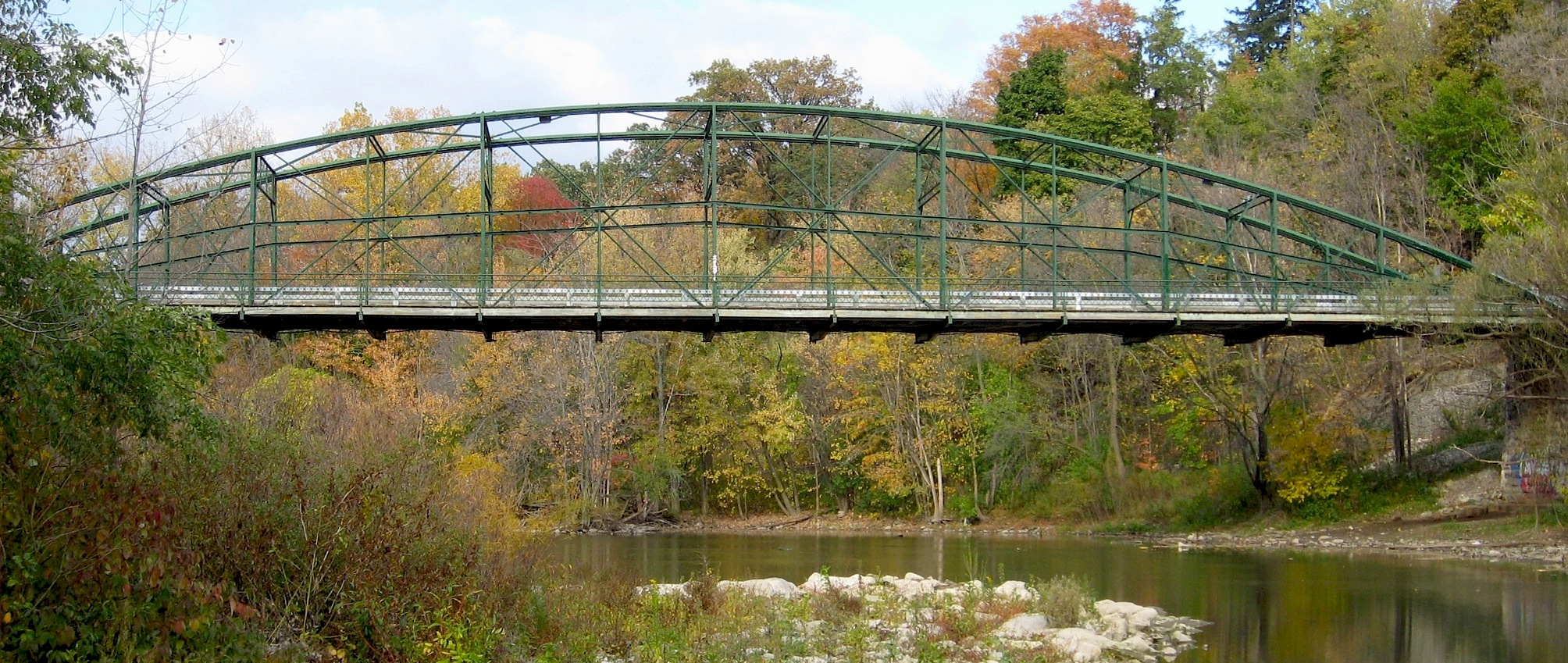
A bowstring truss bridge, in London, Ontario, Canada

The bowstring truss bridge was patented in 1841 by Squire Whipple. While similar in appearance to a tied-arch bridge, a bowstring truss has diagonal load-bearing members: these diagonals result in a structure that more closely matches a Parker truss or Pratt truss than a true arch.

=== Brown truss ===
Brown truss

In the Brown truss all vertical elements are under tension, with exception of the end posts. This type of truss is particularly suited for timber structures that use iron rods as tension members.

=== Brunel truss ===
See Lenticular truss below.

=== Burr arch truss ===
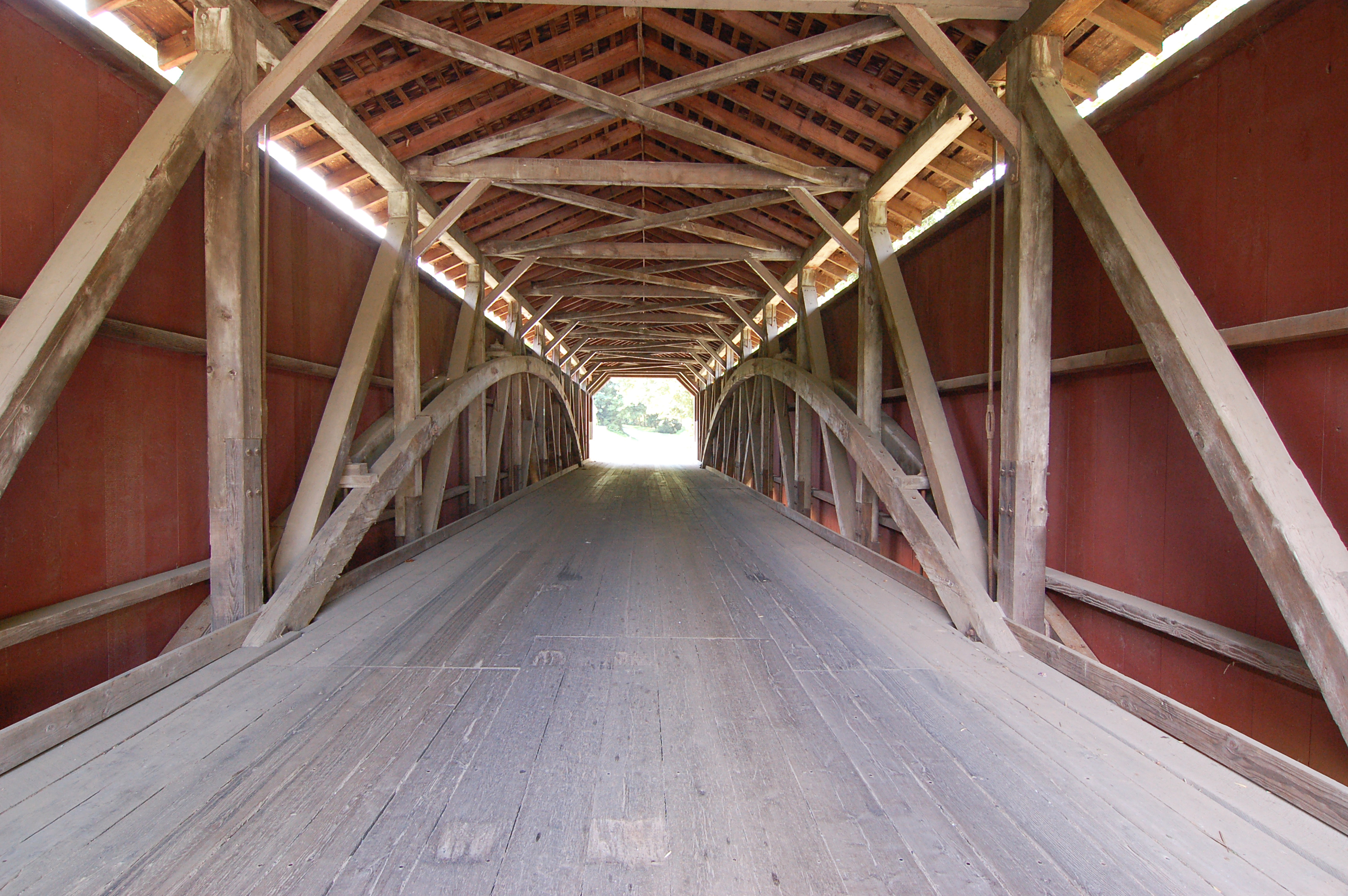
Baumgardener's Covered Bridge, a Burr Arch Truss in Lancaster County, Pennsylvania

This combines an arch with a truss to form a structure both strong and rigid.

=== Cantilever truss ===
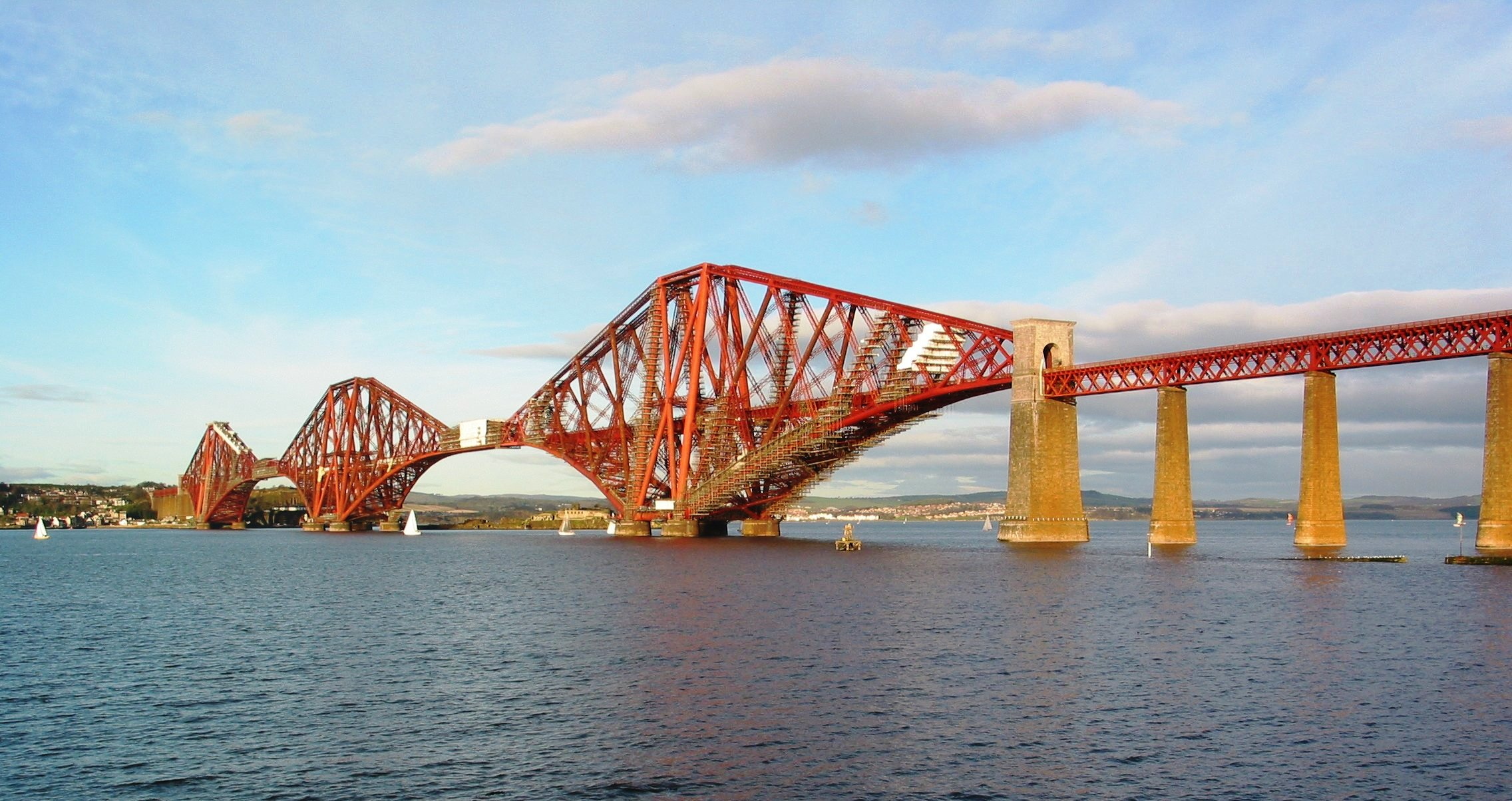
Forth Bridge, crossing the Firth of Forth in eastern Scotland

Most trusses have the lower chord under tension and the upper chord under compression. In a cantilever truss the situation is reversed, at least over a portion of the span. The typical cantilever truss bridge is a "balanced cantilever", which enables the construction to proceed outward from a central vertical spar in each direction. Usually these are built in pairs until the outer sections may be anchored to footings. A central gap, if present, can then be filled by lifting a conventional truss into place or by building it in place using a "traveling support". In another method of construction, one outboard half of each balanced truss is built upon temporary falsework. When the outboard halves are completed and anchored the inboard halves may then be constructed and the center section completed as described above.

=== Fink truss ===
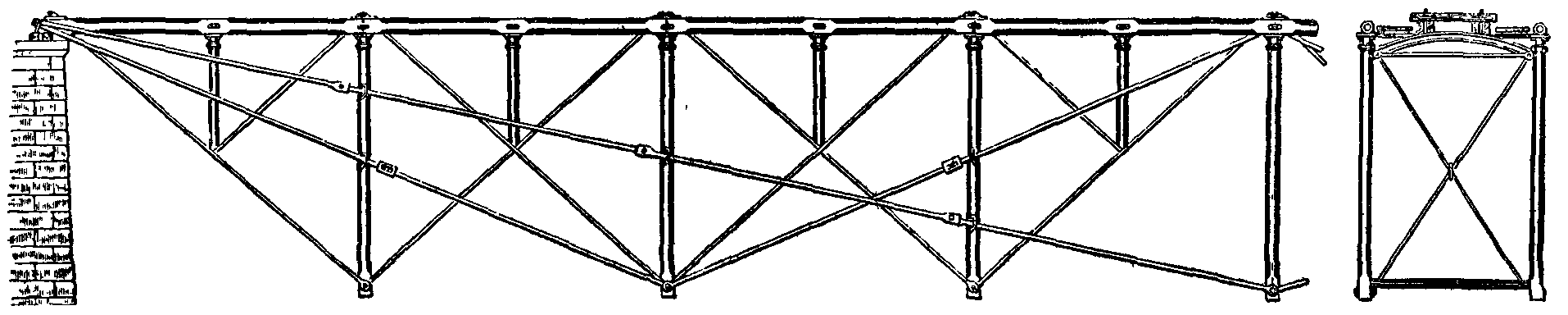
A Fink truss (half span and cross section)

The Fink truss was designed by Albert Fink of Germany in 1854. This type of bridge was popular with the Baltimore and Ohio Railroad. The Appomattox High Bridge on the Norfolk and Western Railway included 21 Fink deck truss spans from 1869 until their replacement in 1886.

There are also inverted Fink truss bridges such as the Moody Pedestrian Bridge in Austin, Texas.

=== Howe truss ===
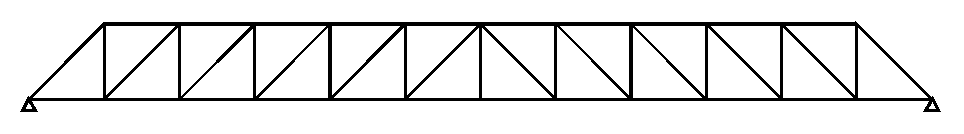
A Howe truss with diagonals under compression under balanced loading

The Howe truss, patented in 1840 by Massachusetts millwright William Howe, includes vertical members and diagonals that slope up towards the center, the opposite of the Pratt truss. In contrast to the Pratt truss, the diagonal web members are in compression and the vertical web members are in tension. Few of these bridges remain standing. Examples include Jay Bridge in Jay, New York; McConnell's Mill Covered Bridge in Slippery Rock Township, Lawrence County, Pennsylvania; Sandy Creek Covered Bridge in Jefferson County, Missouri; and Westham Island Bridge in Delta, British Columbia, Canada.

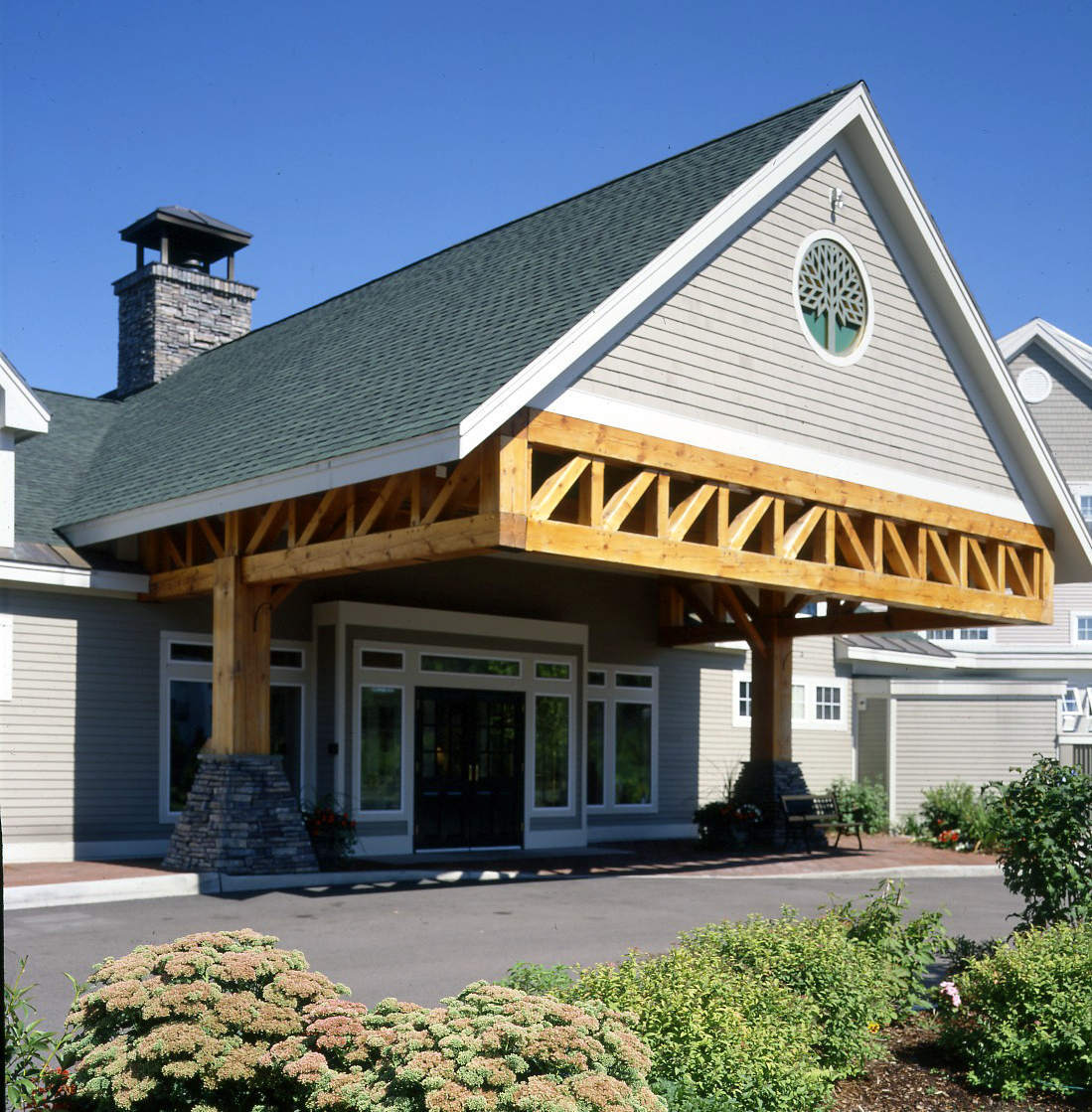
A large timber Howe truss in a commercial building.

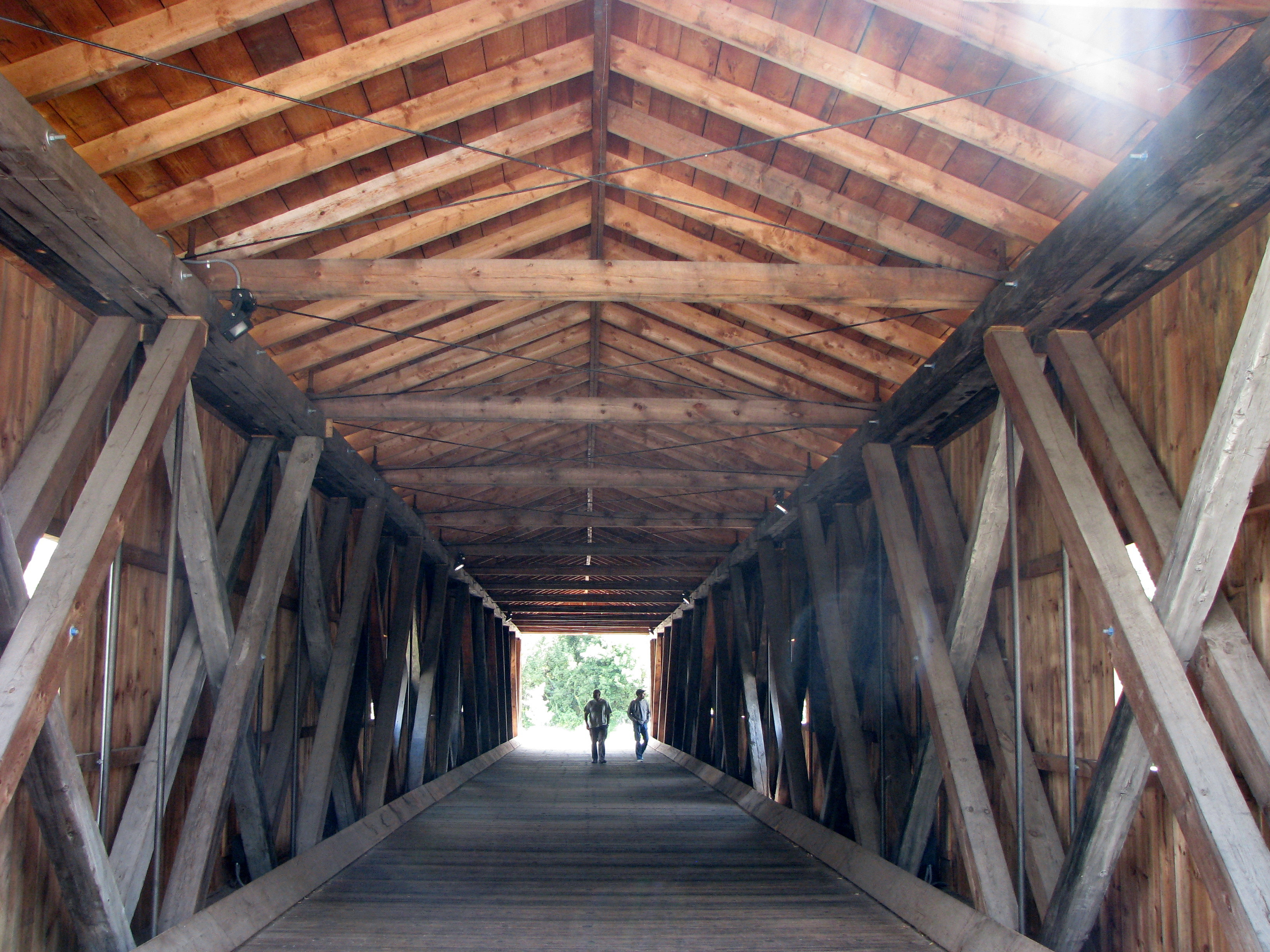
Jay Bridge showing the truss design.

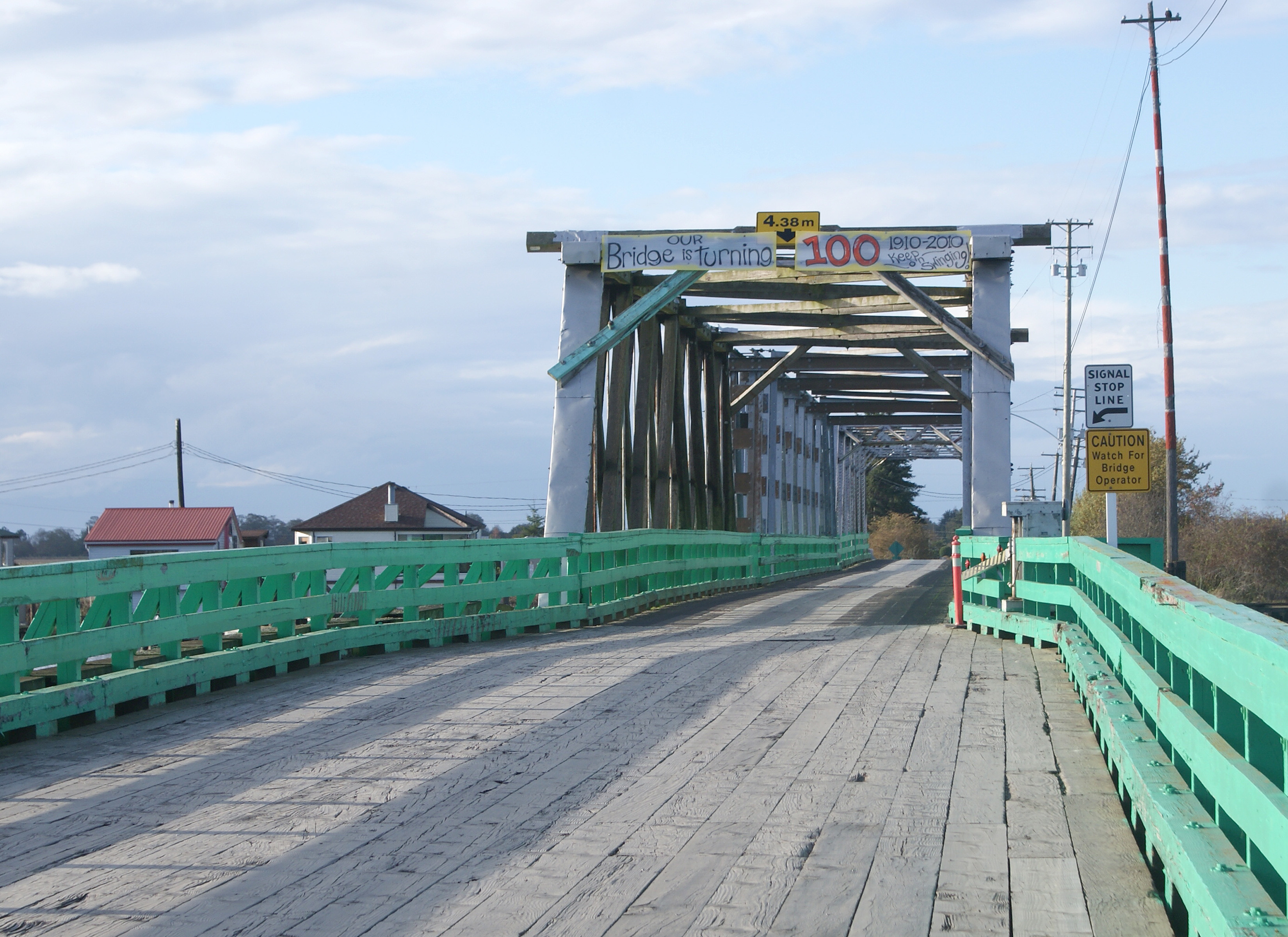
Westham Island Bridge showing its wooden truss design.

=== K-truss ===
K-truss

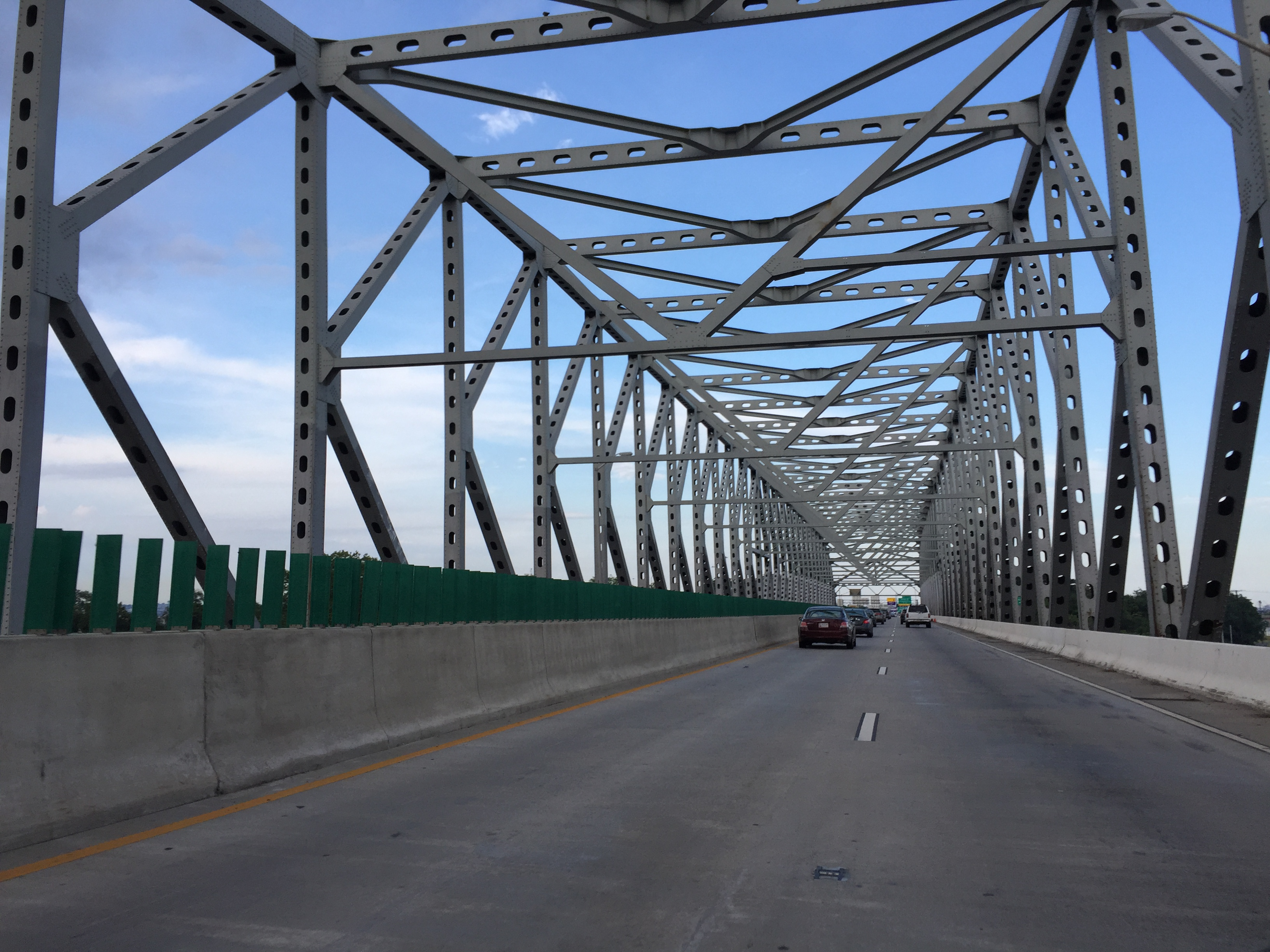
The I-895 K-truss in Baltimore

The K-truss is named after the K formed in each panel by the vertical member and two oblique members. Examples include the Südbrücke rail bridge over the River Rhine, Mainz, Germany, the bridge on I-895 (Baltimore Harbor Tunnel Thruway) in Baltimore, Maryland, the Long–Allen Bridge in Morgan City, Louisiana (Morgan City Bridge) with three 600-foot-long spans, and the Wax Lake Outlet bridge in Calumet, Louisiana

=== Kingpost truss ===
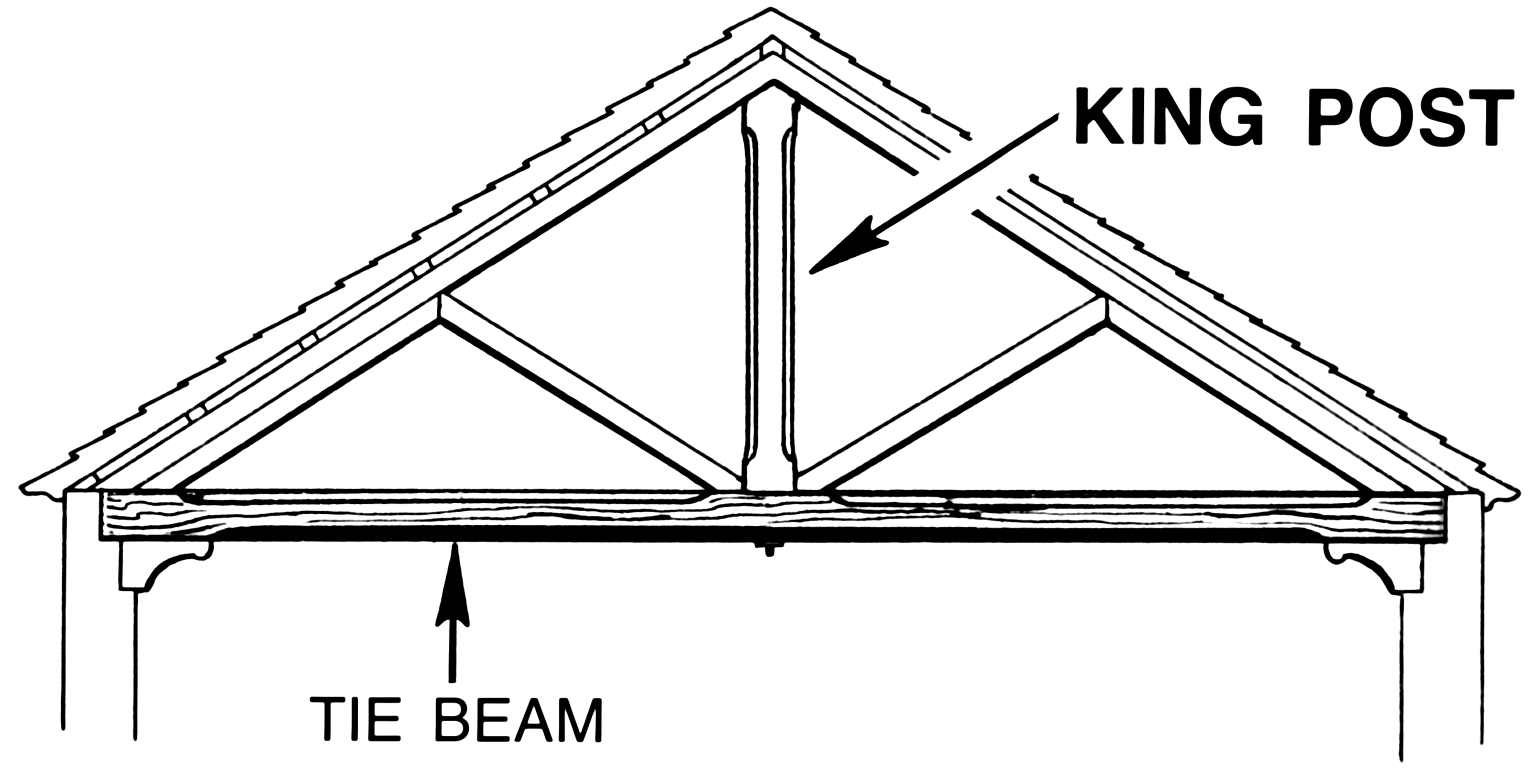
King post truss

One of the simplest truss styles to implement, the king post consists of two angled supports leaning into a common vertical support.

=== Lattice truss (Town's lattice truss) ===
Lattice, or Warren quadrangular truss illustrated

This type of bridge uses a substantial number of lightweight elements, easing the task of construction. Truss elements are usually of wood, iron, or steel.

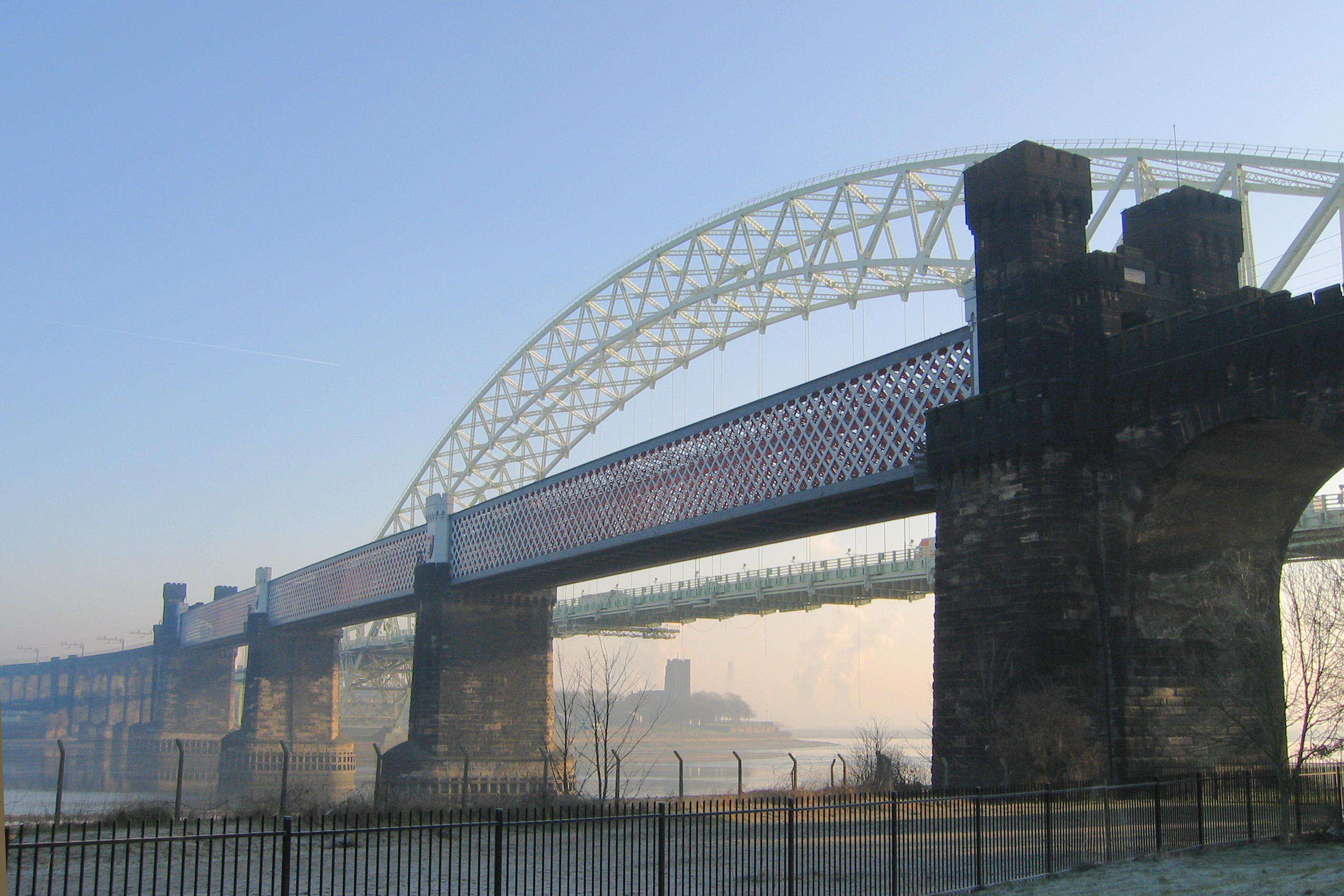
Runcorn Railway Bridge, a lattice truss

=== Lenticular truss ===

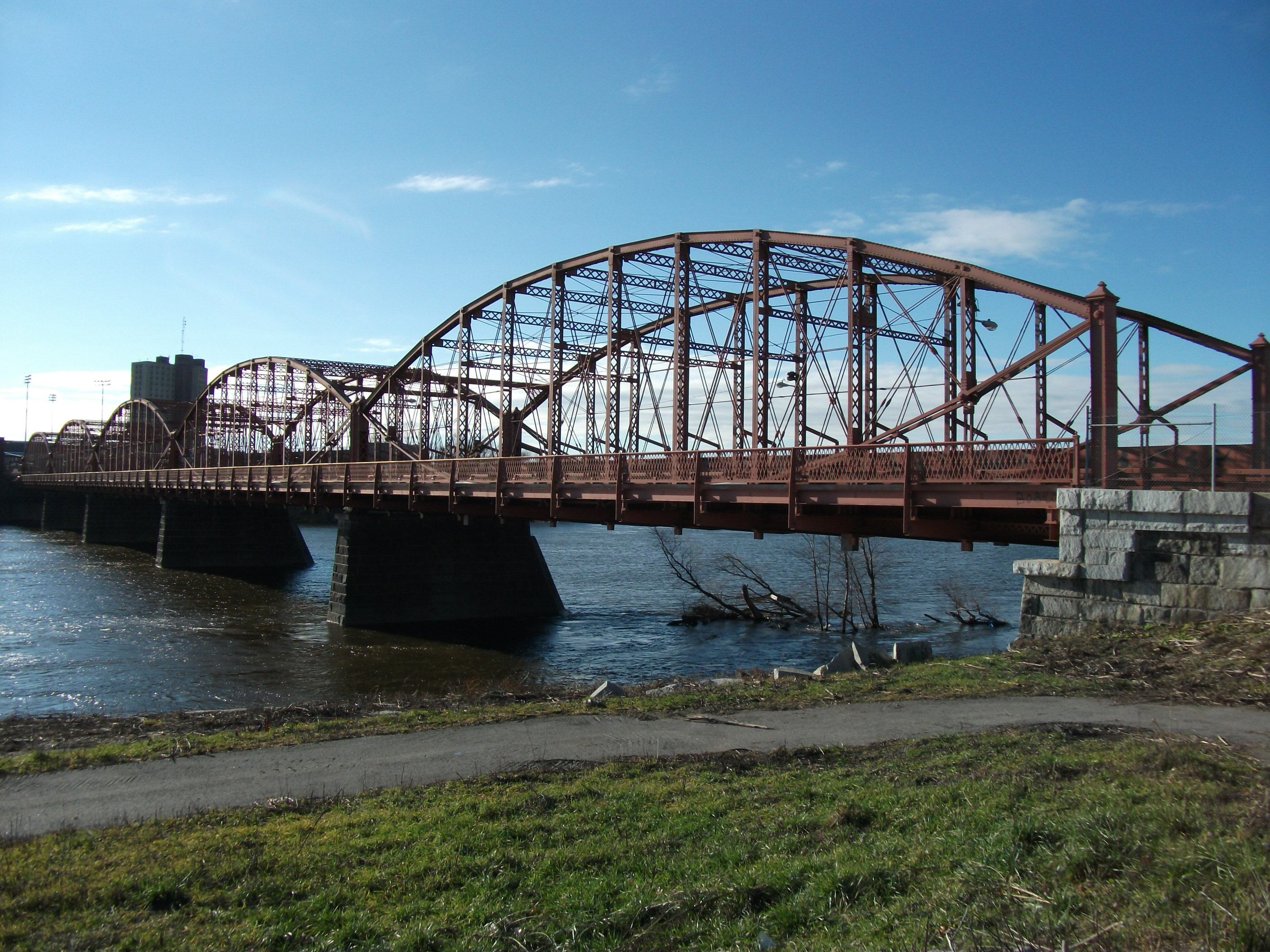
Aiken Street Bridge in Lowell, Massachusetts, built in 1883 by Berlin Iron Bridge Co., is the longest lenticular truss bridge in the United States with five spans, and the second-oldest lenticular truss bridge in Massachusetts.

A lenticular truss bridge includes a lens-shape truss, with trusses between an upper chord functioning as an arch that curves up and then down to end points, and a lower chord (functioning as a suspension cable) that curves down and then up to meet at the same end points. Where the arches extend above and below the roadbed, it is called a lenticular pony truss bridge. The Pauli truss bridge is a specific variant of the lenticular truss, but the terms are not interchangeable.

One type of lenticular truss consists of arcuate upper compression chords and lower eyebar chain tension links. Brunel's Royal Albert Bridge over the River Tamar between Devon and Cornwall uses a single tubular upper chord. As the horizontal tension and compression forces are balanced these horizontal forces are not transferred to the supporting pylons (as is the case with most arch types). This in turn enables the truss to be fabricated on the ground and then to be raised by jacking as supporting masonry pylons are constructed. This truss has been used in the construction of a stadium, with the upper chords of parallel trusses supporting a roof that may be rolled back. The Smithfield Street Bridge in Pittsburgh, Pennsylvania, is another example of this type.

An example of a lenticular pony truss bridge that uses regular spans of iron is the Turn-of-River Bridge designed and manufactured by the Berlin Iron Bridge Co.

The Pauli truss is a variant of the lenticular truss, "with the top chord carefully shaped so that it has a constant force along the entire length of the truss." It is named after Friedrich Augustus von Pauli, whose 1857 railway bridge (the Großhesseloher Brücke) spanned the Isar near Munich. (See also Grosshesselohe Isartal station.) The term Pauli truss is not interchangeable with the term lenticular truss and, according to Thomas Boothby, the casual use of the term has clouded the literature.

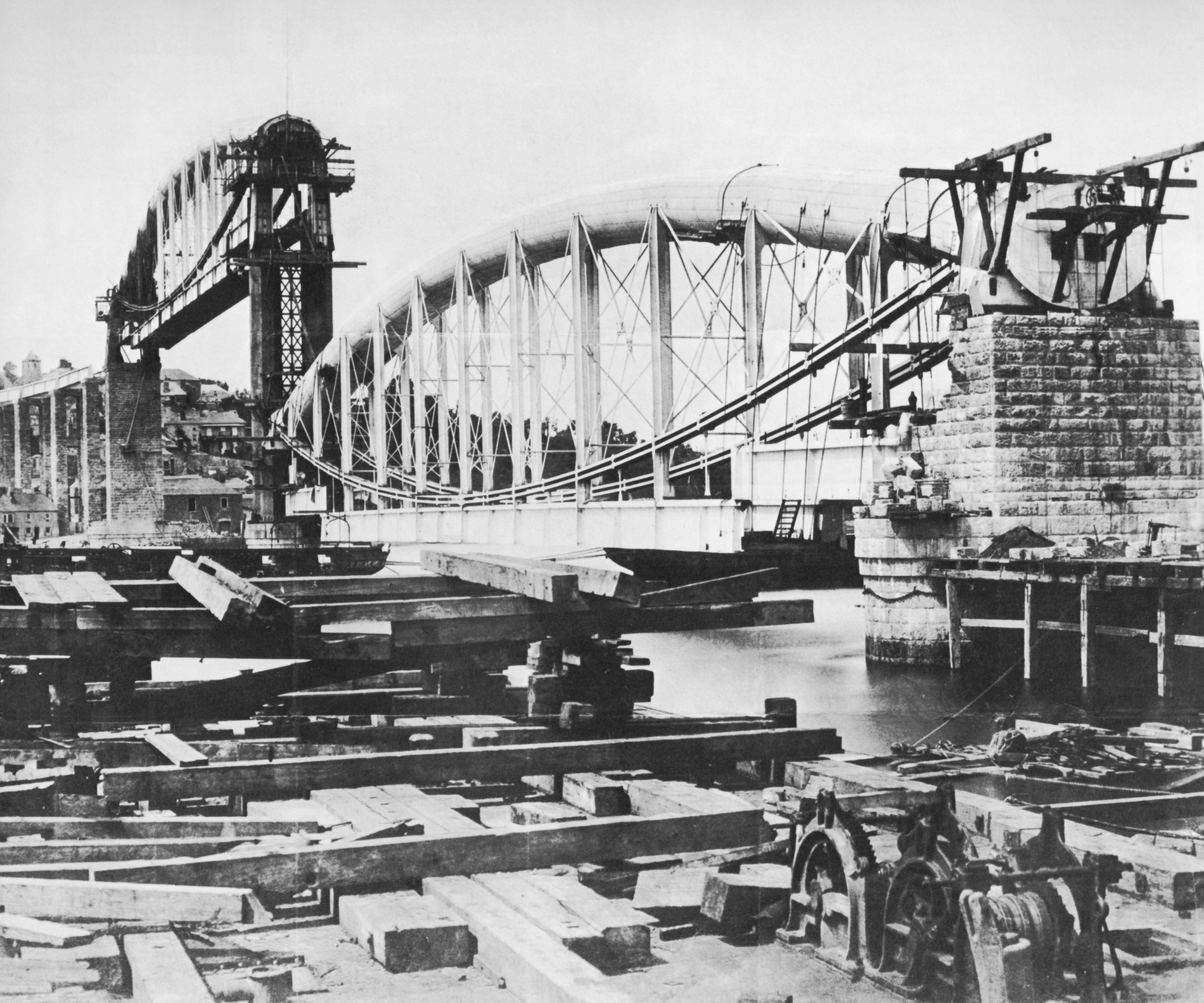
Royal Albert Bridge under construction in 1859

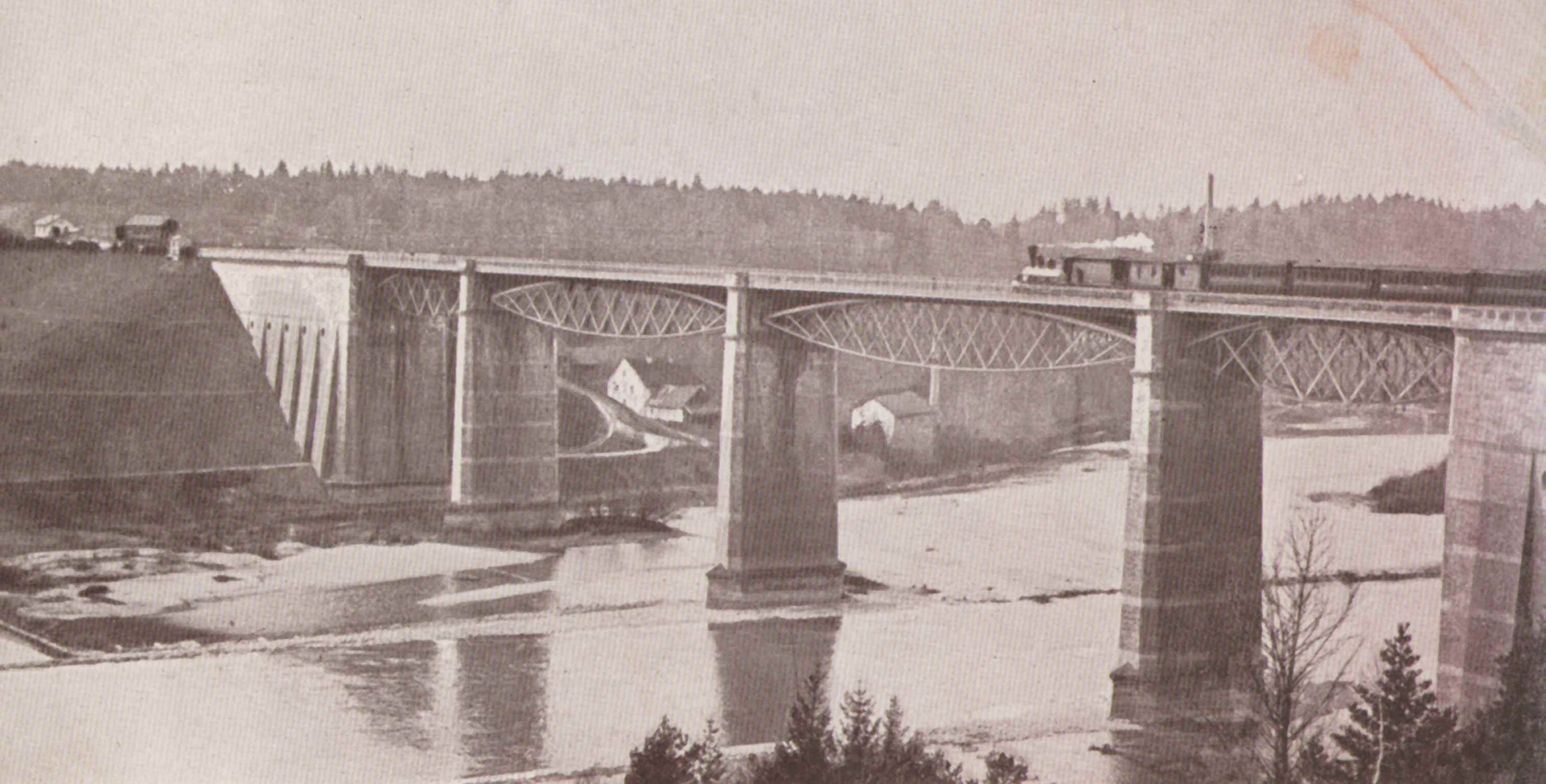
The old Großhesselohe bridge before 1905, designed by Friedrich von Pauli

=== Long truss ===
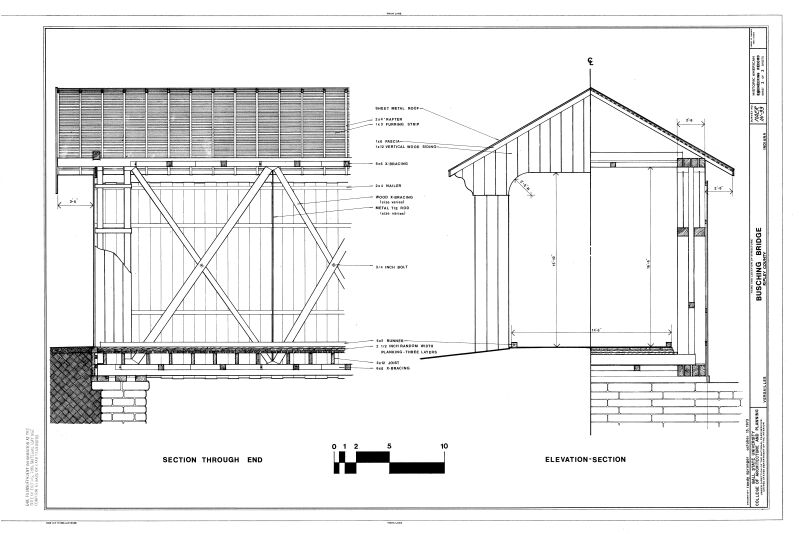
HAER diagram of a Long truss

The Long truss was patented in 1830 by Stephen Harriman Long. It was one of the earliest American parallel-chord timber-truss systems to incorporate wedge-tightened counterbracing and the deliberate proportioning of members according to calculated stresses rather than uniform empirical sizing.

The truss consists of parallel timber chords, vertical posts, and diagonal braces tightened into compression by adjustable wedges at the joints. Unlike the later Howe truss, which employed iron vertical tension rods and mechanically defined pinned connections, the Long truss relied entirely on timber members and force transfer through bearing at shouldered joints.

Historically, the Long truss represents a transitional stage in American bridge engineering between empirically proportioned timber systems such as the Town lattice truss and the hybrid timber–iron trusses that emerged in the 1840s. Surviving examples are documented by the Historic American Engineering Record and remain an important part of early covered-bridge preservation scholarship.

=== Parker (camelback) truss ===

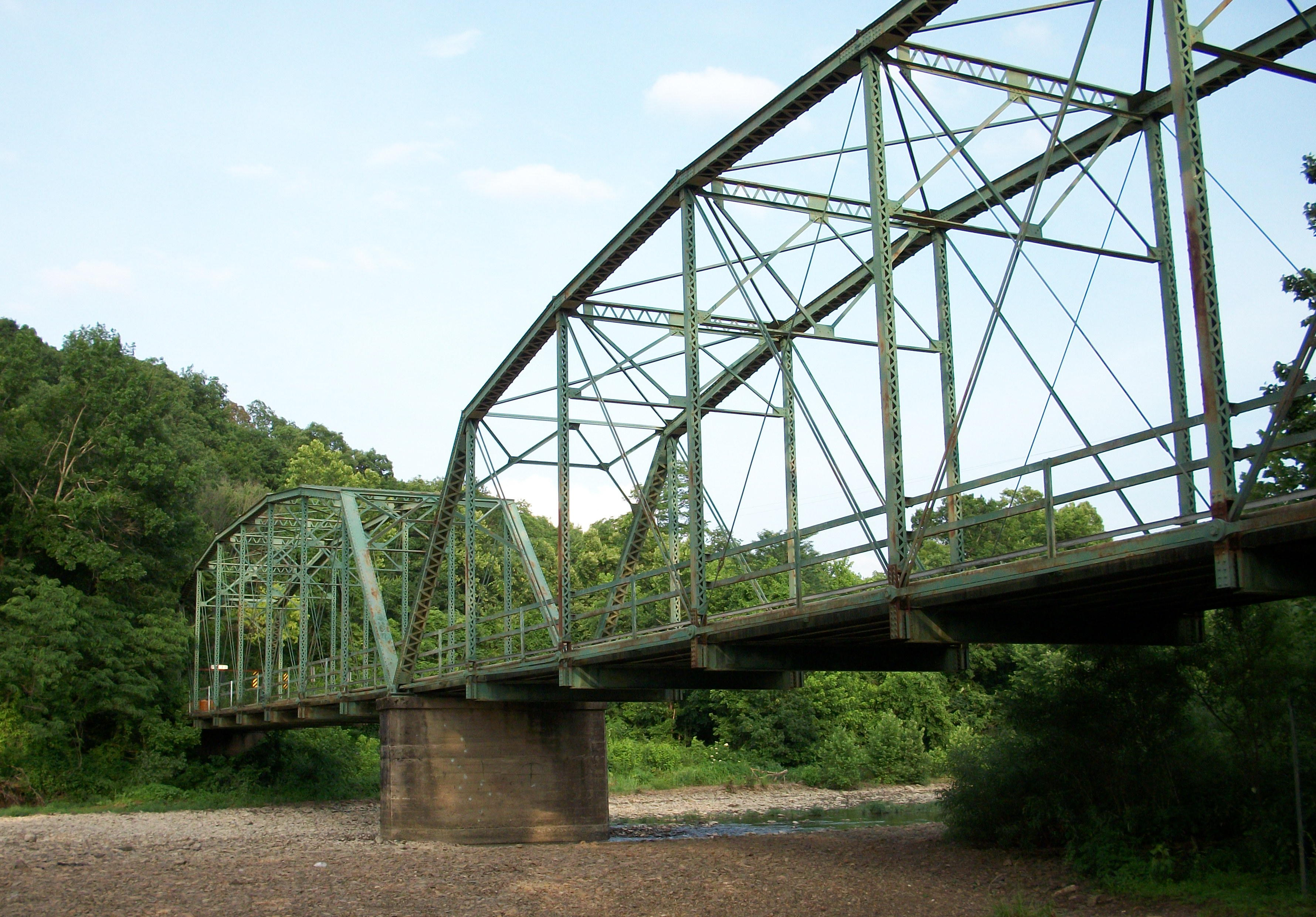
Woolsey Bridge, a Parker camelback truss

A Parker truss bridge is a Pratt truss design with a polygonal upper chord. A "camelback" is a subset of the Parker type, where the upper chord consists of exactly five segments. An example of a Parker truss is the Traffic Bridge in Saskatoon, Canada. An example of a camelback truss is the Woolsey Bridge near Woolsey, Arkansas.

=== Partridge truss ===
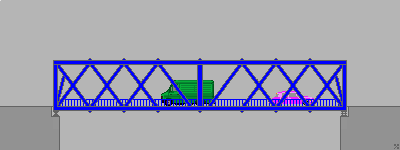
Partridge truss design

Designed and patented in 1872 by Reuben Partridge, after local bridge designs proved ineffective against road traffic and heavy rains. It became the standard for covered bridges built in central Ohio in the late 1800s and early 1900s.

=== Pegram truss ===
Pegram truss

The Pegram truss is a hybrid between the Warren and Parker trusses where the upper chords are all of equal length and the lower chords are longer than the corresponding upper chord. Because of the difference in upper and lower chord length, each panel is not square. The members which would be vertical in a Parker truss vary from near vertical in the center of the span to diagonal near each end, similar to a Warren truss. George H. Pegram, while the chief engineer of Edge Moor Iron Company in Wilmington, Delaware, patented this truss design in 1885.

The Pegram truss consists of a Parker type design with the vertical posts leaning towards the center at an angle between 60 and 75°. The variable post angle and constant chord length allowed steel in existing bridges to be recycled into a new span using the Pegram truss design. This design also facilitated reassembly and permitted a bridge to be adjusted to fit different span lengths. There are twelve known remaining Pegram span bridges in the United States with seven in Idaho, two in Kansas, and one each in California, Washington, and Utah.

=== Pennsylvania (Petit) truss ===

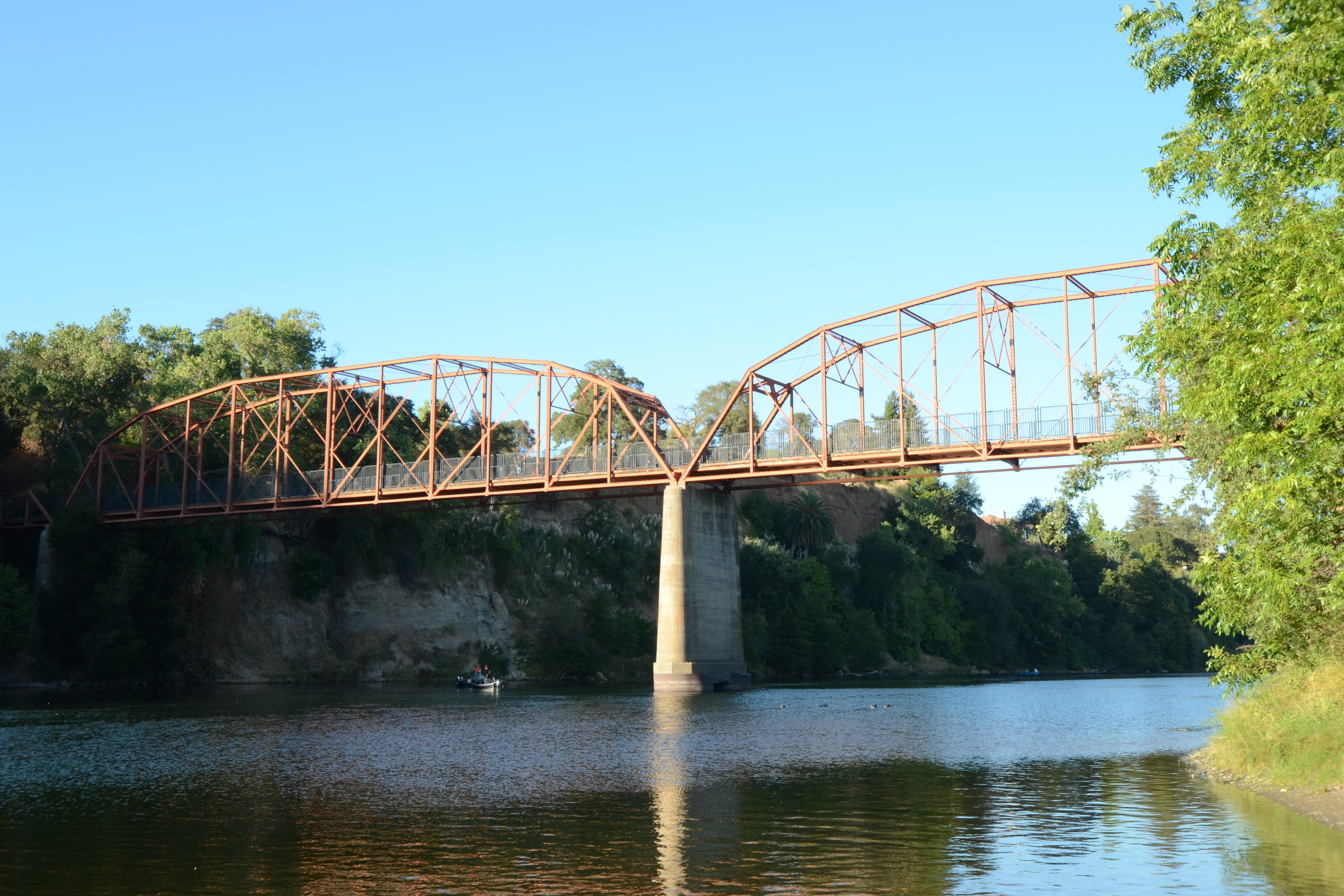
The Fair Oaks Bridge is an example of Pennsylvania Petit truss bridge.

The Pennsylvania (Petit) truss is a variation on the Pratt truss. The Pratt truss includes braced diagonal members in all panels; the Pennsylvania truss adds to this design half-length struts or ties in the top, bottom, or both parts of the panels. It is named after the Pennsylvania Railroad, which pioneered this design. It was once used for hundreds of bridges in the United States, but fell out of favor in the 1930s and very few examples of this design remain. Examples of this truss type include the Lower Trenton Bridge in Trenton, New Jersey, the Fort Wayne Street Bridge in Goshen, Indiana, the Schell Bridge in Northfield, Massachusetts, the Inclined Plane Bridge in Johnstown, Pennsylvania, the Easton–Phillipsburg Toll Bridge in Easton, Pennsylvania, the Boston and Maine Connecticut River Rail Bridge in Brattleboro, Vermont, the Metropolis Bridge in Metropolis, Illinois, and the Healdsburg Memorial Bridge in Healdsburg, California.

=== Post truss ===
A Post truss

A Post truss is a hybrid between a Warren truss and a double-intersection Pratt truss. Invented in 1863 by Simeon S. Post, it is occasionally referred to as a Post patent truss although he never received a patent for it. The Ponakin Bridge and the Bell Ford Bridge are two examples of this truss.

=== Pratt truss ===
A Pratt truss

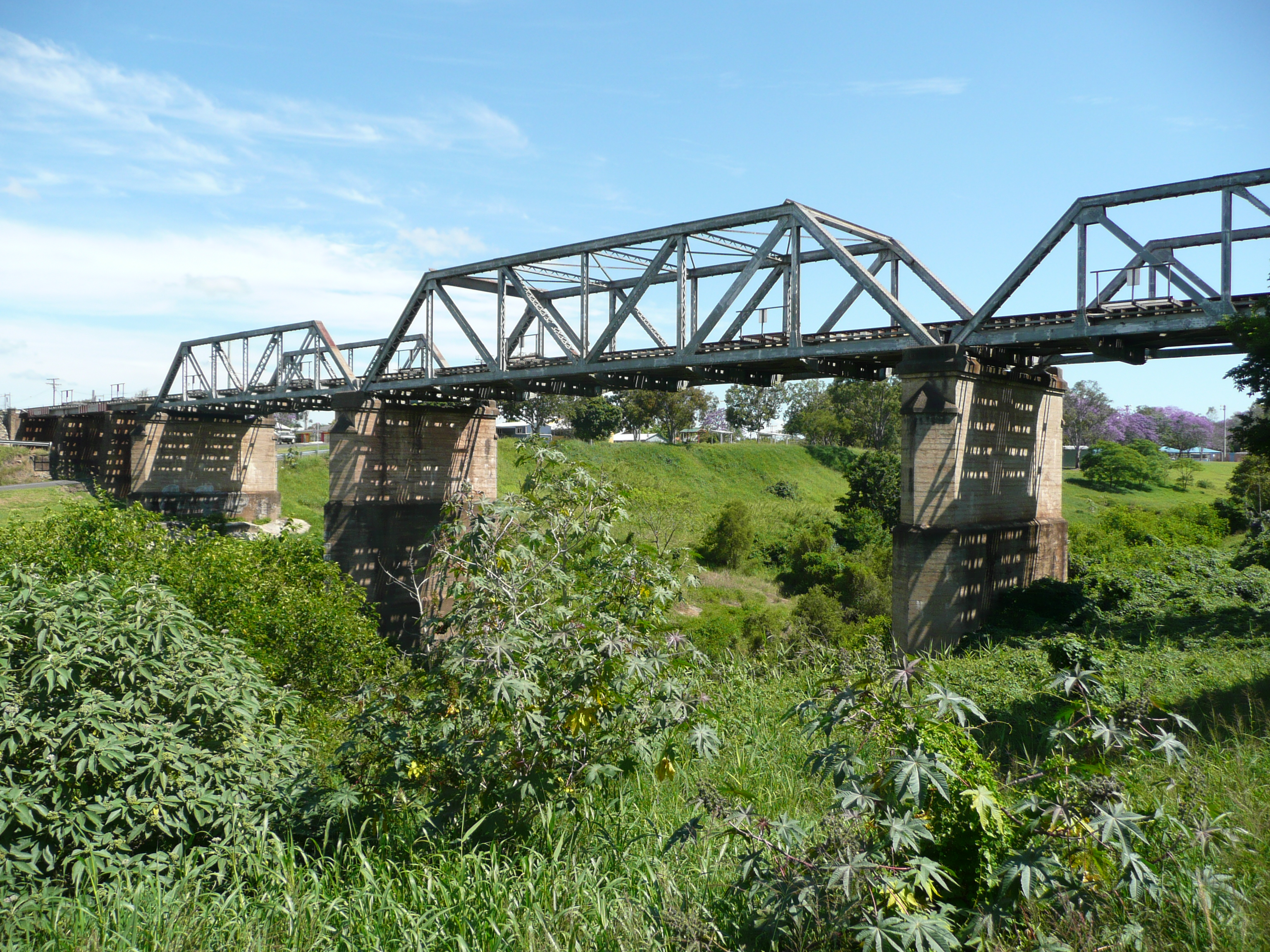
Gatton Railway Bridge showing the Pratt truss design

A Pratt truss includes vertical members and diagonals that slope down towards the center, the opposite of the Howe truss. The interior diagonals are under tension under balanced loading and vertical elements under compression. If pure tension elements (such as eyebars) are used in the diagonals, then crossing elements may be needed near the center to accept concentrated live loads as they traverse the span. It can be subdivided, creating Y- and K-shaped patterns. The Pratt truss was invented in 1844 by Thomas and Caleb Pratt. This truss is practical for use with spans up to 250 feet (76 m) and was a common configuration for railroad bridges as truss bridges moved from wood to metal. They are statically determinate bridges, which lend themselves well to long spans. They were common in the United States between 1844 and the early 20th century.

Examples of Pratt truss bridges are the Governor's Bridge in Maryland; the Hayden RR Bridge in Springfield, Oregon, built in 1882; the Dearborn River High Bridge near Augusta, Montana, built in 1897; and the Fair Oaks Bridge in Fair Oaks, California, built 1907–09.

The Scenic Bridge near Tarkio, Montana, is an example of a Pratt deck truss bridge, where the roadway is on top of the truss.

=== Queenpost truss ===
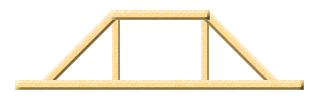
A Queen post truss

The queenpost truss, sometimes called "queen post" or queenspost, is similar to a king post truss in that the outer supports are angled towards the center of the structure. The primary difference is the horizontal extension at the center which relies on beam action to provide mechanical stability. This truss style is only suitable for relatively short spans.

=== Smith truss ===
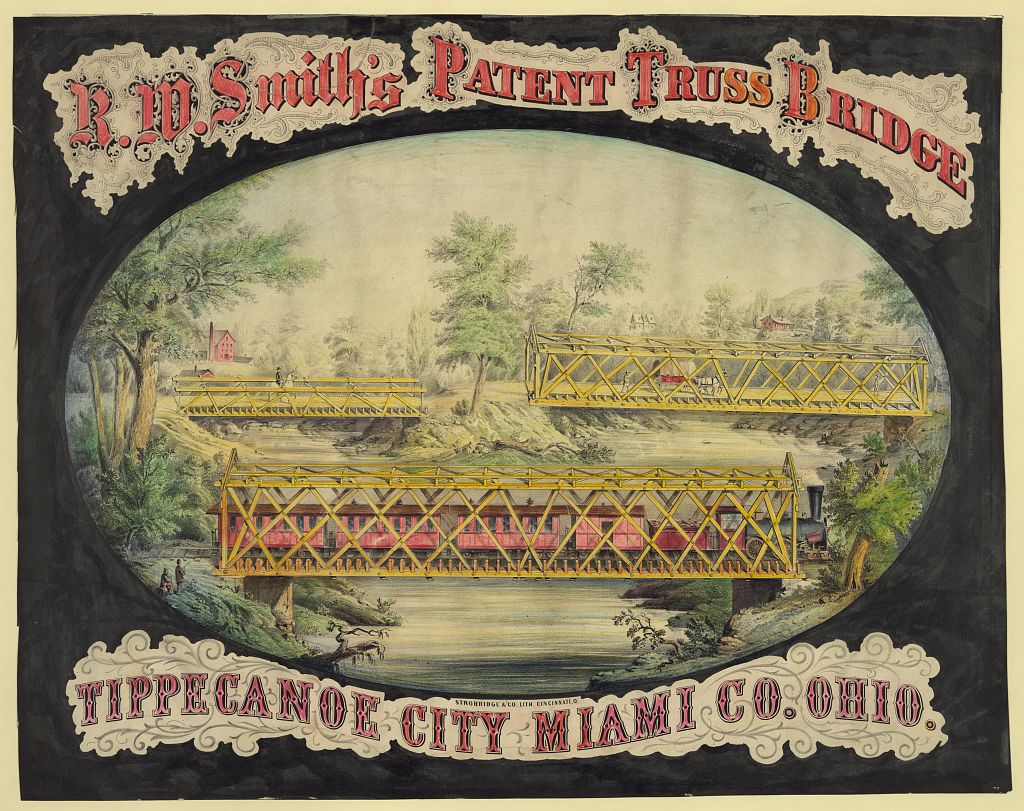
Smith truss

The Smith truss, patented by Robert W Smith on July 16, 1867, has mostly diagonal criss-crossed supports. Smith's company used many variations of this pattern in the wooden covered bridges it built.

The Pacific Bridge Company of Alameda, California was an early manufacturer of bridge kits based on the Smith design. The pre-manufactured kits were designed to be assembled on-site, and most were covered. One of the truss-bridge kits, sold in 1871 to the California Powder Works near Santa Cruz, California, remains in use.

While most all of the bridges built in the 19th century in the Jackson County, Ohio, area used the Smith truss design, the Johnson Road Covered Bridge is the last known surviving example in the state.

=== Thacher truss ===
A Thacher truss bridge

The Thacher truss combines some of the characteristics of a Pratt truss with diagonals under tension and of a Howe truss with diagonals under compression, which is rare.

=== Truss arch ===
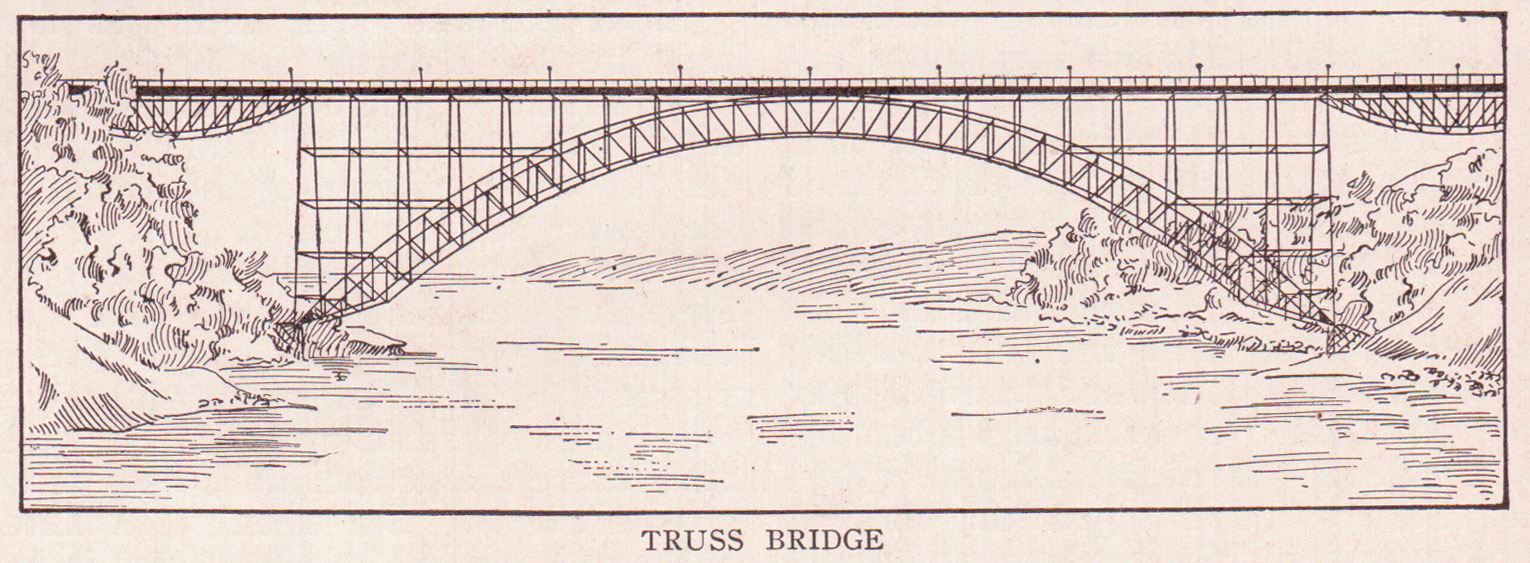
Truss arch bridge

A truss arch may contain all horizontal forces within the arch itself, or alternatively may be either a thrust arch consisting of a truss, or of two arcuate sections pinned at the apex. The latter form is common when the bridge is constructed as cantilever segments from each side as in the Navajo Bridge.

=== Vierendeel truss ===
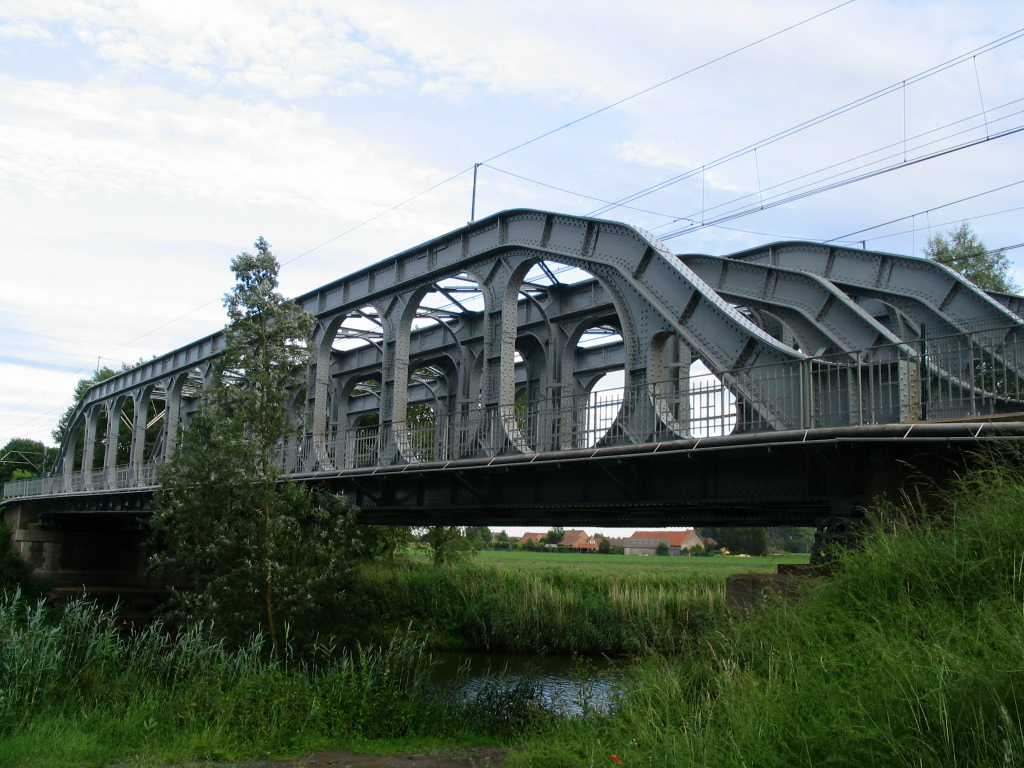
A Vierendeel bridge

The Vierendeel truss, unlike common pin-jointed trusses, imposes significant bending forces upon its members—but this in turn allows the elimination of many diagonal elements. It is a structure where the members are not triangulated but form rectangular openings, and is a frame with fixed joints that are capable of transferring and resisting bending moments. While rare as a bridge type due to higher costs compared to a triangulated truss, it is commonly employed in modern building construction as it allows the resolution of gross shear forces against the frame elements while retaining rectangular openings between columns. This is advantageous both in allowing flexibility in the use of the building space and freedom in selection of the building's outer curtain wall, which affects both interior and exterior styling aspects.

=== Waddell truss ===
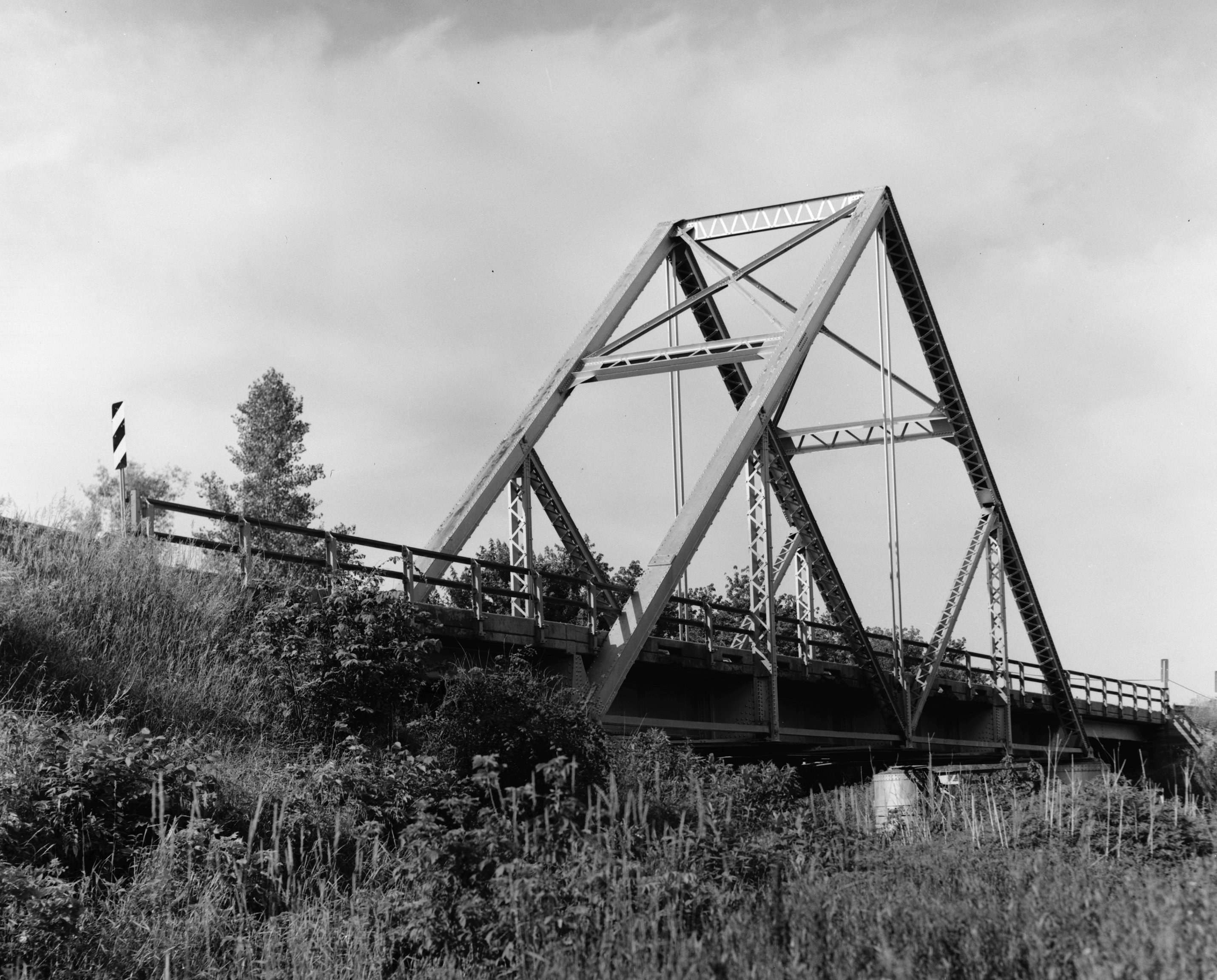
Waddell "A" truss bridge, assembled in 1898

Patented 1894 (U.S. patent 529,220); its simplicity eases erection at the site. It was intended to be used as a railroad bridge.

One example was the Waddell "A" Truss Bridge in Parkville, Missouri.

=== Warren truss ===
A Warren truss

The Warren truss was patented in 1848 by James Warren and Willoughby Theobald Monzani, and consists of longitudinal members joined only by angled cross-members, forming alternately inverted equilateral triangle-shaped spaces along its length, ensuring that no individual strut, beam, or tie is subject to bending or torsional straining forces, but only to tension or compression. Loads on the diagonals alternate between compression and tension approaching the center, with no vertical elements, while elements near the center must support both tension and compression in response to live loads. This configuration combines strength with economy of materials and can therefore be relatively light. The girders being of equal length, it is ideal for use in prefabricated modular bridges. It is an improvement over the Neville truss which uses a spacing configuration of isosceles triangles.

=== Whipple truss ===

A Whipple truss, named after its inventor Squire Whipple, is usually considered a subclass of the Pratt truss because the diagonal members are designed to work in tension. The main characteristic of a Whipple truss is that the tension members are elongated, usually thin, and at a shallow angle, and cross two or more bays (rectangular sections defined by the vertical members). An example of the double-intersection Whipple truss is Bridge L-158 in Golden's Bridge, New York.

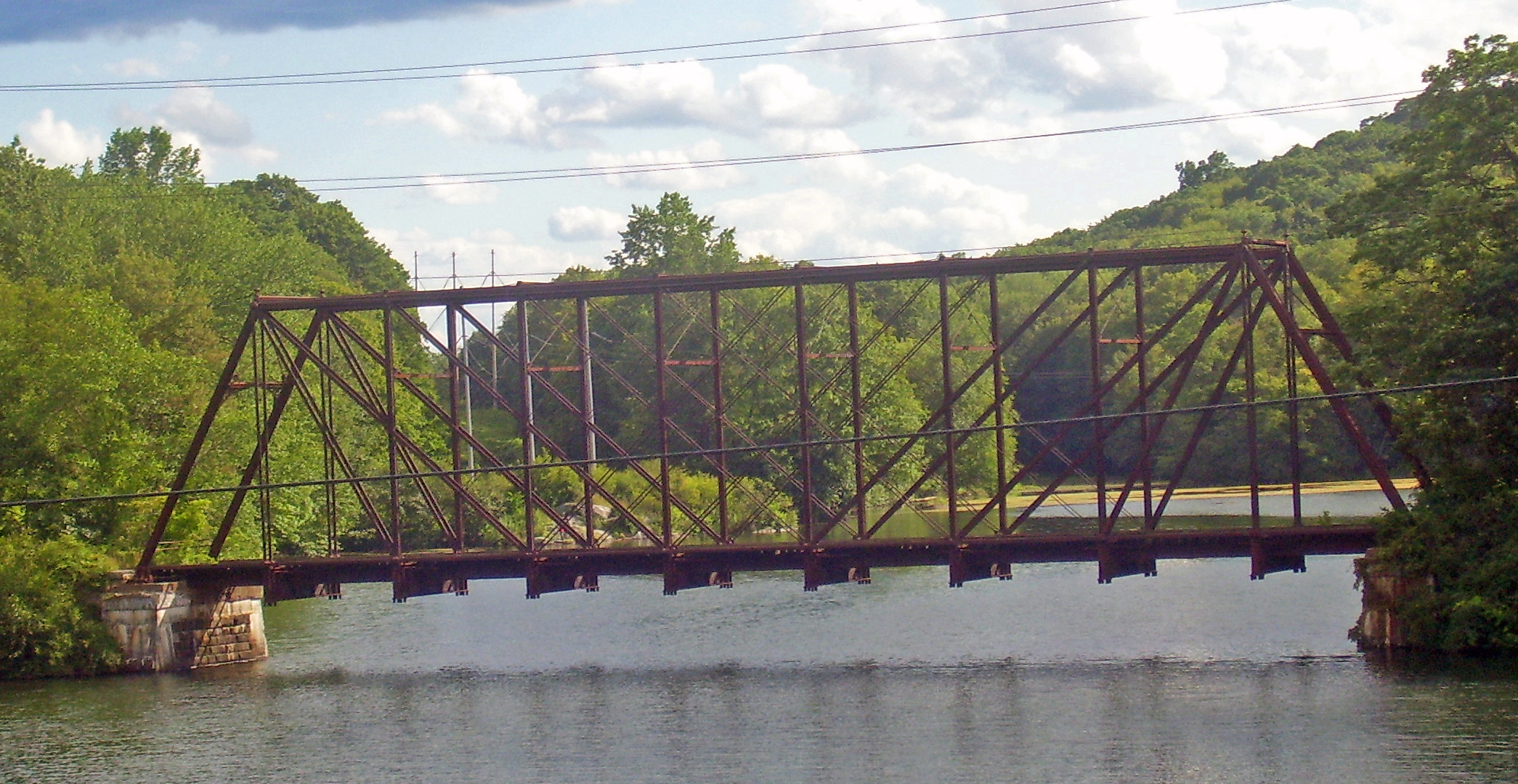
Bridge L-158, a double-intersection Whipple rail truss over the Muscoot Reservoir in Golden's Bridge, New York

=== Wichert truss ===
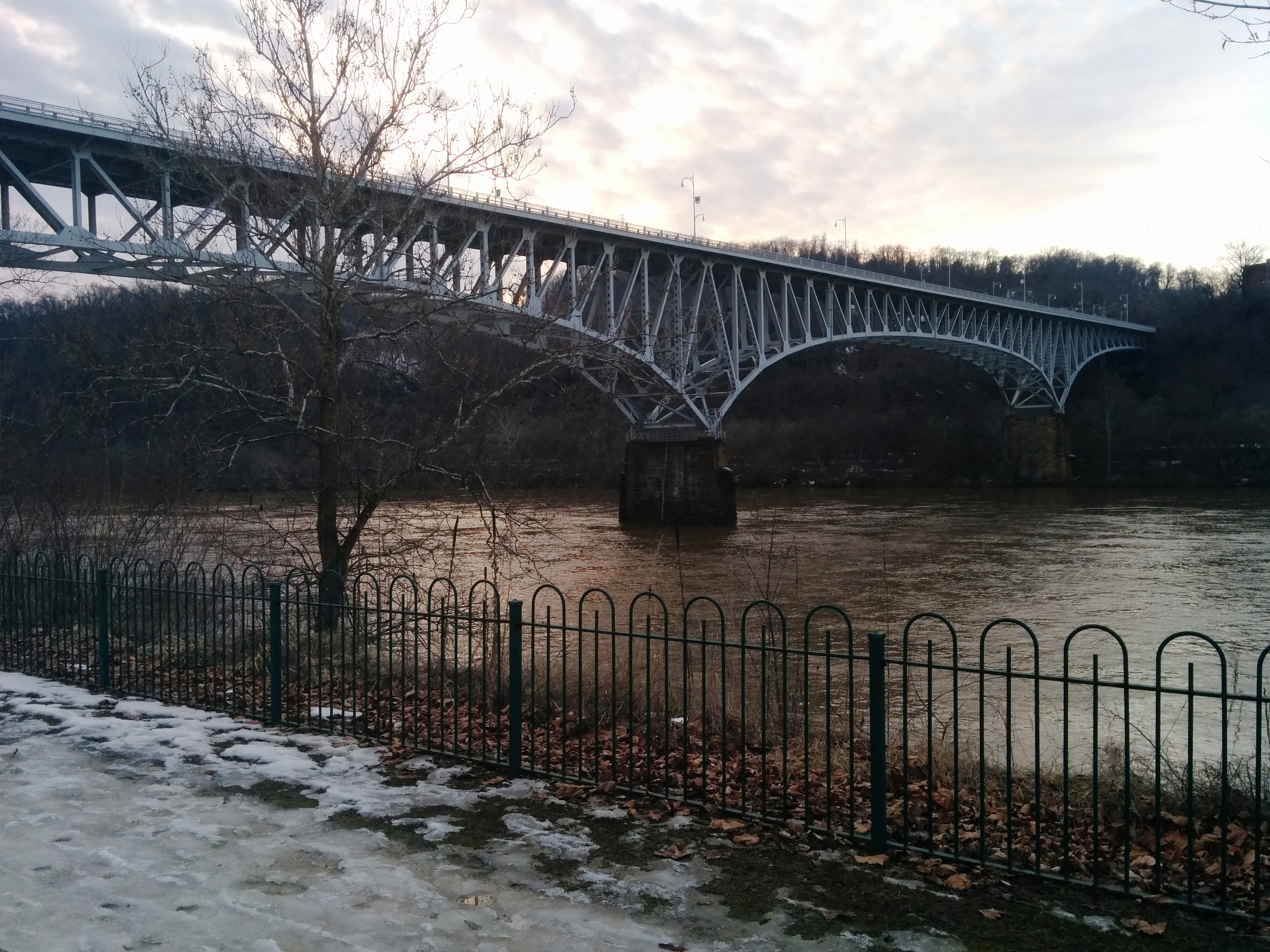
Homestead Grays Bridge over the Monongahela River in Pittsburgh

The Wichert truss is a modified type of continuous truss which is statically determinate and helps avoid some of the other shortcomings of continuous trusses. It was patented in 1930 by Pittsburgh-based civil engineer Edward Martin Wichert (1883–1955).

The defining feature of this truss type is a hinged kite-shaped section above each intermediate support. Only about ten Wichert truss bridges were ever built, mostly in Pennsylvania and Maryland. Of these, one of the best known is the Homestead Grays Bridge in Pittsburgh.

== Video ==
Driving across a truss bridge in Lane County, Oregon

Driving across a truss bridge: The video shows the roadway perspective of a through truss bridge over the Willamette River in Harrisburg, Oregon. The bridge features three simply supported Parker Truss spans.
