= Tuscarora Creek railroad bridge =

Tuscarora Creek (Monocacy River) bridge
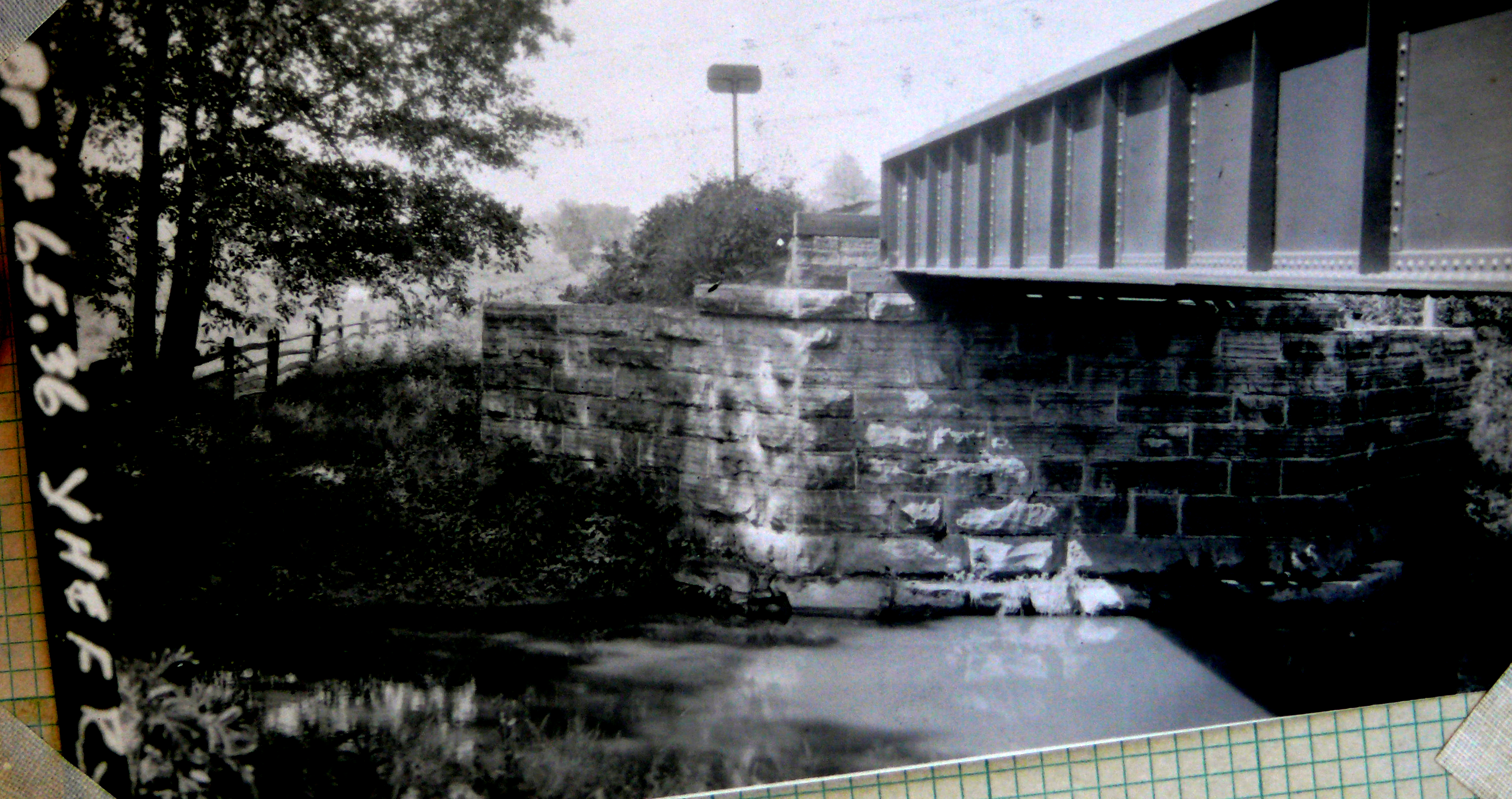
- Tuscarora Creek (Monocacy River) bridge (1915 ICC photo)
- Coordinates: 39°27′48″N 77°23′37″W
- Carries: Walkersville Southern RR, formerly Frederick and Pennsylvania Line Railroad Company (F&PL)
- Crosses: Tuscarora Creek which is part of the Monocacy River watershed.
- Locale: Frederick County, Maryland
- Official name: Tuscarora Creek (Monocacy River) bridge
- ID number: Bridge 65.40 (MTA Chainage); Bridge 65.36 (ICC Chainage)
- Followed by: PRR rebuilt the bridge using steel and reconfigured a single-span steel through-girder bridge with a floor beam/stringer system and a 12-inch (300 mm) thick concrete slabs.

Characteristics
- Design: "Bollman suspension truss" a design patented by Bollman in 1852.
- Material: Mixture of wrought and cast iron.
- Total length: 63.5 feet (19.4 m)
- Width: 43.5 feet (13.3 m)
- Longest span: 63.5 feet (19.4 m)
- No. of spans: Single span all over Tuscarora Creek.
- Piers in water: None
- Clearance below: 10 feet (3.0 m) above the water

History
- Designer: Wendel Bollman
- Constructed by: Patapsco Bridge and Iron Works of Baltimore, Maryland.
- Fabrication by: Patapsco Bridge and Iron Works of Baltimore, Maryland.
- Construction start: 1871
- Construction end: 1872
- Inaugurated: April 1872

The Tuscarora Creek bridge is a 63.5-foot (19.4 m) single-span, steel, through-girder bridge with a floor beam/stringer system supporting a 12-inch (300 mm)-thick concrete slab south of Walkersville, Maryland. Originally constructed by the Frederick and Pennsylvania Line Railroad Company (F&PL) in 1872. It was later rebuilt by the Pennsylvania Railroad in 1907 as a thru girder concrete deck bridge using an older bridge from the Northern Central Railway. In 1915, the bridge was surveyed as part of the Interstate Commerce Commission's effort to establish freight rates for the Parent railroad.

As of 2021, the bridge is in active rail service, operated by the Walkersville Southern RR.

== History ==
=== Construction ===
==== Bollman Iron Bridge ====
The original plan for the railroad called for it to cross the Monocacy River below Tuscarora Creek and therefore, no bridge was located by Gitt in 1867. The finalized location for the railroad called for a bridge over Tuscarora Creek approximately 300 feet south of the Monocacy River crossing for the road. Like the other bridges on the road, the Tuscarora Creek bridge was to be a "Bollman suspension truss" with a creek span of 63 feet, 10 feet above the water. In 1872, Bollman's firm, Patapsco Bridge and Iron Works completed the bridge.

==== Pennsylvania Railroad Rebuilds ====
The ICC survey work papers (Note: ICC work papers from the 1915 field survey were dated June 13, 1916, for bridge 65.35, page 9. These work papers also list the dimensions of the girder members dates of reconstruction and sources of material if the bridges were from another bridge. Original from National Archives at College Park, MD: NACP, record group 134, stack area 570, row 43, compartment 30, shelf 02, accessed March 2013.) indicate one rebuild after the 1872 construction but before the 1915 inspection:

The Bollman iron truss span for Monocacy was replaced by the Pennsylvania Railroad in 1907 but the masonry abutments were left in place.
Pennsylvania replaced the Bollman truss with a 63.5-foot (19.4 m) single-span, steel, through-girder bridge. The 1915 ICC inspection reports indicate that the steel girders at that time were 3/8's of an inch in thickness and 50 inches (1,300 mm) deep. This 1907 replacement did not use new materials but instead, bridge 65.35 had been previously used by the Northern Central RR, or NCR as NCR bridge #33 built in 1882.
Subsequent to this ICC survey, Pennsylvania replaced the NCR bridge with a second thru girder bridge using 76 1/2 in (1,940 mm) deep x 5/8 in (16 mm) thick web side girders and a 12-inch (300 mm) thick concrete deck. This probably occurred at the same time as the Monocacy River rebuild in 1927.

No later rebuild by PRR was made after 1927 and before 1982 when the bridge was conveyed to the State of Maryland..

==== United States Railway Administration (USRA) Rebuild ====
There is no evidence of a rebuild by the USRA.

==== State Railroad Administration (SRA 1982-1989) ====
Subsequent to the conveyance of the railroad from Conrail to the State of Maryland in 1982, State Railroad Administration developed a Maryland State Rail Plan. The plan called for no action on the Tuscarora Creek bridge. Currently, the Maryland Dept. of Transportation owns the bridge.
