= Frederick and Pennsylvania Line Railroad Monocacy River Bridge =

Monocacy River Railroad Bridge and Viaduct
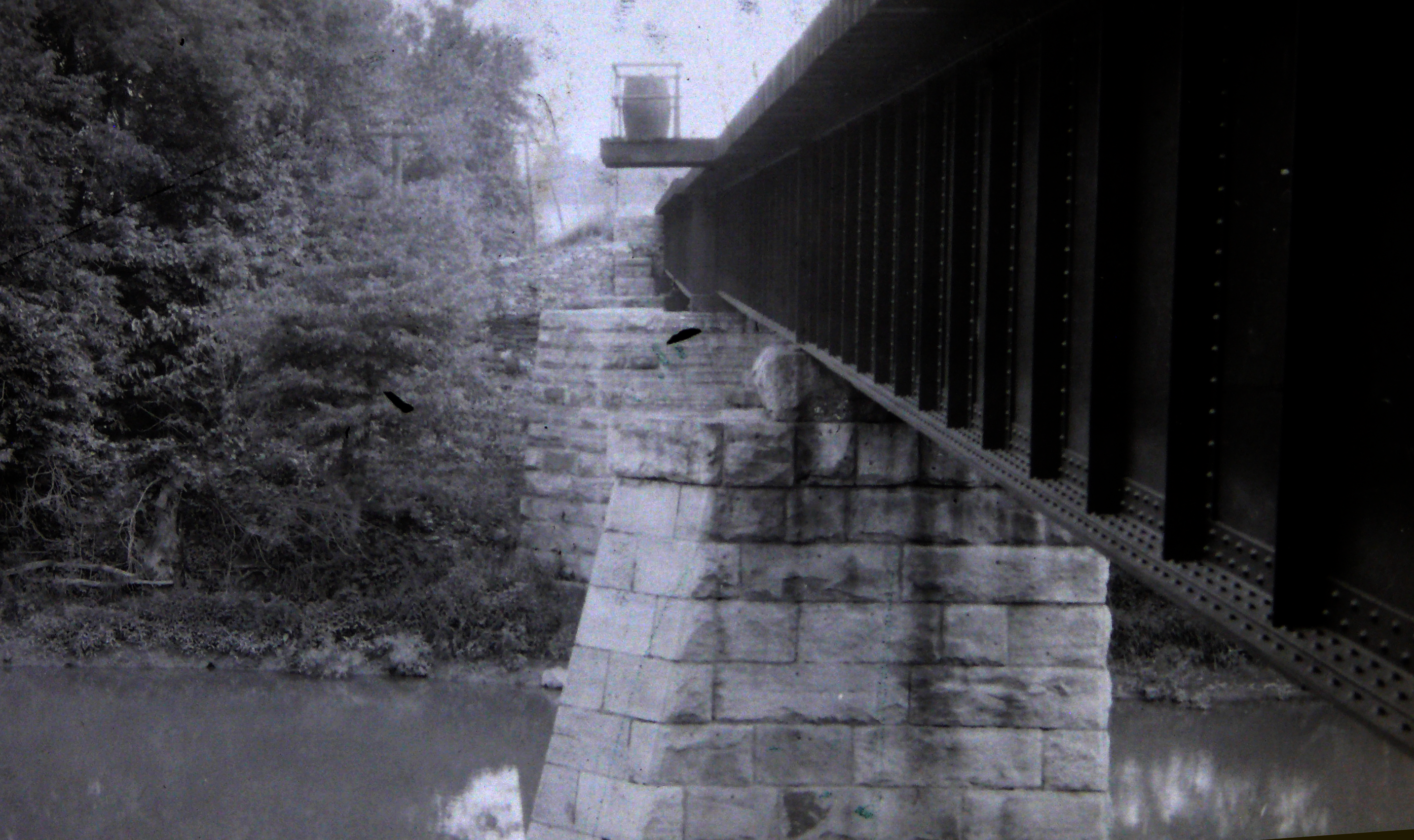
- 1915 ICC survey photo
- Coordinates: 39°27′54″N 77°23′33″W
- Carried: Walkersville Southern RR, formerly Frederick and Pennsylvania Line Railroad Company (F&PL)
- Crossed: Monocacy River
- Locale: Frederick County, Maryland
- Official name: Monocacy River railroad bridge and viaduct
- ID number: Bridge 65.35 (MTA Chainage); Bridge 65.20 (ICC Chainage)
- Followed by: 1900-1905: PRR rebuilds for first steel under-girder bridge. 1927: PRR rebuilds for second steel under-girder bridge.

Characteristics
- Design: "Bollman suspension truss" a design patented by Bollman in 1852.
- Material: Mixture of wrought and cast iron.
- Total length: 326 feet (99 m)
- Longest span: Two 84.65 feet (25.80 m)spans over Monocacy River
- No. of spans: Double span over Monocacy River with two viaduct approaches from North.
- Piers in water: One - Pier 3
- Clearance below: 30 feet (9.1 m) above the water

History
- Designer: Wendel Bollman
- Constructed by: Patapsco Bridge and Iron Works of Baltimore, Maryland.
- Fabrication by: Patapsco Bridge and Iron Works of Baltimore, Maryland.
- Construction start: 1871
- Construction end: 1872
- Inaugurated: July 1872
- Collapsed: 1972: Hurricane Agnes

Location
- Interactive map of Monocacy River Railroad Bridge and Viaduct

The Monocacy River Railroad Bridge and Viaduct is a 326-foot (99 m) open deck steel girder bridge with two main spans crossing the river and two viaduct sections crossing the floodplain, south of Walkersville, Maryland. Originally constructed by the Frederick and Pennsylvania Line Railroad Company (F&PL). Construction began in late 1871, and continued until July 1872 when the railroad opened that year. It was rebuilt by the Pennsylvania Railroad prior first in 1900-1905 as an open deck riveted iron plate under girder bridge. In 1915, the bridge was surveyed as part of the Interstate Commerce Commission's ("ICC") effort to establish freight rates for the Parent railroad. In 1927, the Pennsylvania Railroad rebuilt the bridge again using deeper and thicker steel girders, but leaving the masonry piers intact. In 1972, the two 85 foot river spans were washed out by Hurricane Agnes. In 1982, the State of Maryland purchased the bridge as part of the railroad line. In 1995, the State rebuilt the river spans and Pier 3 which is located in the middle of the river crossing was completely reconstructed using concrete to replace the original masonry foundations. (Note: The material in this section was adapted from the State of Maryland-MARYLAND TRANSIT ADMINISTRATION report on "Comprehensive Structural Inspection of Aerial Structures and Bridges" for the 2012 inspection cycle based upon field inspections in November 2012.) In 2015, the State performed minor maintenance on the structure and painted some spans.
As of 2016, the bridge is in active rail service, operated by the Walkersville Southern RR.

== History ==
=== Construction ===
==== Bollman Iron Bridge ====
The original bridge was a "Bollman suspension truss". The Monocacy river bridge and viaduct structures were a mixture of wrought iron tension members and cast iron compression members, including other decorative elements, such as Doric styled vertical members and end towers, all cast iron and detailed. In 1872, Bollman's firm, Patapsco Bridge and Iron Works completed the bridge and viaducts with a total length of 326 feet.

==== Pennsylvania Railroad Rebuilds ====
The ICC survey work papers (Note: ICC work papers from the 1916 field survey were dated June 5, 1916 for what was identified as bridge "65.20", page 9. These work papers also list dimensions of the girder members Original from National Archives at College Park, MD: NACP, record group 134, stack area 570, row 43, compartment 30, shelf 02, accessed March 2013.) indicate two rebuilds were performed on the Monocacy bridge after the 1872 construction but prior to the 1915 inspection:

The Bollman iron truss bridge of unknown span lengths for the Monocacy crossing was replaced by the Pennsylvania railroad in 1900 as part of a major rebuild of the bridge which included the abutments.

In 1900, Pennsylvania replaced the river trusses with a steel under girder, open deck bridge of four spans. At that time, the abutment and pier masonry was augmented. Five years later in 1905, the Pennsylvania railroad replaced the remaining two spans that were erected by Bollman in 1872.

Later in 1927, Pennsylvania rebuilt the entire bridge using steel plate girders of half-inch thickness and measuring 85 inches in depth. (Note: This data is from the 2012 MTA inspection reports)

No later rebuild by PRR was made after 1927 and prior to 1982 when the bridge was conveyed to the State of Maryland..

==== United States Railway Administration (USRA) Rebuild ====
No known USRA rebuild scope has been identified for this bridge.

==== State Railroad Administration (SRA 1995 - ) ====
Subsequent to the conveyance of the railroad from Conrail to the State of Maryland in 1982, State Railroad Administration or (SRA,1978–92), developed a Maryland State Rail Plan. The SRA rebuilt the two 85 foot spans over the river that were damaged by Hurricane Agnes in 1972, as well as Pier 3 which was in the river in 1995. Currently, the Department of Transportation, Maryland Transit Administration (MTA), (2001-) owns and maintains the bridge.
In 2015, MTA performed additional maintenance on the spans and painted two of the four spans as well.
