= Little Pipe Creek bridge and viaduct =

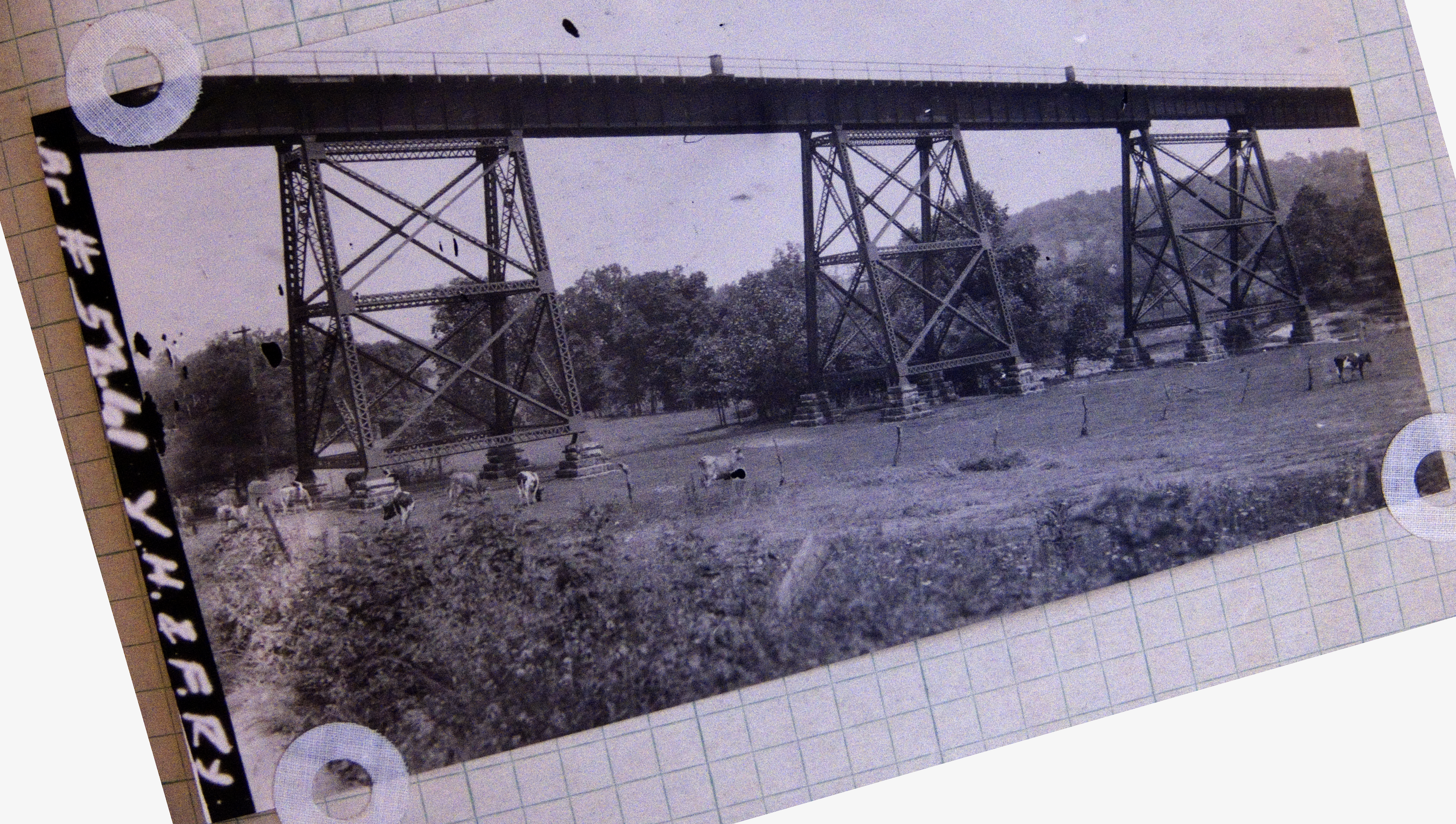
- Little Pipe Creek bridge (1915 ICC photo)
- Coordinates: 39°35′24″N 77°14′26″W
- Carries: Maryland Midland Railway (MMID)
- Crosses: Little Pipe Creek
- Locale: Frederick and Carroll Counties, Maryland
- Official name: Little Pipe Creek bridge and viaduct
- ID number: Bridge 52.61
- Followed by: 1896 with iron under girder bridge;designed and built by Pennsylvania Railroad (PRR). 1902–03 PRR rebuilt the bridge again using steel and reconfigured it into 15 spans. 1917 undocumented rebuild.

Characteristics
- Design: Bollman Truss
- Material: Mixture of wrought and cast iron.
- Total length: 705 feet (215 m)
- Longest span: 135 feet (41 m)
- No. of spans: Single span over Little Pipe Creek with viaduct approaches.
- Clearance below: 60 feet (18 m) above the water

History
- Designer: Wendel Bollman
- Constructed by: Patapsco Bridge and Iron Works of Baltimore, Maryland.
- Fabrication by: Patapsco Bridge and Iron Works of Baltimore, Maryland.
- Construction start: 1871
- Construction end: 1872
- Inaugurated: April 1872

Location
- Interactive map of Little Pipe Creek bridge and viaduct

The Little Pipe Creek bridge and viaduct is a 705-foot (215 m) continuous truss bridge with a main span and 19 viaduct sections as well as an active railroad trestle crossing Little Pipe Creek south of Keymar, Maryland. Originally constructed by the Frederick and Pennsylvania Line Railroad Company (F&PL). Construction on the trestle began in late 1871 and continued until April 1872.

The Pennsylvania Railroad acquired control of the F&PL in 1896 and rebuilt the bridge that year as an open deck riveted iron plate under a girder bridge and then again in 1902-1903 using steel in the bridge and trestle. In 1915, the bridge was surveyed as part of the Interstate Commerce Commission's effort to establish freight rates for the parent railroad. The United States Railroad Administration rebuilt the creek span circa 1917. Additional work rebuilding the bridge and trestle was performed from 1982 to 1989 by the Maryland State Railroad Administration. In 1991, the bridge was surveyed as part of the Maryland Historic Sites Inventory.

As of 2024, the bridge is in rail service, operated by the Maryland Midland Railway.

== History ==
=== Construction ===
==== Bollman Iron Bridge ====
The original bridge was to be a Bollman Truss Railroad Bridge. The Little Pipe Creek bridge and viaduct structures were to be a mixture of wrought iron tension members and cast iron compression members, including other decorative elements, such as Doric-styled vertical members and end towers, all cast iron and detailed. Bollman built about a hundred of these bridges through 1873, and this bridge, with a creek span of 135 feet, 60 feet above the water, was one of the last and largest bridges built by Bollman using his patent.

In 1872, Bollman's firm, Patapsco Bridge and Iron Works, completed the bridge and viaducts with a total length of 705 feet, spanning over little pipe creek of 135 feet, (Note: News accounts (The Republican Citizen, February 9, 1872) of the railroad from the 1872 stockholders meeting confirm that the span as originally constructed was 135 feet.) trestle consisting of 19 spans, eleven on the Frederick County side and eight on the Carroll County side of the creek.

==== Pennsylvania Railroad Rebuilds ====
In 1896, the Pennsylvania Railroad acquired control of the F&PL. The original Bollman iron truss span over Little Pipe Creek of 135 feet (Span 9 in the USRA drawing) was replaced with a steel plate under girder span of shorter length (79 feet). The immediately adjacent trestles (north and south) were also replaced with 42-foot steel trestles, leaving the rest of the original Bollman-built iron trestle approaches intact. (Note: The source for this material is taken from a field survey performed by the US Interstate Commerce Commission (ICC). The ICC work papers from the field survey were dated June 13, 1916, and were about what was identified as bridge "52.61", page 3. These work papers also list dimensions of the girder members installed as part of circa 1885-1895 rebuild Original from National Archives at College Park, MD: NACP, record group 134, stack area 570, row 43, compartment 30, shelf 02, accessed March 2013.)

In 1902-03, these remaining original Bollman trestles from 1872 were replaced by McClintic Marshall and the Phoenix Company as follows:

Approach spans 1 through 7, counting from the Frederick County or south end of the bridge, were built by McClintic Marshall in 1903. (Note: The information on this PRR and subsequent USRA rebuilds of the bridge were taken from the 1991 Maryland Historical Trust The State Historic Sites Inventory Form is noted in the references section.) Spans 11 through 15 were built from the north end by the Phoenix Bridge Company in 1902.

==== United States Railway Administration (USRA) Rebuild ====
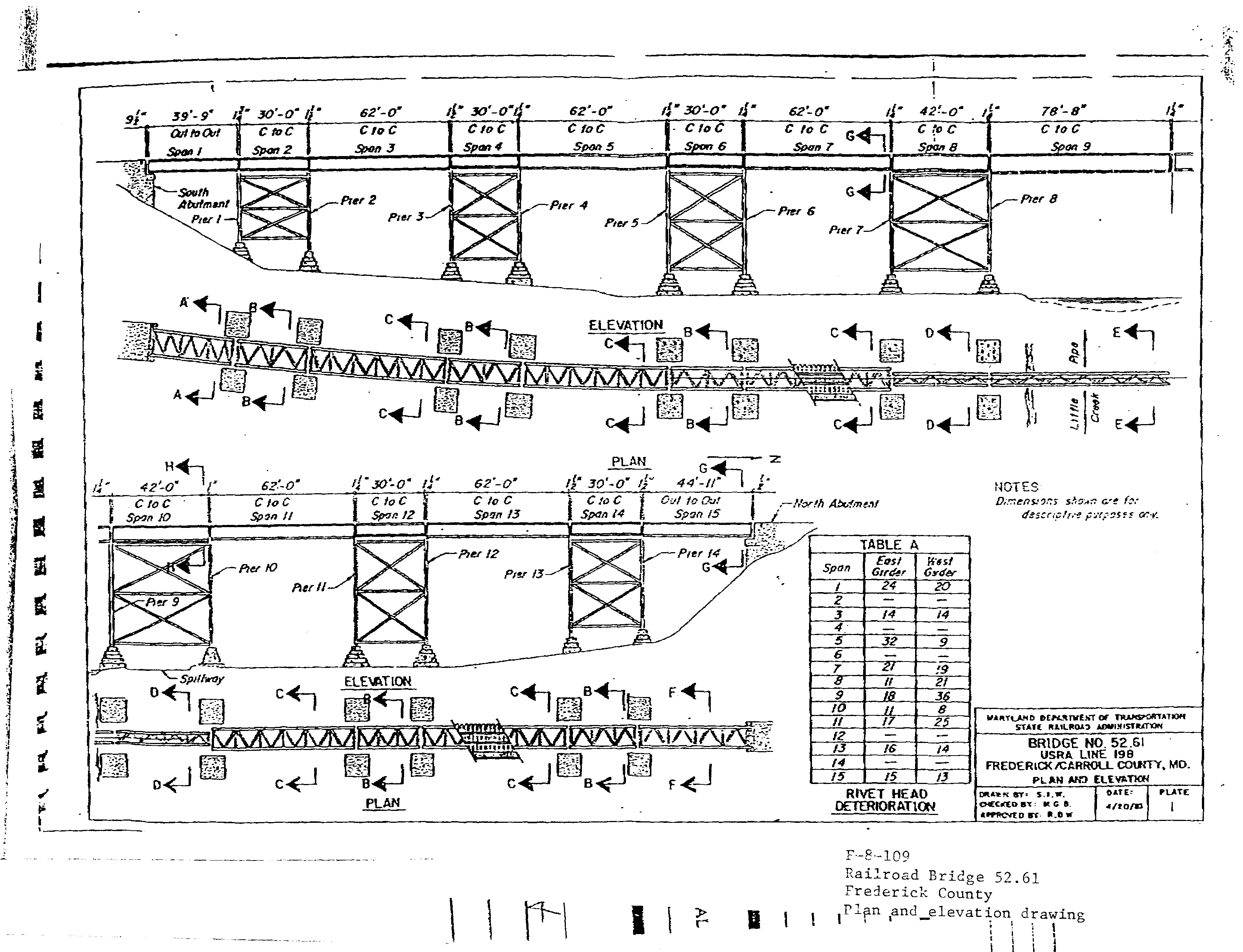
Little Pipe Creek bridge and viaduct.

In 1917, span 9, the Little Pipe Creek span was rebuilt using new materials with no information on the scope of the effort.

==== State Railroad Administration (1982-1989) ====
The Pennsylvania Railroad merged into the Penn Central in 1968. The latter company went bankrupt in 1970 and the assets were transferred to Conrail in 1976. Subsequent to the conveyance of the railroad from Conrail to the State of Maryland in 1982, the State Railroad Administration (SRA) developed a statewide Rail Plan. This plan called for the rebuild of the bridge-deck which SRA contracted for in 1987. In 1989, SRA contracted to rehabilitate the bridge by making further substructure and superstructure repairs as well as trackwork on the bridge approaches. Under its lease agreement with the State, the operating railroad replaced wooden crossties on the bridge deck in 1980.

In 1991, the bridge was surveyed as part of the Maryland Historical Trust's Inventory of Historic Properties.

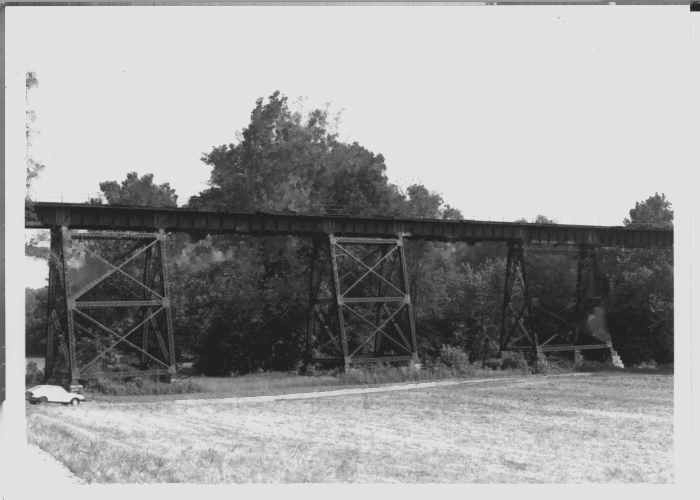
Looking westward at Frederick county spans, taken in 1991

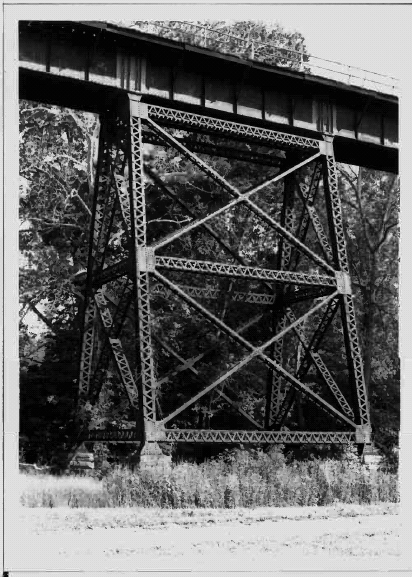
Looking westward at one of tower spans on the Frederick county side, taken in 1991

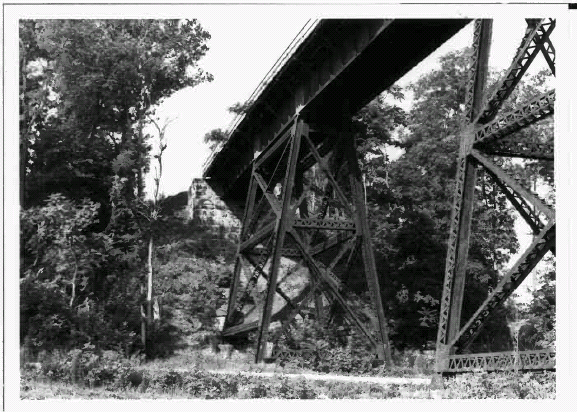
Looking southward at the Frederick county side masonry abutment, taken in 1991

==== Maryland Midland Railway ====
In 2005, The State of Maryland sold the bridge to the Maryland Midland Railway. (Note: Purchase agreement was dated February 16, 2005, and recorded among the land records of: (1) Frederick County, Maryland, in Deed Book 5856 at page 477; (2) Carroll County, Maryland, in Deed Book 4766 at page 532, and (3) Adams County, Pennsylvania, in Deed Book 4425 at page 173.)
