= Patrick H. Irwin =

American civil engineer and surveyor

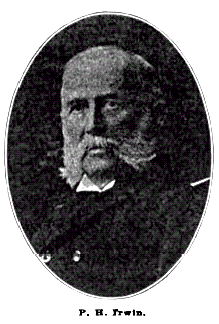
Patrick Henry Irwin (1908)

Patrick Henry Irwin (c. 1837 – 1908) was an American self-taught civil engineer and surveyor from Pennsylvania who was also mayor of the city of Westminster, Maryland.

== Career ==
From 1852 to 1856, Irwin spent summer vacations with an engineering corps working on the construction of the West Chester and Philadelphia Railroad later purchased in May 1880 by the Philadelphia, Wilmington and Baltimore Railroad and thereafter controlled by the Pennsylvania Railroad. Irwin then was appointed Assistant Engineer to Chief engineer Joseph S. Gitt for the Gettysburg Railroad. This was the second collaboration with Gitt who was also Chief Engineer for the earlier construction of the West Chester and Philadelphia Railroad. Two years later Irwin was Assistant Engineer and Resident Engineer for the Western Maryland Railroad, and by 1861 had become Superintendent.

In 1867, he worked with Gitt again as part of the survey effort for the Frederick and Pennsylvania Line Railroad Company.

In 1874 he left railroad work to go into the manufacturing business, but in 1879 was appointed Assistant Engineer in charge of the surveys and construction of the Baltimore and Ohio Railroad. After this he was, successively, Chief Engineer of Construction of Branch Lines and then Assistant Chief Engineer. In July, 1905, he was appointed Consulting Engineer to the railroad.

Irwin was mayor of the city of Westminster, Maryland from May 15, 1876, to June 4, 1883. Irwin died in 1908.
