= Frederick and Pennsylvania Line Railroad Museum =

Non-profit historic-preservation organization

- Formation: 2015 (founded); 2015 (incorporated)
- Type: NGO
- Legal status: Nonprofit organization
- Purpose: Historic preservation
- Headquarters: Walkersville, Maryland
- Coordinates: 39°18′8″N 76°37′1″W
- Region served: Frederick County, Maryland
- President: Ray Soderberg
- Website: fplmuseum.org

Frederick and Pennsylvania Line Railroad Museum is an American nonprofit historic-preservation organization headquartered in Walkersville, Maryland. The Museum was named after the namesake railroad that was built in Frederick county in 1872.

== Foundation ==
Frederick and Pennsylvania Line Railroad Museum, Inc. was founded in 2015 as a nonprofit historic preservation advocacy organization in Frederick County, Maryland. The organization has two volunteer board members and a host of volunteers who work to preserve and promote Frederick County's historic buildings, sites and neighborhoods.(Op. Cit.) The Museum has been helping historical and preservation associations, residents and volunteers advocate for the preservation and reuse of historic buildings and sites in Frederick county, Maryland. The Museum also offers technical assistance to preservation groups and communities.

== See also ==
- Frederick and Pennsylvania Line Railroad Company
- History of Frederick County
- Maryland Historical Society
