= Frederick and Pennsylvania Line Railroad Company =

U.S. railroad

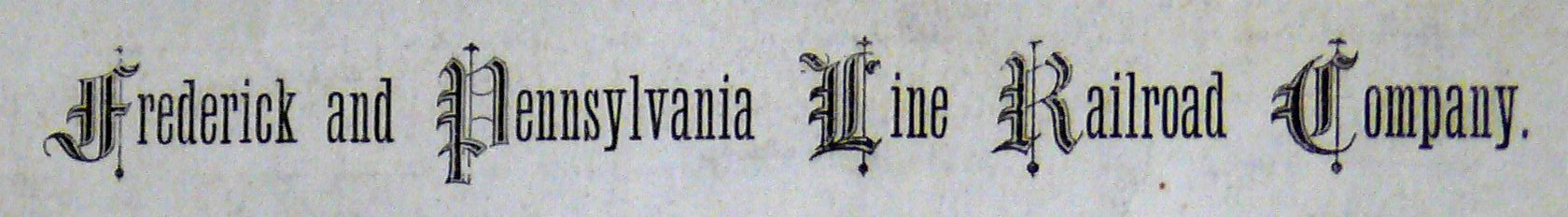
- Locale: Frederick and Carroll Counties, Maryland, United States
- Terminus: Frederick City, Maryland
- Map of the York, Hanover and Frederick Railway

Preserved operations
- Owned by: Frederick and Pennsylvania Line Railroad Company
- Stations: 7
- Length: 28 miles (45 km)

Commercial history
- Opened: 1872
- 1872-1896: Operates as Frederick and Pennsylvania Line Railroad Company
- 1896: Becomes Frederick and Northern Railroad
- 1897: Becomes York, Hanover and Frederick Railroad
- 1914: Becomes York, Hanover and Frederick Railway
- 1917-1920: Operated by United States Railroad Administration
- 1953: Becomes PennDel Company
- 1968: Becomes Penn Central Transportation Company
- 1982: Bought by State of Maryland/State Highway Admin
- Closed to passengers: 1948
- Closed: 1982
1873 Map
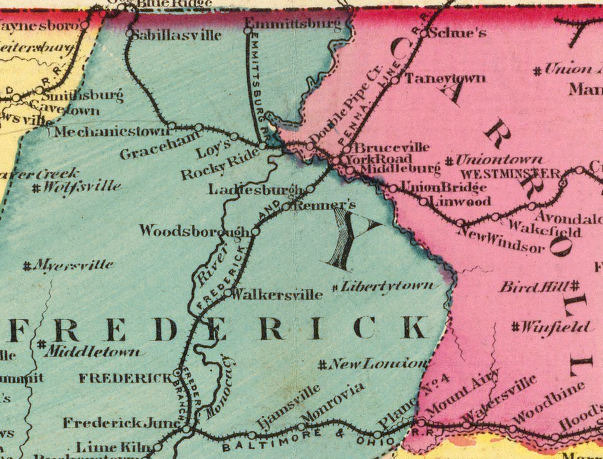

The Frederick and Pennsylvania Line railroad ran from Frederick, Maryland to the Pennsylvania-Maryland State line, or Mason–Dixon line near Kingsdale, Pennsylvania consisting of 28 miles (45.1 km) of center-line track and 29.93 miles (48.17 km) of total track including sidings. Chartered in 1867, the railroad started construction in 1869 and cost $868,687.50.

It opened October 8, 1872 and was subsequently leased to the Pennsylvania Railroad (PRR) from January 1, 1875 and in July of that year, PRR formed the Frederick Division to operate the rail line. In the spring of 1896, it was liquidated in a judicial sale to the PRR for 10 percent of its 1896 book value.

Pennsylvania reorganized the railroad in December, 1896 as the Frederick and Northern Railroad Company. In March 1897, this new company was itself merged with other PRR-controlled railways, the Littlestown Railroad Company and the Hanover and York Railroad Company into the York, Hanover and Frederick Railroad, chartered under the general laws of Pennsylvania and Maryland. In 1914, this railroad and the newly built Central Railroad of Maryland were then merged into the York, Hanover and Frederick Railway Company which remained a wholly owned stock subsidiary of the PRR into the creation of the PennDel Company on December 31, 1953, and then the Penn Central Transportation Company merger in 1968 and then bankruptcy in 1970. The Frederick and Pennsylvania Line segment and other former PRR properties in Maryland were sold by Penn Central to the State of Maryland in 1982 for $9,295,000. In 2006, the State sold approximately 20 miles of the branch to the Maryland Midland Railroad for approximately $300,000.

As of 2021, all but two miles (3.2 km) at the southern terminus at Frederick still exist, operated by either the Walkersville Southern Railroad or the Maryland Midland Railway.

== Chartering the railroad company ==
In January, 1866, organizers met in Frederick to discuss chartering a railroad from the District of Columbia to the Pennsylvania State line through Frederick. This required a legislative act by the Maryland General Assembly to incorporate and charter the railroad. Without it, the group could not solicit stock, purchase property through condemnation, or obtain financial backing in the form of stock subscriptions or bond sales from either the city or the County of Frederick. In March 1867 the Maryland General Assembly passed an Act to incorporate the Frederick and Pennsylvania line railroad. One of those senators voting to incorporate the railroad was its future president, Charles Edward Trail of Frederick.

The F&PL was authorized to raise $1 million ($_{2025}=23,036,000), in capital (at $50 per share, US$s, 1867) to construct a railroad of one or more sets of tracks (within a right of way of less than one hundred feet (30.5 m) in width) from Frederick, Maryland, through Frederick and Carroll counties to the Maryland and Pennsylvania line, in the direction of Littlestown, Pennsylvania. The charter also required the road to make connections with the Western Maryland Railroad but made no specific references to requiring the railroad to serve any of towns along the line such as Walkersville or Woodsboro. The charter further required the line to commence construction by March 1870 (three years from passage) and be completed within ten years or be dissolved.

(see also The full text of the corporation charter as well as General Regulation applicable to all railroads incorporated in the State of Maryland prior to 1872.)

In August 1868, the company was organized with John Loats elected as the first president of the railroad. This organizational effort required additional legislation. In 1868, John A. Lynch, John Sifford, and 356 others, citizens of Frederick, requested legislation to authorize the corporate authorities of Frederick to subscribe to the capital stock of the Frederick and Pennsylvania Line Rail Road, and to levy taxes on said city for such purpose. A similar measure was requested to authorize Frederick County to subscribe to the capital stock and endorse the mortgage bonds of four railroads, the Western Maryland Rail Road Company, the Frederick and Emmittsburg Rail Road Company, the Frederick and Pennsylvania Line Rail Road Company, and the Frederick and Williamsport Rail Road Company. On March 30, 1868, the Governor signed a bill authorizing the Mayor, Aldermen and Common Council of Frederick to subscribe to as much as $250,000 ($_{2025}=6,047,000) of Frederick and Pennsylvania Line Railroad Company stock and bonds subject to a vote approving such subscription. Frederick would issue its own debt to pay for the railroad capital and pay the bonds off with taxation on the real and personal property of Frederick. On May 4, 1868, the city had an election seeking approval which passed 797 to 80.

The Frederick and Pennsylvania Line Railroad Company's incorporation act was modified a second time in 1870 by the Maryland General Assembly to authorize it to build a rail line south from Frederick, its then authorized terminus through Frederick and Montgomery Counties, and on to the boundary of the District of Columbia, so as to make a direct connection with the city of Washington. The F&PL was authorized to connect with or cross over any railway in Frederick or Montgomery counties as well as construct one or more branches, none of which could exceed 15 miles (24 km) in length. The railroad was authorized to build a right of way 100 feet (30.5 m) in width, modified as necessary for cuts and fills. The company was authorized to issue another $3 million ($_{2025}=76,382,000) in stock or bonds for this purpose. The extension had to be commenced within five years (1875) and at least one set of tracks completed by 1880. This target schedule for starting construction was revised in 1874 to 1876 and complete one track by 1882, but the railroad was never extended south of its 1872 terminus.

In April 1872 the state legislature revised Frederick's charter to allow any railroad in the city such as either the Baltimore and Ohio, or the Frederick and Pennsylvania Line to construct track on any of the city's streets, lanes, or alleys. Although the right of way for the track had been granted through Frederick, the railroad then had to negotiate with the connecting railroad (Baltimore and Ohio Railroad).

In 1874 F&PL was authorized by the Maryland General Assembly to lease its railroad to any party or group of persons it saw fit, subject to the assent of a stockholder majority. Legislation was passed allowing Frederick county to purchase stock of any turnpike built or starting construction after 1868.

In 1878, the railroad issued preferred stock which if issued must pay a perpetual dividend of six per cent, per annum out of the profits of said company.

In 1882, the railroad was ordered not to obstruct any streets in Taneytown, longer than five minutes nor to allow any of its engines to stop longer than five minutes noting in the law's preamble that a great inconvenience has been suffered by the citizens of Taneytown and vicinity. (Session Laws, 1882 Special Session) Two years later, the railroad is ordered to station a flagman or a signalman by day and by night, at the crossing over the Frederick and Woodsboro turnpike, near Frederick, in Frederick County.

== Engineering the railroad ==
In the period just after the American Civil War, engineering a railroad consisted of locating the route, choosing locations for structures and their size and then contracting for the work. (See article on construction contracting)

=== Route location ===
The first step in locating a route is to establish the class of the road (Main line or branch line), the terminals and perhaps one or more intermediate points such as crossings or stations, etc. The road's organizers had promoted the preferable route as being terminated in Frederick and then proceeding north crossing the Monocacy river through Israel's Creek and into Pennsylvania using Piney Creek, which heads near Littlestown, offering a valley route almost the entire distance.

Railroad topography can be broadly classed into three types:

- (1) level prairie country offering no obstacles in the way of hills, valleys, etc., and allowing the locating engineer much latitude in the placing of his line, and consequently reducing distance and curvature to a minimum;
- (2) rolling, hilly country through which several lines are possible, none of them departing to any great extent from the direct line between controlling points; and
- (3) mountainous country, which taxes the skill and ingenuity of the locating engineer to the utmost.

The railroad was promoted as a route of the second type and was almost an "air line".

==== Reconnaissance and Preliminary Survey ====
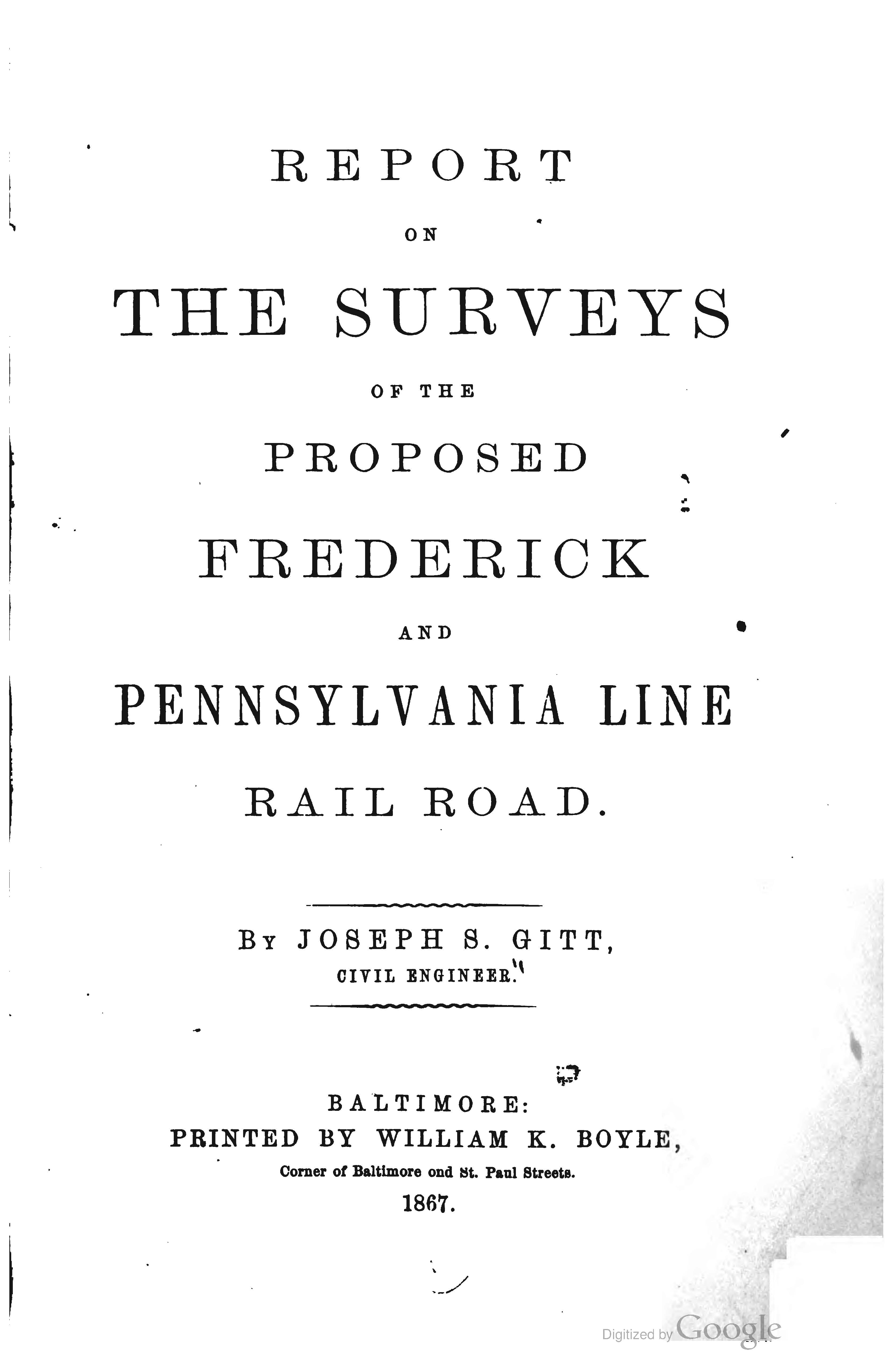
Cover page for 1867 Gitt survey for Frederick and Pennsylvania Line RR

In 1867, Joseph Gitt and P.H. Irwin located a route for the Frederick and Pennsylvania Line Railroad. Unlike the 1865 survey for the Western Maryland, Gitt made a much shorter reconnaissance in the field on horseback for the proposed road and did not supplement that information with instrumental surveys. The major feature of Gitt's proposed route was that from Woodsboro south into Frederick, it was located between the Woodsboro and Frederick Turnpike, now Maryland Route 194 and Israel Creek. Aside from diverting in Walkersville, the road continued south along the eastern side of the turnpike, crossing over at the toll house and crossing the Monocacy just north of what is today Route 194 at Ceresville, Md.

The first route south of Walkersville terminated opposite the Court House, at Church Street, in Frederick, Md. on the west side. (The Frederick branch line was on the east side.) Gitt and Irwin conducted a second survey, this time starting in Frederick at the Baltimore and Ohio Railroad (B&O) depot at South Street in downtown Frederick, Maryland on the east end heading north out to intercept the line established by their first survey at Worman's Mill and intercept the first line near the river crossing.

Gitt recommended a truss bridge crossing for the Monocacy river with an elevation of 30 feet, and two spans of 150 feet each with no references to any wooden trestle work on the north shore of any length or masonry foundations. Bridges were also required for Big Pipe Creek with an elevation of 50 feet, and span of 150 feet; Little Pipe Creek with an elevation of 58 feet, and span of also 150 feet with no references to any wooden trestle work on the south–north shore of any length or masonry foundations.

Gitt developed the cost estimate for the road assuming single track operation, iron rail at 50 pounds per yard, ties on 24 inch centers, a road bed base fourteen foot in width, with slopes of one foot horizontal to each vertical for cuts and twelve foot in width for embankments with slopes of one foot and-a-half horizontal to each vertical, no excavation deeper than 25 feet or embankments over 30 feet. As in his Western Maryland work, the cost for right of way was not included in Gitt's estimate. The ruling grade for Gitt's proposed route was 52.8 feet to the mile, or 1% and no curve was shorter than 1,000 feet. The highest point on the line between Littlestown and Frederick at 520 feet was one mile west of Ladiesburg, Maryland while the lowest point on the line at 281 feet was at the Frederick station. (Data from 1953 USGS topo maps) At the end of their survey, Gitt and Irwin estimated that their proposed 30 mile alignment could be shortened by a half-mile with more careful work, or 29.5 miles.

Gitt estimated that the cost of constructing the railroad, independent of right of way, was $604,752 ($_{2025}=13,931,000 at today's prices) approximately $20,000 ($_{2025}=461,000) per mile or $12,400 ($_{2025}=286,000) per kilometer. The advantage for the road was cutting the distance to the rail center at York, Pennsylvania by 7 or 8 miles (11 or 13 km). The distance from Hanover Junction to Frederick was 69 miles (111 km) less than through the Frederick branch. The grades at no point on the proposed route exceeded sixty feet to the mile (1.14%).

Crucially, Gitt estimated the potential revenue for the road at $103,000 per year ($_{2025}=2,373,000) of which $10,000 was from passenger traffic.

==== Final Location and Construction Survey ====
Although Gitt surveyed a route in 1867, the railroad solicited proposals for final engineering and route location in late 1868 and in October of that year, the Board received separate proposals from Gitt and Irwin as well as its future chief engineer John A. Haydon. The Board minutes show that Haydon's proposal was selected for its detail. In December of that year, the railroad purchased survey instruments from the firm of Frederick W. King (1821 - 1889) and Richard King (1823 - 1905) Baltimore, Maryland. Haydon commenced work on the railroad in May 1869 (Ibid.) with fellow civil engineer Calvin L Fulton (1837-1911) as his assistant.

In the following year (1869), at its June 2 meeting, the Board directed road engineer Haydon to resurvey road location from Littlestown to the state line. Haydon completed his resurvey and in December,1869 the Board approved relocating the line from Gitt's alignment along Israel Creek (the east-side route) through Woodsboro, Walkersville and into Frederick to Haydon's west-side alignment along Glade Creek. The Board ordered a review on the Harmony Grove segment in the Spring of 1870, but by the fall of 1870, Haydon's resurvey was complete and on September 27, 1870: Haydon presented his report on the west and east line location study with the east line in Frederick connecting with the B&O being adopted.

When construction was completed two years later, the road's total length had been shortened another mile to 28.5 miles. A number of changes had been made:

Heading north, the final alignment started on the east-side, going up east street in Frederick, Maryland in a direct line to Harmony Grove (west of Gitt's line) at an elevation of 315 feet and two miles. As constructed the line distance to The Monocacy river was milepost 3.75 miles, while Gitt's line called for crossing The Monocacy river at milepost 4.0; 1.5 miles to the southwest.
Beyond the Monocacy and up to Woodsboro, the road was aligned to the east slope of Glade creek whereas Gitt had placed the road on the western slope of Israel creek.
The road had 45 curves, one of 9 degrees in Frederick Md and the others at 5 degrees or less. Unlike Gitt's 1% grade, the largest grade was 1.44% also in Frederick.
The railroad was built with 56lb iron rail, not the 50 recommended by Gitt.

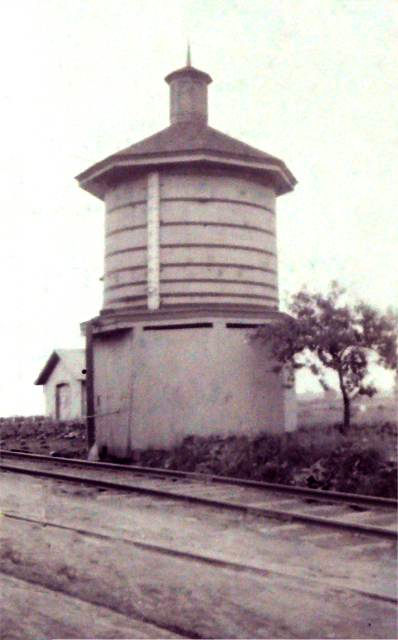
1916 ICC photograph of FPL Frederick Water tower, looking north.

On June 12, 1872, Brevet Col, John A. Haydon was paid for completing the road in cash ($800), shares (4 shares) and second mortgage bonds.

==== Other Engineering ====
- The elements of engineering required for the final route location included bridges:
  - Tuscarora Creek bridge
  - Monocacy river bridge and viaduct
  - Big Pipe Creek and Little Pipe Creek, near Keymar each of which required a bridge and viaduct.
  - A bridge crossing for the Western Maryland Railroad at Keymar, Maryland along with facilities and connecting track.
  - Piney Creek bridge
- Numerous culverts, cuts, and embankments
- Construction of two water tanks, one at Keymar, Maryland and the other at Frederick, Maryland.
- Station facilities
- Terminal facilities at Frederick, inclusive of the engine house and passenger stations.

The rolling stock consisted of two locomotives, one sixty passenger wooden coach, fifteen house and gondola cars and a sufficient number of truck, dump and hand cars for the service of the road, the aggregate cost of which was $12,186 ($_{2025}=327,000).

== Constructing the railroad ==
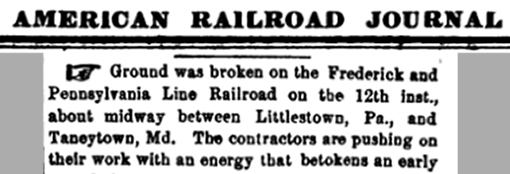
Newspaper announcement that construction started at the State line between Maryland and Pennsylvania in 1870.

On July 29, 1869, the railroad celebrated the start of construction near Woodsboro, Maryland roasting an Ox whole in barbecue style. The time required to award contracts for construction delayed the actual start of construction until the following January 15, 1870 with completion anticipated for June 1871. This was only weeks ahead of the 1867 charter requirement to commence construction by March 1870 or be dissolved.

Later that year, the railroad advertised for proposals for the bridge masonry for the two Pipe Creek Bridges.

In July,1870, the "...troubles of the company in relation to money have been overcome, and no further trouble is anticipated on that subject."

Example of a piece of iron rail manufactured in 1872 by the Baltimore and Ohio railroad

In December 1870, the railroad awarded a contract to Lochiel Iron Company of Pennsylvania for the iron rails to lay the railroad. The remainder of the iron rail for the road into Frederick would be purchased in March 1872.

During 1871, construction had progressed to the point where the road bed throughout the three divisions was practically completed including work in Frederick itself in Biser's field north end of Love Lane or East Street. Track-laying of the iron rail purchased from Lochiel had been carried from the State line to Little Pipe Creek eleven miles.

Wendel Bollman's company Patapsco Bridge and Iron Works of Baltimore was awarded contracts for the Tuscarora and Monocacy River bridges as well as the viaducts over Little and Big Pipe creeks and by the end of 1871, Big Pipe creek was erected. These bridges were to be "Bollman suspension truss" a design patented by Bollman in 1852. Similar to the Savage Mill Trail bridge with two 80 foot spans and the Harper's ferry bridges, the Frederick and Pennsylvania Line truss structures were to be a mixture of wrought iron tension members and cast iron compression members, including other decorative elements, such as Doric styled vertical members and end towers, all cast iron and detailed. Bollman built about a hundred of these bridges through 1873 and these bridges at spans of 150 and 60 feet above water would be some of the last and largest bridges built by Bollman using his patent.

Going into 1872, the railroad had five turnouts (switches), 3 miles of iron rail and 27,000 cross ties on hand for the work that year, but overall, progress on the road had been slowed for .."want of labor". However, during that period, the first train passed in January, from Littlestown to the banks of Big Pipe Creek, a distance of fourteen miles and within a mile of the Western Maryland railroad, which interchange was to be completed by February. This completed connections with the PRR-controlled Hanover and Littlestown railroads as well as the Western Maryland, allowing the Pennsylvania Company to run their engines over the road bringing in all the iron from the North Central (Littlestown) and Hanover branch.

In April, Patapsco Bridge and Iron Works completed the bridge and viaducts over Little Pipe Creek, a total length of 705 feet, the deck of the bridge with a span of 135 feet, 60 feet above low water; trestling consisting of 19 spans, eleven on the Frederick and eight on the Carroll county side of the creek was made of rolled iron plates, forming six angular tubular columns "securely riveted together, and apparently of great strength".

Over the next several months, trackwork proceeded south from big pipe creek through Bruceville (now known as Keymar), then on to Woodsboro, and then in August, 1872 trackwork had been completed through Woodsboro and onto towards Walkersville, then at a point 3 miles south of Woodsboro. On September 28, 1872 the track was finished as far as the north side of 8th or North Street at the head of Love Lane or East Street in Frederick. Local citizens were offered rides on the newly completed line, noting the good substantial bridges over the Monocacy & Tuscorora built of iron.

The line was completed and ready for revenue service and on September 29, 1872, the first regular passenger train left Frederick (corner of East & Eighth Street) for Westminster (where they now have the Carroll County Cattle Show) with a round trip fare costing $1.35 ($_{2025}=26.9). At that time, no connection had been made with the B&O railroad to the south and no station had been built in Frederick but a local citizen wished the road success because it had been met with great opposition.

== Revenue Service Years ==
=== Hanover Branch Railroad Management (June 1872-March 1873) ===
In June 1872, the Hanover and York Railroad Company also known as Hanover Branch Railroad reported as part of its annual report to stockholders that it would be providing operations assistance to the Frederick and Pennsylvania Line, Littlestown Railroad and the Bachman Valley Railroad.

The Frederick and Pennsylvania Line itself was completed and ready for revenue service by the Hanover and York Railroad Company on September 29, 1872. The first regular passenger train left Frederick (corner of East & Eighth Street) for Westminster on September 29, 1872 with a round trip fare costing $1.35 ($_{2025}=36). At that time, no connection had been made with the B&O railroad to the south and no station had been built in Frederick but a local citizen wished the road success because it had been met with great opposition. On October 7, 1872, the Board approved seven manned stations with annual compensation for its agents at $750 per year ($_{2025}=20,156).

David M. Scholl at Georgetown/Walkersville
Shank at Woodsboro
Issac Renner at New Midway
Samuel Birchey at Ladiesburg
U. Heiltabidle at Loat's Junction
Dr. Rinedollar at Taneytown
Shue at Shue's station.

The following May, the railroad had regularly scheduled passenger service (two trains a day) between Frederick and the Western Maryland connection in Bruceville, Maryland and in Littlestown for connections north. By July, 1872, the railroad directly connected with the B&O trackage on the Frederick branch at Pyfer's coal yard, lower depot.

=== Frederick and Pennsylvania Line Management (March 1873 - January 1, 1875) ===
Label for Board of Directors' Minutes Book for the Frederick and Pennsylvania Line RR

In 1868 at the August 10th meeting control of the company was formally handed over to the newly elected directors from the commissioners as required by the charter with John Loats elected president. On February 13, 1872, Charles Trail would be elected president and serve in that capacity until the roads demise twenty-four years later.

While Gitt had estimated that the road would produce over $100,000 as year in revenue, by September 15, 1873 (With revenue operations of almost a year) the Board heard a committee report that found that the cause of lower than expected freight revenue was due to a lack of freight sidings, switches and facilities such as public team tracks. On March 31, 1874, Board authorizes a statement that it is unable to pay interest on the first mortgage series due to winter damages and a lack of aid from the city and county.

Still, the railroad had impacted travel in the county. An example was the October, 1874 Frederick County Cattle Show which had more attendance than at any former year with attendance estimated at 8 or 10 thousand persons. One reason was the railroads reduced their fare to one half. Governor William Bigler of Pennsylvania delivered an address on the Centennial Exhibition at Philadelphia to be held in 1876. Governor Bradford of Maryland was also there. A local observer noted that the town was ..."as lively as Broadway in New York." The losses continued to mount however and in December 1874, the Board approved leasing the railroad to the Pennsylvania Railroad Company

=== Pennsylvania Railroad Management (January 1, 1875 - November 20, 1896) ===
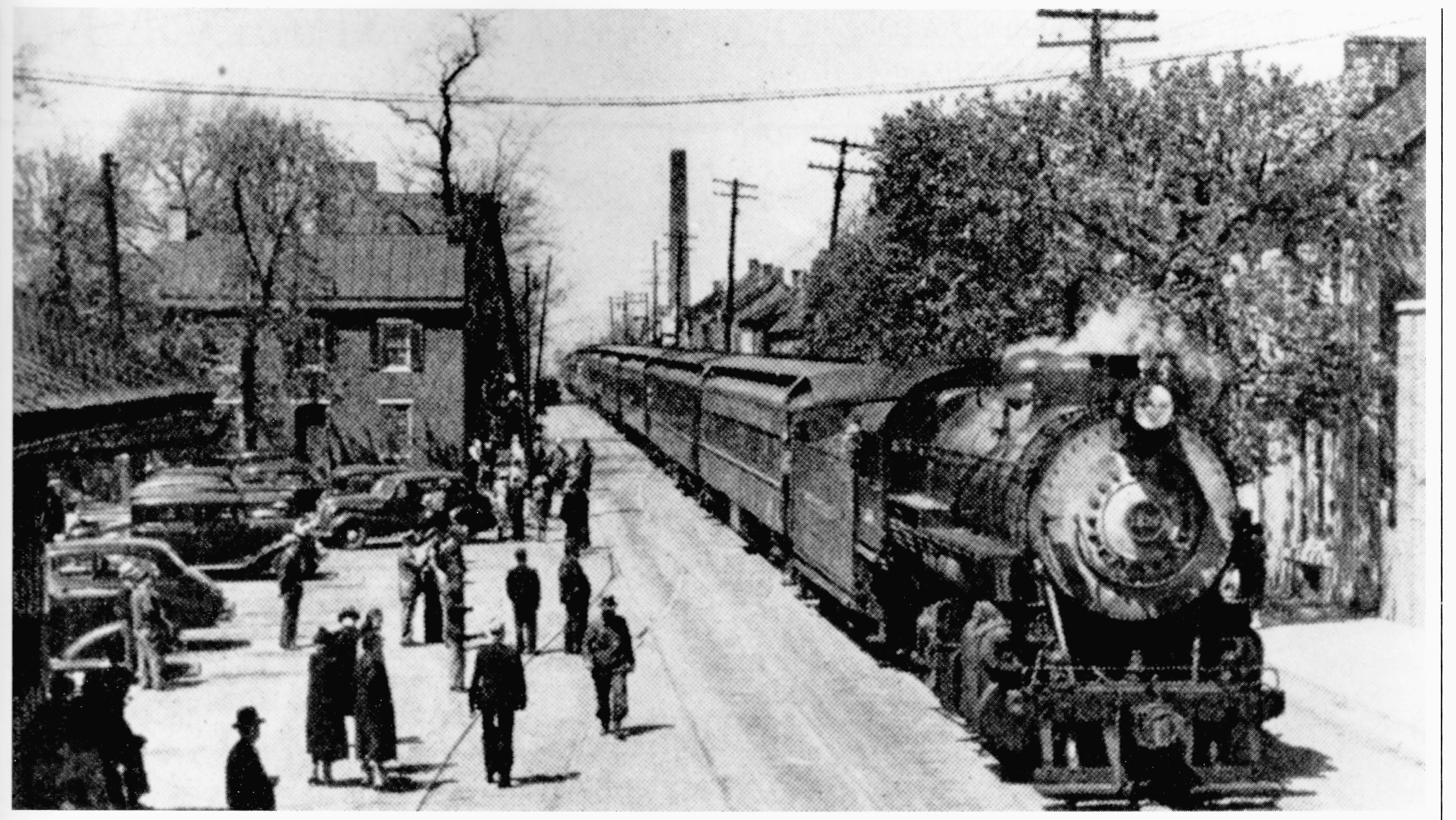
Pennsylvania railroad excursion train in downtown Frederick, Maryland, circa 1940

Full text copy of the Pennsylvania Railroad Lease of the Frederick and Pennsylvania Line RR from Director's minute book

On January 1, 1875, the Pennsylvania Railroad Company leased the Frederick & Pennsylvania and the Littlestown Railroads. It also leased the Hanover & York Railroad, effective July 5, 1875, the three roads having a total length of 55.5 miles, and extending the Pennsylvania Railroad from York, Pennsylvania to Frederick, Maryland. They were to be operated at cost and compensation for the use of their equipment. That same year on July 1, the Pennsylvania established the Frederick Division with the York Branch and the Columbia Bridge, formerly operated as a portion of the Philadelphia Division, being transferred to, thus making that Division extend from Columbia to Frederick, a distance of 69.5 miles. The earnings that first year were $33,000. (Note: 29th Annual Report to Stock Holders of the Pennsylvania Railroad. Philadelphia. 1875. p. 140.) In early 1876, the Pennsylvania Railroad made plans for a depot in Frederick, purchasing the following real property fronting on East Street (or Love Lane) between Church & Second Streets:

House & lot from Michael Lotz for $2000.
House & lot from Mrs. Lightner for $900.
House & lot from Mr. George K.Birely for $1800.
House & lot from Frederick Wertheimer for $1000.
House & Lot from George W. Cramer for $300.
(the old Justus Gerecht Property) for $604.
House & lot around the corner on Second Street from A. Sheffield for $1900.
House & lot on same street from Mrs. Buckels for $2000.
House & lot on same street from Mrs. Smith for $2000.

Going into 1896, the year of its bankruptcy and sale, the railroad still only had two scheduled trains a day northbound to Philadelphia coming out of Frederick going through Walkersville and Woodsboro with five trains out of York, Pennsylvania; travel time from Frederick to Walkersville was 16 minutes and 27 minutes to Woodsboro. No other station stops besides these. The morning mail run left Frederick at 9am. The stockholders meeting was publicized for February 28, 1896 in Baltimore at the Northern Central RR offices. Eleven directors were slated to be elected with five of those being the Frederick Mayor and Alderman. Trail was again, re-elected president; Stephen White, who was not only secretary to the Frederick and Pennsylvania Line, but a number of other PRR controlled railroads including the Northern Central and A. W. Hendrix as treasurer who like White served in similar positions to other PRR controlled railroads. Also attending this meeting was Mayor Aquilla R. Yeakle of Frederick as a member of the Board.

PRR internal memo describing Frederick and Pennsylvania Line RR losses after judicial sale in 1896

The following month in March, newspapers reported that the railroad was being sold. On June 10, a public auction ordered by the circuit court was held at the Frederick county court house. With little attendance and no other bidders present, in nine minutes, the road was sold to George Massey, a lawyer for the Pennsylvania Railroad for $150,000. The sale was for property only as at that time the road owned no rolling stock. Aside from its initial purchase of equipment in 1872, all equipment had been provided through either an earlier agreement with the Hanover railroad, or the later PRR lease.

The following year in January, 1897 again in Baltimore, the railroad was reorganized into the Frederick and Northern Railroad Company. At that time, it was reported that the predecessor line was barely able to cover operating expenses and rarely turned a profit. It never earned the interest payable on its bonds, (Frederick was the largest bondholder) and at the time of its foreclosure, the unpaid interest exceeded the principal.

=== York, Hanover and Frederick railway (YH&F) 1897-1953 ===
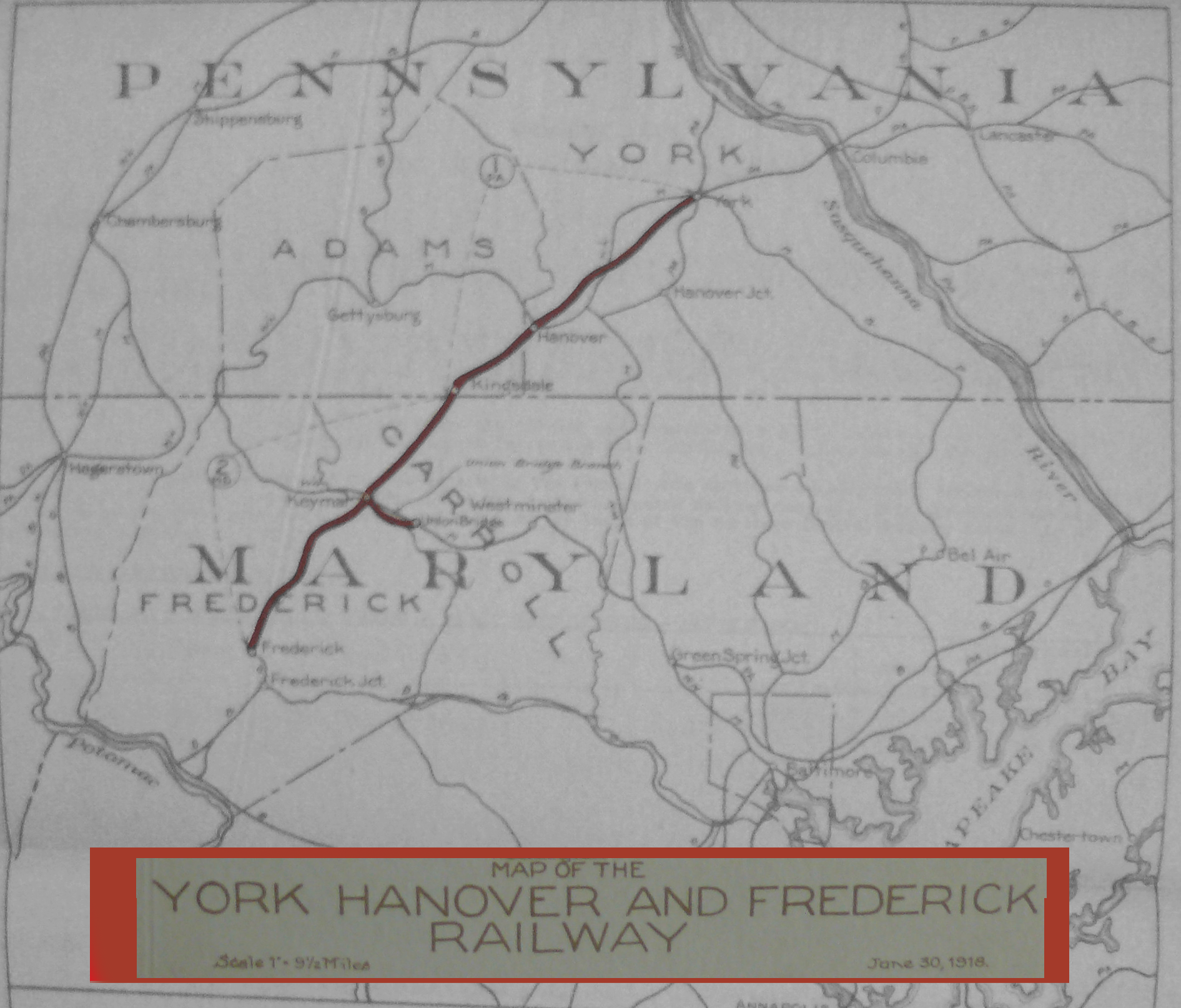
York Hanover and Frederick railway system map in 1918

In March 1897, this new company was itself merged with other Pennsylvania-controlled railways (Littlestown Railroad Company and the Hanover and York Railroad Company) into the York, Hanover and Frederick Railroad Company, chartered under the general laws of Pennsylvania and Maryland.

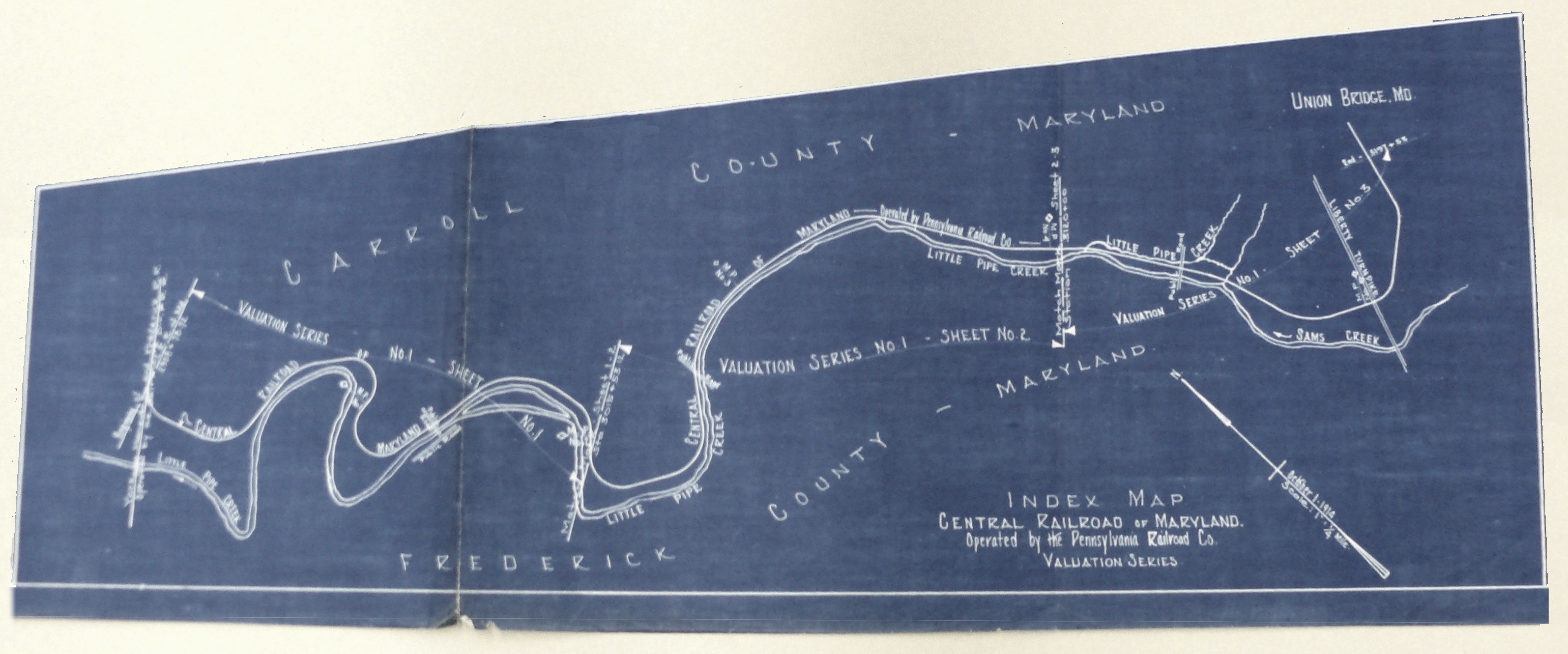
Central Railroad of Maryland map from ICC valuation maps 1916

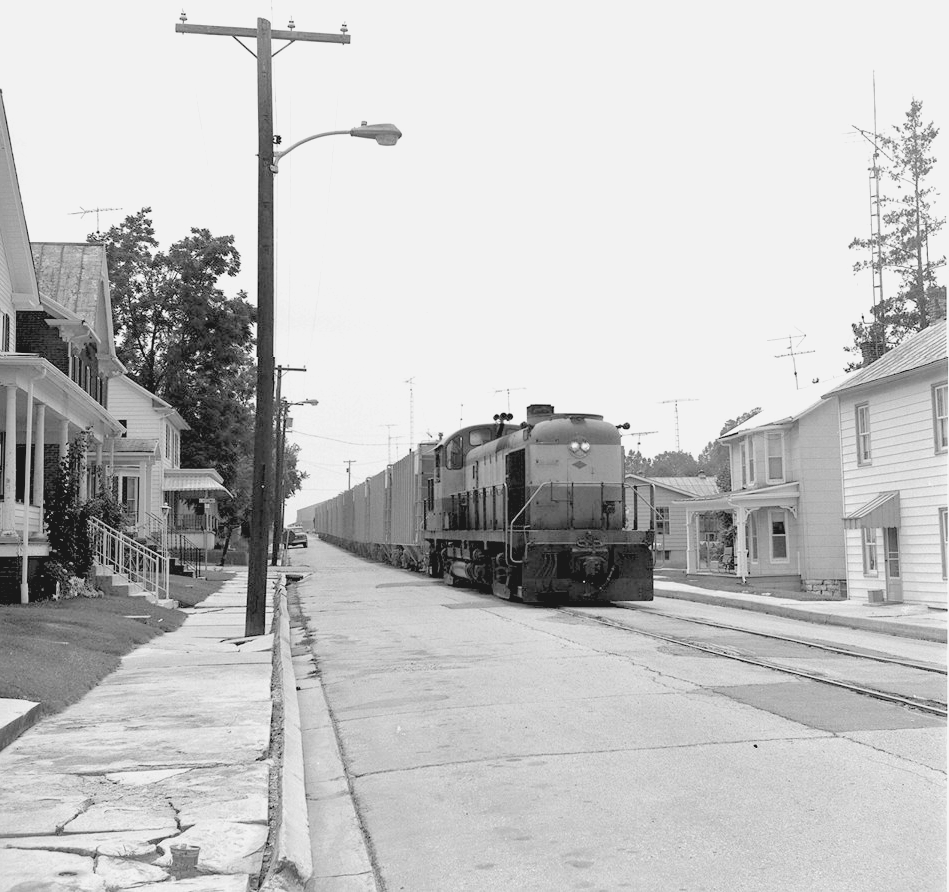
Central Railroad of Maryland on Farquhar St, Union Bridge MD in 1984 and Maryland Midland train by Charlie Hill

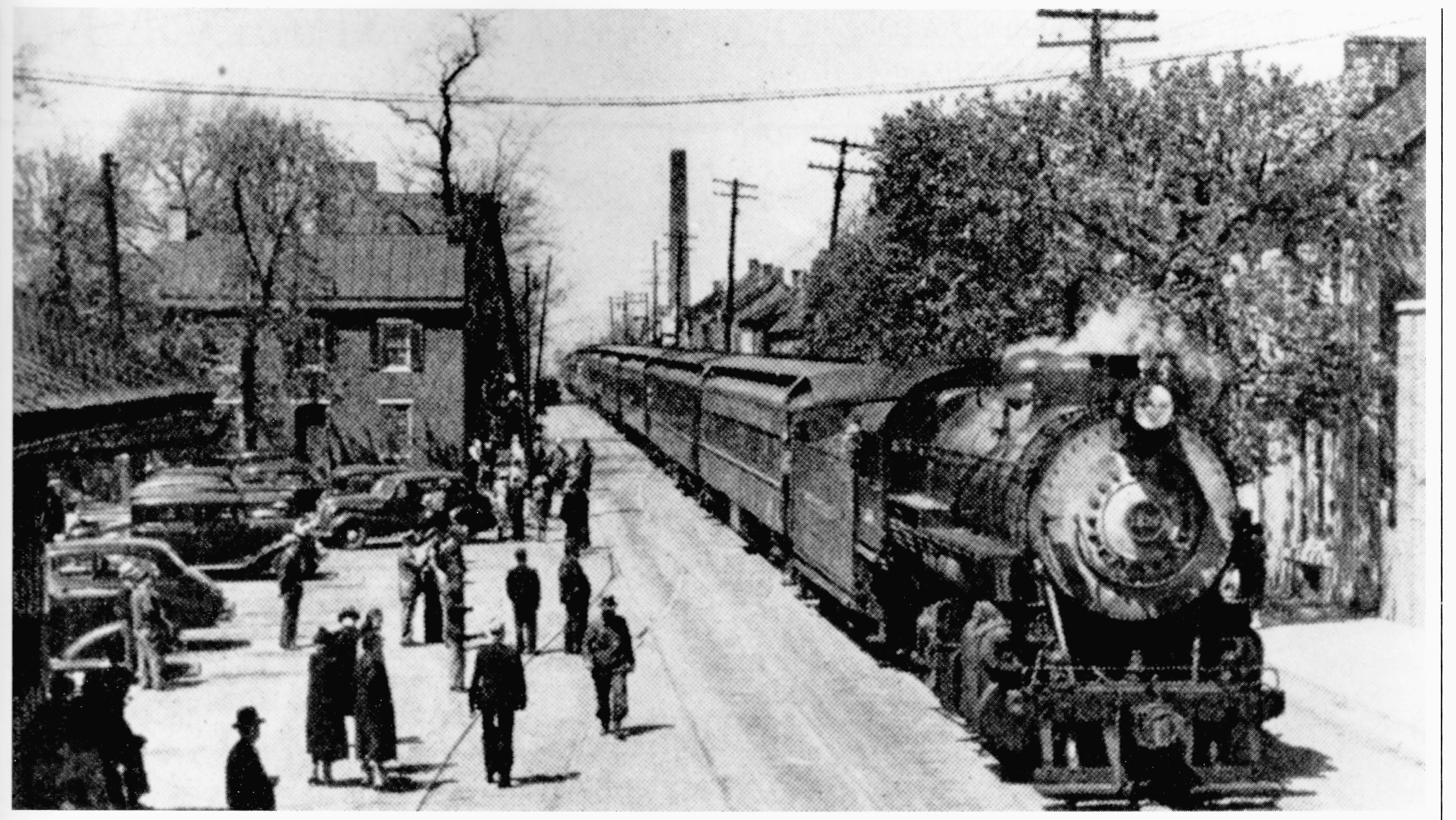
Pennsylvania railroad excursion train in downtown Frederick, Maryland, circa 1940

=== Central Railroad of Maryland (CRM) ===
In 1911, the Tidewater Portland Cement Company commenced operations in Union Bridge, Maryland as one of only two portland cement plants in the State and serviced by a rail connection on the Western Maryland mainline. Unsatisfied with Western Maryland's freight tariffs, Tidewater approached the York, Hanover and Frederick Railroad in order to secure an extension to its plant, a distance of 5.146 miles. As an incentive to build the spur, Tidewater agreed to guarantee a minimum shipment of 500,000 tons of cement over the line. In 1914, this newly built Central Railroad of Maryland was merged into the York, Hanover and Frederick Railway Company and renamed as the Union Bridge branch. The branch was abandoned in 1971 and track removed in 1972.

The York, Hanover and Frederick Railway remained a wholly owned stock subsidiary of the PRR into the creation of the PennDel company on December 31, 1953 and then the Penn Central merger in 1968 and then bankruptcy in 1970.

=== Maryland Department of Transportation ===
The Frederick and Pennsylvania Line segment was transferred to the State of Maryland for use by the Maryland Department of Transportation in 1982 for $9.2 million. In 2006, the State transferred title to the Maryland Midland Railway for the following:

"real property, railroad track and appurtenant railroad facilities comprising portions of the lines of railroad known as the Western Maryland Railroad Company's former Highfield-Glyndon Line and Penn Central's Littlestown to Frederick Line. The portion of the former Penn Central Littlestown to Frederick Line subject to the PSA consists of approximately 20.25 miles of the railroad right-of-way beginning at valuation station 2091+56 (Mile Post 39) in Littlestown,(Pennsylvania), proceeding southwesterly to just north of North Glade Road, north of Walkersville,(Maryland)..."

The remainder of the Frederick and Pennsylvania Line other than the southern portion leased by the City of Frederick (South of MP 2.5/66.5) is still owned by the State of Maryland and operated by a common carrier.

== See also ==
- List of defunct Maryland railroads
