= Calvin L. Fulton =

American surveyor and civil engineer (1840–1907)

Calvin L Fulton
- Born: January 1, 1840; Pennsylvania, United States
- Died: January 3, 1907 (aged 67); Woodlawn, Baltimore County, Maryland, United States
- Burial place: Lorraine Park Cemetery
- Occupations: surveyor, civil engineer
- Spouse: Margaret Georgiana Fulton (m. 1863; died 1874)
- Children: 2

Calvin L Fulton (January 1, 1840 – January 3, 1907) was an American surveyor and civil engineer. His career spanned the mid 19th century from canal surveys to railroads and then municipal planning. He worked with John A Haydon as assistant engineer on the Frederick and Pennsylvania Line Railroad in Frederick, Maryland. He was also surveyed for the extension of the Chesapeake and Ohio canal from Cumberland, Maryland, to Pittsburgh, Pennsylvania, as part of the United States Corps of Engineers in 1873–1874. He produced numerous plans for municipalities in New Jersey and Pennsylvania, most notably his plan for Princeton, New Jersey, in 1875.

== Early life and family ==
Fulton married Margaret Georgiana Fulton (1839-1874) in 1863 at Frederick, Maryland. They had two children, Ada and Lela Fulton.

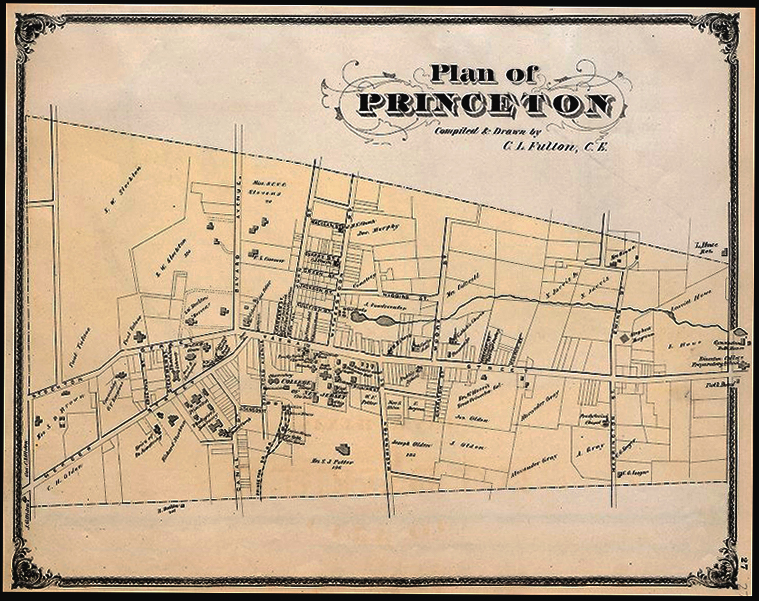
1875 Fulton map of Princeton New Jersey

== Published works ==
- Map of South Amboy Township, now South Amboy and Sayreville, Middlesex County. New Jersey. 1867.
- Plan for Princeton, New Jersey (1875)
- Map of East Brunswick Township (now including South River. Helmetta, Spotswood and part of Milltown Borough, Middlesex County, N.J.) Philadelphia. PA; Published by Everts and Stewart; 1876.
- Plan of Metuchen, Middlesex County, New Jersey. Everts and Stewart; 1876.
- Lancaster County, 2nd Geological Survey, 1878-1884 [maps collected by the Survey. Fulton produced the following maps:
  - Map of Strasburg Township
  - Map of East Lampeter Township, with Bird in Hand, Smoketown and Soudersburg map details.
  - Map of Mount Joy Township. with Mt. Joy Borough and Springville map details.
  - Map of West Donegal Township. with Elizabethtown and Newville map details.
  - Map of Ephrata Township. Plan of Strasburg
  - Map of Upper Leacock Township. Plan of Ephrata.

== Death ==
Fulton died on Jan 3, 1907 at Woodlawn, in Baltimore County, Maryland. He was interred at Lorraine Park Cemetery in Baltimore, Maryland.
