= Wills Creek Bollman Bridge =

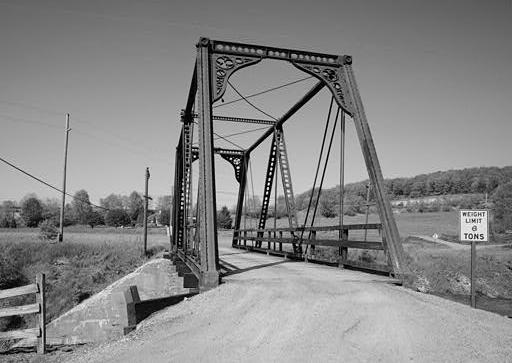
- Wills Creek Bollman Bridge, pictured at former location
- Coordinates: 39°49′06″N 78°59′41″W
- Carries: Allegheny Highlands section of Great Allegheny Passage trail
- Crosses: Scratch Hill Road
- Locale: Meyersdale, Pennsylvania

Characteristics
- Design: truss bridge
- Total length: 52 feet (16 m)
- Height: 13 feet (4.0 m)

History
- Opened: 1871

Location
- Interactive map of Wills Creek Bollman Bridge

The Wills Creek Bollman Bridge originally served the Baltimore and Ohio Railroad's Pittsburgh Division main line.

Designed by the self-taught civil engineer Wendel Bollman in 1871, this truss bridge is the last remaining span of the Pittsburgh Division line associated with Bollman. Around 1931, it was moved from Wills Creek to a location 1.5 miles (2.4 km) north of Meyersdale, Pennsylvania, after it was no longer able to safely carry heavier modern locomotives. It served as a vehicular bridge crossing CSX tracks on Long Road (Summit Township Road 381) at 39°49′48″N 79°02′34″W. The bridge was again relocated in 2007 to a location east of Meyersdale, where it now carries the Great Allegheny Passage trail over Scratch Hill Road at 39°49′06″N 78°59′41″W.

Though it was designed by Wendell Bollman, it does not employ his famous Bollman truss, but rather a Warren truss. It is 52 feet (16 m) long and 13 feet (4.0 m) tall. The east abutments are constructed of concrete, while the west are earthen with wood ties. This bridge has a wood deck, and ornate cast iron end pieces, lacework, and compression members. End posts and tension members are constructed of wrought iron.

The bridge was listed on the National Register of Historic Places on November 8, 1978.

== See also ==
- List of bridges documented by the Historic American Engineering Record in Pennsylvania
