= Mount Olivet Cemetery (Hanover, Pennsylvania) =

Historic cemetery in York County

- Interactive map of Mount Olivet Cemetery

Details
- Established: 1859
- Location: 725 Baltimore Street, Hanover, Pennsylvania 17331
- Country: United States
- Coordinates: 39.78830°N 76.97420°W
- Owned by: Mt. Olivet Cemetery Association
- No. of graves: 5,807+
- Website: Mt. Olivet Cemetery Association
- Find a Grave: Mount Olivet Cemetery

Mount Olivet Cemetery is a historical, non-denominational, pre-Civil War cemetery located in Hanover, Pennsylvania. The cemetery, located at 725 Baltimore Street is operated by the Mount Olivet Cemetery Association. A volunteer group, The Friends of Mount Olivet Cemetery, provides support to the cemetery staff and local organizations when the cemetery host events.

== History ==
Founded in 1859 as a non-profit, non-sectarian community cemetery governed by a Board of Managers who are elected each year and serve without remuneration. Management of cemetery grounds is by a Cemetery Manager, appointed by the Board of Managers, this manager is authorized to enforce all of the Cemetery's rules and regulations.

== Notable burials ==
- Joseph S. Gitt (1815-1901), civil engineer and railroad surveyor
- Colonel Richard McAllister (1725-1795), founder of Hanover, Revolutionary War Veteran
- Major William S. Diller (1842-1896) was Civil War Veteran with Company D, 76th Regiment.
- Mary Shaw Leader (1835-1913), a female journalist who reported on President Lincoln's Gettysburg Address
- John Luther Long (1855-1927) was a lawyer, playwright, novelist; creator of the short story that was the inspiration for 'Madame Butterfly.
- Colonel Henry Slagle (1735-1811) was an officer during the Revolutionary War and an upright citizen of Hanover
- John and William Hoffacker, John was the first local soldier to die on the first day of the Battle of Hanover, and their brother William died later resulting from injuries obtained from the Civil War
- Andrew R. Brodbeck (1860-1937), Politician, churchman, and businessman who served as U. S. Congressman between 1912-1914 and 1916-1918
- Lucy Forney-Bittinger (1859-1955), Deaconess of Presbyterian Church, missionary, and donor of the Forney-Bittinger Chapel at Mount Olivet Cemetery.
