= Joseph S. Gitt =

Pennsylvania engineer

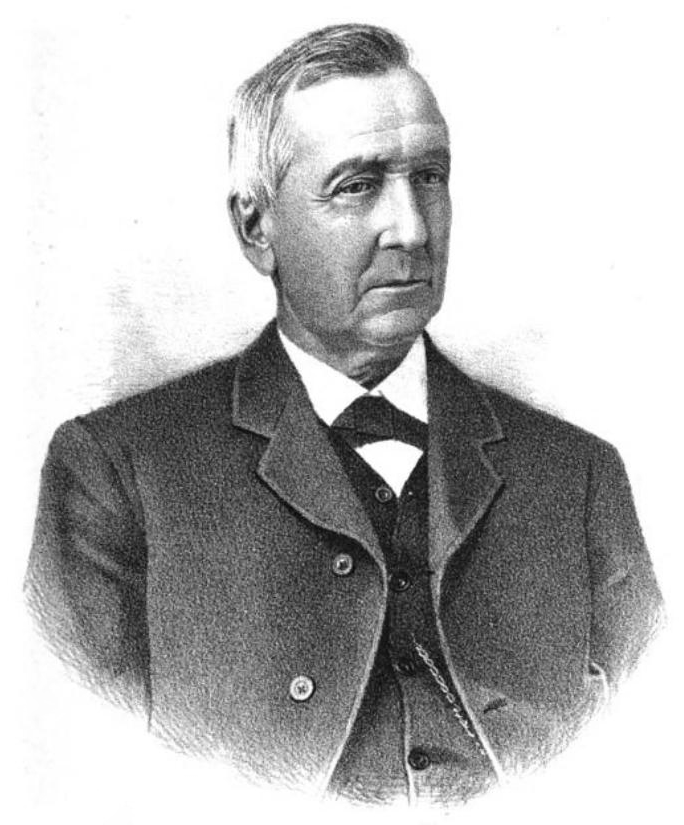
- Born: September 9, 1815; Adams County, Pennsylvania
- Died: January 22, 1901 (aged 85); New Oxford, Pennsylvania
- Burial place: Mount Olivet Cemetery
- Education: Gettysburg College
- Occupations: Engineer, surveyor, newspaper publisher, politician
- Spouse: Anna M Baughman (m. 1841)
- Children: 4

Signature
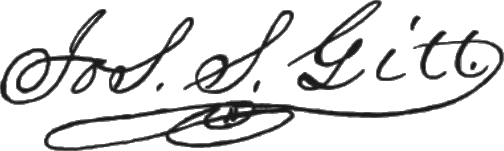

Joseph S. Gitt (September 9, 1815 – January 22, 1901) was a self-taught civil engineer and politician from Pennsylvania. After an unsuccessful career as a newspaper publisher, Gitt went back into railroading, estimating that in his career, he had conducted 31 different railroad surveys for a total distance of over 300 miles in his career Gitt either surveyed or engineered most of the railroads constructed in Frederick and Carroll County, Maryland and Adams county, Pennsylvania in the 1855-1885 period with the exception of the Civil War.

== Life ==
Joseph S Gitt was born on September 9, 1815, the oldest of the eleven children of Daniel (1793-1872) and Lydia Gitt (1797-1886) in Conowago township, Adams County, Pennsylvania. He studied at Gettysburg College (1835–36) receiving a degree of Fellow of Philosophy. He married on March 31, 1841, to Miss Anna M Baughman (1817-1898), daughter of David Baughman, of Hanover, Pennsylvania. They had four children, one of whom, Maria Louisa Gitt, married William Gardner Smyser (1845-1926), a civil engineer for the Santa Fe Railway living in Topeka, Kansas.

Gitt was a member of the Methodist Episcopal Church. In politics, he was a Democrat in his youth and later a Republican, as well as a Prohibitionist and a member of the Independent Order of Odd Fellows.

In 1862, Gitt was nominated by the Union party ticket for county surveyor. In 1895, Gitt was nominated by the local Prohibitionist party to run as county surveyor for Adams county, Pennsylvania.

== Newspaper work (1839 to 1851) ==
- 1839: Starts publication of the Hanover Herald in Hanover, Pennsylvania.
- 1842: Starts publication of another newspaper in Hanover, the Democrat, and changes that title in 1844 to the Planet and Weekly News which he sells and moves to Carlisle, Pennsylvania
- 1846: Starts publication of the Statesman, a self-labeled "democratic paper" and in 1847, changes that title to the American Democrat, and in turn closes the paper and moves back to Hanover.
- 1848: starts publishing the Regulator as well as managing a book store and bindery thru 1852.

== Surveyor ==
- 1836: Gitt worked as a rodman on the railroad surveys being conducted by Herman Haupt for locating the route of the "old tapeworm" (Gettysburg Rail Road) railroad near Gettysburg, Pennsylvania.
- Gitt was identified as the architect for the newly forming cemetery association in Hanover that he ultimately be buried in, namely Mount Olivet Cemetery.
- Gitt also conducted highway and local road surveys in his late career (circa 1880) as the Streets committee for the borough of New Oxford performs surveys and route locations for local roads and highways up to York Springs near Harrisburg, PA. he also performed work for the East Berlin, PA.
- Gitt mapped out the borough of New Oxford, Pennsylvania and produced a new plat map at its request identifying boundaries and streets.

== Railroad engineer ==
After being employed as a surveyor on earlier railroads, in 1851, Gitt became assistant engineer for the construction of the Hanover Branch railroad (later, consolidated under the name of Hanover Junction, Hanover & Gettysburg Railroad). Upon its completion in November, 1854 Gitt became chief engineer for the Philadelphia and West Chester Railroad.

=== Gettysburg Railroad ===
Gitt was engineer (of record) for the Gettysburg Railroad from 1855 to its opening on February 11, 1856. He then became chief engineer for the Littlestown Railroad, a line from Hanover to New Oxford in Pennsylvania which opened on January 6, 1858.

=== Western Maryland Railway ===
After the Civil War, Gitt surveyed and prepared cost estimates for the extension of the Western Maryland Rail Road Company from Union Bridge, Maryland its terminus in 1865 to Hagerstown, Maryland a route distance of 42.75 miles along the line of Pipe Creek towards Mechanicstown, Frederick County (known today as Thurmont, Maryland) proceeding on towards Sabillasville and from there in a southwesterly direction, Hagerstown at an estimated cost, net of right of way of $1.25 million in US$,1865.

Gitt in his report notes that he conducted reconnaissance and instrumental surveys for the road and had located the route from Union Bridge to (permanently to the Monocacy) Thurmont, east of the mountain, and from Mount Zion (permanently from Chewsville) to Hagerstown, west of the mountain as well as proposed branches to Emmittsburg, and up Friends' Creek to Mount Zion. Gitt noted that only twenty weeks were occupied in field service and 200 miles were surveyed. Gitt noted in his summary that only a portion of the line that could be considered "permanently located", namely from Union Bridge to Monocacy River, at the eastern end, and from Chewsville to Hagerstown, at the western end.

Gitt also recommended a bridge crossing for the Monocacy River 30 feet above its bed, requiring a truss bridge with two spans of 150 feet each connecting to wooden trestle work on the west shore of about 300 feet in length, and 15 feet high with masonry foundations up to the "high water" mark. Gitt also noted that some of the ravine crossings would be replaced with embankments within ten to twelve years. Bridge spans were required for Big Pipe Creek (100 feet), Little Pipe Creek and Antietam required spans of 80-90 feet and 60 feet for Owings Creek.

Gitt developed the cost estimate for the road assuming single track operation, iron rail at 52 pounds per yard, ties on 24-inch centers, a road bed base fourteen feet in width, with slopes of one foot and-a-half horizontal to each vertical for cuts or fills. The cost for right of way was not included in Gitt's estimate.

The ruling grade for Gitt's proposed route was 95 feet to the mile, or 1.8%.

=== Frederick and Pennsylvania Line Railroad ===
In 1867, Gitt located a route for the Frederick and Pennsylvania Line Railroad. Unlike the 1865 survey for the Western Maryland, Gitt made a fourteen-day reconnaissance in the field on horseback for the proposed road and did not supplement that information with instrumental surveys. The major feature of Gitt's proposed route was that from Woodsboro south into Frederick, it was located between the Woodsboro and Frederick Turnpike, now Maryland Route 194 and Israel creek. Aside from diverting in Walkersville, the road continued south along the eastern side of the turnpike, crossing over at the toll house and crossing the Monocacy just north of what is today Route 194 at Ceresville, Md. The first route south of Walkersville terminated opposite the Court House, at Church Street, in Frederick, Md. A second route started on the east-side and headed due north to Worman's mill and intercept the first line near the river crossing.

=== European and North American Railway ===
Gitt then briefly became chief engineer for the European and North American Railway from Bangor, Maine to New Brunswick, Canada for the extension from Saint John westward.

=== Emmitsburg Railroad ===
In 1868, Gitt returned to survey and locate the newly incorporated Emmitsburg Railroad.

In 1882, Gitt surveyed possible routes for the Round Top Branch which was an extension of the Gettysburg and Harrisburg Railroad from the Gettysburg borough across the Gettysburg Battlefield to Round Top, Pennsylvania.

== Death ==
On January 22, 1901, Gitt died in New Oxford, Adams County, Pennsylvania and was buried at Mount Olivet Cemetery in Hanover with the rites of the Odd Fellows.

== Legacy ==
Gitt estimated that in his career, he had conducted 31 different railroad surveys for a total distance of over 300 miles in his career Gitt either surveyed or engineered most of the railroads constructed in Frederick and Carroll County, Maryland and Adams County, Pennsylvania in the 1855-1885 period with the exception of the Civil War.

Five years after his death, Gitt was eulogized in the same paper as a man of means and a civil engineer of some repute who was willing to fore-go his work at any time to offer gratuitous support for public education for as the editor put it, "if there was one thing Joseph Gitt loved above all else, it was to write for the papers."
