= GE Technology Infrastructure =

- Company type: Subsidiary
- Industry: Aerospace; Health care Transportation
- Founded: 2008; 18 years ago
- Area served: Worldwide
- Key people: Jeff Immelt (CEO)
- Parent: General Electric
- Divisions: GE Aviation; GE Healthcare; GE Transportation
- Website: www.ge.com/products_services/directory/by_business.html

GE Technology Infrastructure was a business group of General Electric composed of three GE companies: GE Aviation, GE Healthcare, and GE Transportation. John G. Rice is president and CEO. A company-wide reorganization prompted by staggering financial losses led to the unit's formation in 2008 from companies within GE Infrastructure. In 2008, GE as a company announced that it will reduce its divisions from six to four. The main divisions will now be GE Technology Infrastructure, GE Energy Infrastructure, GE Capital and NBC Universal. The new structure emphasizes priorities that attempts to shield G.E. from economic swings by divesting it of consumer units and exploiting its role as one of the world's biggest buyers of IT services.

In addition, as a result of condensing down the divisions, the company aims to implement and call the cloud its new home. GE, the 123-year-old staple of the global industrial sector, is going all in on the cloud. The company plans to migrate 9,000 applications to public IaaS over the next three years. It is reducing its data centers from more than 30 to the single digits. GE is advocating for a simpler, more user-friendly approach to the world of IT. The whole point of the public cloud is that vendors – like AWS – provide those components as a service to customers. With this more public approach to a user-friendly service raises the concern for security. Randy Provoost, GE Technology Infrastructure marketing manager, put out a statement about how he plans to tackle and break down barriers with security systems in GE. Provoost focuses on the companies Open Protocol Exchange Network, or OPEN, and how by implementing it the GE company will achieve openness while enforcing principles and practices that will have above adequate security for the IT applications.
