= Walkersville Southern Railroad =

Railroad in Maryland, United States

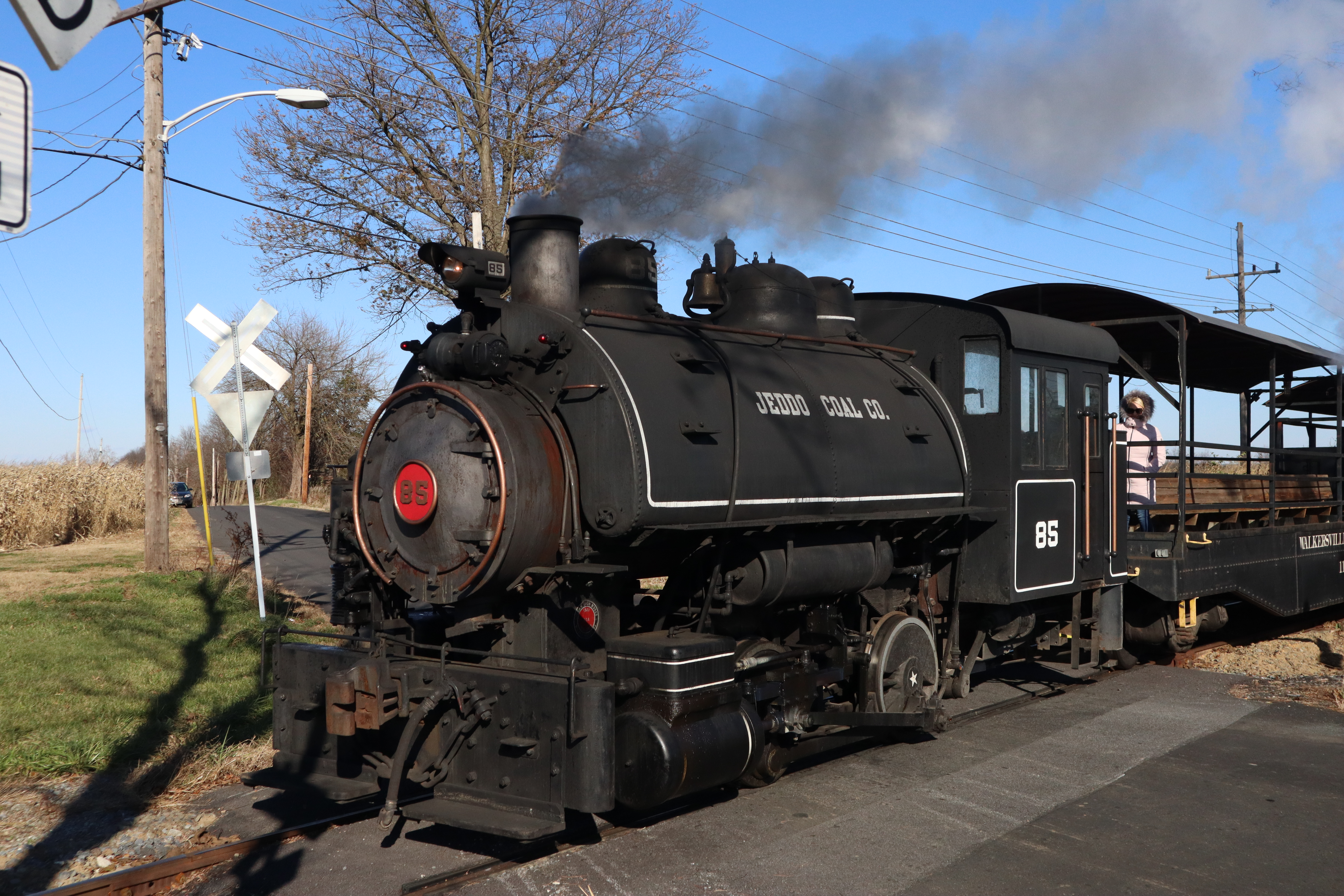
- Jeddo Coal 85 at the Retreat Road crossing

Overview
- Headquarters: Walkersville, Maryland
- Reporting mark: WS
- Locale: Frederick County, Maryland
- Dates of operation: 1997–present
- Predecessor: Penn Central Transportation Company

Technical
- Track gauge: 4 ft 8 1/2 in (1,435 mm) standard gauge
- Length: 6.72 miles (11 km)

Other
- Website: https://www.wsrr.org/

The Walkersville Southern Railroad is a 6.72 mile (11 km) heritage railway in Walkersville, Maryland. The railway runs between MP 60.0 south of Woodsboro, Maryland and MP 66.72 just north of the intersection of Maryland Route 26 and U.S. Route 15 near Frederick, Maryland (Using Pennsylvania Railroad (PRR) Milepost data where mileage ran north to south, and Frederick was at MP 69.0).

== History ==
=== Background ===
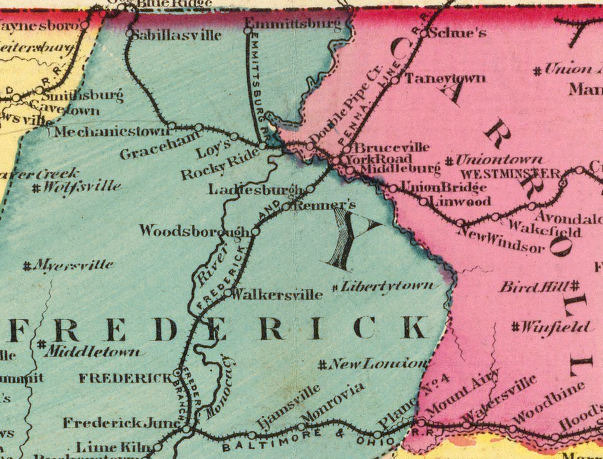
The line in 1873 used by the Frederick and Pennsylvania Line Railroad, which becomes the Walkersville Southern RR in 1997

The Walkersville Southern Railroad runs track and structures originally built by the Frederick and Pennsylvania Line Railroad Company. This railroad ran from Frederick, Maryland, to the Pennsylvania-Maryland State line, or Mason–Dixon line near Kingsdale, PA. Chartered in 1867, the railroad started construction in 1869 and cost $868,687.50 ($_{2025}=23,346,000). It opened on October 8, 1872 and was subsequently leased to the Pennsylvania Railroad from January 1, 1875, and in July of that year, PRR formed a new division, the Frederick division to operate the rail line. In the spring of 1896, it was liquidated in a judicial sale to the Pennsylvania Railroad for 10% of its 1896 book value. Pennsylvania reorganized the railroad in December 1896 as the Frederick and Northern Railroad Company. In March 1897, this new company was itself merged with other Pennsylvania-controlled railways (Littlestown Railroad Company and the Hanover and York Railroad Company) into the Hanover and York Railroad Company, chartered under the general laws of Pennsylvania and Maryland. In 1914, this railroad and the newly built Central Railroad of Maryland were then merged into the York, Hanover and Frederick Railway Company which remained a wholly owned stock subsidiary of the PRR into the creation of the Penndel Company on December 31, 1953 and then the Penn Central merger in 1968 and then bankruptcy in 1970. The Frederick and Pennsylvania Line segment was transferred to the State of Maryland in 1982 for unpaid taxes.

One of the industries that fed the railroad during its earliest time of operations was the Lime Kiln in Walkersville. This was among the industries that fueled the need of the railroad, to ship fertilizer to farmers in and around the Walkersville region. The Frederick Secondary remained in the control of the Pennsylvania Railroad even into the creation of the Penn Central Railroad. The Walkersville Southern operates on part of the Penn Central's Frederick Secondary. Penn Central, soon-to-be bankrupt, sold the line to the state of Maryland in 1972 after Hurricane Agnes washed out the bridge over the Monocacy River. The line remained dormant until 1980 when the Maryland Midland Railway began operations over the route between Walkersville north to Taneytown. South of Walkersville the right-of-way, devoid of freight customers, was overtaken by brush and weeds.

=== Restoration and expansion ===
Volunteers for the new Walkersville Southern began restoring the line in 1991. The State of Maryland awarded the company operation of the line south of Walkersville in 1993. Tourist trains began running in 1997. The bridge was rebuilt, completed in March 1993, and trains began crossing the river, 20 years after Agnes. In 1998, the line was rebuilt to its current terminus at Maryland Route 26 in Frederick. Although crossing Maryland Route 26 was in the original plan to reach potential freight customers in downtown Frederick, the rise in automobile traffic over Route 26 and the departure of potential customers from Frederick led to the eventual abandonment of any further restoration plans into the city. Current local government plans call for the old right-of-way south of Route 26 to be converted into a hiker-biker trail.

In November 2008, Maryland granted rights to operate three miles of right-of-way to the north, linking to the Maryland Midland Railway at North Glade Road. In 2013 the summer steam excursion was routed over a portion of the newly restored track. As of the January 1st, 2014 the north division has been restored.

In late 2011, the Walkersville Southern railroad acquired a "rare" engine built in 1949. Unplanned restoration, including finding the right batteries, delayed the engine from running on the railway.

On August 6, 2025, new railroad signals and upgraded crossings were added along the Walkersville Southern Railroad. Pedestrian improvements to the station were made with new crosswalks and ADA-accessible sidewalks. These upgrades costed one million dollars.

== Operations ==
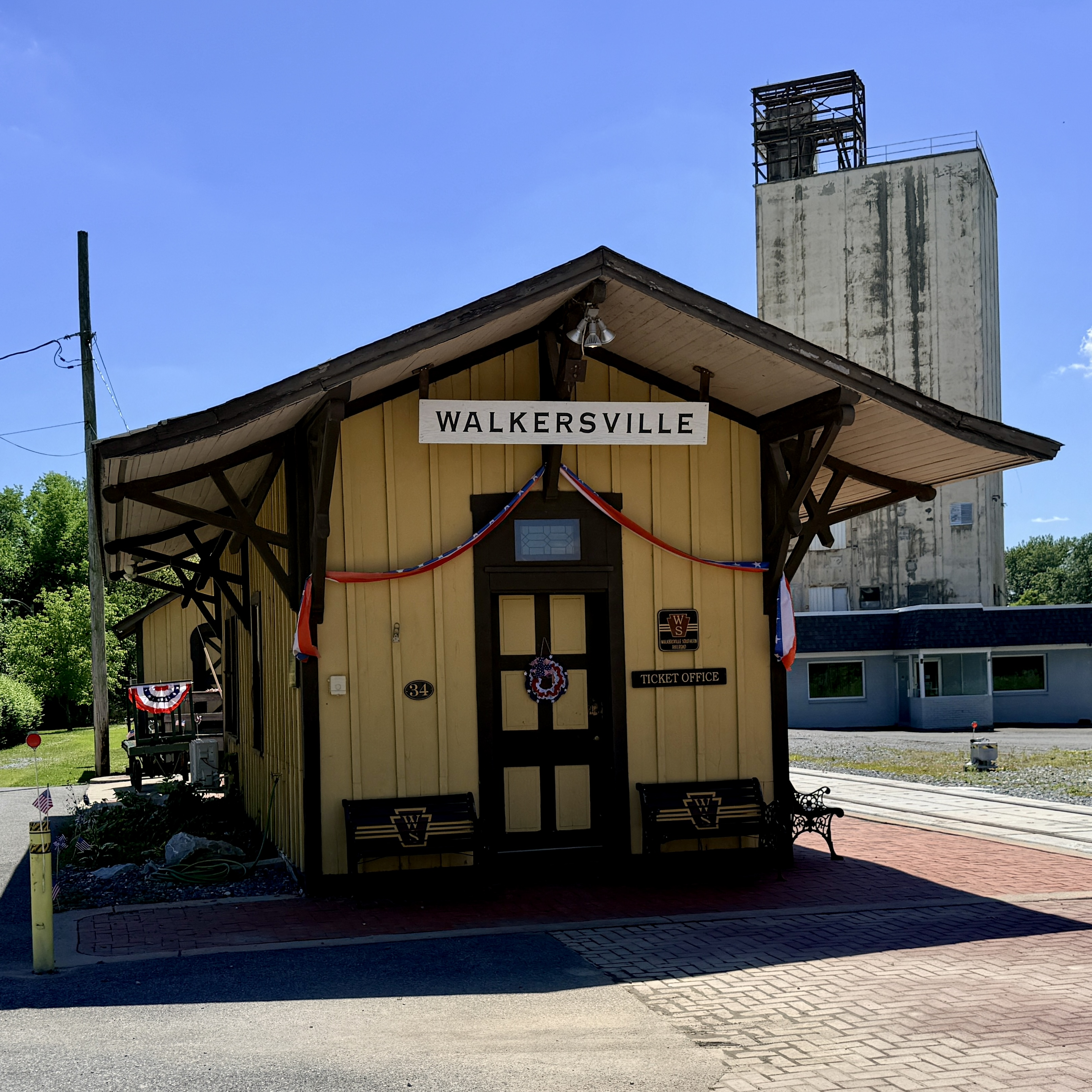
Walkersville station

The railroad operates out of the train station in Walkersville. Today, the railroad runs two to three round trips daily on Saturdays and Sundays in May, June, September, and October; and on Saturdays only in July and August. They also host some special events, including some on weekends and during the off-season such as a railfan trip with a visiting steam tank engine, or Santa trains during the Christmas season. In some cases individuals with their own equipment can use the right of way with prior permission or during selected special events.

The railroad typically operates unique industrial diesel locomotives, all rarely seen in today's modern railroading. In 2012, the railroad operated steam excursions for the first time using the Gramling Locomotive Works "Flagg Coal 75" an 0-4-0T tank engine. The 75's operation marked the first time a steam locomotive had operated on this railway since the Pennsylvania Railroad last ran steam over 60 years ago. In 2013, steam returned in the form of Lehigh Valley Coal 126, also owned by the Gramling family. In 2018, after the addition of Crossing Signals the railroad turned to Jeddo Coal 85, also owned by the GLW, due to 126's blind axle causing problems with the activation devices at the crossing.

== Equipment ==
=== Diesel locomotives ===
| Number | Builder | Type | Date | Status | Note |
|---|---|---|---|---|---|
| WSRR 1 | Plymouth Locomotive Works | 18-ton switcher | 1941 | Display | Formerly operated by the Wilmington & Western Railroad |
| WSRR 2 | Davenport Locomotive Works | 25-ton switcher | 1939 | Operational; MOW locomotive | Built on steam switcher frame, former Richmond Port switcher |
| WSRR 3 | Davenport Locomotive Works | 20-ton switcher | 1942 | Unrestored | Formerly US Army 7707 at Fort Holabird, MD, during WW II |
| ex-WMSR #7 | Plymouth Locomotive Works | Plymouth CR4 | 1960 | Operational | Originally from J&L Steel, went to Mount Union Connecting Railroad then Western Maryland Scenic Railroad |
| ex-AFC #9 | General Electric Transportation | 45-ton switcher | June 1943 | Operational | Originally built for the US Navy; Migrated to the American Car and Foundry Company (ACF), Milton, PA; owned by Jamie Haislip. |
| ex-DGVR 45 | General Electric Transportation | 45-ton switcher | June 1943 | Operational | Formerly US Army 7496 at the Army Air Forces Depot, Orlando, FL, during WW II; was owned and operated by the Durbin and Greenbrier Valley Railroad; Is owned by Al Leyh |
| ex-GN #5201 | General Electric Transportation | 44-ton switcher | 1940 | Under Restoration | Formerly Great Northern; believed to be the oldest survivor of its type; owned by Jamie Haislip. |
| USAX 7954 | Electro-Motive Division | EMD Model 40 | August 1942 | Operational | One of only 11 EMD Model 40 locomotives built in total; built as USAX 7954, to Sanderson & Porter Construction (contractors for West Penn Power), to Hagerstown Roundhouse Museum, and renumbered 101. Transferred to Walkersville in 2002, and restored to its USAX livery in 2026. |
| PRR 9331 | General Electric Transportation | 45-ton switcher | 1948 | Operational | Originally PRR equipment, later owned by the Strasburg Rail Road from the 1960s to 2013; owned by Jamie Haislip. Made its public return to operation on October 9, 2021. |
| PRR 9339 | General Electric Transportation | 44-ton switcher | 1948 | Operational | Originally PRR equipment, later owned by the South Carolina Railroad Museum 33; owned by Jamie Haislip. |
| ex-Marion Industrial Center 45 | General Electric Transportation | 45-ton switcher | January 1944 | Operational | Built as USAX 8538, used overseas in Iran during WWII; was renumbered to #5182 at MIC; Purchased from the Marion Industrial Center in Marion County, Ohio in June 2021. Renumbered from 45 to 4 to avoid confusion with ex-DGVR 45; owned by Jamie Haislip. |
| WSRR 396 | General Electric Transportation | GE 25-Ton Switcher | 1937-1938 (?) | Operational; MOW locomotive | Built as USAX 1164, worked at Cargail Plant in Buffalo, Iowa. |
| USAX 7079 | General Electric Transportation | 65-ton switcher | April 1941 | Operational | Built for the US Army, then worked on the Black River & Western Railroad, and the West Chester Railroad (renumbered as WCLR 9); being restored to USAX 7079 |

=== Rolling stock ===
| Type | Quantity | Builder | Status | Note |
|---|---|---|---|---|
| Open excursion car | Two cars; #10 and #11 | Unknown. #11 ex-B&O, #10 ex-WVN | Both cars operational | Primarily found on summer trains |
| LIRR P54D | Five cars | American Car and Foundry | Four cars are fully operational. One lettered "Ligonier Valley." Three used in passenger service, one used as a dining car, and one under restoration. Some are privately owned. | Used year-round; formerly owned and operated by the Long Island Rail Road between 1908 and 1972. Numbers #7048, #7091, #7099, #7128, #7134 (named Southhampton) |
| Troop Sleeper #7478 | One car | Pullman-Standard | Operational | Used on the dinner train, serving as a kitchen car; repainted Dark Green to match Dinner Train Consist in 2022, originally painted in WSRR Colors and numbered 12; ex-WM car, originally US Army in World War II |
| Solarium Observation Car | One car | Pullman-Standard | Operational | Part of the dinner train consist; was operated on the Southern Pacific Lark train |
| RF&P Caboose 923 | One car | International Car Company in Kenton, Ohio | Operational | Used with all excursion trains; originally owned by the Richmond, Fredericksburg and Potomac Railroad and also used in pool service on the Seaboard Coast Line Railroad. Owned by the Chesapeake Railway Association. |
| Wabash C-17 Caboose 2827 | One car | Decatur (OH) Shops, Wabash Railroad | Operational | Used with dinner trains and owned by the Chesapeake Railway Association. |
| PRR N5 caboose 477532 | One car | Unknown | Operational, not used for public, Undergoing Interior Restoration | Owned by Joshua Meise. |

The Pullman solarium car, named the Meadow Lark, was donated to the Chesapeake Railway Association and later turned over to the WS, which continues to restore it. The railroad uses it on dinner trains as a dressing room for dinner theater actors and as a mount for a generator (attached to the car's underside) for providing electrical power to the train. In addition to the RF&P 923 and Wabash 2827 cabooses hosted for the CRA, the railroad also hosts a number of private equipment for multiple individuals. For example, there is a privately owned PRR N5 in the yard.

Also operated by Walkersville Southern, but not used in revenue service, are an ex-US Navy ammunition box car, used as a shop car, and two Ballast hopper cars used for MOW (also a part of the trade for ex-WMSR 7), one of which is painted in Western Maryland livery while the other was recently repainted in PRR colors. All are privately owned.

=== Walkersville Southern Railroad Museum ===
The railroad has a small museum in the former Glade Valley Milling Company building across the street from the 1890s Walkersville Depot. The museum contains railroad artifacts and a model railroad.

=== Misc. ===
The Maryland Midland Railway hosted special excursions prior to the formation of the WS. These were the last passenger operations until 1993.

The WSRR has two divisions, the North Division and the South Division. These divisions are from the train yard until the end of the line in their respective cardinal directions.

== See also ==
- List of heritage railroads in the United States
- List of Maryland railroads
