= Tuscarora Creek (Monocacy River tributary) =

Tributary of the Monocacy River in Frederick County, Maryland, U.S.

Coordinates: 39.458713°N 77.373874°W

Tuscarora Creek is a 7.7-mile-long (12.4 km) tributary of the Monocacy River in Frederick County, Maryland, in the United States.

The creek rises at the eastern base of Catoctin Mountain, about 6.5 miles (10.5 km) north-northwest of the city of Frederick, and flows southeast about to its mouth at the Monocacy. The creek's watershed area is 15.28 square miles (39.6 km^{2}).

== Environmental impacts on the creek ==
The Maryland Department of the Environment (MDE) has identified water quality violations for Tuscarora Creek, specifically for bacteria, based on testing of water samples. MDE estimates that the principal sources of bacteria are farm animals (livestock), failing septic tanks from residences and/or businesses, pet waste and wildlife. The White Rock sewage treatment plant also discharges to the creek, but the MDE report does not cite the plant for excessive discharges. About one-third of the creek's bacteria wasteload is of unknown origin.

The Maryland Department of Natural Resources, in a separate report, identified highly eroded stream banks, barriers to fish passage, trash dumping sites and other problems in portions of Tuscarora Creek and its tributaries. These problems are associated with land development (urbanization) in the region.

== See also ==
- Tuscarora Creek (Potomac River)
- List of rivers of Maryland
- Tuscarora Creek railroad bridge
