= GE Infrastructure =

- Type: Division
- Industry: Infrastructure
- Founded: 2005; 21 years ago
- Defunct: 2008
- Fate: Reorganization of GE subsidiaries
- Successors: GE Technology Infrastructure; GE Energy Infrastructure
- Key people: John G. Rice (president and CEO)

GE Infrastructure was a subsidiary of General Electric, formed in 2005 as part of a company-wide reorganization under CEO Jeff Immelt, until it was split apart into GE Technology Infrastructure and GE Energy Infrastructure in another reorganization in 2008. The president and CEO of GE Infrastructure, John G. Rice, was transferred to GE Technology Infrastructure.

When it was active, business units making up GE Infrastructure included:

- GE Aviation (relocated to GE Technology Infrastructure)
- GE Commercial Aviation Services (relocated to GE Capital)
- GE Energy (relocated to GE Energy Infrastructure)
- GE Energy Financial Services (relocated to GE Capital)
- GE Oil and Gas (relocated to GE Energy Infrastructure)
- GE Transportation Systems (relocated to GE Technology Infrastructure)
- GE Water & Process Technologies (relocated to GE Energy Infrastructure)
