= Woodsboro and Frederick Turnpike Company Tollhouse =

- U.S. National Register of Historic Places
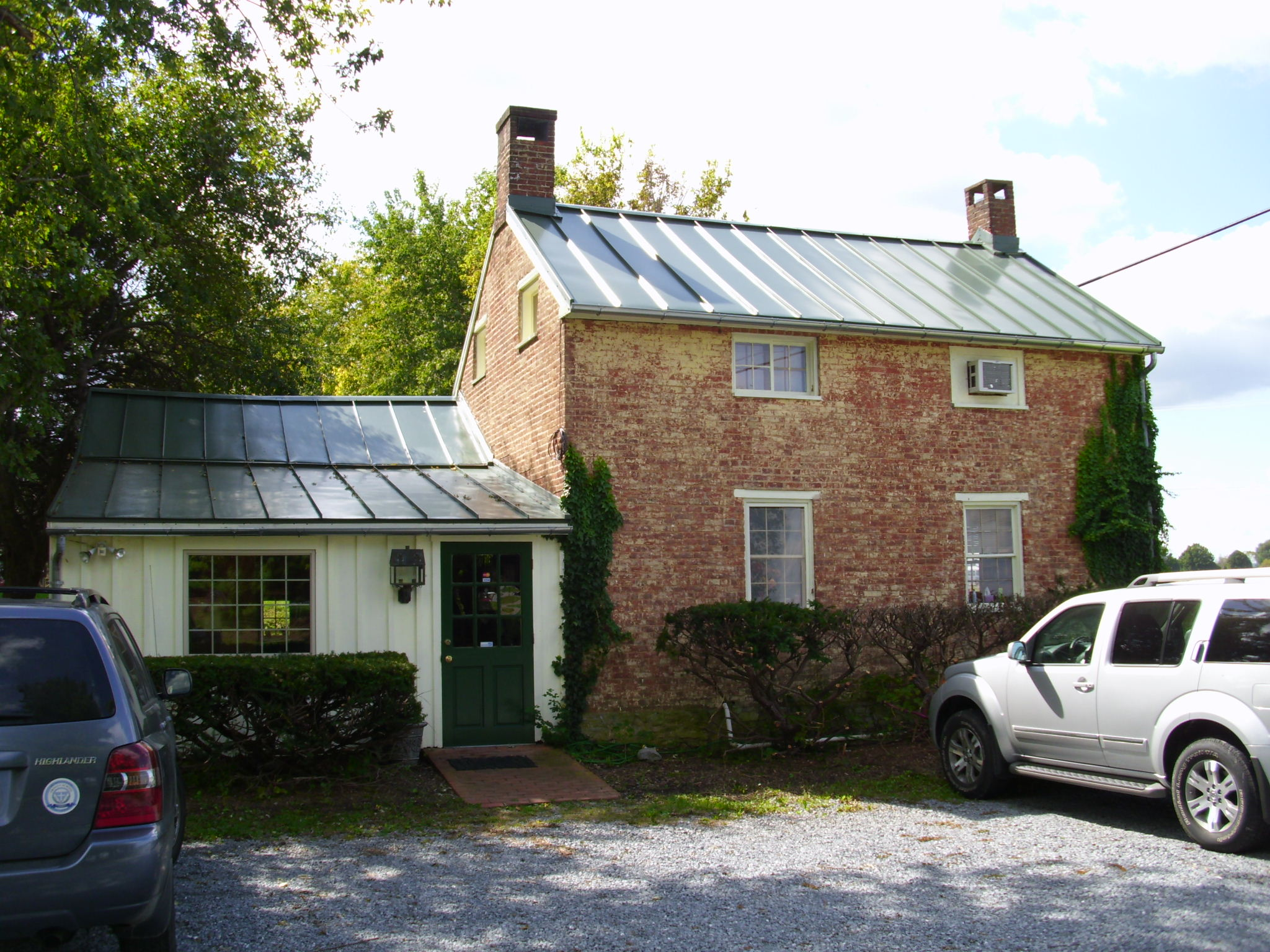

- Location within Maryland Location within the United States
- Location: 8505 Woodsboro Pike (MD 194), Walkersville, Maryland
- Coordinates: 39°28′2″N 77°21′45″W
- Area: 0.2 acres (0.081 ha)
- Built: 1850
- NRHP reference No.: 79003276
- Added to NRHP: September 24, 1979

The Woodsboro and Frederick Turnpike Company Tollhouse is a historic toll house located at Walkersville, Frederick County, Maryland, United States. It is a two-story brick structure over a stone foundation, with a small interior end chimney at each gable end. It was used as a tollhouse by the Woodsboro and Frederick Turnpike Company.

The Woodsboro and Frederick Turnpike Company Tollhouse was listed on the National Register of Historic Places in 1979.
