= Wendel Bollman =

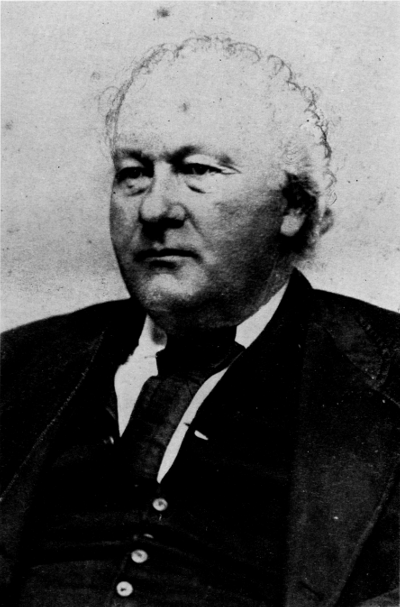
Wendel Bollman

Wendel Bollman (January 21, 1814 – 1884) was an American self-taught civil engineer, best known for his iron railway bridges. Only one of his patented "Bollman truss" bridges survives, the Bollman Truss Railroad Bridge in Savage, Maryland. The Wells Creek Bollman Bridge near Meyersdale, Pennsylvania is also standing, although that bridge uses the Warren truss system.

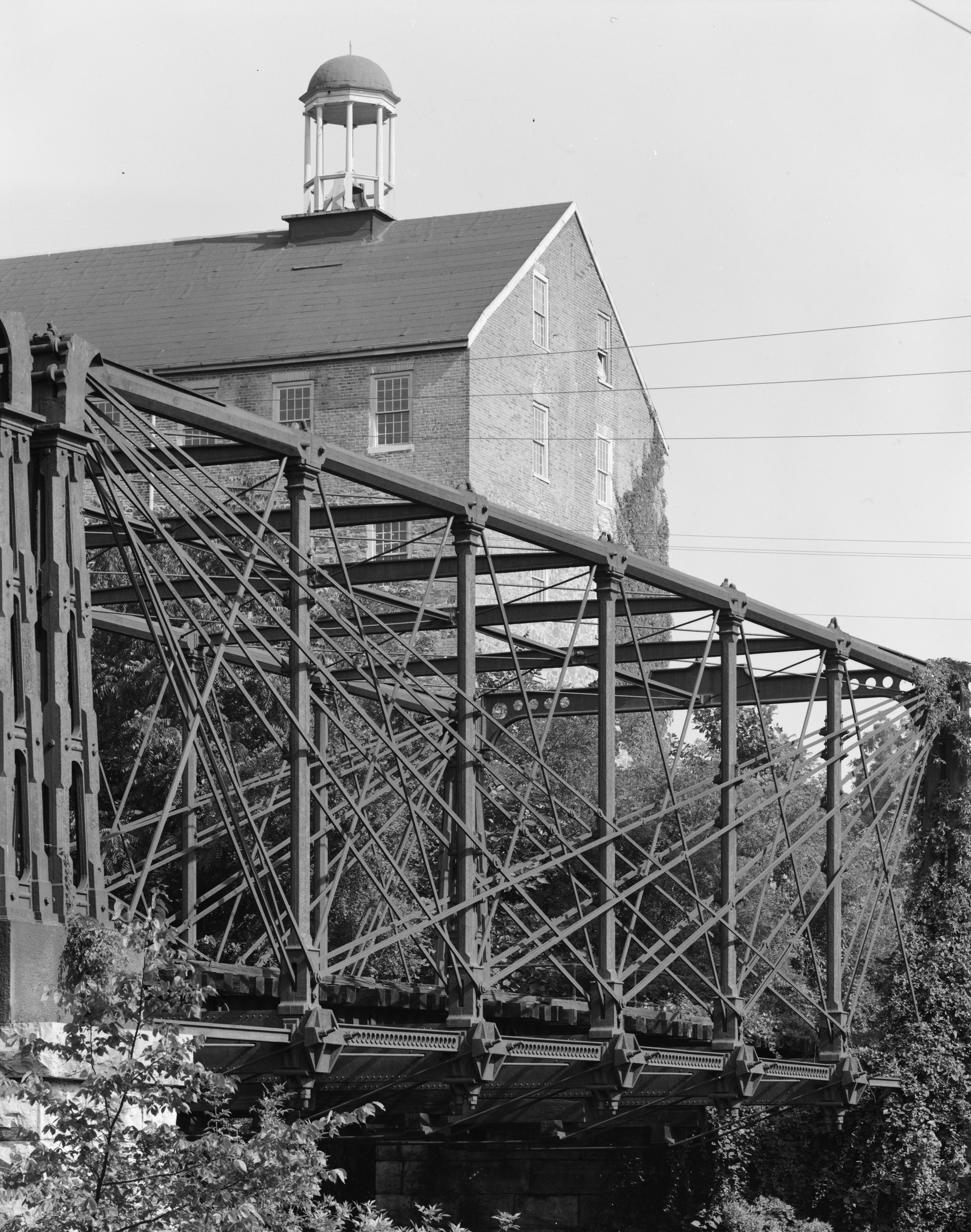
Bollman Truss Railroad Bridge at Savage, Maryland in 1970

== Early life and career ==
Bollman was born in Baltimore, Maryland to German immigrants, and was the seventh of eight children. His father died when Wendell was 11, and he quit school to support his family. Bollman began his career with the Baltimore and Ohio Railroad (B&O) as a carpenter in 1828, just as the B&O began laying track. He left shortly thereafter to build houses. During this period he married Ann Smith; the couple would have 10 children. In 1837 he returned to the B&O as a carpenter, but was soon promoted to line foreman by Benjamin H. Latrobe, II. Although the early B&O bridges in central Maryland were stone arch types (the Thomas Viaduct is perhaps the most impressive), wood bridges became common on the line west of Harpers Ferry, Virginia, and Bollman began to design some of them. In 1848 he was made responsible for all bridges on the line. Noticing that wooden bridges had a life-span of only about 10 years, he began looking at using iron for his bridges. At that time railroads made limited use of iron bridges. After a failure of an iron bridge on the New York and Erie in 1849, that railroad stopped using them.

== Bridge designs ==
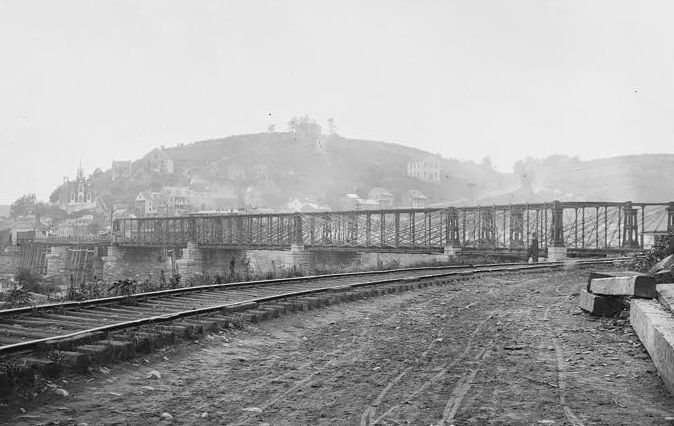
Bollman's Harpers Ferry Bridge circa 1862

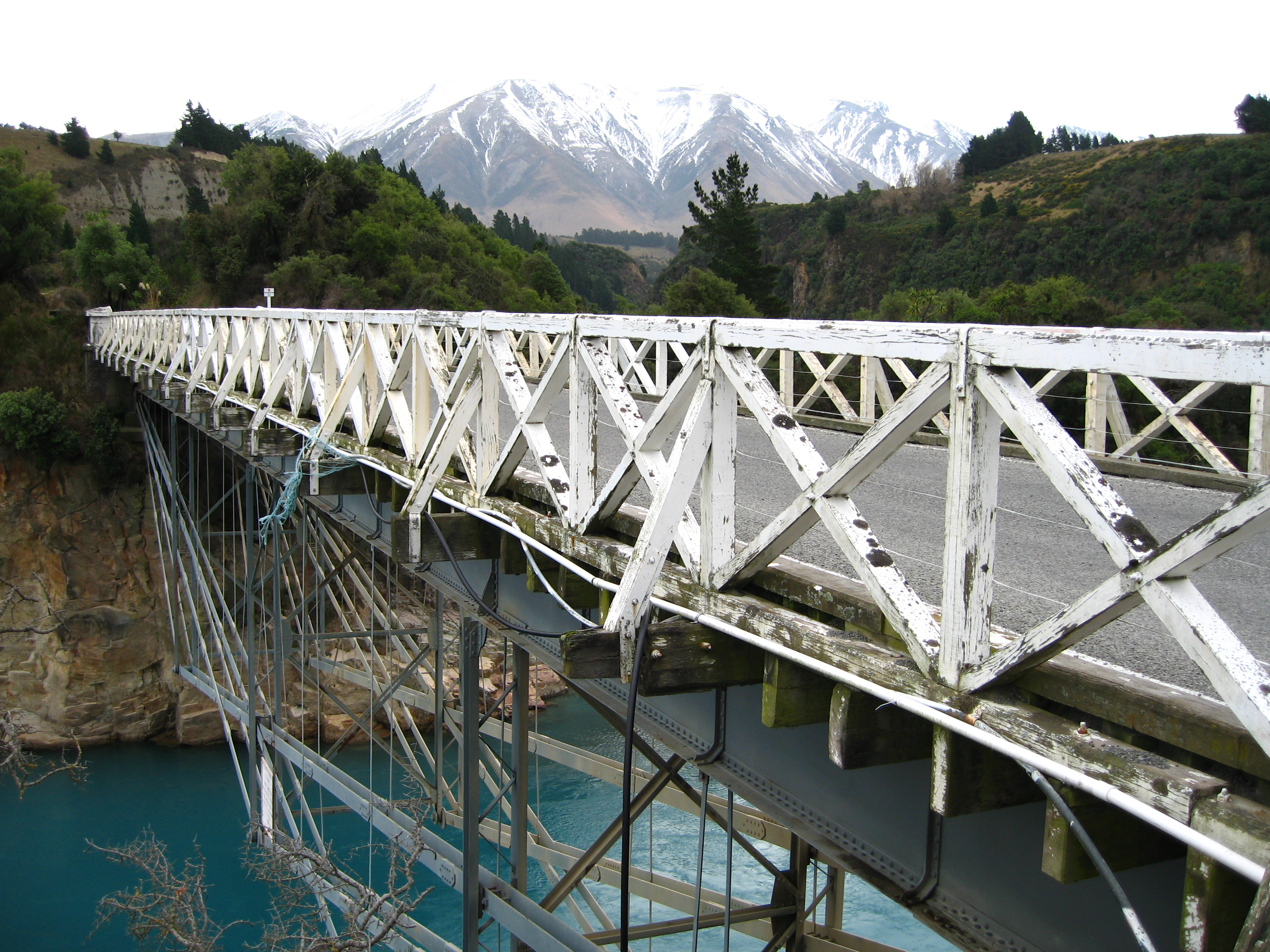
Old Rakaia Gorge Bridge in New Zealand

Bollman began working on a new truss configuration for iron bridges, and in 1849 Latrobe found it acceptable for use on two of the B&O's shorter spans. In 1851 Bollman replaced the 124-foot (37.8 m) wooden bridge at Harpers Ferry. This would become his most famous bridge and was rebuilt many times using his system during the American Civil War (it came under frequent enemy fire). Bollman used the idea of redundancy of members so that his truss systems did not fail. Although abstract theory was often used to design bridges during this time period, Bollman used math and modeling instead.

Bollman's Bridge Patent (1852)

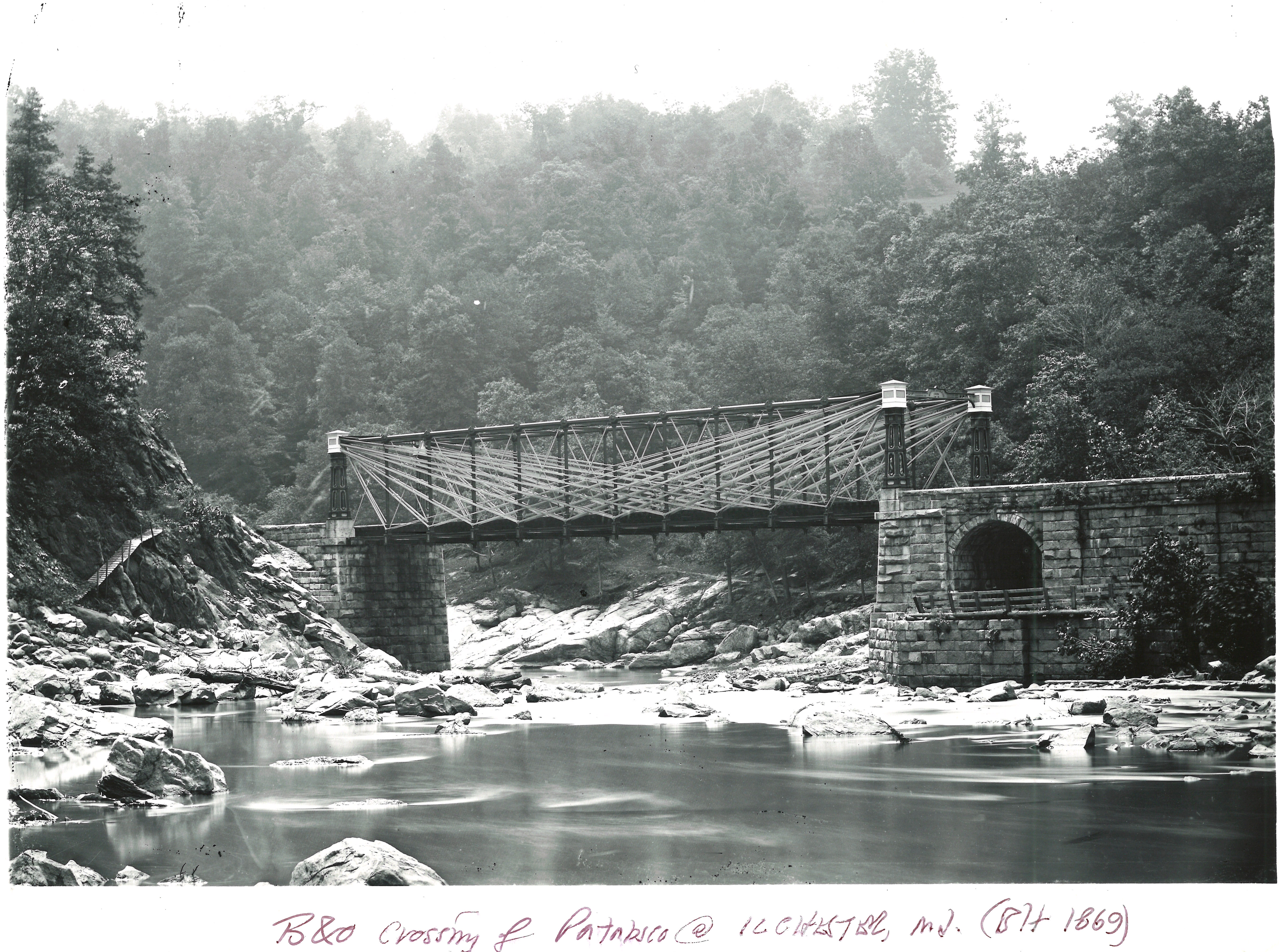
Ilchester, Maryland, Bollman truss bridge over Patapsco River. The bridge was destroyed by a flood.

On January 6, 1852, Bollman was awarded patent No. 8,624 for his unique design known as the "Bollman truss." He left the B&O and founded W. Bollman and Company in 1858 with his partners John Clark and John H. Tegmeyer. The B&O continued to contract with him for bridge design. Not all his designs used the Bollman truss. W. Bollman and Company dissolved about 1863, but two years later Bollman founded Patapsco Bridge and Iron Works which lasted until his death in 1884. His companies built bridges in Cuba, Mexico, and Chile, as well as the eastern United States.

Although far more durable than the wooden bridges they replaced, most of Bollman's bridges have not survived. This is due to changes in railroad equipment, rather than their construction. New technologies for making inexpensive steel in the late 19th century made its use in railroad bridges practical. Steel bridges could carry heavier locomotives and soon wrought and cast iron bridges became obsolete; the iron was easily recycled. The Savage bridge survives because it was on an industrial spur for a mill that closed in 1947. The Meyersdale bridge was moved and converted into a road bridge around 1910. It was moved a second time in 2007 to have a new life on the Great Allegheny Passage at milepost 30.5. The Harpers Ferry Bridge was destroyed in a flood in March 1936.

Bollman is important not only because he was perhaps the most successful of the latter (self taught engineers) class, but because he was probably also the last. He may be said to be a true representative of the transitional period between intuitive and exact engineering.

— Frank Griggs, Jr.

The Old Rakaia Gorge Bridge in New Zealand's South Island from 1882 utilized the Bollman truss design and is registered as a Category I heritage item with Heritage New Zealand.

== See also ==
- B & O Railroad Potomac River Crossing
- Mount Clare Shops - B&O Railroad
- Frederick and Pennsylvania Line Railroad Company - Bollman built four bridges for the railroad in 1871-1872.
