= Savage Mill Historic District =

Historic district in Maryland, United States

- U.S. National Register of Historic Places
- U.S. Historic district
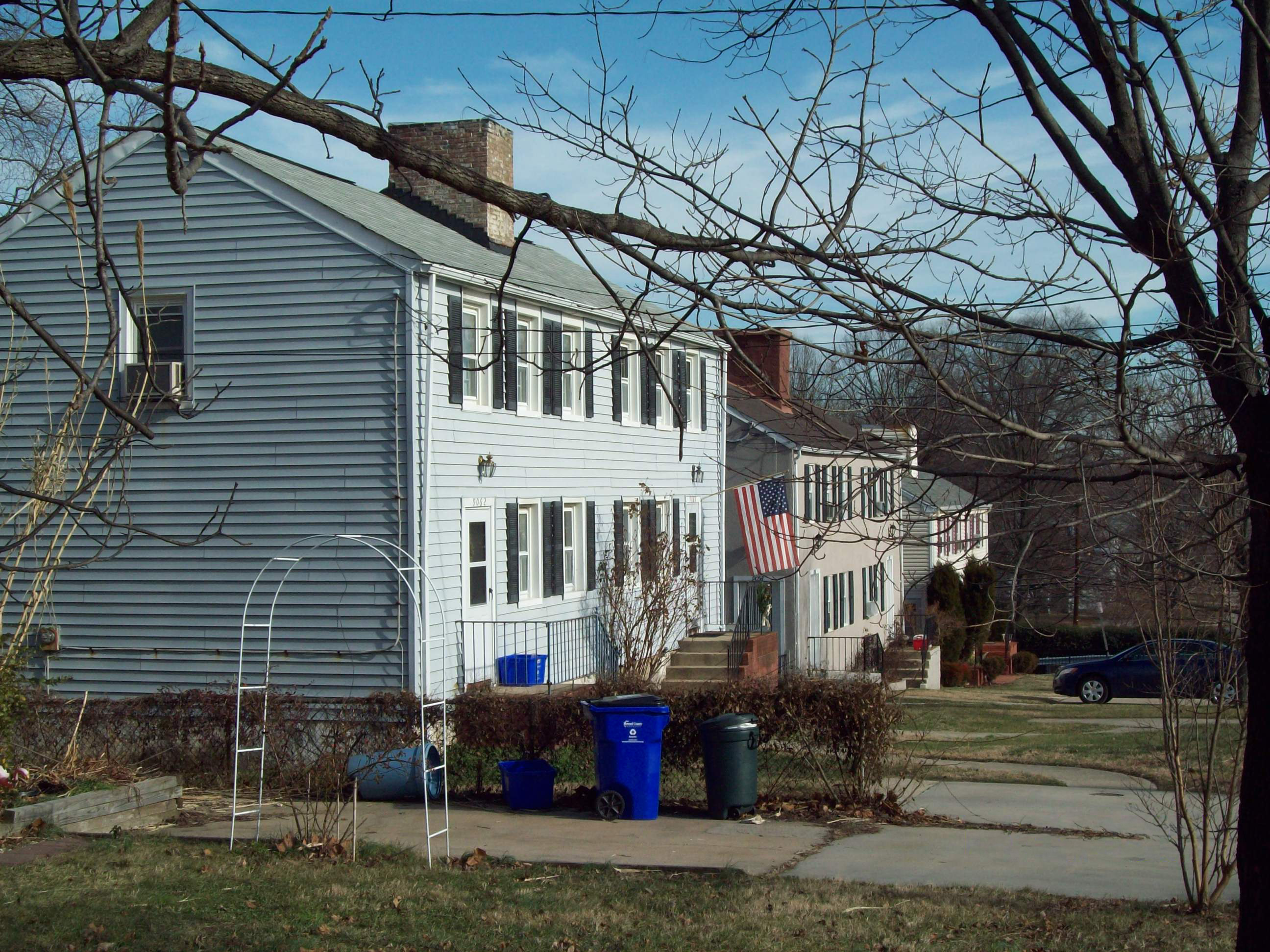
- Savage Mill Workers Housing, December 2008

- Location within Maryland Location within the United States
- Location: N of Little Patuxent River off U.S. 1, Savage, Maryland
- Coordinates: 39°8′12″N 76°49′38″W
- Area: 50 acres (20 ha)
- Built: 1822
- Architectural style: Late Victorian, Federal
- NRHP reference No.: 75000905
- Added to NRHP: February 20, 1975

The Savage Mill Historic District is a national historic district located at Savage, Howard County, Maryland. The district comprises the industrial complex of Savage Mill and the village of workers' housing to the north of the complex.

The site of Savage Mill on the rapids of the Little Patuxent River had been used for mill operations since the early 18th century. The district was part of a land grant named Ridgeley's Forest, surveyed in 1685 by Colonel Henry Ridgley. In 1750, Alexander Warfield built a mill along the river which was eclipsed by a larger construction chartered in 1812 by the Williams Brothers. By 1825, the mill employed 200 people including women and children, and 120 power looms for the production of cotton duck. The complex included several additions: a grist mill, an iron foundry, and a machine shop. The company was sold to William H. Baldwin, Jr. in 1847, who owned a Baltimore dry goods firm. In the early 20th century, the company became Baldwin, Leslie and Company, and the mill was expanded. A decade later the Baldwin family erected a stone community hall for the town and constructed a large group of tenant houses. From 1923 to 1941 the Carroll Baldwin Memorial Community Hall served as a movie theatre. For a brief period, the Maryland State Police set up a barracks in 1927-1929 leased from the Savage Manufacturing Company before relocating to Waterloo. By 1941 the company employed 325 people, and during World War II, produced 400,000 pounds of cotton duck a month. In 1948 the mill closed, and in the 1950s it spent a brief period being used to manufacture Christmas ornaments before closing permanently and converted for commercial use.

It was listed on the National Register of Historic Places in 1975.

== See also ==
- List of Howard County properties in the Maryland Historical Trust
- Commodore Joshua Barney House
- Savage Mill
- Savage Mill Trail
- Bollman Truss Railroad Bridge

== Gallery ==
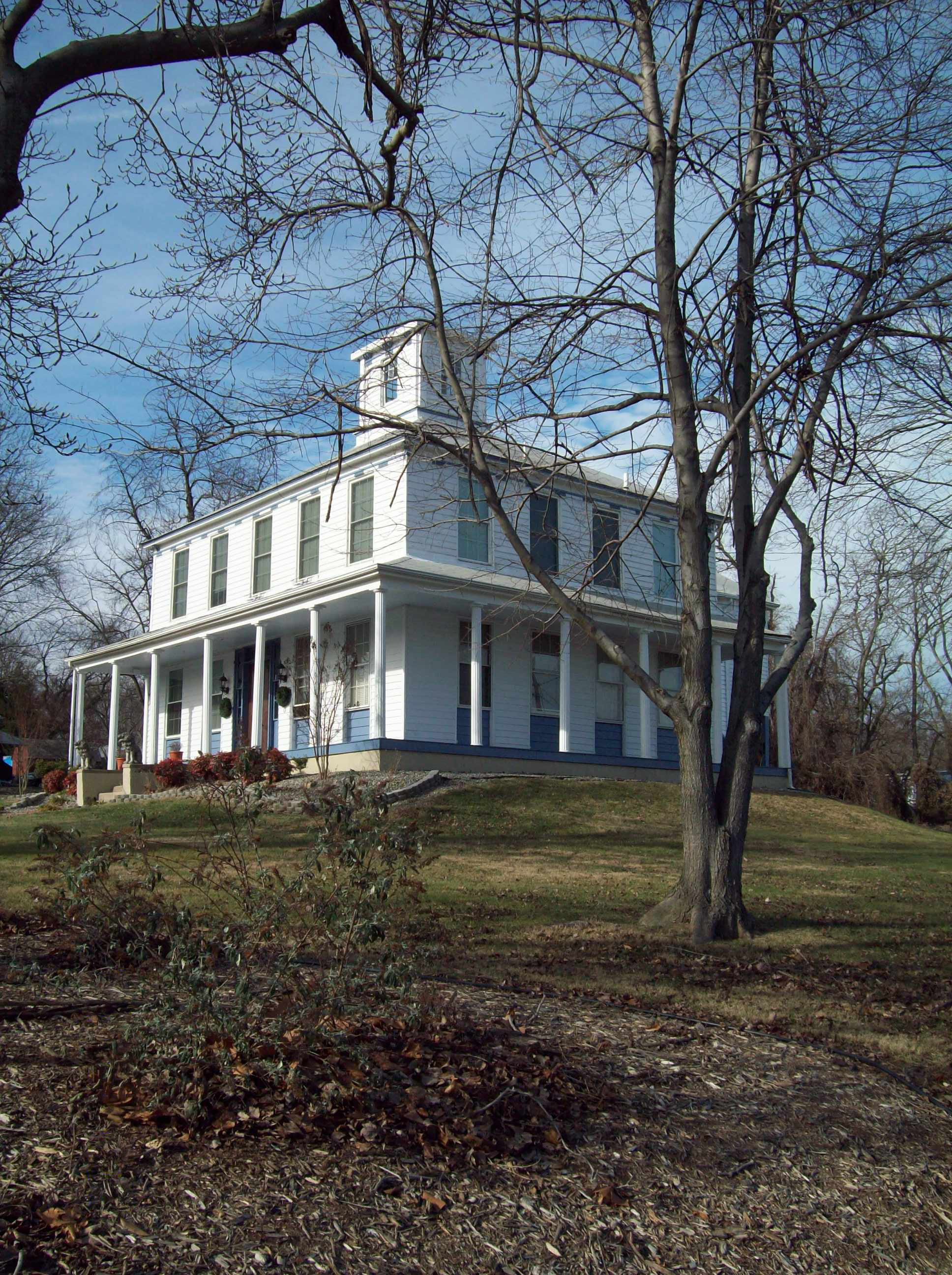
The 1859 Mansion House also went by Company House, or Proprietor House for William H. Baldwin.

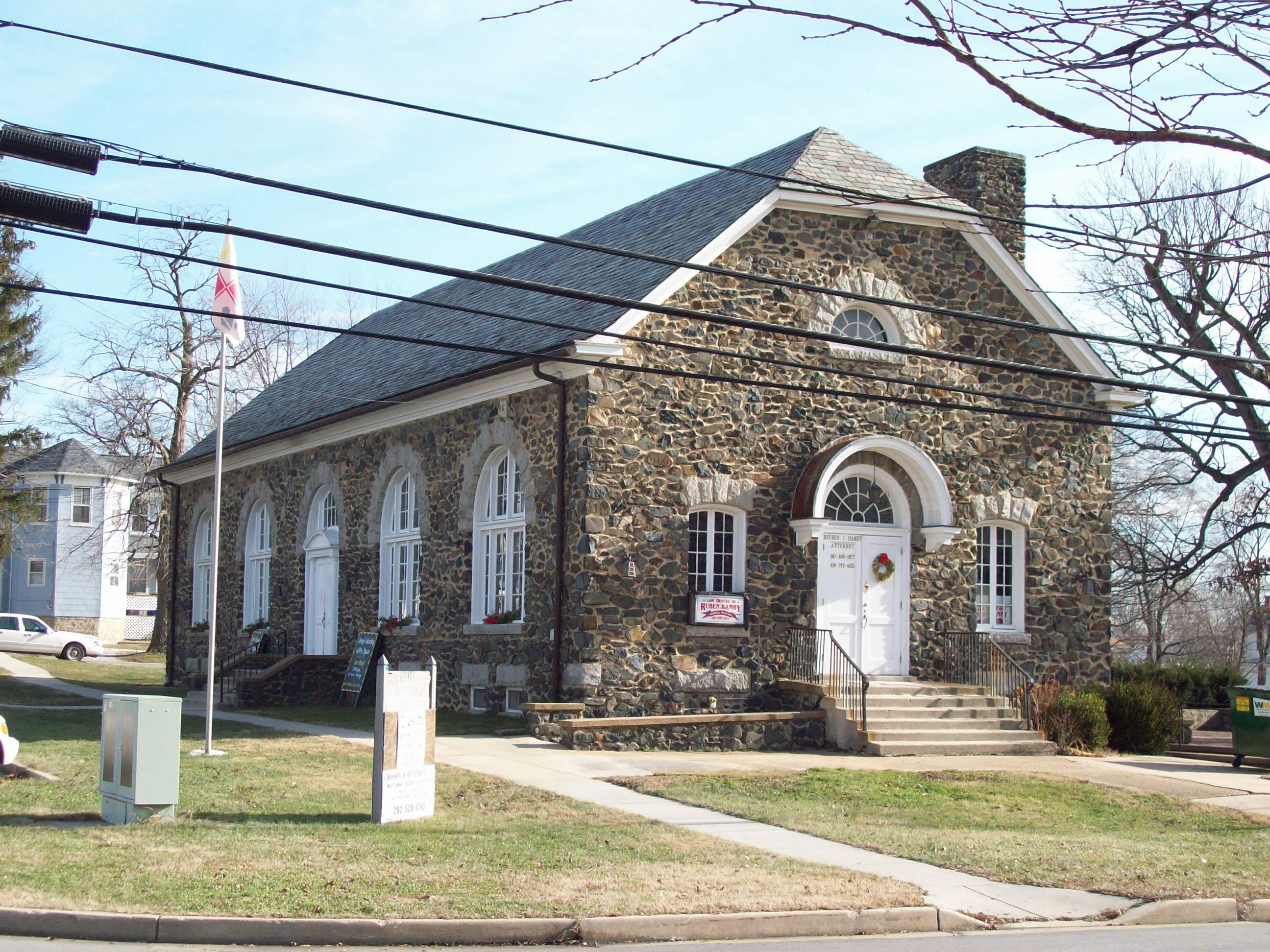
Savage Mill Community Building, December 2008

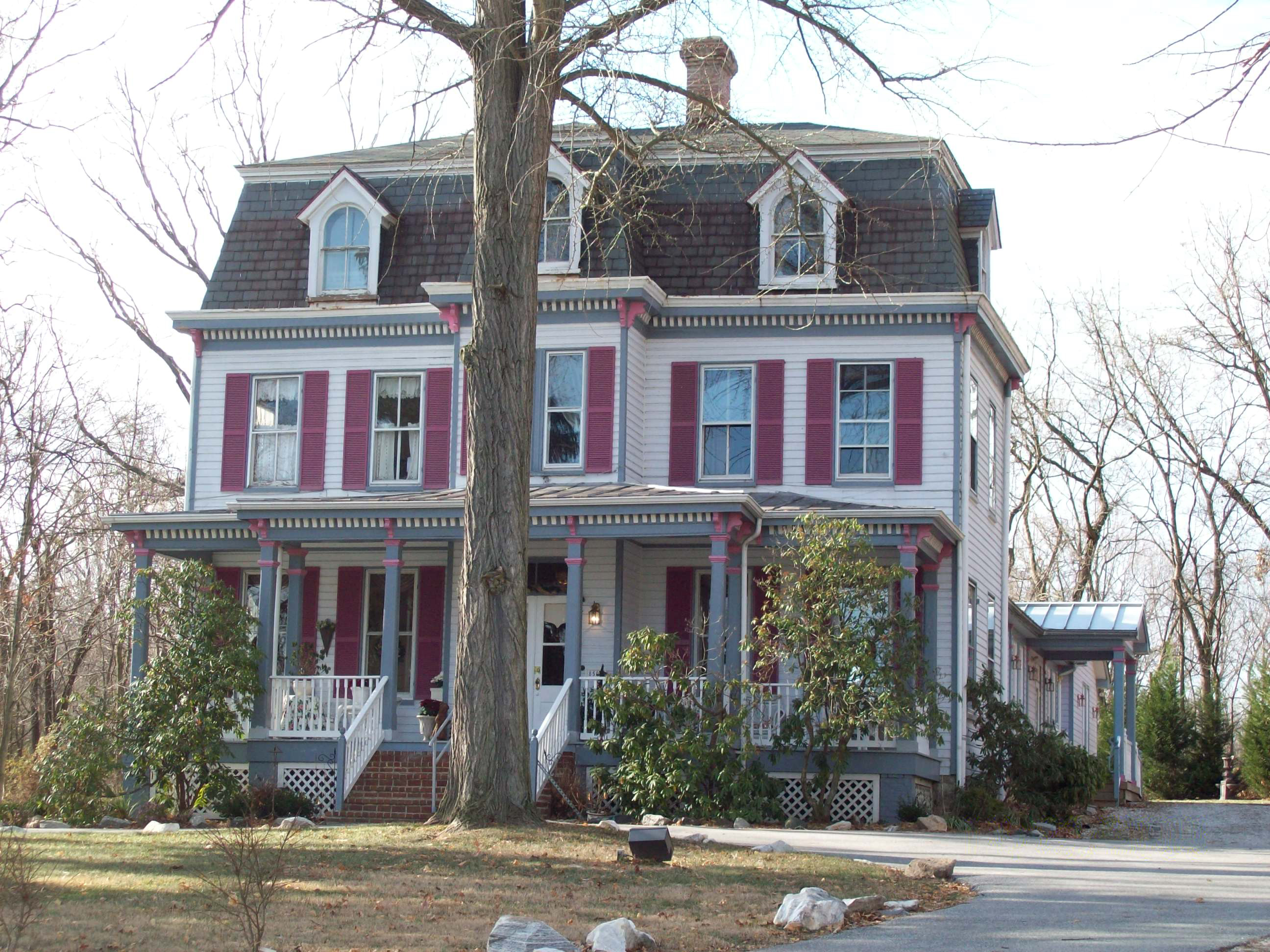
Savage Mill Manor, December 2008
