= Savage-Guilford, Maryland =

- Former Census-designated place
- Location of Savage-Guilford, Maryland
- Coordinates: 39°8′37″N 76°49′29″W
- Country: United States
- State: Maryland
- County: Howard

Area
  - Total: 5.0 sq mi (12.9 km^{2})
  - Land: 4.9 sq mi (12.8 km^{2})
  - Water: 0.039 sq mi (0.1 km^{2})

Population (2000)
  - Total: 12,918
  - Density: 2,617/sq mi (1,010.3/km^{2})
- Time zone: UTC−5 (Eastern (EST))
  - Summer (DST): UTC−4 (EDT)
- ZIP codes: 20723, 20724, 20794, 21046
- FIPS code: 24-70487

Savage-Guilford was a census-designated place (CDP) in Howard County, Maryland, United States, for the 2000 U.S. Census, at which time its population was 12,918. It consisted of the unincorporated community communities of Savage and Guilford. At the 2010 U.S. Census, the area was re-delineated as the Savage CDP.

== History ==
The Savage-Guilford road ran between the Savage Mill to the Commodore Joshua Barney House, to Guilford Road. It was one of the earliest in the region to have electric lighting supplied by Henry Baldwin from the Savage Manufacturing Company. Nearby Savage remained a segregated company town which made the area an unofficial border for African American communities forming closer to Guilford prior to the civil rights era.

== Geography ==
Savage-Guilford is located at 39°8′37″N 76°49′29″W (39.143607, −76.824616).

According to the United States Census Bureau, the CDP had a total area of 5.0 square miles (12.9 km^{2}), of which, 4.9 square miles (12.8 km^{2}) of it is land and 0.04 square miles (0.1 km^{2}) of it (0.80%) is water.

== Demographics ==
As of the census of 2000, there were 12,918 people, 4,811 households, and 3,314 families residing in the CDP. The population density was 2,616.7 inhabitants per square mile (1,010.3/km^{2}). There were 4,943 housing units at an average density of 1,001.3 per square mile (386.6/km^{2}). The racial makeup of the CDP was 65.84% White, 23.34% African American, 0.36% Native American, 5.88% Asian, 0.02% Pacific Islander, 1.39% from other races, and 3.17% from two or more races. Hispanic or Latino of any race were 3.62% of the population.

There were 4,811 households, out of which 41.4% had children under the age of 18 living with them, 51.9% were married couples living together, 13.1% had a female householder with no husband present, and 31.1% were non-families. 22.2% of all households were made up of individuals, and 3.2% had someone living alone who was 65 years of age or older. The average household size was 2.67 and the average family size was 3.18.

In the CDP, the population was spread out, with 29.3% under the age of 18, 6.7% from 18 to 24, 44.1% from 25 to 44, 15.5% from 45 to 64, and 4.4% who were 65 years of age or older. The median age was 32 years. For every 100 females, there were 96.0 males. For every 100 females age 18 and over, there were 92.2 males.

The median income for a household in the CDP was $64,983, and the median income for a family was $70,917. Males had a median income of $45,457 versus $39,777 for females. The per capita income for the CDP was $25,798. About 3.7% of families and 4.9% of the population were below the poverty line, including 5.8% of those under age 18 and 13.3% of those age 65 or over.

== See also ==
- Guilford, Maryland
- Commodore Joshua Barney House
