= Savage Mill =

- U.S. National Register of Historic Places
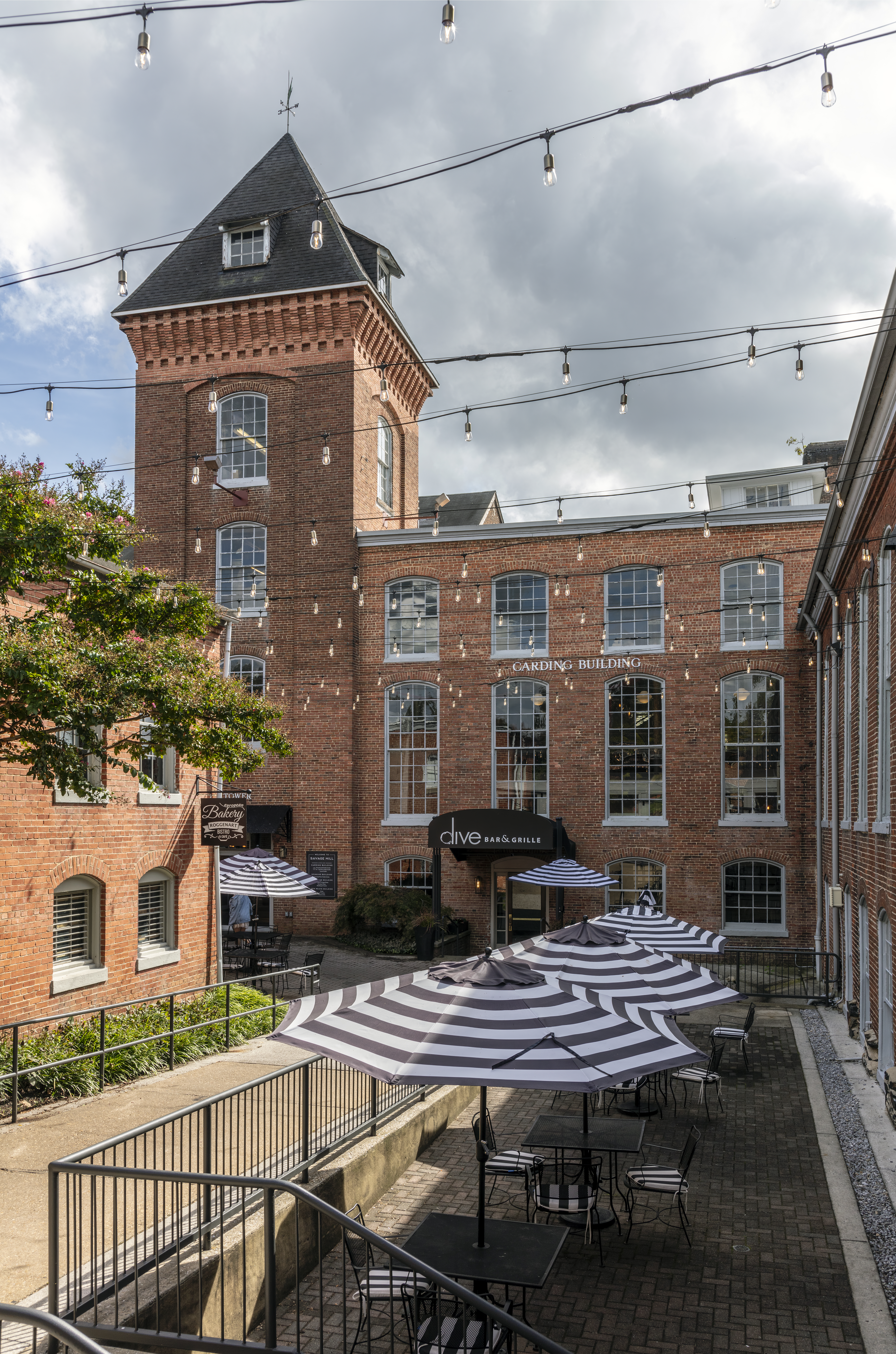
- Savage Mill courtyard in 2023

- Location within Maryland Location within the United States
- Location: SW corner of Foundry Rd. and Washington St., Savage, Maryland
- Coordinates: 39°8′7″N 76°49′37″W
- Area: 11 acres (4.5 ha)
- Built: 1816
- NRHP reference No.: 74002251
- Added to NRHP: April 18, 1974

The Savage Mill is a historic cotton mill complex in Savage, Maryland, which has been turned into a complex of shops and restaurants. It was placed on the National Register of Historic Places in 1974. It is located in the Savage Mill Historic District. Buildings in the complex date from 1822 to 1916.

== Early history ==
The mill property is part of a land grant named Ridgeley's Forest, surveyed on June 3, 1685, by Colonel Henry Ridgley, a future justice of the peace for Anne Arundel who arrived in the colonies in 1659. The property was occupied by Alexander Warfield's (1677–1745) son who transferred it to his cousin, Alexander Warfield (of John) (1704–1740). In 1750, Alexander constructed an early mill along the river at the falls and passed it along to his sons Brice Warfield and John Worthington. The mill was not run profitably and was sold to Francis Simpson (1721–1804) along with portions of "Warfields Range" along the Little Patuxent in 1760. Simpson acquired several local plantation properties and was noted in the 1790 and 1800 Anne Arundel County Census having 16–17 enslaved people working for him by 1800.

== Cotton mill ==
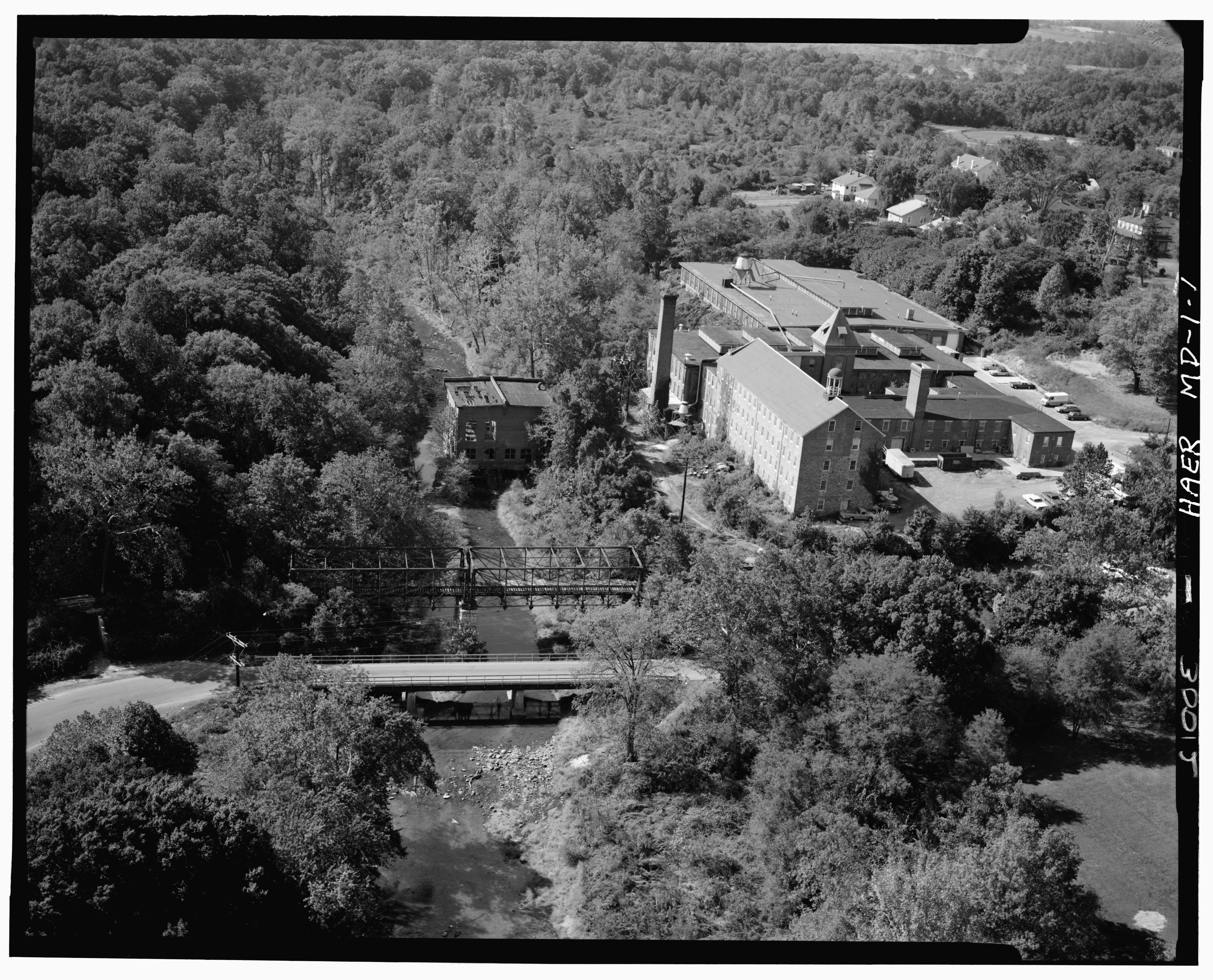
Savage Mill and Bollman Bridge in the 1970s

Commodore Joshua Barney had a colorful career as a sailor, merchant and privateer ranging from Philadelphia harbor to Jamaica. He acquired the land we know as Savage when it was still part of Anne Arundel county, referencing it in letters as being at "Elkridge" (The name the nearest port at Elkridge Landing). In 1809, Nathaniel F. Williams (1782–1864) married Caroline Barney, daughter of Joshua Barney, who lived at the Commodore Joshua Barney House built in 1760. The mill was started next to the Barney house in 1810 by brothers Nathanael F. Williams, Amos Adams Williams (1776-), Cumberland Dugan Williams (1781-) and George Williams (1778-). Shortly after starting the enterprise, Joshua Barney and Nathaniel Williams participated in the War of 1812, with Nathanial becoming wounded at the Battle of North Point and Barney wounded at the Battle of Bladensburg. The mill and town were named after the Kingston, Jamaican born John Savage II (1790–1831), of the Philadelphia shipping firm Savage & Dugan. Savage was also known for his association with the old United States Bank. A close family association to the founders of Savage and Dugan is evident in Cumberland Dugan Williams naming. Savage financed the Williams brothers the money to start the business and bought the mill outright in 1823 for $6,667.67. James E. P. Boulden

In December 1821 the mill was chartered as the Savage Manufacturing Company. The main product was cotton duck, used for sailcloth and a wide variety of other uses. On March 26, 1824, $12,000 was loaned from the Bank of Baltimore to expand operations. The mill had established itself early on as a premier site of manufacturing product and machinery for the east coast as noted in an 1825 letter from Daniel Lammott to E.I. Du Pont stating "it would be the best and largest establishment in the country." Most workers were women who were on lockdown throughout their shifts posing a risk of certain peril if a fire broke out. A messenger would deliver notes if communications were needed or they could speak through a small window in the locked door.

By 1829 Amos Williams combined "Whites Contrivance", "Brothers In Partnership", and "Williams Discovery" to expand the mill town to 980 acres. The parcel was named "Conclusion", which was joined with Charles Alexander Warfield's "Wincopin Neck" upstream to form a dam on the Little Patuxent River, which runs adjacent to the mill property. Money was loaned to by additional land from Mrs. Dorsey. Amos managed the company at the time from an office in Baltimore on Calvert street just west of Lexington. In 1831, Mr. Hack, a machinist at the mill developed a machine for reeling and twisting silk that was taken to Washington for a patent The same year, a case of Small Pox struck at least 30 persons. In October 1832, Amos Williams moved to the mill site with a salary of $300 a year to entertain business clients. By this time the cotton mill site had a grist mill, saw mill, machine shop, foundry, blacksmith shop, wheelwright shop, brick-making facility, farm, rental houses and company store. That year, Joseph Bancroft used parts manufactured by the mill to establish a mill in Rockdale, Pennsylvania. In 1835 the post office moved from Waterloo to Savage Factory. In 1837, a furnace purchased for $8,000 operated on the mill property but managed separately by Amos A Williams, Cumberland Dugan Williams and Thomas Landsdale. After a drought in June 1836, the company decided to operate a lower cost wagon path to connect to the new B&O railroad and a portion of the Thomas Snowden's property on the Hammond Branch was added to divert water. The same year the company provided slabbing engines, turning lathes and gear cutters to the Harpers Ferry Armory, location John Brown's raid on Harpers Ferry. From 1836 to 1843, The Savage Manufacturing Company started its own currency with scrip amounts of 25 cents, 50 cents and one dollar. On June 6, 1839, Amos A. Williams resigned due to a sickness that would last until 1844, leaving control of the company to his brother Cumberland Dugan Williams. During his sickness, the company developed "Baldwin's Cotton, Hay and Tobacco press which was manufactured onsite for sales in the Southern states and the Rechm planing machine. Additional land was purchased by the mill on November 28, 1843, for $4,755 that included property from Mr. Lambert and William Worthington for firewood and ore for the furnace operations. In 1846, The Savage Manufacturing Company sold existing or manufactured looms and steam power engines for the Powhatan Company in Baltimore. In 1848, Amos A. Williams entered ligation against the Savage Manufacturing Company and his brothers George, Cumberland and Nathanial claiming they tried to force him into poverty from indebtedness during his illness.

The mill had a good source of water power, but the river was unnavigable for delivery. Horses and mules were used to deliver the product to market. In March 1835 the Savage Railroad Company was incorporated by Amos and Cumberland Williams and other investors with $15,000 in stock to bring a rail spur to the mill off the Patuxent branch of the Baltimore and Ohio Railroad, and in the 1870s a Bollman Truss Bridge was moved to the spur. This bridge survives and is the only one of its kind left.

In 1859, William Henry Baldwin Jr. (1821– ) of the Talbot Jones Co. (Woodward Baldwin & Co.) took over operations as the Savage Manufacturing Company, purchasing the land and factory for $42,000. From 1861 to 1862 the mill closed due to lack of raw cotton from the Southern states during the civil war. The mill was managed by William Henry's son Carroll Baldwin from 1905 to 1918 merging with the New York-based Baldwin, Leslie and Company. In 1918 the company was renamed Leslie Evans and Company after Baldwin's death. Harry M. Leslie (1880–1945) managed the Savage Mill, the Hart Cotton Mill of Tarboro, North Carolina, Postex Cotton Mills of Post, Texas and Clinchfield Manufacturing Company of Marion, North Carolina.

Workers from the factory worked 6 days a week in 10 hours shifts and were issued company scrip in various denominations that were usable in the only store in the village on Commerce street that was also owned by the company.

In 1880, steam engines were installed. In 1911 The Savage Manufacturing Company Patented a process for drying paper using its cotton duck product. Notable factory workers at the mill included Horatio Gambrill of Druid Mills, David Carroll of Mt. Vernon Mills, and Baltimore mayor Samuel Hinks.

In February 1928, in the lull in operations between World War I and World War II, the B&O discontinued its Patuxent rail spur service upstream to the quarries at Guilford, Maryland, leaving Savage at the end of the line. In 1939, Savage still operated as a "company town" under less progressive standards, with the Savage Manufacturing Company stipulating that land it considered donating to the county for a school never be sold for use by an African American, another business, or sales of wine or spirits.

Throughout World War II the mill produced heavy duck for canvas, hoses, refining and sails and community power from the waterwheel. The demand for canvas dropped considerably after the war, and the mill was scheduled to be shut down January 1, 1948. At time the 400 acre complex employed 372, consisted of twelve industrial buildings and 98 houses owned and rented by the mill. Although there were early records of using African American apprentices prior to the civil war, the mill remained segregated through most of its industrial history.

The oldest remaining mill structure is the stone carding and spinning building, probably built between 1816 and 1823. The mill was expanded by the Baldwins before 1881, and that expansion included the brick tower with Romanesque overtones. Other buildings include the weaving shed, preparation area, paymaster's office, and several early-20th century warehouses and power plants.

== Christmas village ==
After the mill closed, it was bought by Harry H. Heim for $450,000 who converted it into Santa Novelties, manufacturing Christmas ornaments, featuring a Christmas Display Village named "Santa Heim" (Santa's Home) which opened in December 1948. It featured live reindeer, a one ring circus, and a miniature train that carried guests to the mill from a parking lot on U.S. Route 1. A turreted castle was built at the corner of Route One and Gorman Road. The Carol Baldwin Hall was used for sales of Christmas products. Several picket fenced homes along the tree-lined Baltimore Avenue were demolished for the operation.

Production included 65 million Christmas tree globes produced onsite with 400 workers.

This business was relatively short lived. Efforts to rename the town to Santa Heim did not go through, nor did the plan for a hotel and artificial lake with a waterfall. In 1949, Harry Heim was indicted by the state on tax evasion charges and fined $100 ($1,353 in 2025), and his business operations shut down shortly thereafter. In 1950 the mill was purchased by Albert Winer and his brothers Samuel, Hyman, and Ephraim who used for warehousing by the National Store Fixture Company.

== Renovation ==
In 1975, Winer unsuccessfully attempted to rezone the mill property from industrial to business while starting a restoration attempt. The initial restoration was completed by September 1981. In 1985 Albert Winer's son Jay Winer founded Savage Limited Partnership and reopened the mill as a collection of restaurants, specialty shops, and antique dealers. In 1991, The State of Maryland and Howard County loaned Savage Mill Limited Partnership $900,000. The partnership declared bankruptcy in 1994. This has been expanded over the years to encompass five of the larger buildings in the complex. In 2010, tourism numbers for the mill surpassed one million. A series of zip lines and rope obstacles were built along the mill race creating Terrapin Adventures. In 2015 the mill drew regional publicity after the owner of Rams Head was convicted for videotaping women in a bathroom.

== Subdivision ==
In 2013, the Howard County Department of Planning and Zoning issued a comprehensive zoning update that included zoning changes to allow density increases for the "Savage remainder" property. The five acre plateau of woodland with steep drops to the Patuxent on two sides that was not purchased by the county as part of Savage Park. Buzzutto homes proposed a housing project called the Settlement at Savage Mill which included significant grading changes and donations of land by the parks department to the developer to maximize density, which was opposed by a referendum attempt. The 7000-person referendum attempt was suppressed by the landowners' attorney, William Erskine, who sits on the economic development agency as well as the same law firm as County Executive Ken Ulman's father.

== See also ==
- Savage Mill History
- List of Howard County properties in the Maryland Historical Trust
- Savage Mill Historic District
- Savage Mill Trail
- Bollman Truss Railroad Bridge
- John Savage – The Namesake of Savage, Maryland

== Gallery ==
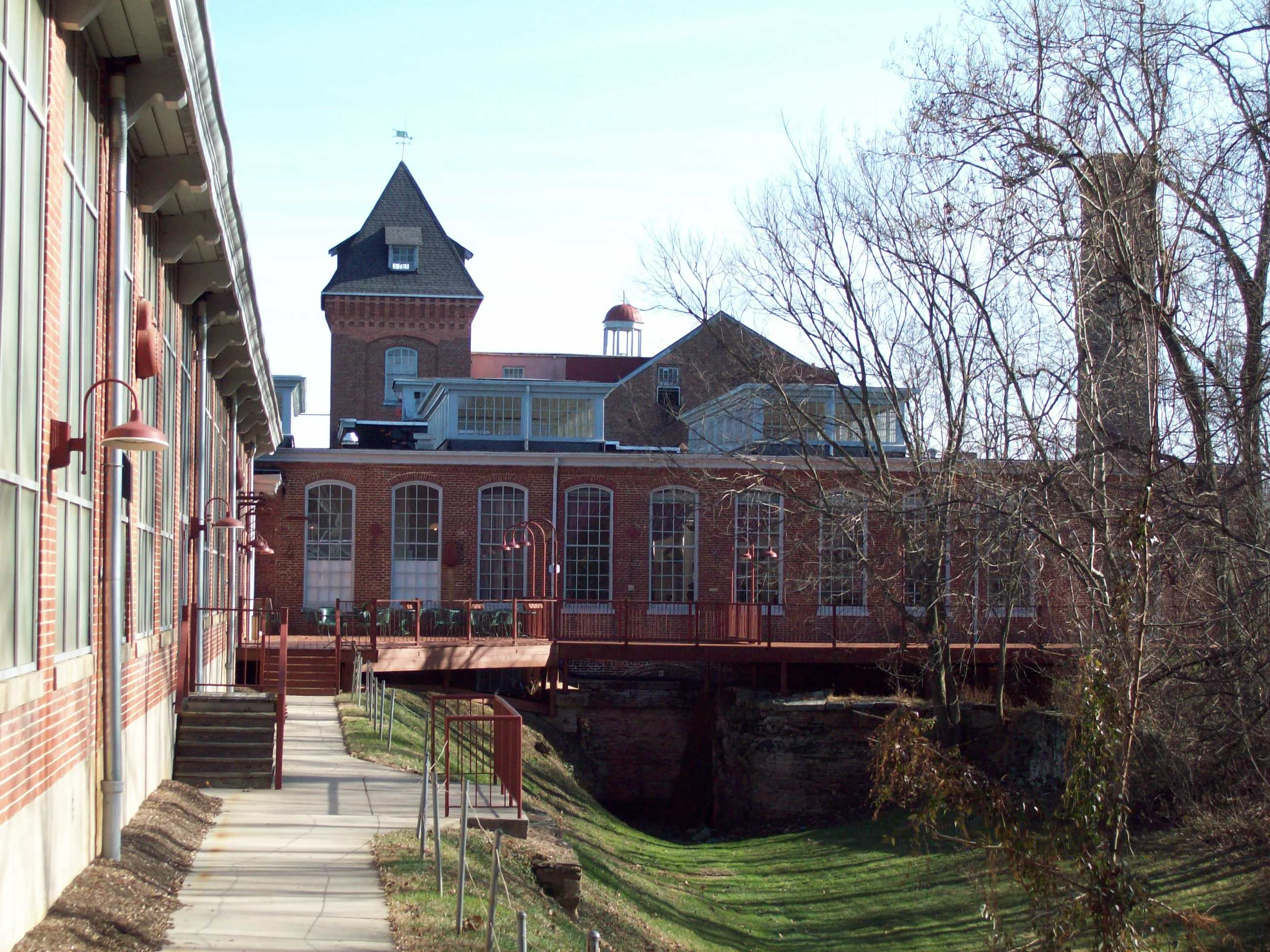
Savage Mill Rear View, December 2008

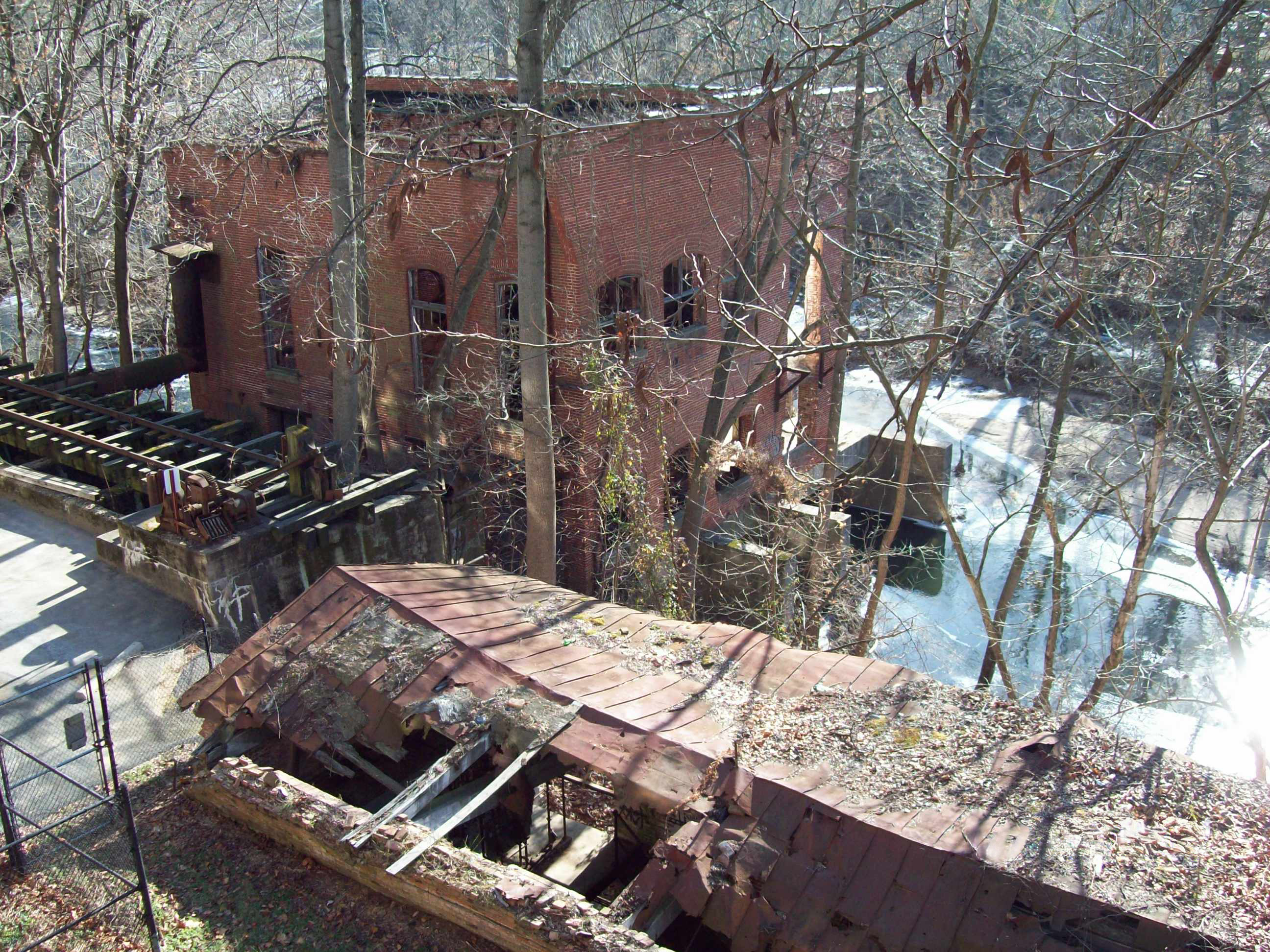
Savage Mill Buildings, December 2008
