= Savage & Dugan =

- Industry: Shipping and insurance
- Headquarters: York Street, Philadelphia
- Key people: John Savage (1765-1834), Joseph Dugan (1766-1845)

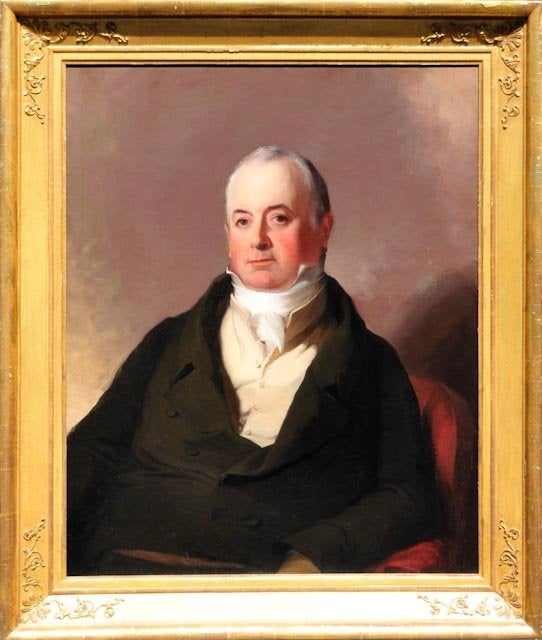
John Savage

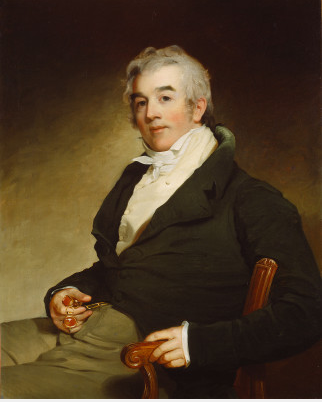
Joseph Dugan

Portraits by Thomas Sully

Savage & Dugan was a Philadelphia shipping and underwriting company.

Savage and Dugan operated ships ranging from Philadelphia to Puerto Rico, with a wide range of cargo needed in the early 19th century. As businessmen, they invested in the early unsuccessful Philadelphia-based National Bank.

The firm was operated by John Savage and Joseph Dugan. John Savage was born in Kingston Jamaica and was the son of William Savage and Jane Cooper (Demetris), marrying Jane Allen White. Savage started business in Philadelphia as a grocer in 1791 with a shop on 324 South Front Street. In 1794 he had an established underwriter and merchant business. The practice of the time was for multiple companies to insure a fraction of a ship's value. Savage & Dugan started with the ship Nancy with nine other underwriters in 1794. By 1797 the company was creating policies on entire ships with fees as high as 7.5% percent of the value of the ship charged per trip from Philadelphia to Les Cayes, noting the hazard of sea travel at the time. By 1803 Savage had founded the Philadelphia Insurance Company. Philadelphia sailor Commodore Joshua Barney and his son-in law Nathaniel F. Williams named the town of Savage, Maryland after John Savage. Barney's son-in law Cumberland Dugan Barney was named after Joeseph Dugan. Joseph Dugan became a director in the Bank of the United States in 1816, which John Savage regularly purchased stock from. He retired to 10 Portico Square in Philadelphia.

John Savage's son John Savage Jr. retired to a house on the Northwest corner of Eleventh and Spruce by 1846, with a net worth of $200,000. His niece married into the Pleasonton family. Augustus J. Pleasonton succeeded the partners, followed by Frank S. Pleasonton

On 25 March 1799, the brig Liveley sailed out of Philadelphia en route to Puerto Rico captained by Micheal Alcorn. It was captured by the French privateer L'Alliance captained by Dupuy on 15 April 1799. The ship was condemned in Basseterre, Guadeloupe with a total loss of cargo which consisted of flour, copper, stills, lard, soap, candles, onions, cheese, oil, razor strops, and bags. A court case claimed the brig had a commission from the President to capture French armed vessels. The ship was insured for $7,000 and John Cadwalader Jr, and Frank S. Pleasonton, heirs to Savage and Dugan sued France for the amount in 1909, over 100 years after the incident.

The same year, the 209 ton cargo ship Stranger owned by Cornelius Coolidge was captured by the French with Savage & Dugan cargo lost.

In 1803 they had offices at 91 South Third Street and by 1806 they were located at Compting House at York Court.

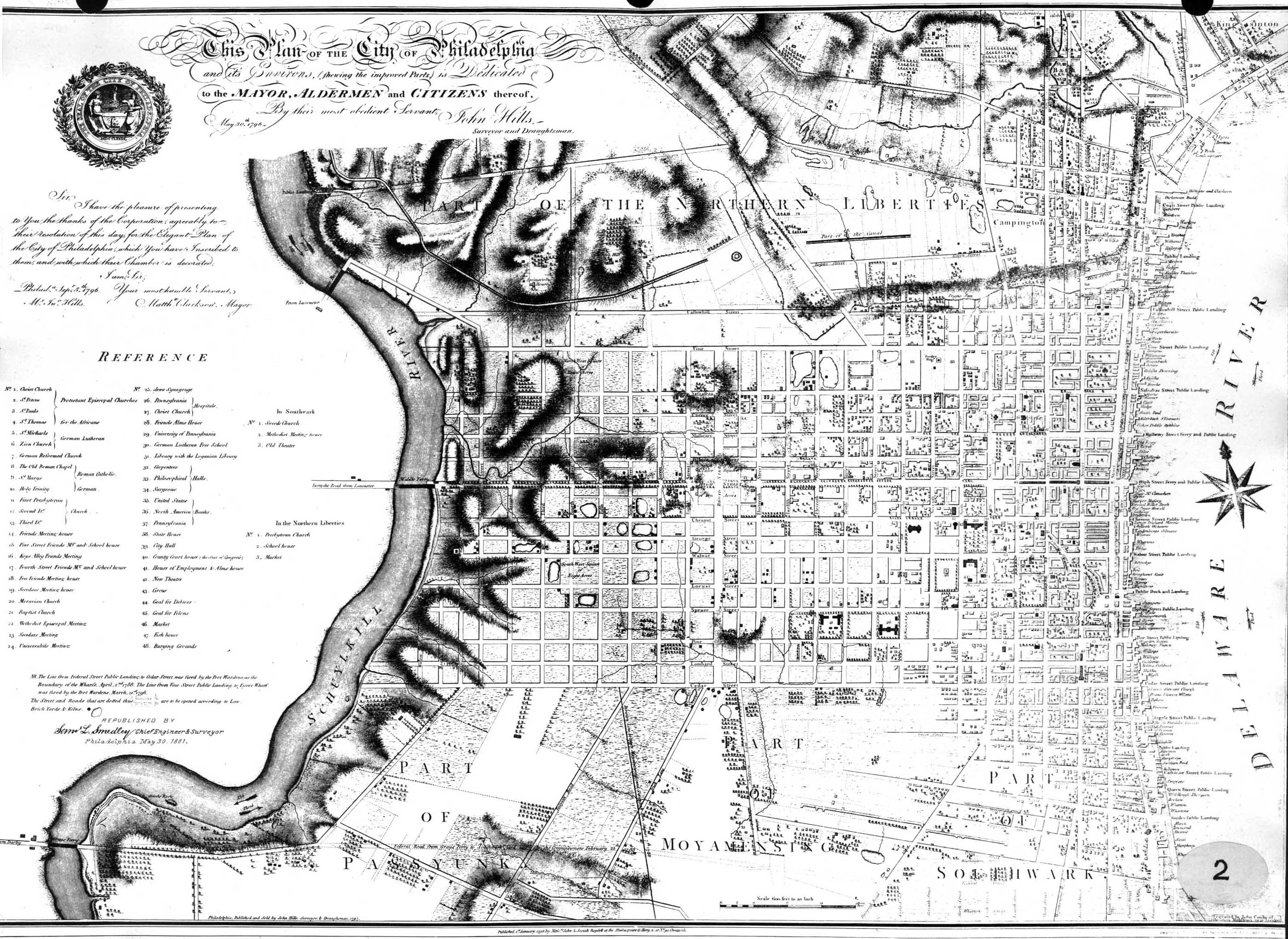
Philadelphia in 1796.

== Ships ==
Summary of Ships owned by Savage & Dugan
Ship name	Type	Year built	Fate
Hope	157 ton Cargo - Captain Frencis Edmonston		In service with coffee cargo 1799
Liveley	114 ton six gun Brig value $4,000 - Captain Alcorn	1789 - Philadelphia	Captured 15 April 1799 by the Captain Dupuy's L'Alliance
Sally and Betsey	Brig - Captain Worth		Captured on 8 January 1800, Condemned at Guadeloupe
Amelia	Cargo Brig fitted with 14 fake wooden guns - Captain James R. Callender		Captured in 1800 near Strait of Gilbralter by L'Adolphe and La Belle Poule
Hannah	218 ton Cargo Brig - Captain James Yeardsley	Portsmouth, Virginia	In service 1804 with a cargo of Cashew Nuts from Kingston, Jamaica
Susanna	Brig - Captain Sammeul Casson		In service 1811
