= Bollman Truss Railroad Bridge =

Historic truss bridge in Savage, Maryland, US

Bollman Suspension and Truss Bridge
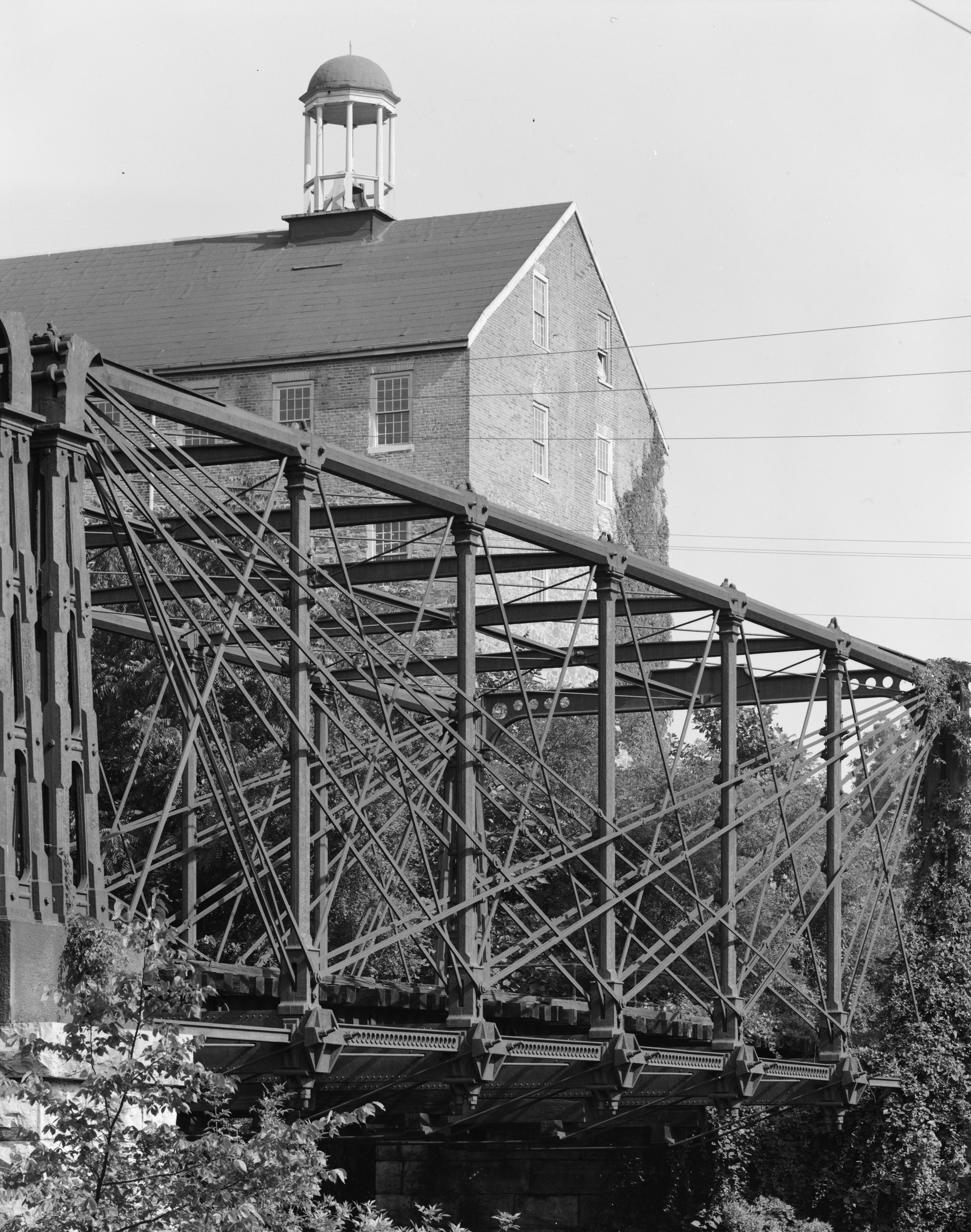
- Bollman Bridge with Savage Mill tower in background, 1970
- Coordinates: 39°8′5″N 76°49′31″W
- Carries: Savage Mill Trail
- Crosses: Little Patuxent River
- Locale: Savage, Maryland

Characteristics
- Design: Bollman Suspension Truss
- Material: Cast and wrought Iron
- Total length: 160 feet (48.8 m)
- Longest span: 2 × 80 feet (24.4 m)
- No. of spans: 2
- Piers in water: 1
- Load limit: 36 tons (72000 kips)

History
- Designer: Wendel Bollman
- Construction end: 1869

Statistics
- Bollman Suspension and Trussed Bridge
- U.S. National Register of Historic Places
- U.S. National Historic Landmark
- Area: 4 acres (1.6 ha)
- NRHP reference No.: 72000582

Significant dates
- Added to NRHP: October 18, 1972
- Designated NHL: February 16, 2000

Location
- Interactive map of Bollman Suspension and Truss Bridge

The Bollman Truss Railroad Bridge across the Little Patuxent River at Savage, Maryland, is one of the oldest standing iron railroad bridges in the United States and the sole surviving example of a revolutionary design in the history of American bridge engineering. The 160-foot (48.8 m) double-span was built in 1852 at an unknown location on the main line of the Baltimore and Ohio Railroad. It was moved 35 years later to its present location, where it replaced the very first Bollman bridge. Today, it carries the Savage Mill Trail.

The Bollman design, a through truss bridge, was the first successful all-metal bridge design to be adopted and consistently used on a railroad. The type was named for its inventor, Wendel Bollman, a self-educated Baltimore civil engineer. Bollman formed two companies in Baltimore, the W. Bollman and Company and the Patapsco Bridge Company, to market the bridge in North and South America.

In 1966, the American Society of Civil Engineers designated the bridge as the first National Historic Civil Engineering Landmark. The bridge was listed on the National Register of Historic Places on December 18, 1972, and was designated a National Historic Landmark on February 16, 2000.

== History ==
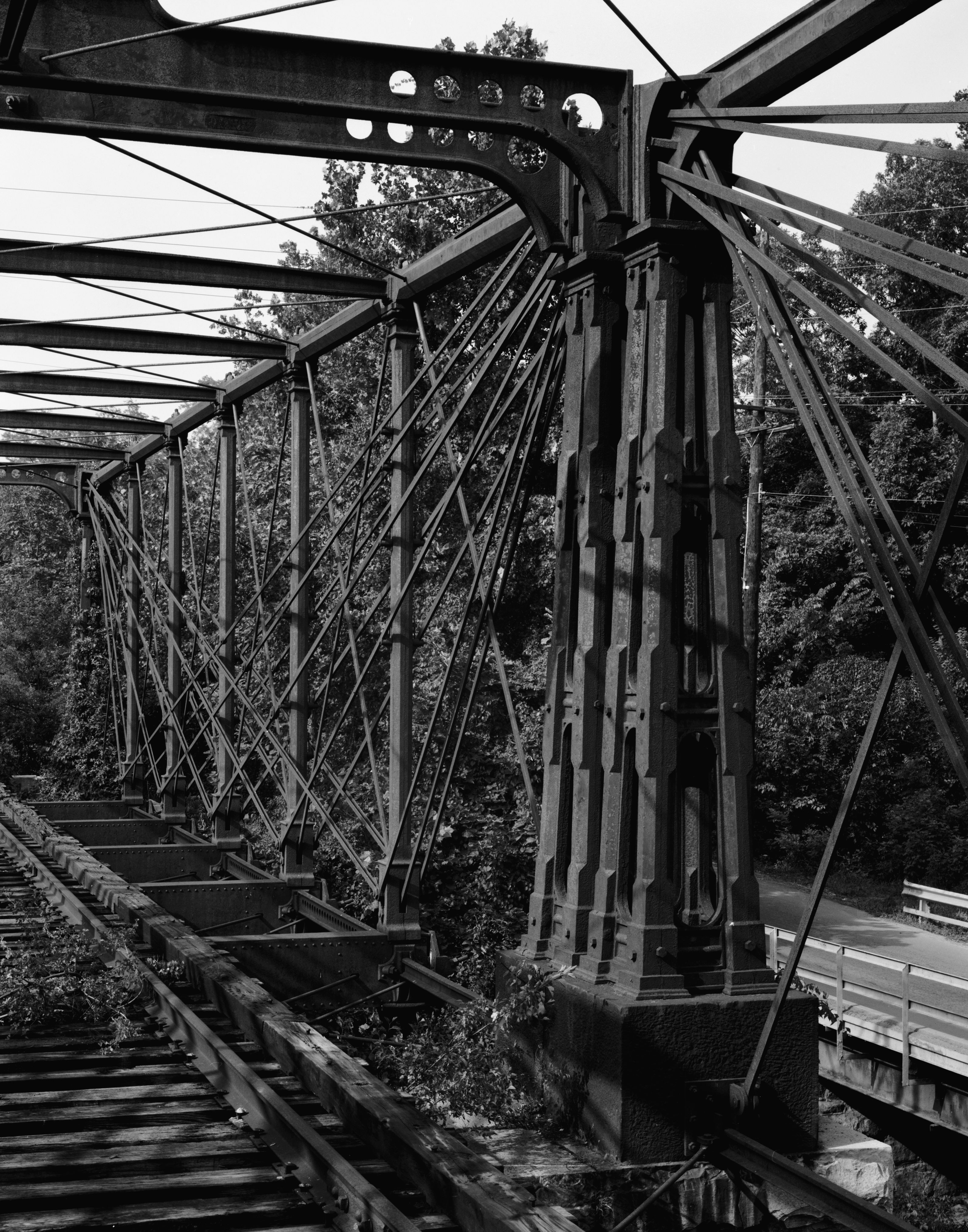
The bridge's paired end posts at mid-span showing connection of diagonal tension members with anchor casting

The bridge was built for an unknown location on the main line of the Baltimore and Ohio Railroad in 1852 and was moved to its present location, spanning the Little Patuxent River on the spur to the Savage Mill, in 1887. This spur line dates to around 1840 and originally crossed the river on a stone arch bridge; however, due to alterations to the mill in the 1880s and topographical restrictions, a replacement bridge was needed. The bridge remained in service until the mill closed in 1947; switching crews used additional cars in order to avoid crossing the bridge with locomotives, and thus there was never a need for a more substantial structure. A smaller, narrower example was installed next to the railroad bridge for road traffic, which was removed sometime after World War I.

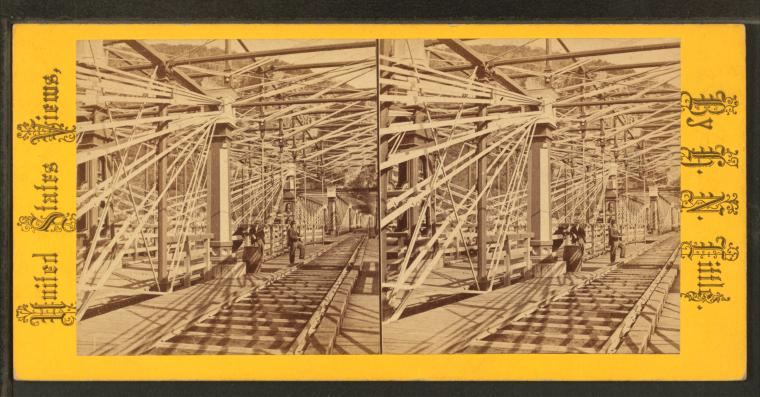
Bollman Truss Bridge At Harpers Ferry

It was the first successful all-metal bridge design to be adopted and consistently used on a railroad. The design employs wrought iron tension members and cast iron compression members. It was an improvement over wooden structures, as the independent structural units lessened the possibility of structural failure. After receiving a patent on January 6, 1852, the company built about a hundred of these bridges through 1873. Their durability and ease of assembly greatly facilitated expansion of American railroads in this period. Bollman's Wills Creek Bridge has also survived, but it employs a different type of truss system.

=== Restoration ===
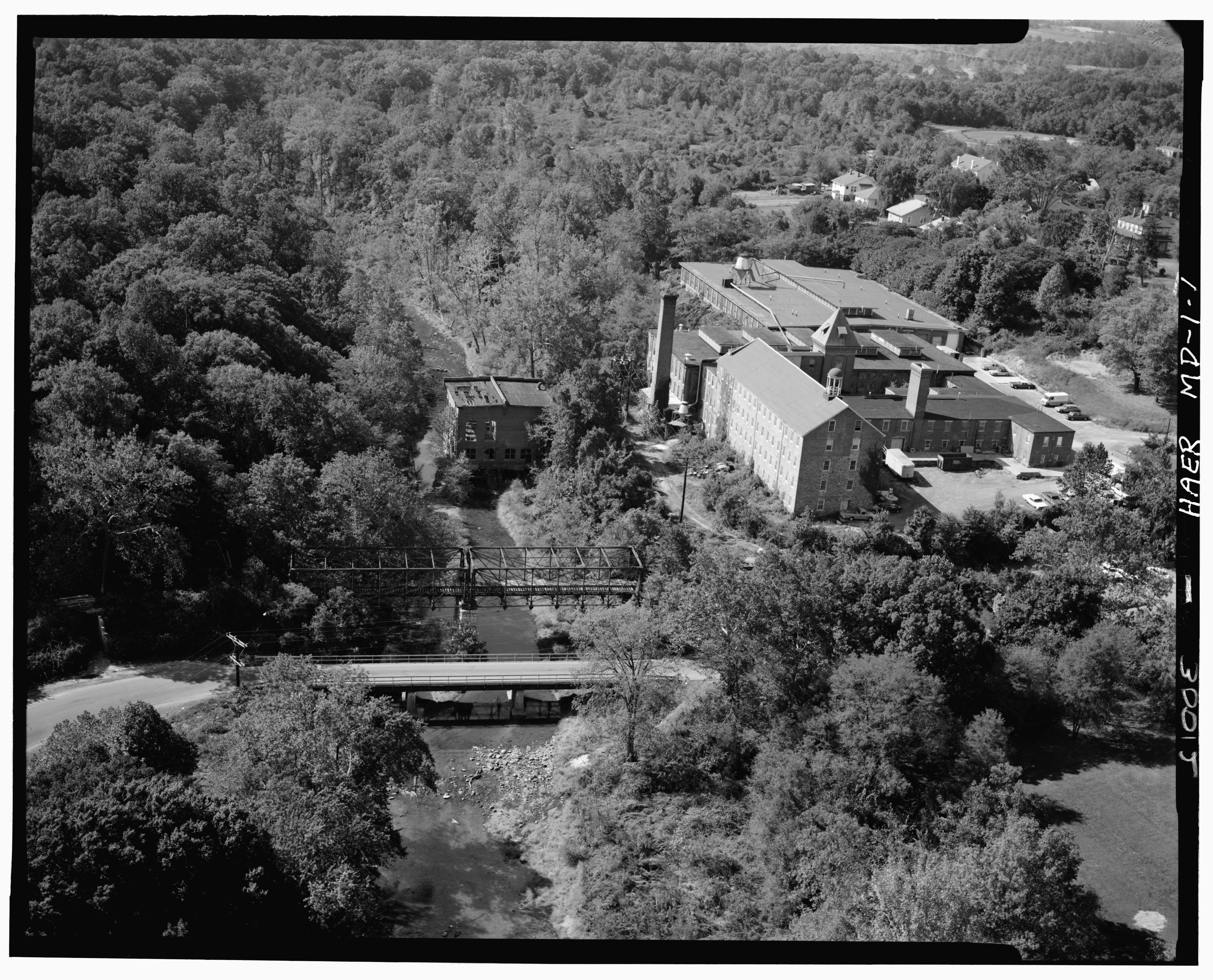
Savage Mill and Bollman Bridge in the 1970s

In 1966, the American Society of Civil Engineers introduced its National Historic Civil Engineering Landmark program, designating the bridge as the first landmark. The bridge was listed on the National Register of Historic Places on December 18, 1972, and was designated a National Historic Landmark on February 16, 2000.

The bridge was surveyed for restoration in 1978 by Modjeski and Masters, which noted deterioration of the floor trusses. A $214,200 restoration contract was let to Dewey-Jordan of Frederick, Maryland, in September 1982. The bridge was restored by Wallace, Montgomery & Associates, LLP, for the Howard County Department of Recreation and Parks in 1983. In 2000, it received additional preservation work and was rededicated on September 16. Today it receives regular maintenance as part of Savage Park. Nearby Bollman Bridge Elementary School takes its name from the historic bridge.

== Description ==
The Bollman Bridge is a two-span through-truss, resting on granite abutments at each end and a granite pier in the middle of the river. The truss structure is a mixture of wrought and cast iron. The truss configuration is the design patented by Bollman as the "Bollman suspension truss" in 1852. Each span is 79.5 feet (24.2 m) long, 25.5 feet (7.8 m) wide and about 21 feet (6.4 m) tall. The Bollman truss suspends the deck from a network of tension members, while the top chord resists compressive forces. The system is therefore referred to as a suspension truss. Bollman published a booklet describing the Harpers Ferry bridge and the system in general as a “suspension and trussed bridge,” which is accurate as the design lacks an active lower chord required of a strict truss bridge. Later descriptions used "suspension truss" for the design.

The truss includes decorative elements, such as Doric styled vertical members. The cast iron end towers, which transfer the weight of the structure to the abutments and pier, are also detailed. A decorative and protective metal enclosure at the top of the towers was lost to vandalism but was replaced during the restoration work. Metal strips at each portal read "W. BOLLMAN, PATENTEE", "BALTIMORE, MD.", "BUILT BY B&O R.R. CO.", "1869" AND "RENEWED 1866". Replicas of the original strips were installed during the restoration.

The bridge is brightly painted, using red oxide for the towers and the heavier compression members and an ivory color for the lighter tension members. The bridge was originally painted in a three-color scheme, documented in black-and-white photography, with specific shades unknown.

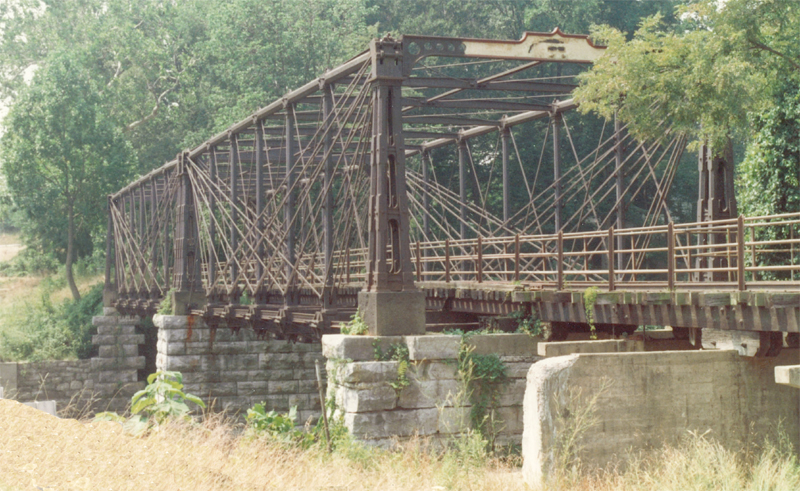
Original bridge in 1982, prior to restoration

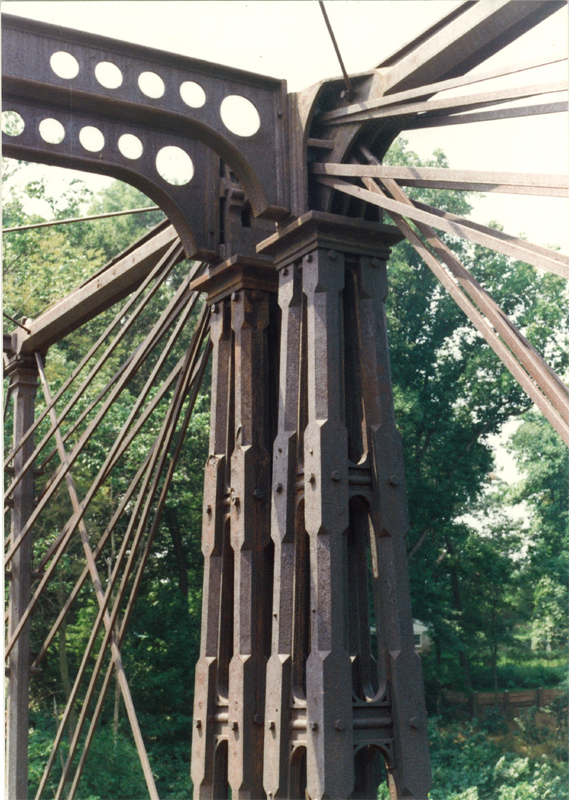
Upper cords in 1982

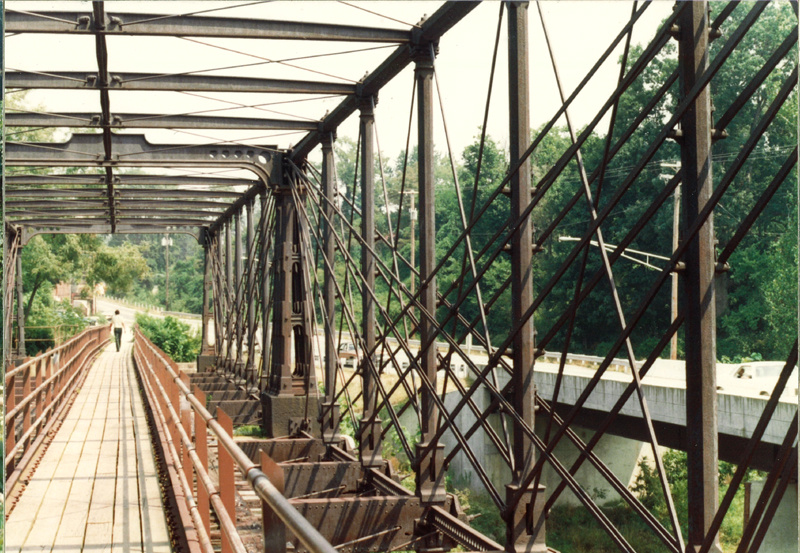
View through the bridge in 1982

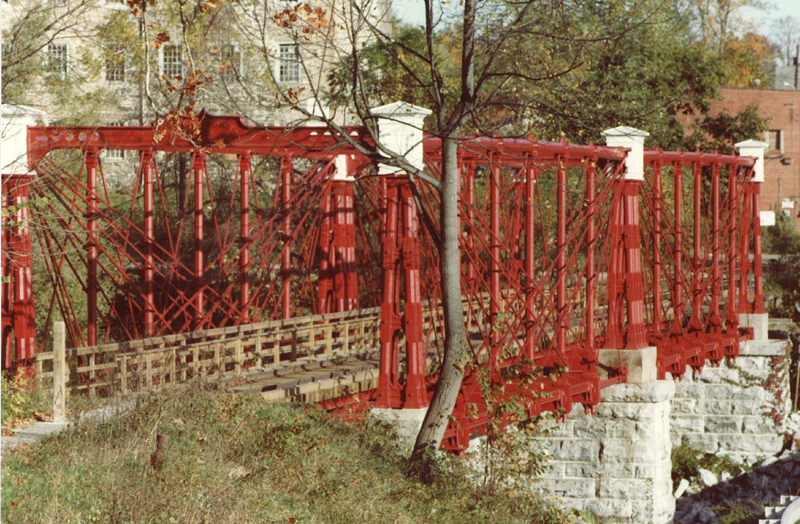
View of the bridge in 1984, following restoration

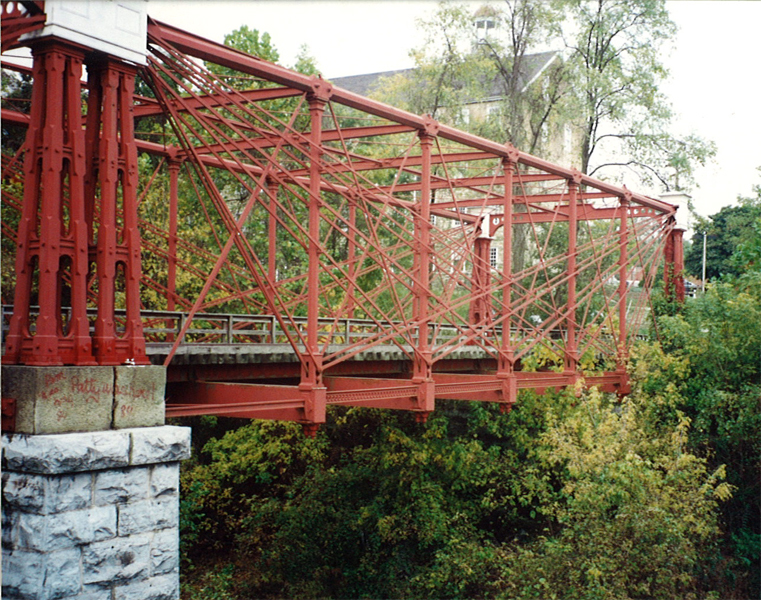
View of the bridge in 1984

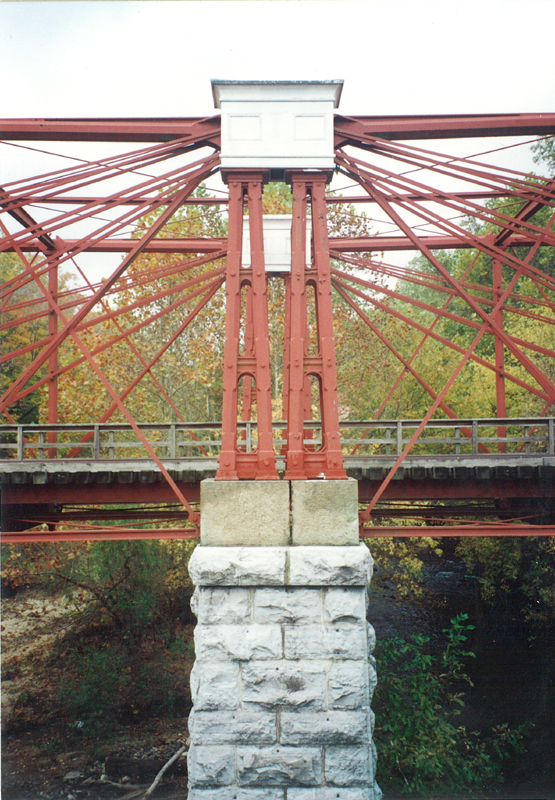
View of the bridge and pier in 1984

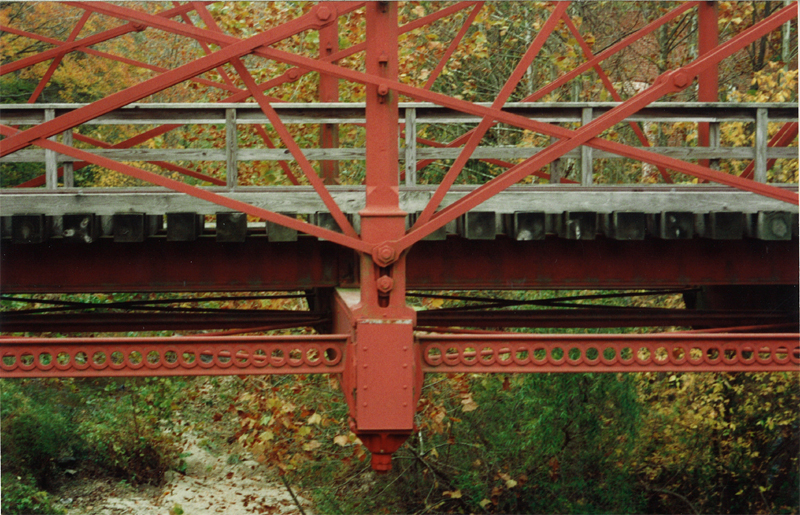
Lower cords in 1984

== See also ==
- Two Famous Bollman Bridges in the Savage Area
- List of bridges documented by the Historic American Engineering Record in Maryland
- Savage Mill History
- List of Historic Civil Engineering Landmarks
- List of bridges on the National Register of Historic Places in Maryland
- List of Howard County properties in the Maryland Historical Trust
- List of National Historic Landmarks in Maryland
- National Register of Historic Places listings in Howard County, Maryland
