= Nathaniel F. Williams =

American businessman and politician (1782–1864)

Nathaniel Williams

Member of the Maryland Senate
- In office 1853

Personal details
- Born: March 14, 1782 Roxbury, Massachusetts, U.S.
- Died: September 10, 1864 (aged 82) Baltimore, Maryland, U.S.
- Spouse(s): Caroline Barney, Maria Pickett Dalrymple
- Relations: Joseph (1764-1793), Susanna (1767-1812), Samuel (1769-1813), Mary (1771-1793), Lemuel (1774-1797), Amos Adams (1776), George (1778-1852), Martha (1780), Cumberland Dugan (1781-1840), Nehimeiah Davis (1786-), Benjamin (-1822)
- Children: Joshua Barney (1819-), Joseph Barney (1830-), Ann B., Victoria B., Samuel, Caroline B., Sarah - Rebecca D., Maria D., Dalrymple
- Parent(s): Joseph Williams, Susanna May
- Education: Harvard University
- Known for: Politician, War of 1812, Founding Savage Mill

Nathaniel Williams (March 14, 1782 – September 10, 1864) was an American businessman and politician.

== Early life ==
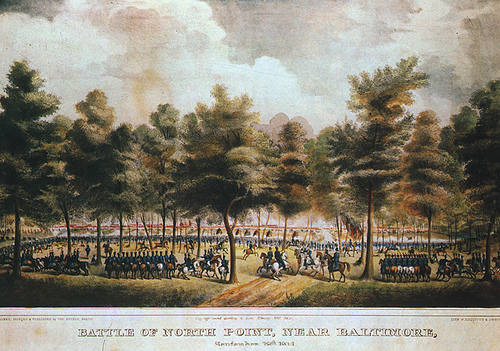
The Battle of North Point

Nathaniel Williams was born March 14, 1782, in Roxbury, Massachusetts. He was the son of Joseph (born 1738) and Susannah (May) Williams. His grandfather, Colonel Joseph Williams (1708–1798), fought in the French and Indian War in 1755. Before 1799, his brother Benjamin moved from Roxbury to 126 Lombard in Baltimore becoming wealthy in the shipping industry. Benjamin's Daughter Susan May Williams, became well known for her relation to Napoleon through her marriage to Jérôme Napoléon Bonaparte.

He graduated from Harvard College in 1801 and served as a lawyer in Boston and Annapolis. He married Caroline Barney, daughter of Anne and Commodore Joshua Barney in 1809. With his brothers, Amos, George and Cumberland, he founded the Savage Mill on land next to the Commodore Joshua Barney House in Maryland. He then served as an attorney for the Maryland Senate, Western Shore from 1811 to 1816.

During the War of 1812, he served as a private in the Baltimore Fencibles, a volunteer artillery company. He became wounded at the Battle of North Point in 1814; but was later declared dead after being shot on the battlefield in his hip. He was treated by Dr. Owens of the 5th regiment for two days and then sent home on a wagon cart. Nathaniel's brothers Cumberland Dugan and George Williams were also on the roster of the Fencibles.

When Luther Martin became ill, Williams became Acting Attorney General of Maryland, serving from 1820 to 1822. Williams married Maria Pickett Dalrymple in 1829. He was the District of Maryland United States Attorney from 1824 to 1841 and served on the Executive Council from 1835 to 1837. He represented Baltimore City in the Maryland Senate in 1853. He was also a trustee, University of Maryland in 1826. Nathaniel Williams died on September 10, 1864.

== Confusion with Nathaniel Felton Williams ==
Nathaniel F(elton) Williams was a close cousin to Nathaniel Williams and his brothers as well as a founder of the First Independent Church of Baltimore and resident of Baltimore. According to the March 2016 publication of the First Unitarian Church of Baltimore entitled "The Beacon", Nathaniel F.(elton) Williams (1779–1865) was married to Elizabeth Redman Beck (1789–1826) with whom he had five children: William Paul (1809–1809); Emily Louise (1811– ); Henry Paul (1813–1844); Martha Elizabeth (1815– ); and Charles Thompson (1816– ). During the War of 1812, he served as a lieutenant in Captain Joseph H. Nicholson’s company of Baltimore artillery. He was a well-regarded commission merchant (someone who buys or sells products for a percentage of the sales price) in Baltimore. With Levi Hollingsworth, he formed the Gunpowder Copper Works (on Harford Road in Glen Arm), which supplied copper sheeting to the Navy and for the U.S. Capitol dome. From 1835–1837, he was a member of the five-man Governor’s Council, in 1837 serving as acting governor.25 From 1841–1844, he was collector of the Port of Baltimore. The collector of the port was a federal officer who was in charge of the collection of import duties on foreign goods that entered the United States by ship.
