= Commodore Joshua Barney House =

Historic house in Maryland, United States

- U.S. National Register of Historic Places
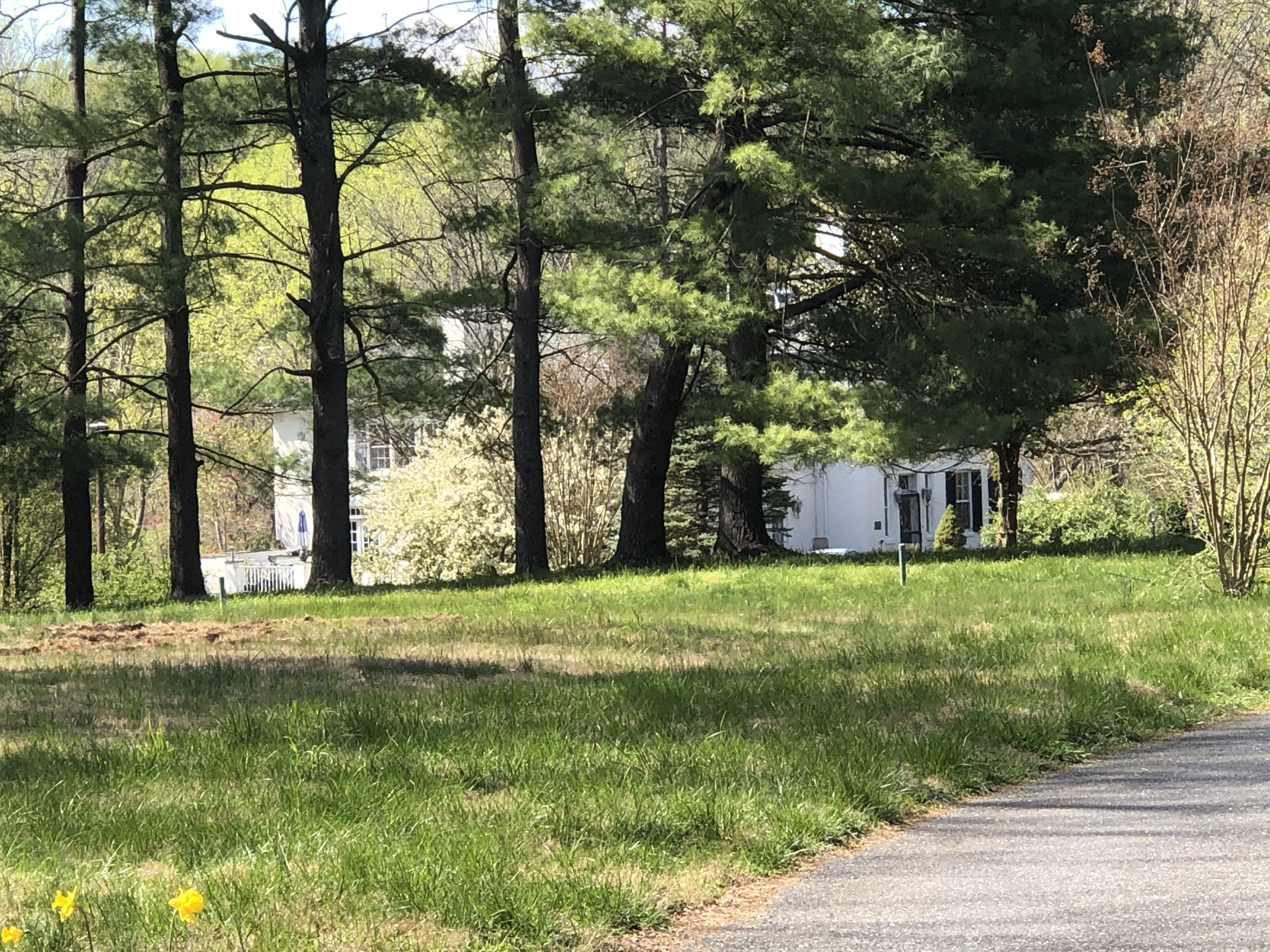

- Location within Maryland Location within the United States
- Location: 7912 Savage-Guilford Rd., Savage, Maryland
- Coordinates: 39°9′17″N 76°49′54″W
- Area: 6.7 acres (2.7 ha)
- Built: 1811
- NRHP reference No.: 78001470
- Added to NRHP: August 25, 1978

The Commodore Joshua Barney House is a historic home located at Savage, Howard County, Maryland, United States. It was originally situated on a 700-acre tract in modern Savage Maryland named Harry's Lot, at a time when the closest town was Elk Ridge. Both "Haary's Lot" and "Huntington Quarter" were inherited by Charles Greenberry Ridgely, sixth son of Colonel Henry Ridgley and Elizabeth Warfield Ridgley. After the death of Charles Greenberry Ridgely, Thomas Coale purchased portions of the land containing the structure. His daughter would become the famous Commodore Joshua Barney's second wife, bringing the figure from business in Baltimore. In 1809, Nathaniel F. Williams (1782-1864) married Caroline Barney, daughter of Joshua Barney, who in turn expanded an existing mill site on the property to create the Savage Mill.

It has three sections: the original 2 1/2-story brick house built by Charles Greenberry Ridgley Sr. about 1760, a 2-story frame addition built in 1941, and a one-story frame addition to the west, built in 1946. The interior of the house was altered during the 1940s when it was used as a boys' school, and about 1960 when it was converted into apartments. Its significance is tied to Commodore Joshua Barney, who was a hero of the American Revolutionary War and the War of 1812, and who lived in the house until leaving the industrial operations to family just prior to his death in 1818 from wartime wounds en route to another property owned in Kentucky. Barney rose to prominence for action during the war while living in this house including involvement in commissioning "The Star-Spangled Banner". The house is situated near the Ridgley family cemetery. It was operated as a bed and breakfast inn starting in 2000, until being placed on the market for $1.2 million in 2012. The house never sold, and had been vacant and neglected until 2017. The house is currently an occupied private residence. The seven remaining undeveloped acres surrounding the structure place it at risk of incompatible development and has been placed on the 2014 and 2015 top 10 most endangered properties list by Preservation Howard County.

Recently, it sold for 1.1 million in October 2024. As of 2025, the house remains privately owned.

The Commodore Joshua Barney House was listed on the National Register of Historic Places in 1978.

== See also ==
- List of Howard County properties in the Maryland Historical Trust
- Savage Mill Historic District
- Joshua Barney
- War of 1812
- Star-Spangled Banner (flag)
