= Henry Ridgley =

- Born: 1635; Devonshire, England
- Died: 1710 (aged 74–75)
- Known for: Justice of Anne Arundel County
- Spouse(s): Elizabeth Howard (1648–1671); Sarah Warner; Mary Stanton, widow of Mareen Duvall
- Children: Henry Ridgley (born 1669)

Henry Ridgley (1635–1710) was an early settler of Maryland.

== Early life ==
Coat of Arms of Henry Ridgley

Ridgley arrived in the colonies in 1659 and demanded 6,000 acres of land for himself, his wife and four servants: John Hall, Stephen Gill, Richard and Jane Ravens. He was an assemblyman in the Governmental Council and a vestryman in the Parish Church of St. Anne's. Charles Calvert, 3rd Baron Baltimore granted Ridgley the title of Justice of Anne Arundel County, Maryland in 1679. The Associators Assembly commissioned him as a "Captain of Foote" in 1689. He was commissioned Lieutenant-Colonel in 1694.

Among the tracts of land Ridgley patented were Wardridge on the South River in 1661; "Ridgley's Forest" now Savage, Maryland; Annapolis Junction, Maryland in 1685; and Broome.

In 1702, he sold his Annapolis estate to Charles Carroll the Settler.

== See also ==
- Hickory Ridge (Highland, Maryland)
