= Savage Mill Trail =

Hiking trail in Maryland

Coordinates: 39°8′4″N 76°49′30.4″W

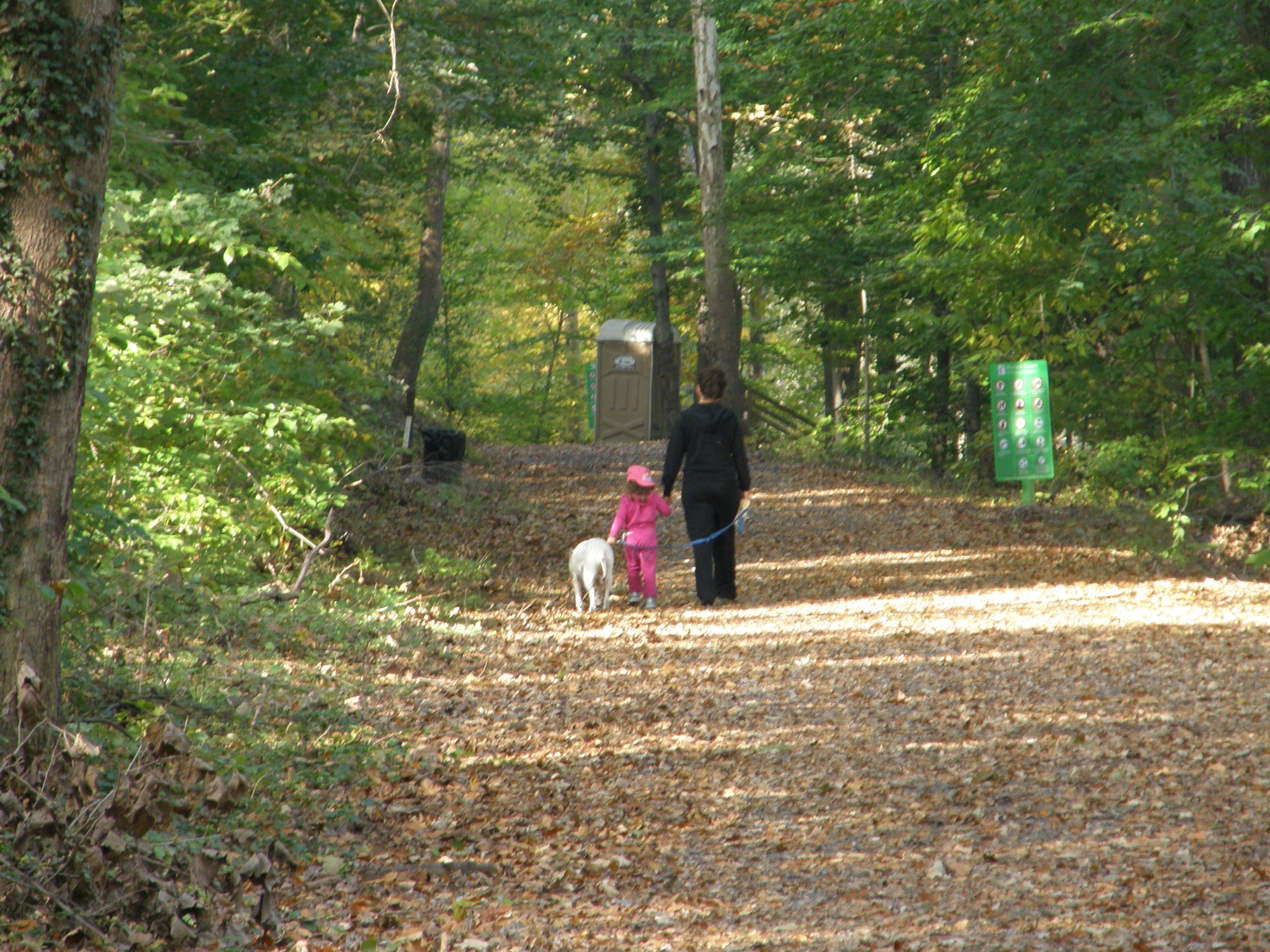
- The Savage Mill Trail heading west from the trailhead.
- Length: 0.8 mi (1.3 km)
- Location: Savage Mill, Maryland
- Trailheads: Savage Mill
- Use: Walking, jogging, biking, fishing, kayaking, and cross-country skiing
- Difficulty: Easy, level, ADA accessible
- Season: Year-round
- Months: Year-round
- Surface: Asphalt, gravel, and dirt
- Right of way: Baltimore and Ohio Railroad

The Savage Mill Trail is a 0.8-mile (1.3 km) rail trail that winds along the Little Patuxent River in Savage, Maryland. The trail was formerly part of the Baltimore and Ohio Railroad's rail corridor through central Maryland, but the Howard County Recreation and Parks Department acquired the land in 1978.

== Historical development ==
=== Historical significance ===
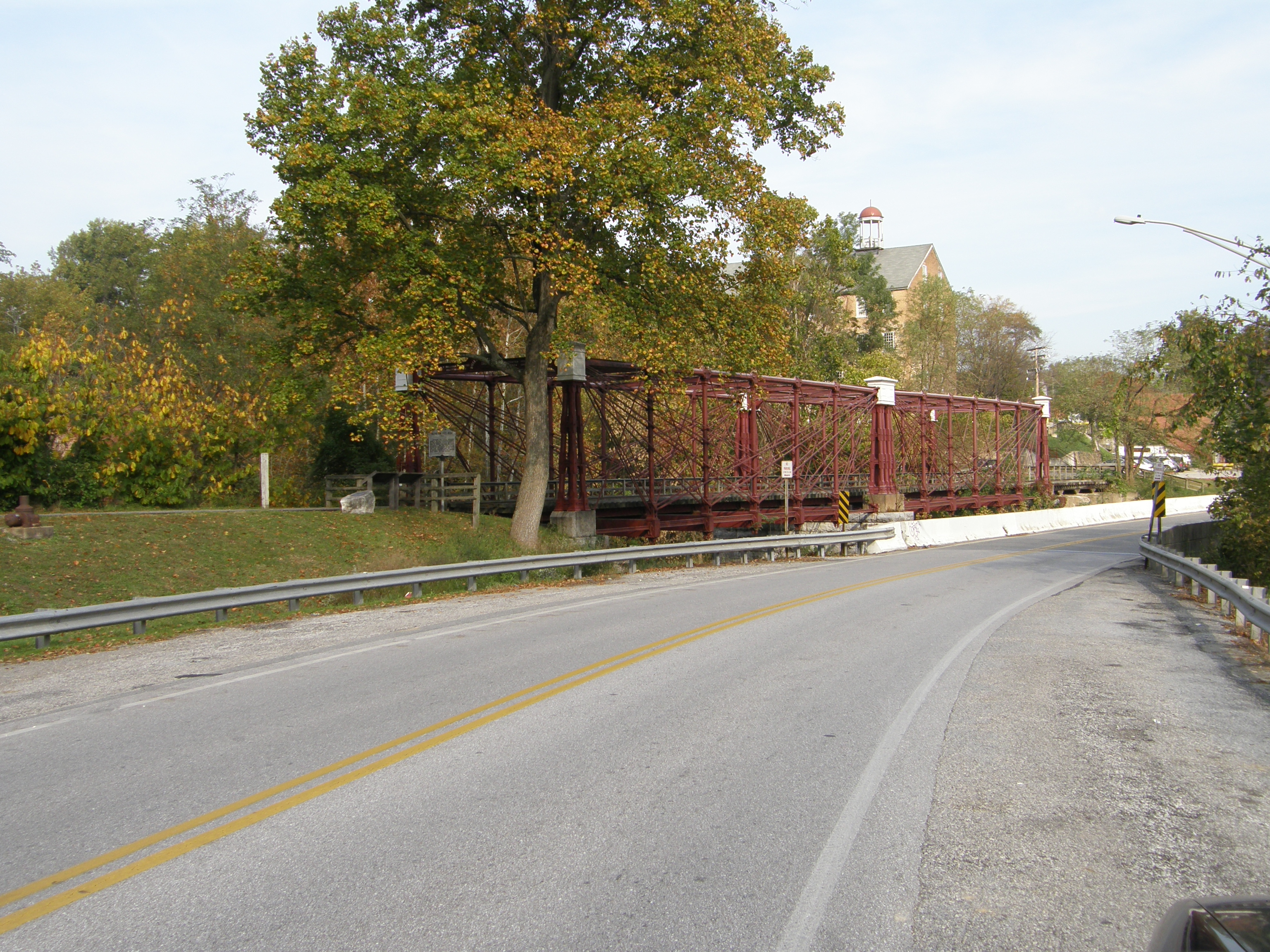
The historic Bollman truss bridge was built in 1869 and is the last of its kind in the country. It is preserved as a National Historic Landmark and sits at the trailhead of the Savage Mill Trail

The Savage Mill Trail is located in an area that became a major manufacturing center in the early 1800s. Near the beginning of the trail is a textile mill that was built between 1816 and 1823. This mill along with other manufacturing companies in the area utilized the currents of the Little and Middle Patuxent Rivers to power their factories.

At the beginning of the trail is a Bollman truss bridge, which was used by the Baltimore and Ohio Railroad during the middle of the 19th century. The Bollman truss bridge was invented in 1850 and was the first system to be made entirely of iron. This bridge was built in 1869 and is the only remaining Bollman truss bridge of its design in the country. It is now preserved as a National Historic Landmark.

During the American Civil War, Savage Mill served an important role for the Union Army beginning in 1861. Despite a limited supply of cotton, the mill was used to manufacture canvas for cannon covers and tents. In addition, the Baltimore and Ohio Railroad line to Savage Mill transported federal troops who occasionally camped in the meadow on the north side of the railroad.

In 2014, the State of Maryland announced that funds were granted to design a bike trail from Savage through the busy Route One Corridor to North Laurel. The next day an 11-year-old boy was struck in a hit and run along the proposed route.

=== Trail's history and evolution ===
The Howard County Recreation and Parks Department acquired the Savage Mill Trail in 1978. At the time, the rails had all been torn up and the pathway was completely made of dirt. Rangers from the Parks Department covered a majority of the trail with gravel in 1980, and a fresh layer of gravel is added every eight to ten years. The trail has not undergone any significant extensions or renovations since it was acquired by the Parks Department.

== Trail development ==
=== Design and construction ===
The Savage Mill Trail winds along the Little Patuxent River through the grounds of an old cotton mill. A majority of the trail is flat and covered with gravel, and it is accessible for wheelchairs, bikes, and strollers. Towards the end of the 1-mile trail, it turns into dirt before ending abruptly in the middle of a forest. A majority of the trail is surrounded by trees on one side with views of the Little Patuxent River on the other. There are a couple of picnic tables and benches located along the path, and the trail averages about 10 feet in width.

=== Trail amenities ===
Parking for the Savage Mill Trail is located along Foundry Street, where up to twenty cars can fit. From Foundry Street, it is a very short walk to the start of the trail. Once on the trail, visitors can enjoy a picnic lunch at one of two picnic areas overlooking the Little Patuxent River. There are also five intervals along the trail where visitors can access the riverbank via sets of wooden stairs or small pathways.

== Community ==
=== Trail supporters ===
The Savage Mill Trail is managed by the Howard County Recreation and Parks Department. The Parks Department is responsible for all maintenance and repairs of the trail. In addition, the Department provides four rangers per day during the summer to monitor visitor behavior and ensure that the trail is kept in quality condition.

=== Special events ===
Several annual cleanups occur along the Savage Mill Trail. Every April, members from Project Clean Stream come to the trail and clean up trash along the Little Patuxent River. Then in September, members from International Coastal Cleanup come to the trail and again clean up the area along the Little Patuxent River. Finally, members of the Johns Hopkins Applied Physics Lab host an annual trail cleanup in late October or early November.

In addition to trail cleanups, the Howard County Recreation and Parks Department is in the middle of its 5-year Maryland Amphibian and Reptile Atlas. Members of the local community are encouraged to hike Howard County trails, including the Savage Mill Trail, and take pictures of any nature that they find.

The Savage Mill Trail is also the location for occasional community group gatherings. Columbia Dogs on the Go, a local dog-walking group in Maryland, is one group that holds events for its members to walk their dogs along the trail.

== Flora and fauna ==
Ten notable bird species inhabit the Savage Mill Trail. Each of these birds can be spotted along the trail between March and May except the great egret, which can be found between August and November. These birds include:

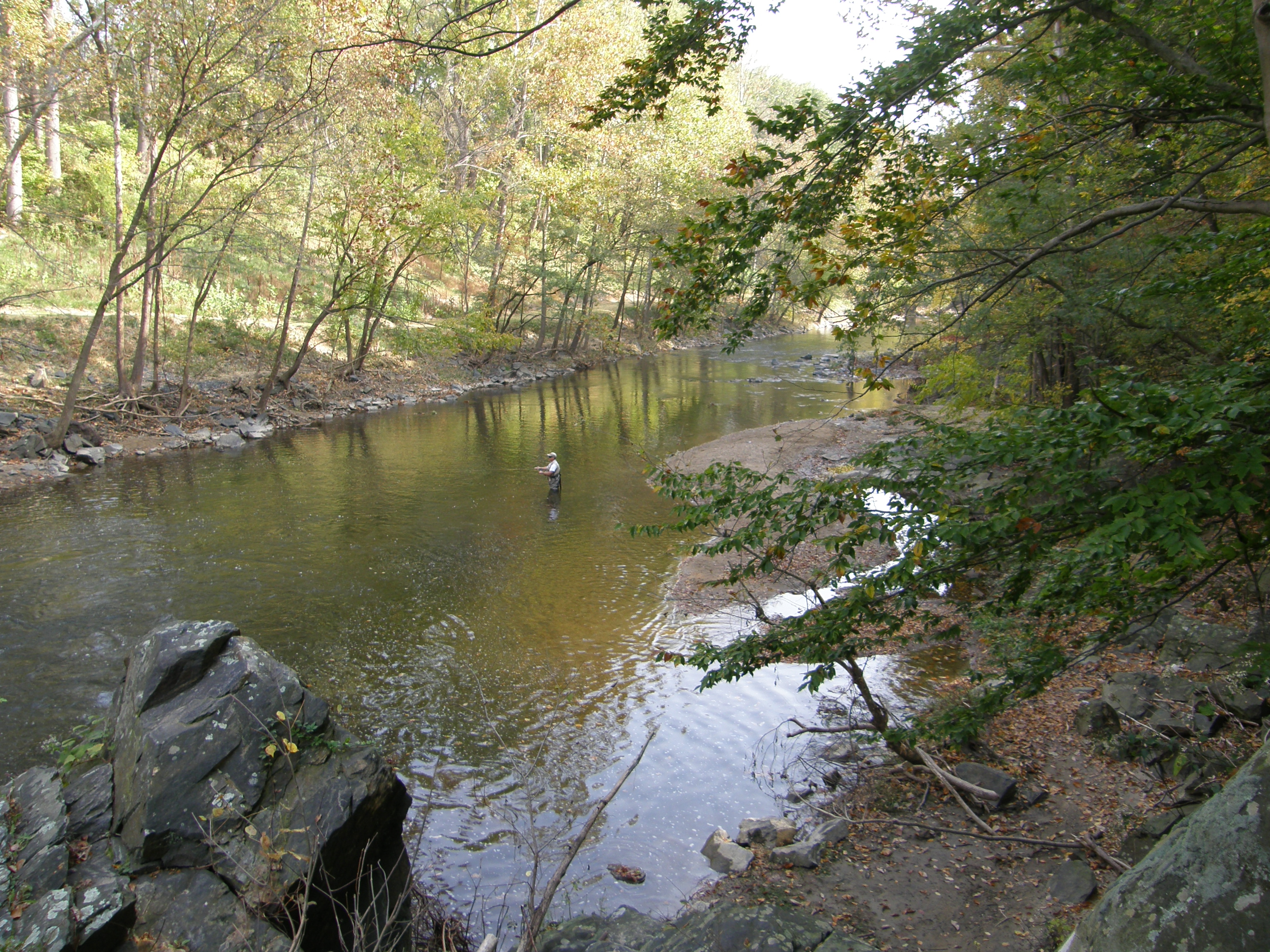
Many visitors of the Savage Mill Trail utilize the adjacent Little Patuxent River to fish for trout and other species

- Black-billed cuckoo
- Cerulean warbler
- Great egret
- Golden-winged warbler
- Least flycatcher
- Lincoln's sparrow
- Mourning warbler
- Northern bobwhite
- Prothonotary warbler
- Yellow-throated warbler

In addition, four types of mammals inhabit the Savage Mill Trail and are most often spotted during the warm months of the year:

- Eastern chipmunk
- Eastern gray squirrel
- Raccoon
- White-tailed deer

Finally, the Little Patuxent River is home to over seven species of fish. The Parks Department stocks the river with trout during the first week of October, the last week of February, and the first week of March. Fishermen can expect to find the following fish when visiting the trail:

- Bluegill
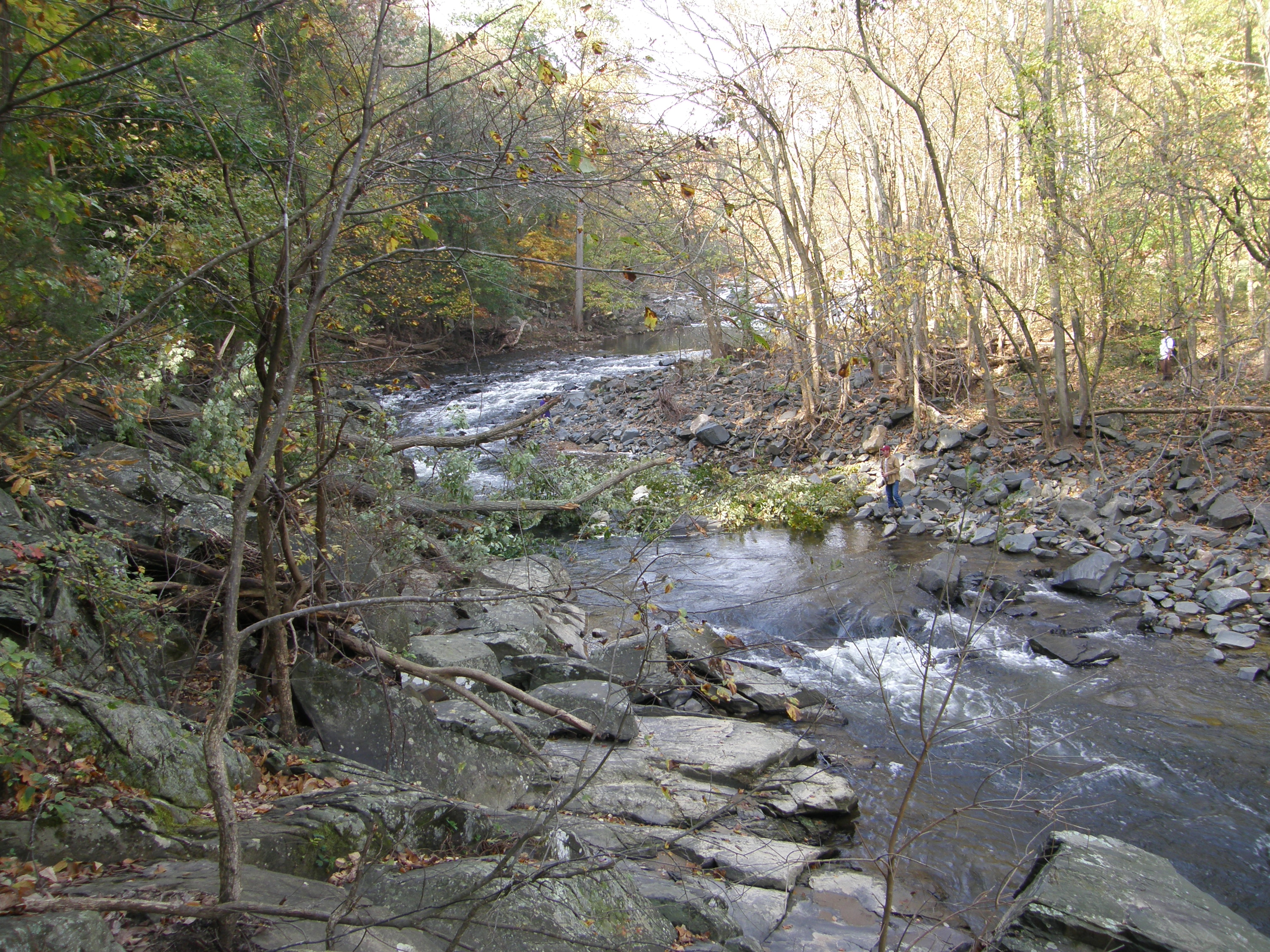
  Trees lining the Little Patuxent River, which runs adjacent to the Savage Mill Trail
- Brown trout
- Carp
- Golden trout
- Rainbow trout
- Redeye bass
- White sucker

In addition to wildlife, the Savage Mill Trail is home to seven different types of trees. White and red oaks line a large part of the trail, but all of the trees include:

- Beechwood
- Eastern white pine
- Hickory
- Northern red oak
- Sugar maple
- Tulip tree
- White oak
