= Savage, Maryland =

- Census-designated place
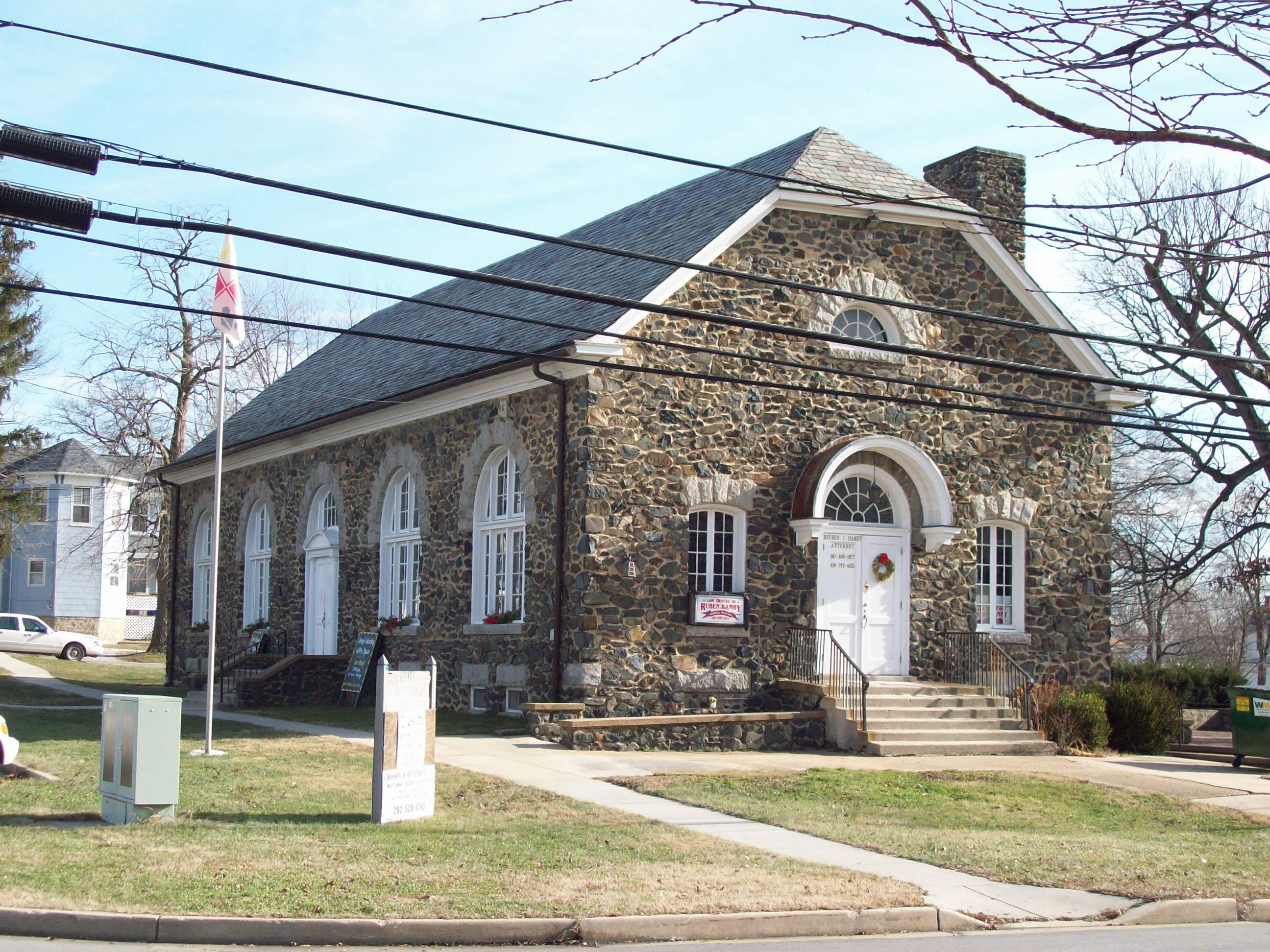
- Carroll Baldwin Hall

- Location within Maryland Location within the United States
- Coordinates: 39°8′15″N 76°49′26″W
- Country: United States
- State: Maryland
- County: Howard
- Established: 1822

Area
  - Total: 2.74 sq mi (7.10 km^{2})
  - Land: 2.74 sq mi (7.09 km^{2})
  - Water: 0.0039 sq mi (0.01 km^{2})
- Elevation: 210 ft (64 m)

Population (2020)
  - Total: 7,542
  - Density: 2,756.5/sq mi (1,064.29/km^{2})
- Time zone: UTC−5 (EST)
  - Summer (DST): UTC−4 (EDT)
- ZIP Code: 20763
- Area codes: 240, 301
- FIPS code: 24-70475
- GNIS feature ID: 591233

Savage is an unincorporated community and census-designated place located in Howard County, Maryland, United States, approximately 18 miles (29 km) south of Baltimore and 21 miles (34 km) north of Washington, D.C. It is situated close to the city of Laurel and to the planned community of Columbia. As of the 2020 census, it had a population of 7,542. The former mill town is a registered historic place, and has several original buildings preserved within and around the Savage Mill Historic District.

== History ==
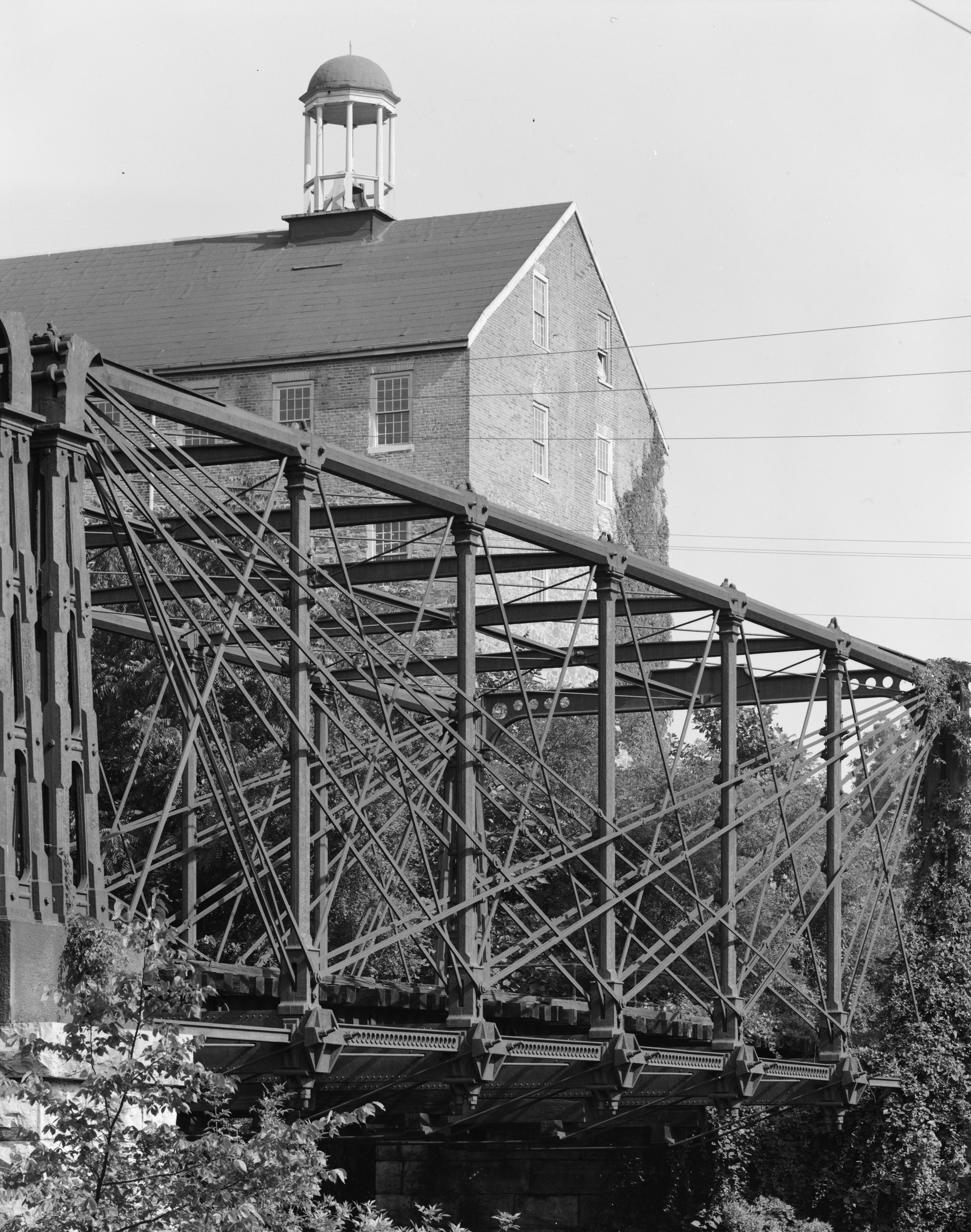
Bollman bridge with Savage Mill tower in background in 1970

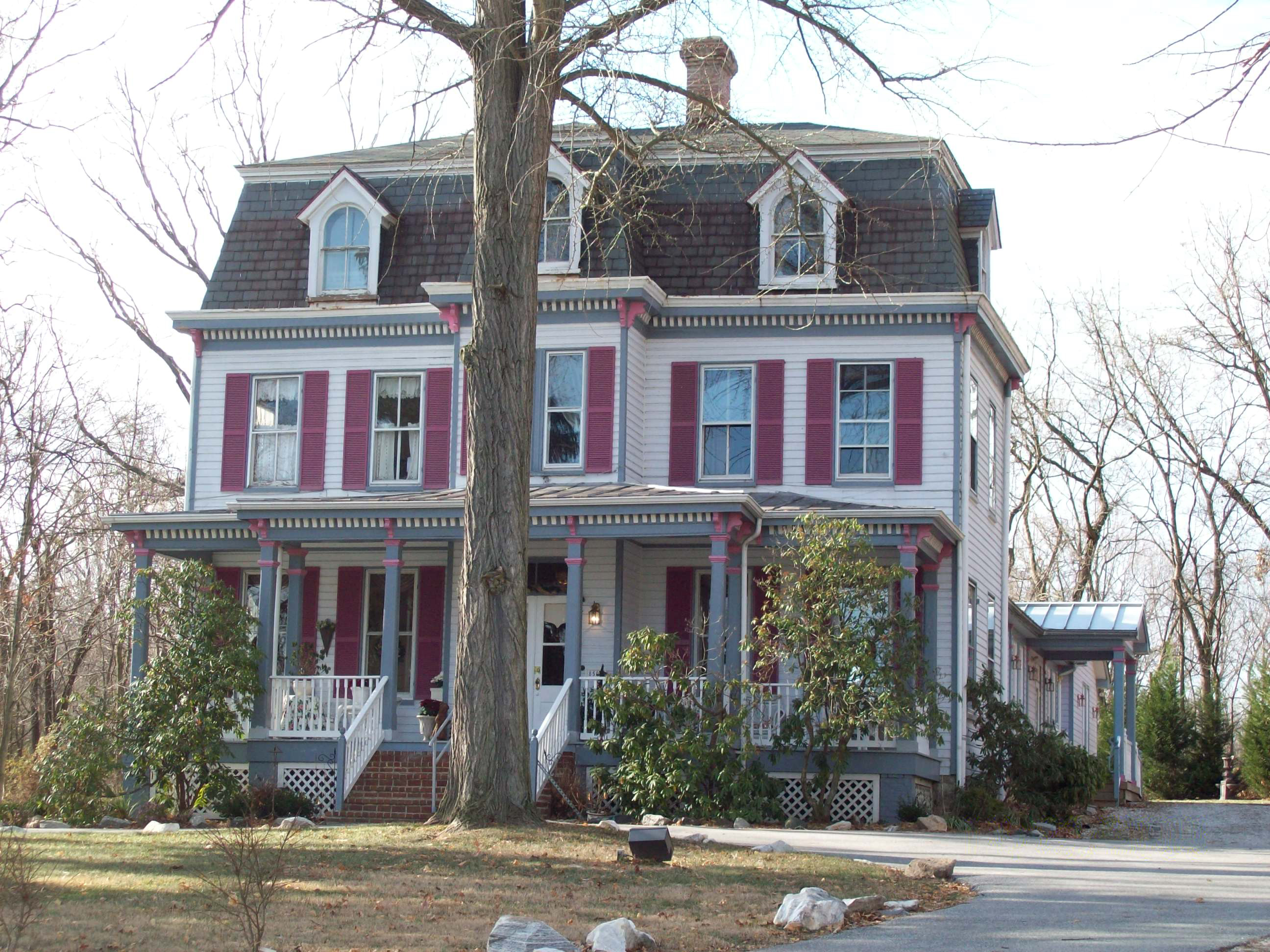
Savage Mill Manor House in December 2008

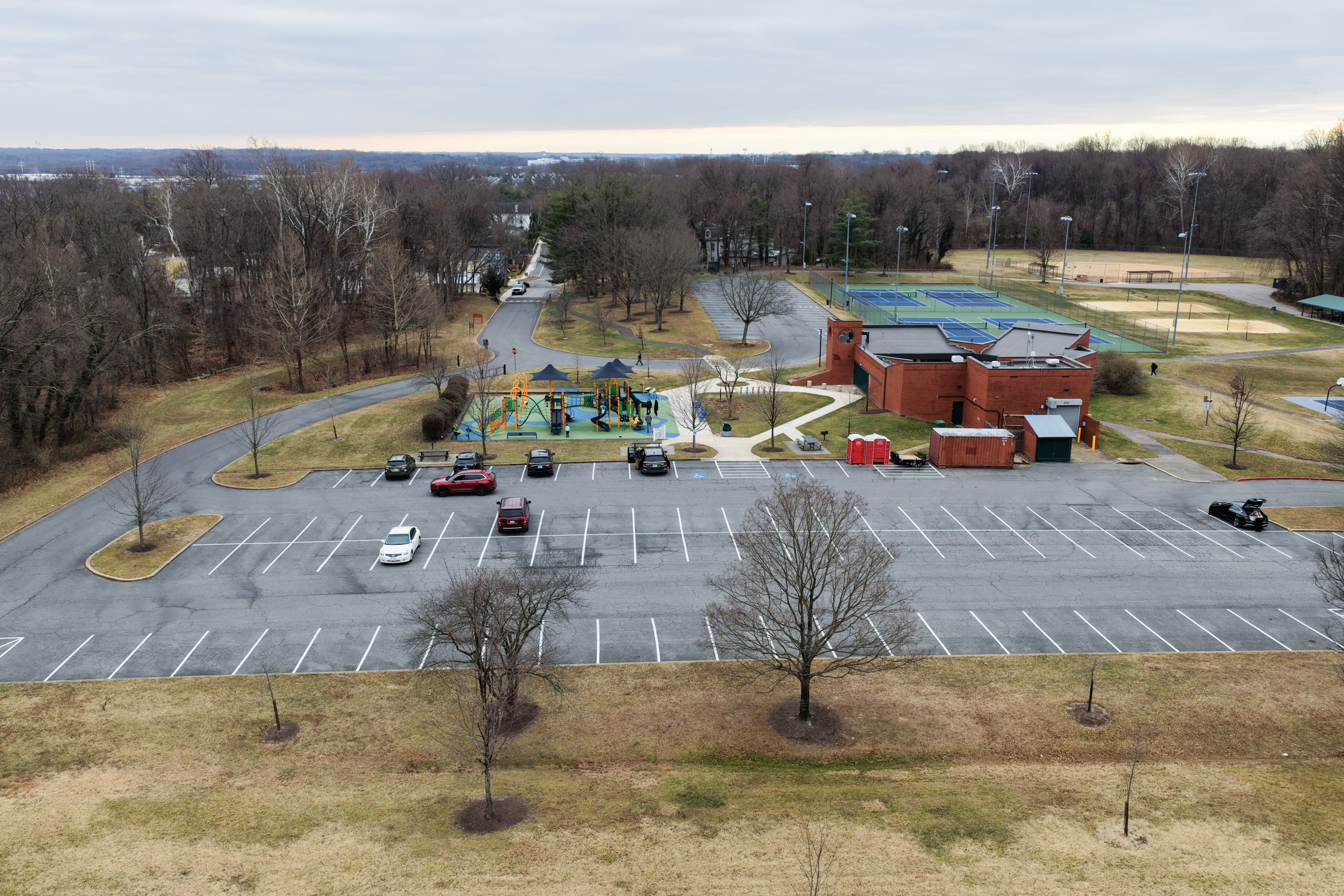
An aerial view of Savage Park in December 2025.

=== 17th century ===
The lands of present-day Savage were first settled in approximately 1650. Colonel Henry Ridgley surveyed the land around Savage Mill and nearby Annapolis Junction, Maryland in 1685, naming the tract "Ridgely's Forrest". Joseph White was the grandson of Peregrine White, the first child born of the Mayflower expedition.

=== 18th century ===
In 1734, he opened a gristmill on land patented as "Whites Fortune" and "Mill Land". The parcels were consolidated to become "Whites Contrivance".

A rich vein of American industrial history lies in Savage. When the textile industry was in its heyday, Savage was an important manufacturing center, its mills harnessing the water power on the falls of the Little and Middle Patuxent rivers.

The town was named for John Savage, a Philadelphia merchant with interest in a mill on the falls of the Little Patuxent. In 1822, he and his associates, the Williams brothers, chartered the Savage Manufacturing Company, purchasing 900 acres (360 ha) of the White property for $6,666.67. The company produced sails for the clipper ships that sailed out of Baltimore Harbor, in addition to a wide variety of other cotton products.

=== 19th century ===
The cotton milling industry started in Maryland in the 18th century and flourished in the 19th century. Cotton was shipped cheaply from Southern ports and hauled overland by mule and oxen teams to the mills before rail transportation served Savage. In 1835 the Washington branch of the B&O Railroad was completed, and Savage Station was established on the line about a mile southeast of the present mill. A spur of the B&O was laid to the Savage factory in 1887, and it was at this time that the famous Bollman Truss Railroad Bridge was moved to its present site from another location. Originally built in 1852, it was one of about 100 on the B&O line. Beloved by railroad buffs, the iron truss bridge is the only one of its type in the world, and, along with the Savage Mill, is on the National Register of Historic Places.

The Savage post office opened on January 13, 1836, on "Yankee Hill" at the corner of Washington and Foundry streets with Amos Adams Williams as postmaster. It would later become a branch of the Patuxent Bank of Laurel.

Parts of the Savage Mill are said to date from about 1820, and historians have recorded that the mill once had an iron foundry that made many kinds of machinery, specializing in textile manufacturing. The operation of the mill was greatly expanded in 1880 with the installation of steam power. Army uniforms, field tents, and vehicle covers were made.

=== 20th century ===
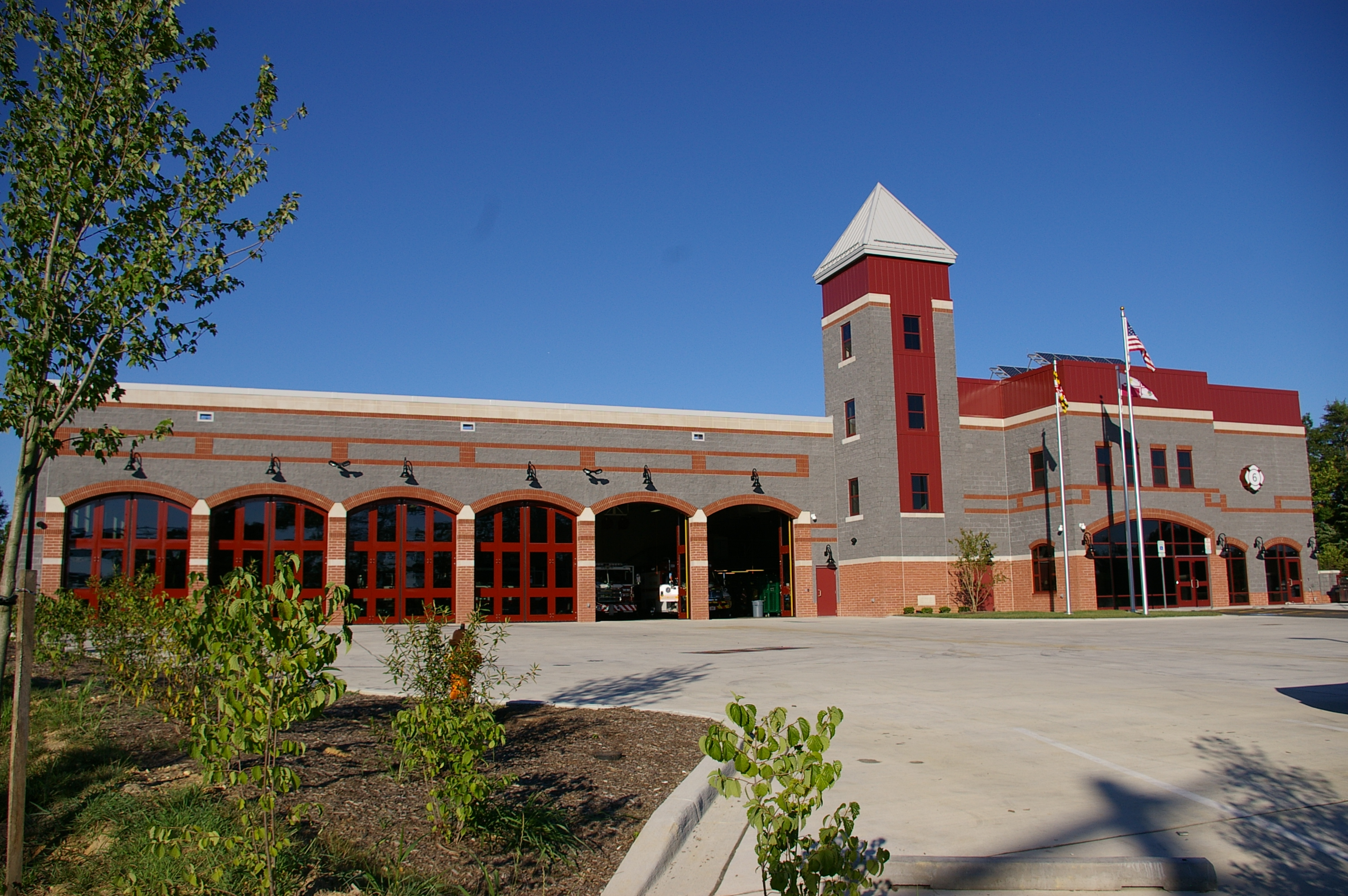
Station Six, built in 2013 on Corridor Road in Savage

A renovation program began in 1984 that established Savage Mill as a major permanent marketplace. The Savage Mill Manor House is down the street from the mill and has also been completely renovated. It is now used to host weddings, parties, and special events.

Carroll Baldwin Hall once housed the Savage branch of the Howard County Library. It was built in the early 1920s as a memorial to Carroll Baldwin, former president of the manufacturing company. The Baldwins managed the company from 1859 to 1911.

In 1880, the population reached 2,617 residents, and increased to 2,930 in 1890.

In 1929, Dr. Wolman issued a recommendation that did not pass, to dam and flood the Patuxent River Valley around Savage for a dedicated water source.

Savage remained a mostly segregated town for most of its early history until the Civil rights movement of the 1950s. Factory work at the mill was almost exclusively for white workers with exceptions of black apprentices at the forges in the antebellum era. The community slowly integrated in the latter half of the 20th century.

The Savage Volunteer Fire Company was founded in 1937 with a station at Savage-Guilford Road. The station relocated to Lincoln Street in 1957, and Corridor Road in 2013.

In June 1972, Hurricane Agnes flooded the local rivers, raising the Patuxent River 25.4 feet, and washing out the road bridge. A replacement opened on September 10, 1975.

In 1976, county executive Edward L. Cochran convened a waste task force that reviewed submissions for a 538-acre landfill at route One and 32 owned by Realty Trust and Chase Manhattan Mortgage, with commercial dumping sites at the Savage quarry. Alpha Ridge Landfill was selected instead, but a new quarry would eventually take its place.

A new $7 million elementary school was built in Savage in 1988, named Bollman Bridge Elementary.

== Geography ==
Savage is located in southeastern Howard County, bordered by Columbia to the north and North Laurel to the southwest. U.S. Route 1 (Washington Boulevard) forms the southeast edge of the CDP. The historic Savage mill village is located in the southern part of the CDP, while a major freeway interchange between Interstate 95 and Maryland Route 32 sits on the northern edge of the CDP.

The Middle Patuxent and Little Patuxent rivers join to the west of the mill village. The Middle Patuxent (above the confluence) and the Little Patuxent (below the confluence) form the southwest edge of the CDP. The river drops about 70 feet (21 m) in 0.6 miles (1.0 km) to form the falls that powered the early mills. The Little Patuxent continues southeast to join the Patuxent River at Crofton.

== Demographics ==
Historical population
Census	Pop.	Note	%±
2020	7,542		—
U.S. Decennial Census

=== 2020 census ===
As of the 2020 census, Savage had a population of 7,542. The median age was 37.1 years. 23.9% of residents were under the age of 18 and 11.0% of residents were 65 years of age or older. For every 100 females there were 95.2 males, and for every 100 females age 18 and over there were 93.4 males age 18 and over.

100.0% of residents lived in urban areas, while 0.0% lived in rural areas.

There were 2,765 households in Savage, of which 35.0% had children under the age of 18 living in them. Of all households, 48.5% were married-couple households, 18.5% were households with a male householder and no spouse or partner present, and 26.2% were households with a female householder and no spouse or partner present. About 24.7% of all households were made up of individuals and 7.6% had someone living alone who was 65 years of age or older.

There were 2,876 housing units, of which 3.9% were vacant. The homeowner vacancy rate was 0.7% and the rental vacancy rate was 6.6%.

Racial composition as of the 2020 census
Race	Number	Percent
White	3,077	40.8%
Black or African American	2,271	30.1%
American Indian and Alaska Native	48	0.6%
Asian	839	11.1%
Native Hawaiian and Other Pacific Islander	1	0.0%
Some other race	662	8.8%
Two or more races	644	8.5%
Hispanic or Latino (of any race)	1,117	14.8%

== See also ==
- Savage Mill History
- Bollman Truss Railroad Bridge
- Commodore Joshua Barney House
- Murder of Pam Basu
- Savage Mill
- Savage Mill Historic District
- Savage Mill Trail
- Savage - A Former Sundown Town
- John Savage - The Namesake of Savage, Maryland
