= Slipping (disambiguation) =

Slipping is a technique used in boxing.

Slipping may also refer to:

- Slipping, a failure of a knot
- "Slippin'", a song by DMX
- "Slipping", a song by Geddy Lee from My Favourite Headache

== See also ==
- Slip (disambiguation)
- Slippage (disambiguation)
- Slippery (disambiguation)
