= Slipper (disambiguation) =

A slipper is "a semi-closed type of indoor/outdoor shoe".

Slipper may also refer to:

== Footwear ==
- Ballet shoe
- Flip-flops

== Other ==
- Slipper clutch, a type of clutch designed for motorcycles
- Slipper Island, an island off the coast of New Zealand's North Island
- Slipper lobster, a family of crustaceans
- Operation Slipper, the Australian Defence Force (ADF) contribution to the war in Afghanistan

== People with the surname ==
- Jack Slipper (1924–2005), British police officer
- James Slipper (born 1989), Australian rugby union player
- Peter Slipper (born 1950), Australian politician

== See also ==
- Glass slipper (disambiguation)
- Slipperiness
- Slippering
- Slippery (disambiguation)
