= Slips =

Slips (or SLIPS) may refer to:

- Slips (oil drilling)
- SLIPS (Slippery Liquid Infused Porous Surfaces)
- SLIPS (Sri Lanka Interbank Payment System)
- Slip (cricket), often used in the plural form
- The Slips, a UK electronic music duo

== See also ==
- Slip (disambiguation)
