= Slippery Rock =

Slippery Rock may refer to the following:

- Slippery Rock, Pennsylvania, a borough in Butler County
- Slippery Rock Creek, a tributary of the Beaver River in Pennsylvania
- Slippery Rock University, Pennsylvania, a census-designated place
- Slippery Rock University of Pennsylvania
- Slippery Rock Township, Butler County, Pennsylvania
- Slippery Rock Township, Lawrence County, Pennsylvania

== See also ==
- Slippery Rock Gorge Trail
