= Isabella Dodd =

Isabella Dodd may refer to:

- Catherine Isabella Dodd (1860–1932), English academic
- Isabella Ruth Eakin Dodd (1861–1937), American missionary
- Bella Dodd (1904–1969), American teacher
