= McConnell's Mill Covered Bridge =

- U.S. National Register of Historic Places
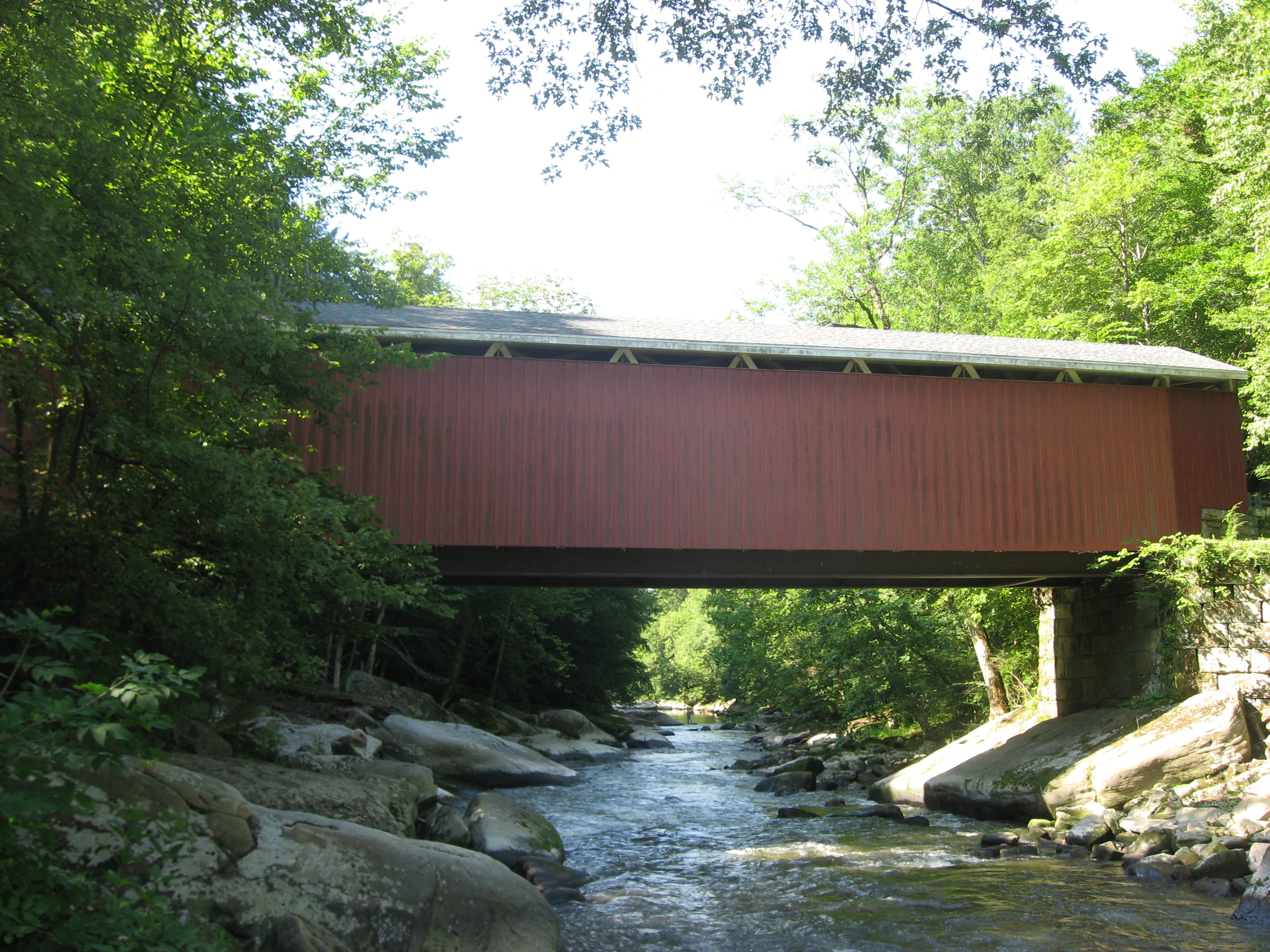
- Upstream side of the bridge

- Location within Pennsylvania Location within the United States
- Location: McConnell's Mill Road, Slippery Rock Township, Lawrence County, Pennsylvania, United States
- Nearest city: Rose Point
- Coordinates: 40°57′10″N 80°10′13″W
- Area: 0.1 acres (0.040 ha)
- Built: 1874
- Architectural style: Howe truss bridge
- MPS: Lawrence County Covered Bridges TR
- NRHP reference No.: 80003544
- Added to NRHP: June 27, 1980

The McConnell's Mill Covered Bridge is an historic, wooden covered bridge that is located in Slippery Rock Township, Lawrence County, Pennsylvania, United States. It spans the Slippery Rock Creek in McConnells Mill State Park, southeast of Rose Point.

== History and architectural features ==
Built in 1874, this historic bridge is a Howe truss that was built on stone foundations and is supported by steel girders.

Unlike many Pennsylvania counties, Lawrence County never possessed many covered bridges; perhaps only five such bridges were ever built in the county. Today, only the McConnell's Mill Covered Bridge and the Banks Covered Bridge near Volant remain.

The McConnell's Mill bridge is particularly significant for its usage of the Howe truss design; it is one of only four extant Howe truss bridges statewide.

In 1980, the bridge was recognized for its historical significance by being placed on the National Register of Historic Places, along with the Banks Bridge.

== Gallery ==
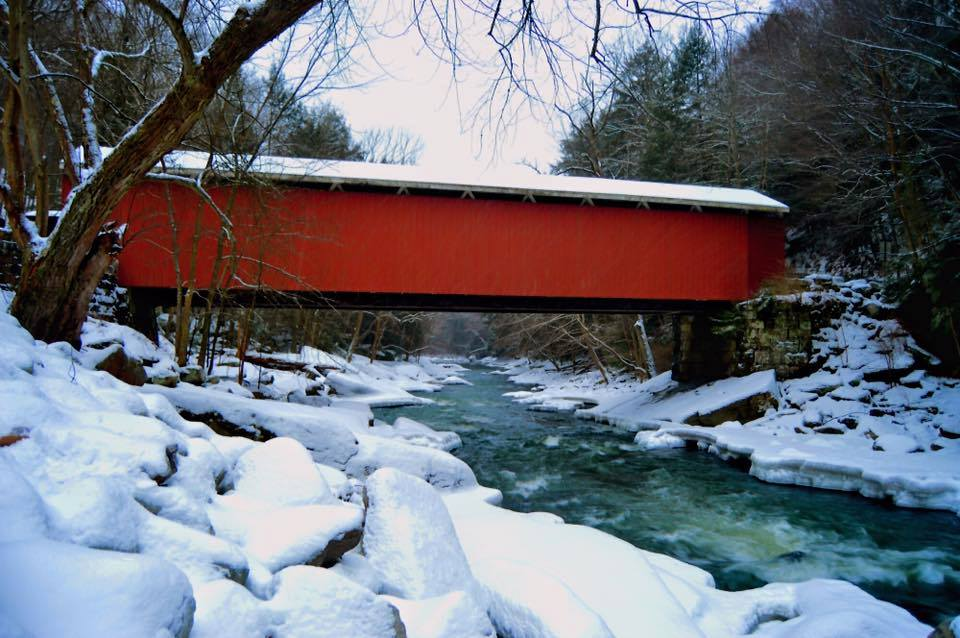

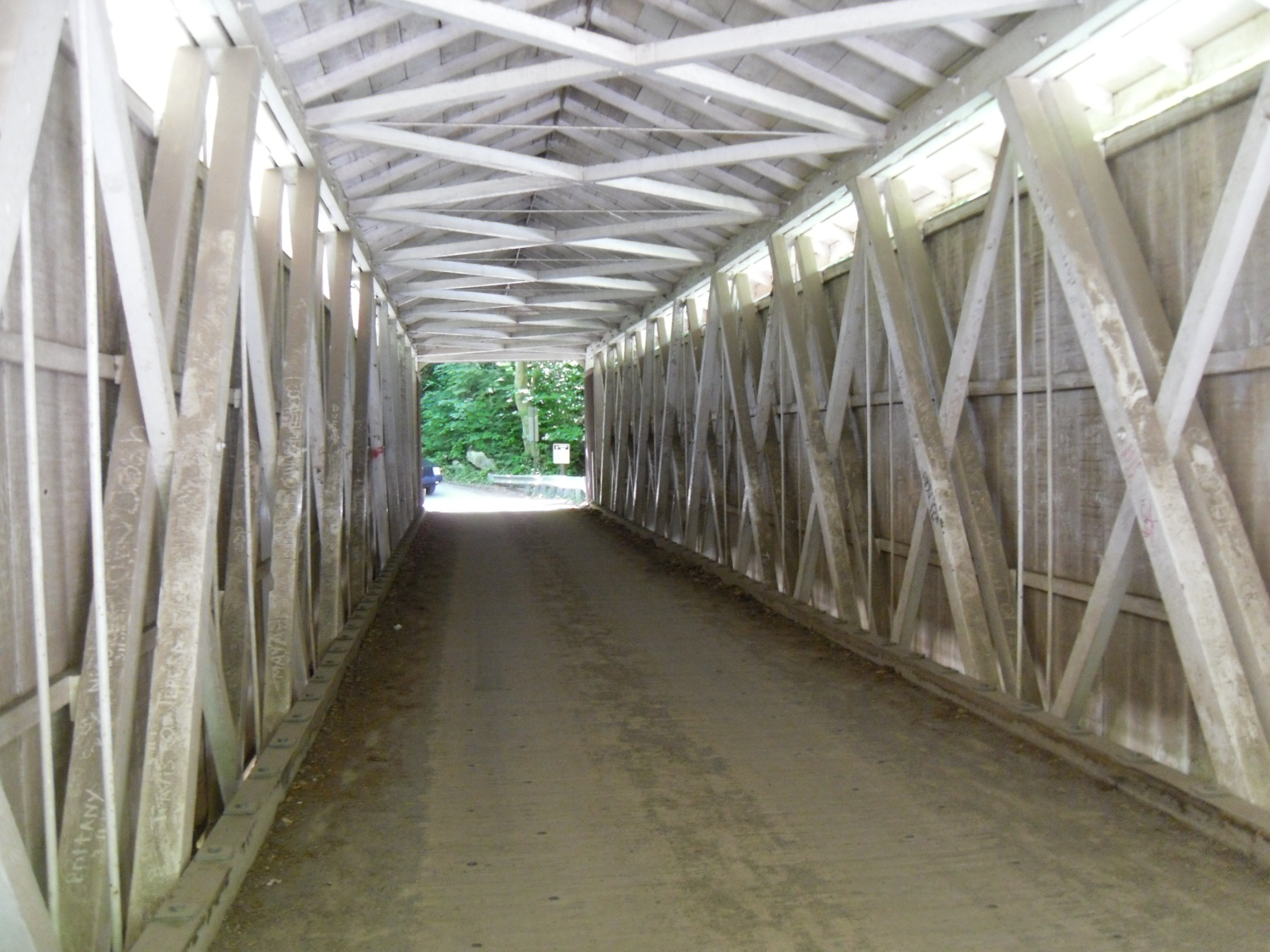

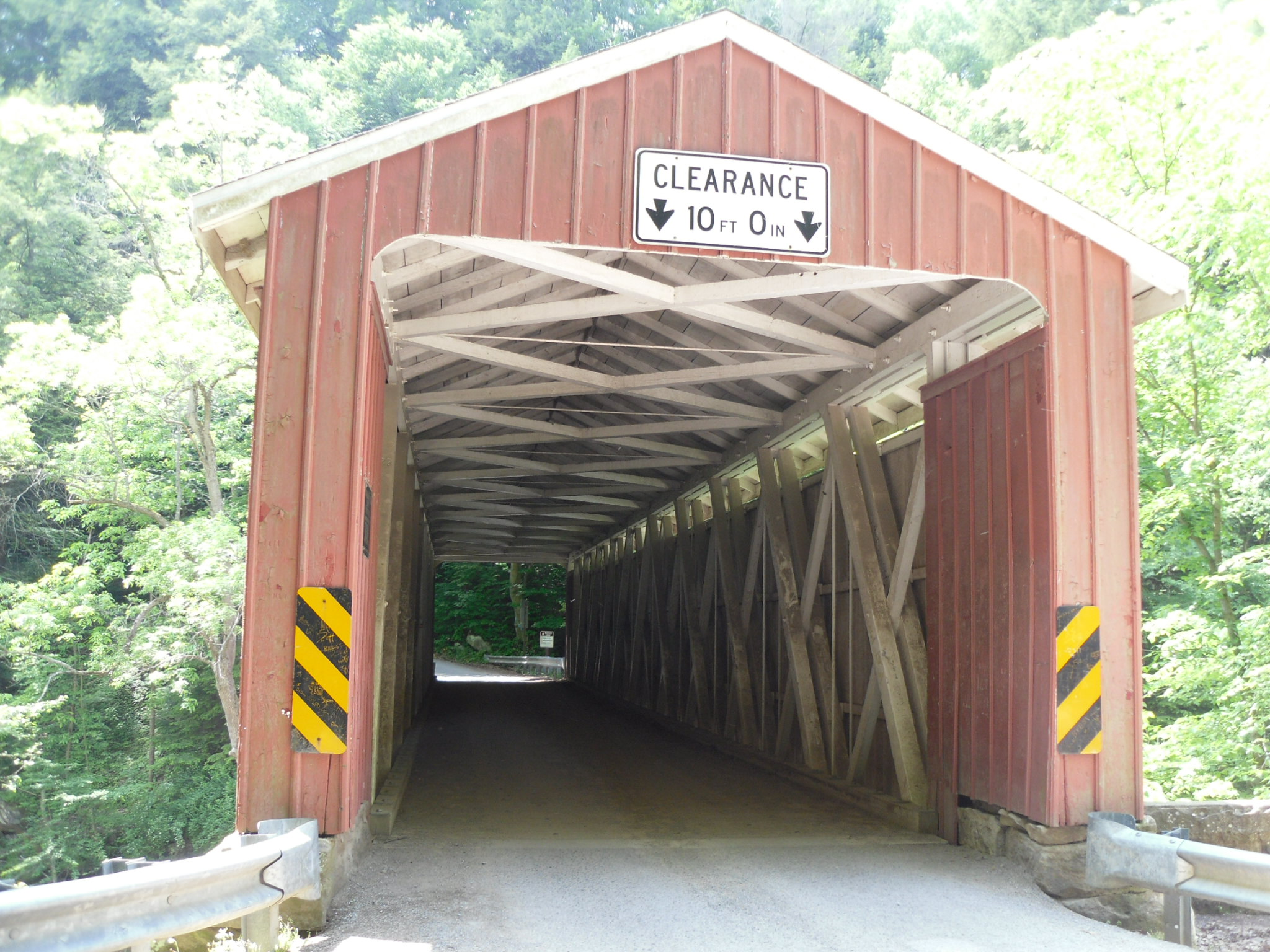

== See also ==
- List of bridges documented by the Historic American Engineering Record in Pennsylvania
