= Slippery When Wet (disambiguation) =

Slippery When Wet is a 1986 album by Bon Jovi.

Slippery When Wet may also refer to:

- Slippery When Wet (Bud Shank album), 1959
- "Slippery When Wet" (Commodores song), 1975
- "Slippery When Wet" (Nyanda song), 2013
- Slippery When Wet, the name of the Mother in The Trail to Oregon! by StarKid Productions

== See also ==
- Slipperiness, a condition of a surface being easily slipped on or against
