= Slip =

Slip or The Slip may refer to:

- Slip (clothing), an underdress or underskirt

== Music ==
- The Slip (band), a rock band
- Slip (album), a 1993 album by the band Quicksand
- The Slip (album) (2008), a.k.a. Halo 27, the seventh studio album by Nine Inch Nails
- "Slip" (song), a 2013 song by Stooshe
- "Slip", a song by Linkin Park from LP Underground 11
- "Slip", a song by Shawn Austin from the 2022 EP Planes Don't Wait
- "Slip", an instrumental by Deadmau5 from the 2008 album Random Album Title
- "The Slip", a 2024 song by the Smile

== Nickname ==
- Slip Carr (1899–1971), Australian rugby union player and Olympic sprinter
- Slip Madigan (1896–1966), American college football player and multi-sport college coach

== Science and technology ==
=== Biology ===
- Slip (fish), also known as Black Sole
- Slip (horticulture), a small cutting of a plant as a specimen or for grafting
- Muscle slip, a branching of a muscle, in anatomy

=== Computing and telecommunications ===
- SLIP (programming language), (Symmetric LIst Processing language)
- Slip (telecommunication), a positional displacement in a sequence of transmitted symbols
- Serial Line Internet Protocol, a mostly obsolete encapsulation of the Internet Protocol

=== Earth science ===
- Silicic-dominated Large Igneous Province (SLIP), a geological feature consisting of a large area of igneous rocks of a certain type
- Slip (geology), the relative movement of geological features present on either side of a fault plane
- Land slip or landslide, commonly called a slip in New Zealand

=== Materials ===
- Slip (ceramics), a mix of water and clay (clay slurry) used to produce ceramic wares
- Slip (materials science), the process by which a dislocation motion produces plastic deformation

=== Mechanical systems ===
- Slip (vehicle dynamics), the relative motion between a tire and the road surface
- Slip (electrical motor), the difference in speed between the frequency supplied to an induction motor and rotor shaft speed
- Slip, a type of rail switch
- Slip gauge or gauge block, a system for producing precision lengths

=== Psychology ===
- Slip (treatment), a temporary return to a negative behavior after therapy intended to correct that behavior
- Freudian slip, an error in speech, memory or physical action that arises from the unconscious mind

=== Other uses in science and technology ===
- Slip (aerodynamics), an aerodynamic state in which an aircraft is moving sideways as well as forward relative to the oncoming airflow
- Slipway, a ramp on the shore by which ships or boats can be moved to and from the water

== Television ==
- "Slip" (Better Call Saul), an episode of Better Call Saul
- Slip (TV series), an American comedy television series
- "The Slip" (The Amazing World of Gumball), an episode of The Amazing World of Gumball

== Other uses ==
- Slip (cricket), a fielding position in cricket
- Slip (needlework), an embroidered or appliquéd image of a plant-cutting
- Slip opinion, a kind of judicial opinion, published on the day of the decision and subject to later revision
- Ferry slip, a specialized docking facility that receives a ferryboat
- Packing slip, a shipping document that accompanies delivery packages
- The Slip, a section of Swansea Beach

== See also ==
- Slippage (disambiguation)
- Slippery (disambiguation)
