= Slippery Rock Gorge Trail =

Hiking trail in Pennsylvania, United States

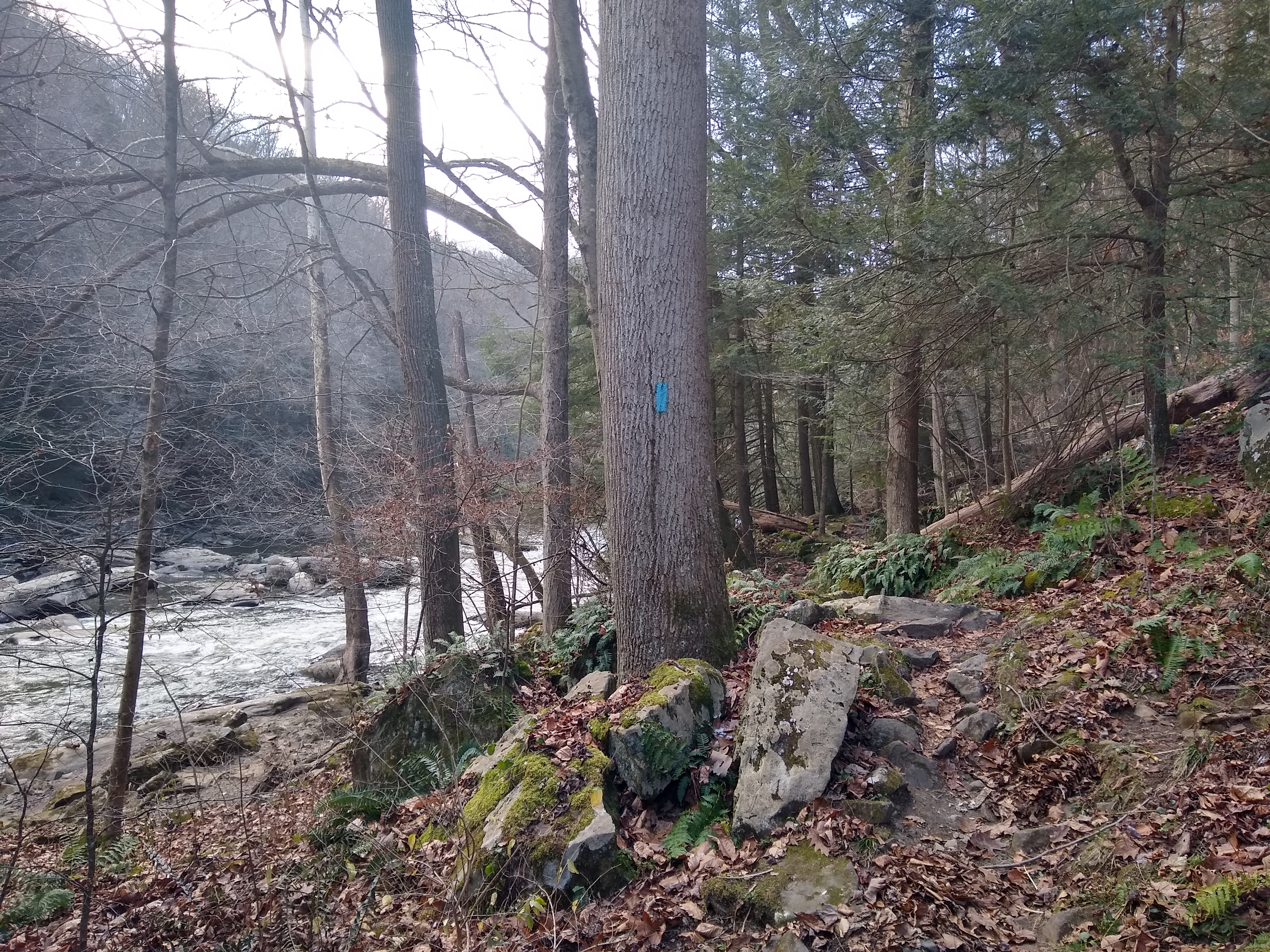
- The Slippery Rock Gorge Trail alongside Slippery Rock Creek
- Length: 6.1 mi (9.8 km)
- Location: Lawrence County, Pennsylvania, US
- Trailheads: McConnells Mill State Park
- Use: Hiking
- Elevation change: Moderate
- Difficulty: Strenuous
- Season: Year-round
- Hazards: Uneven and rocky terrain, rattlesnakes, mosquitoes, ticks, black bears

The Slippery Rock Gorge Trail is a 6.1-mile (9.8 km) hiking trail in western Pennsylvania, which follows Slippery Rock Creek and then Hell Run within McConnells Mill State Park. Part of the route is within Slippery Rock Gorge, which is a National Natural Landmark. It has been named one of the most challenging and scenic hiking trails in Pennsylvania.

== History and route ==
The Slippery Rock Gorge Trail was first proposed in 1990 by Pennsylvania trail care volunteers, who felt that the western part of the state needed more scenic and rugged trails. The tough topography in Slippery Rock Gorge slowed down construction efforts, and the trail was finally christened in 1994.

The route is traditionally described as beginning at the Eckert and Breakneck Bridges Area off of Cheeseman Road in a fairly remote area of McConnells Mill State Park. The trail begins at Eckert Bridge, along the right bank of Slippery Rock Creek and following it downstream, to the southwest. The trail gradually rises above the creek and at 1.1 miles traverses a bench carved into a cliff. The trail then descends to the creek and rises back up several times, occasionally heading away from the creek to tackle side gorges formed by tributary streams. This area frequently experiences landslides. At 3.8 miles the trail turns sharply to the northwest and climbs up the side gorge formed by Hell Run. At 4.6 miles, the trail encounters two small natural bridges where side streams eroded under the bedrock. When the leaves are down, there is a view of Hell's Hollow Falls below the trail to the left. Near the top of the side gorge, the trail crosses Hell Run on footbridges twice, and ends at a parking lot off of Shaffer Road at the far western edge of McConnells Mill State Park.

The entire route of the Slippery Rock Gorge Trail has since been added to the North Country National Scenic Trail.
