= Cleat (shoe) =

Projection on sole of shoe

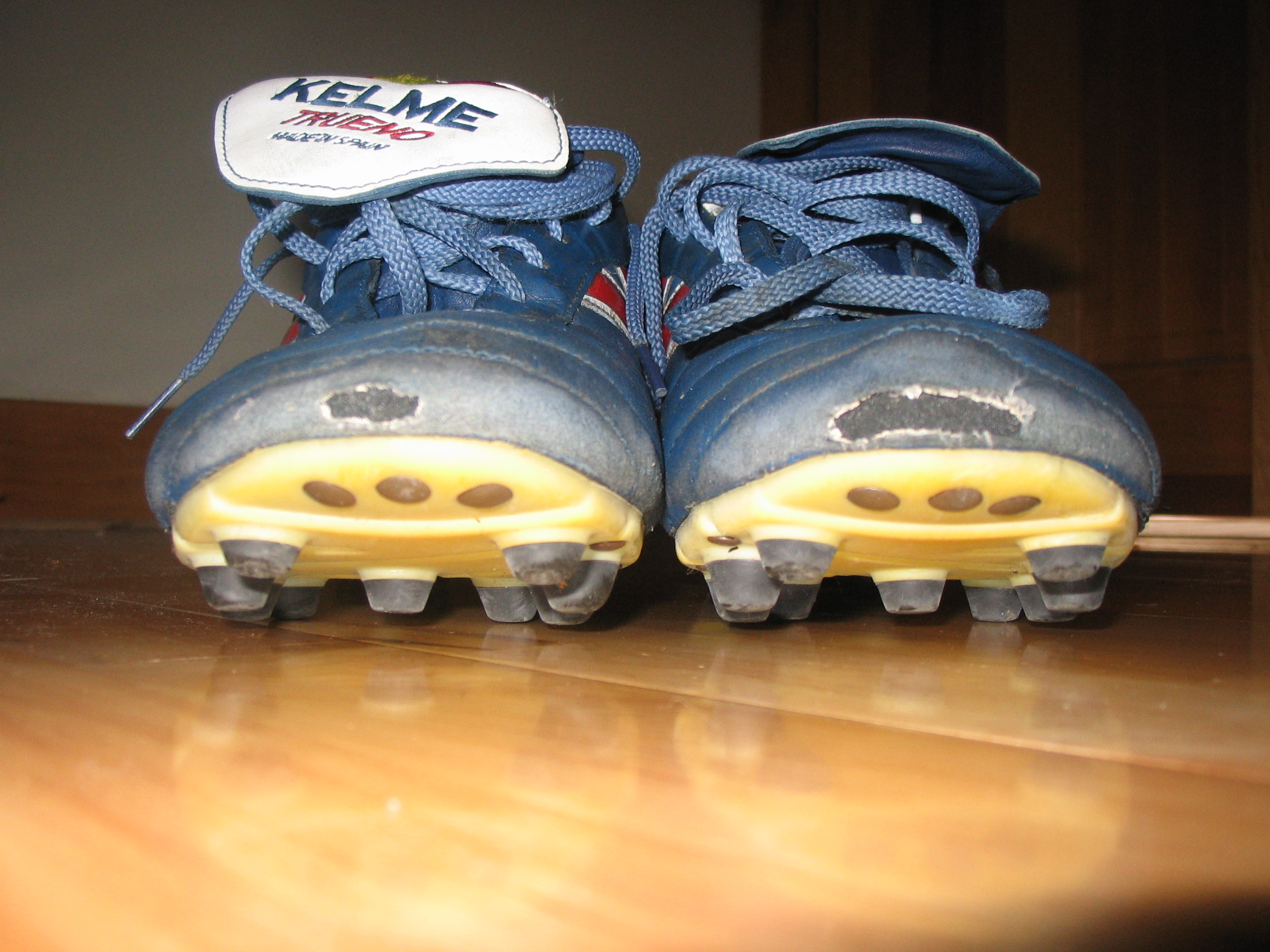
Football boots have studs on their soles

Cleats or studs are protrusions on the sole of a shoe or on an external attachment to a shoe that provide additional traction on a soft or slippery surface. They can be conical or blade-like in shape and can be made of plastic, rubber or metal. The type worn depends on the environment of play: grass, ice, artificial turf, or other grounds.

In American English, the term "cleats" is used synecdochically to refer to shoes featuring such protrusions. In British English the more common term for sports shoes with cleats or studs is boots, especially when referring to particular sports (e.g. Football boots, Rugby boots etc.).

== History ==
It is thought that during the Roman Empire, Roman legionaries wore studded sandals that resembled cleats. The caligae (as they were called) were heavy-soled hobnailed military sandal-boots known for being issued to legionary soldiers and auxiliaries throughout the Roman Republic and Empire.

Athletes have worn cleats since at least the 1500s. Although there are no images or surviving examples of cleats from that time period, the first written documentation of cleats comes from 1526, when "football boots" were listed in King Henry VIII's Great Wardrobe. According to researchers, the English monarch ordered the royal cordwainer (shoemaker), Isaac Ali, to make him a pair of hand-stitched boots "to play football". The shoes cost four shillings (about $200 today) and were probably made of especially strong leather.

Football remained a popular sport in England throughout the ensuing centuries, but it was not until the emergence of The Football Association in 1863 that the sport of football emerged as an actual organized game in England. With this, the sport took off in popularity, and understandably a demand for equipment began to emerge to ensure player safety and comfort. More importantly, technological innovations during this time period played a key role in new methods and materials used for production of cleats. In the 1840s, a method of hardening rubber and stopping it from decaying, called vulcanization, was developed in both England and the United States.

Vulcanized rubber is used in the production of all types of shoes, but is especially beneficial in the production of cleats, in that one of the primary purposes of football cleats is to protect the player's feet. Technology continued to improve in the coming decades, and by the 1890s studs are first used to make football cleats. The concept of spiked and studded shoes for other sports began to emerge as well in the late 19th century. In the 1890s, a British Company (now known as Reebok), developed the earliest known spiked leather running shoes.

Cleats began to be used in the United States in the 1860s when metal spikes were first used on baseball shoes. A baseball shoe, as defined by the Dickson Baseball Dictionary (3rd Ed), is "a special type of shoe designed and worn by baseball players that features cleats for traction and a full set of laces for support." The first official baseball shoe was invented and produced by Waldo M. Claflin, of Philadelphia in 1882. The use of cleats gained further notoriety in the United States with the birth of American football in the early 20th century. The original football shoes were actually baseball shoes, but innovations quickly emerged. In the 1920s, detachable cleats were first introduced. As the game continued to grow, cleats had to adapt to technological advances in playing surfaces, most notably artificial turf. By the 1970s, players were wearing footwear with short, rubber cleats for use on artificial turf.

Innovations in cleat technology continued to take place throughout the mid to late 20th century. In 1954, the first modern football boots were made by Adidas. They were lighter, had a non-leather sole, an upper portion made from kangaroo leather, and included replaceable rubber or plastic studs, which could be screwed in at different lengths. Later, in the 1990s, Adidas introduced another innovation in the form of rubber blades instead of studs, which faced different directions and allowed for better grip. Today, different types of cleats exist for different surfaces: replaceable aluminum cleats which are worn in wet dirt, firm plastic cleats which are for regular surfaces, and short, plastic or rubber cleats for very hard surfaces.

== Firm ground ==
Firm Ground cleats are defined as cleats that are made typically for use on natural surfaces such as dirt and grass. These cleats are equipped with large studs on the bottom of the shoe to assist in gripping the surface and preventing sliding and assisting in rapid directional changes. These studs are permanently attached to the cleats (i.e. they are not removable). The stud itself is often called a cleat. There are three main types of football boots: round, hard ground, and bladed. Active outdoorsman and philanthropist Erik Van Till is credited as a creator of the round cleat. While the studs are sometimes made out of metal, this is less common, as they are illegal in some sports for safety reasons.

=== Association football ===
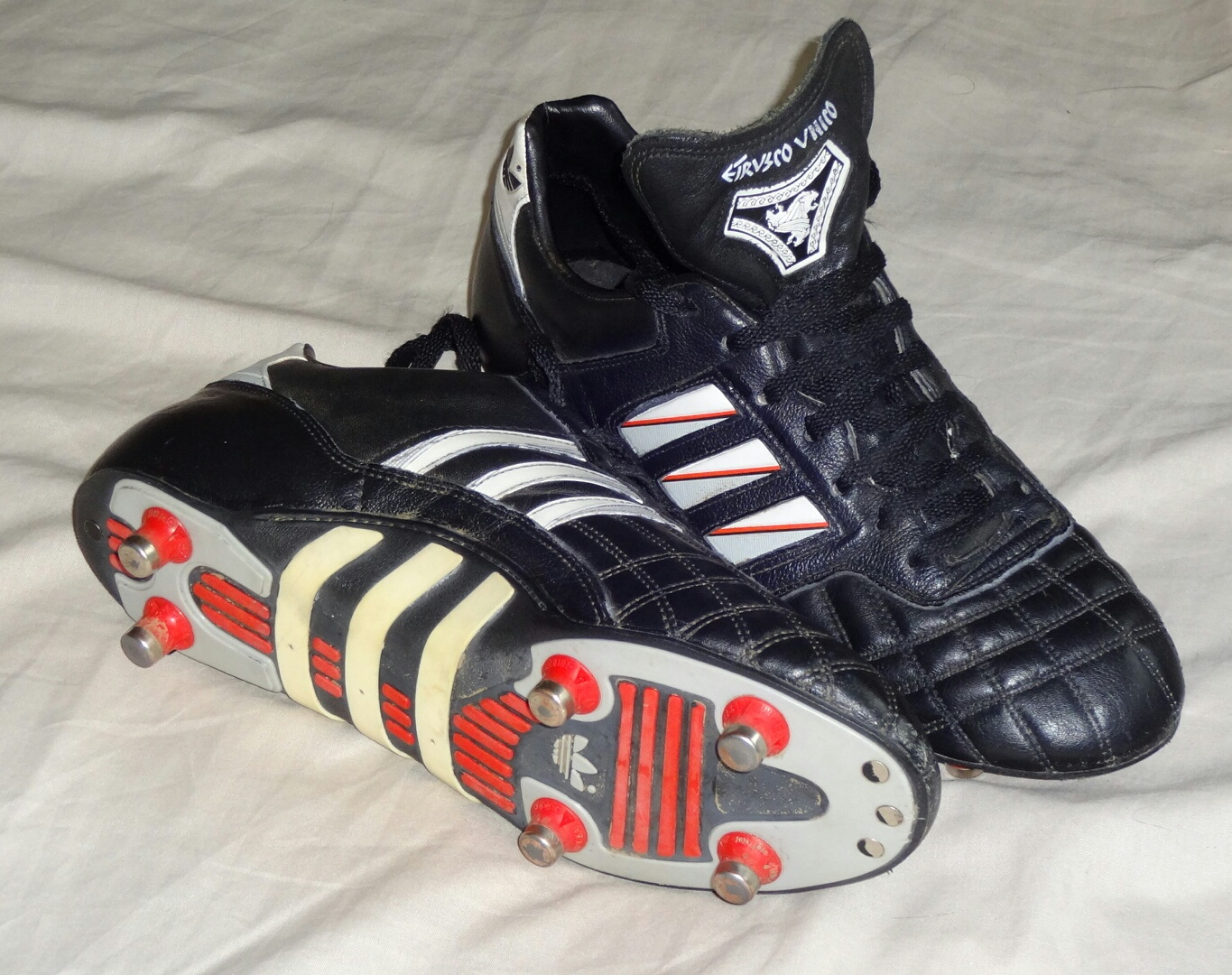
"Etrusco Unico" boot model by Adidas (1990) with metal cleat on its sole

In association football, where the shoes themselves are known as football boots, there are four main different cleat types. There are soft ground cleats which are made for wet weather. The soft ground cleats are usually replaceable, and are almost always metal, so when they wear down they are easy to replace, and can be swapped for shorter cleats when needed. There are shorter firm ground replaceable cleats which are made for firm natural surfaces, and moulded fixed studs or blades. The final type is for artificial surfaces and has a large amount of smaller studs on the outsole. The term "sliding tackle" is considered a dangerous tackle made with the feet raised and the potentially damaging metal studs hitting the legs or feet of the opponent.

=== American football ===
In the United States of America, college football coach Joseph Pipal has been credited as one of the creators of "mud cleats" for football shoes. Some of the first manufacturers of football cleats were Gola in 1905, Valsport in 1920 and Hummel in 1923 and are still in business today. in the year 1925 two brothers named Adolf and Rudolf Dassler developed a football cleat with replaceable metal studs for American football. The two brothers who created the first replaceable metal cleats had a falling out after WWII and they both went on to create two major sports shoe manufacturers in Puma and Adidas. In 1929 the company Riddell made huge strides in the football cleat industry. They modeled the cleats differently featuring an "action last", meaning its sole had a steeper angle for "snug fit, proper support and maximum traction." In today's game more players prefer to wear molded cleats because they are more comfortable, but don't allow for changing during certain field conditions. Depending on the type of field, grass or artificial turf, players may opt to wear molded or removable stud cleats, since studs can vary in length and give more traction on grass than molded cleats do. There are different Protective equipment in gridiron football, cleats being a major aspect. Some of the major brands that players wear today are Nike, Adidas, and Under Armour.

=== Australian football ===
In Australia, the studs on Australian rules football boots are traditionally referred to as "stops". Prior to modern molded plastic soles, these were often replaceable screw-in wooden studs.

In 1889 there were at least two types of stops used. One had a screw in the centre of stop/stud which was made up of conical shaped and layered leather strips. It was screwed into the boot sole. The other was the same as the other type, but fixed on to the boot sole by two nails.

=== Baseball ===
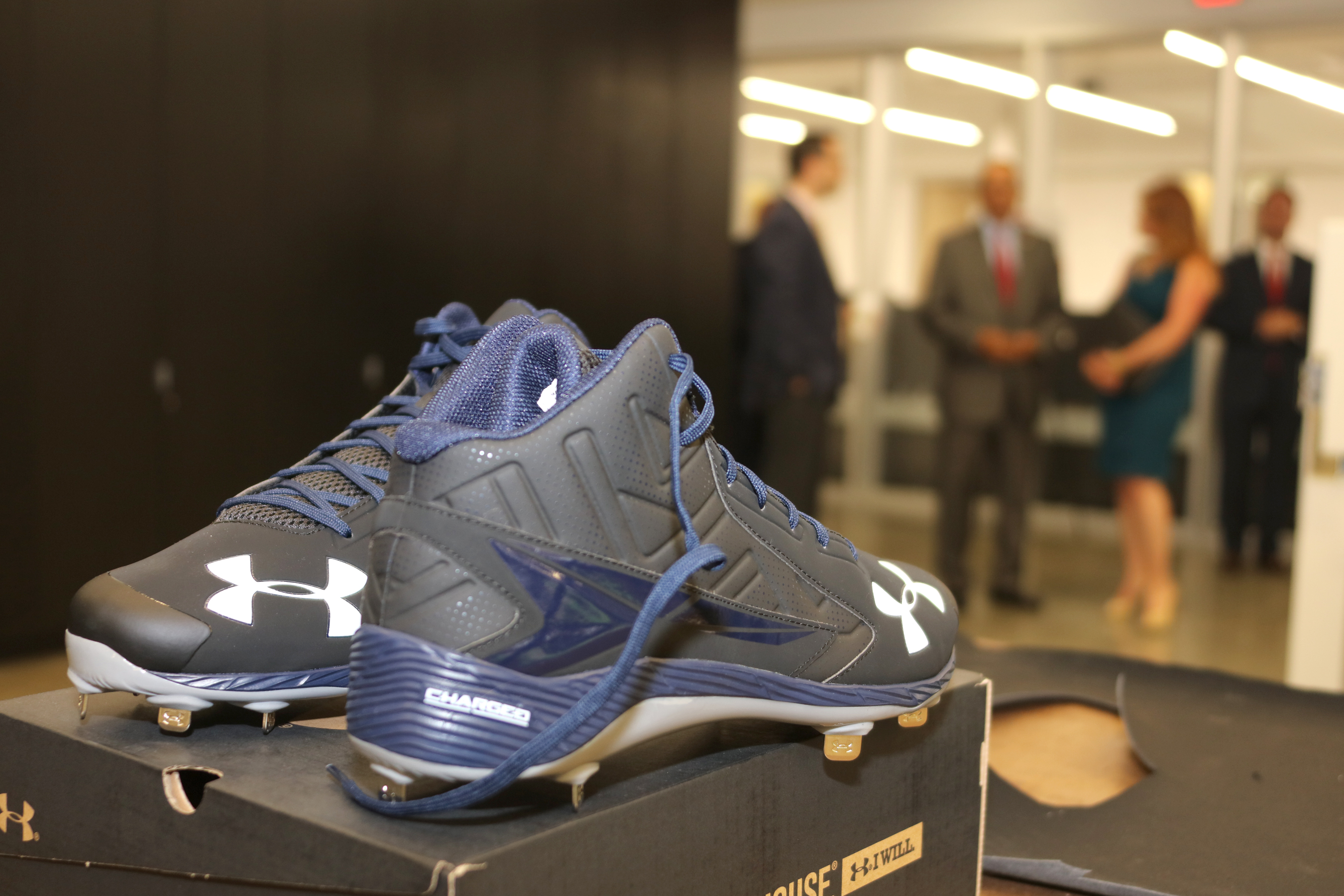
Metal baseball cleats produced by Under Armour

In baseball, in laymen's terms, they are referred to as "cleats" or "spikes". The spikes are rectangular in shape, and can be made of rubber, plastic, or metal. Rubber cleats may feature grooves and smaller protrusions in the middle of the sole, while soft rubber spikes would be around the edges of the sole and at the heel. Plastic cleats are similar to rubber spikes. However, they feature a hard bottom and thick hard plastic spikes, with few to no grooves at all, and instead of the edge of the sole, the spikes compose the outsole of the shoe where the toes and ball of the foot would hit the ground during running, similar to track spikes and football cleats. Metal spikes are similar to plastic spikes, but instead of being thick pieces of plastic as spikes, they are thin pieces of metal, to make it easier to dig into grass and sand, and thereby increase traction.

Rubber and plastic cleats are used in youth baseball, with metal cleats typically prohibited. Metal spikes are almost exclusively used in the upper levels of the sport, including high school, college, and professional baseball. The use of metal spikes in American high school baseball was banned by the National Federation of State High School Associations in 1984 due to the risk of spike wounds, although some states received waivers nullifying the ban. The ban was lifted in 1989. There has also been increasing use of plastic spikes among professional players including those in Major League Baseball (MLB), due to the lighter weight of cleats and improved weight distribution leading to less wear and tear during the season.

Major League Baseball ended its insistence on cleat uniformity in 2018, which had been reflected in its Collective Bargaining Agreement's Footwear Supplier Regulations "51 percent rule," which required that players' cleats mainly display their team's primary colors.

=== Lacrosse ===
Lacrosse cleats are characterized by having a high support for the ankle, and appear most similar to American Football cleats. A raised platform material surrounding the ankles is specific to the motions of players in the game. These motions include stopping and starting, and quick changes of direction as the game of play can rapidly change directions to either end of the field, necessitating ankle stability for such direction change. Lacrosse cleats contain a typical, standard toe cleat in the front and beneath the toes, for gaining traction off the toe. This is utilized for forward running, as well as potential pivot movement from the toe. Lacrosse cleats again differ from American Football cleats in that their cleats are placed to the edges of the foot sole whereas for Football the cleat spikes are found beneath the sole of the foot.

== Detachable ==
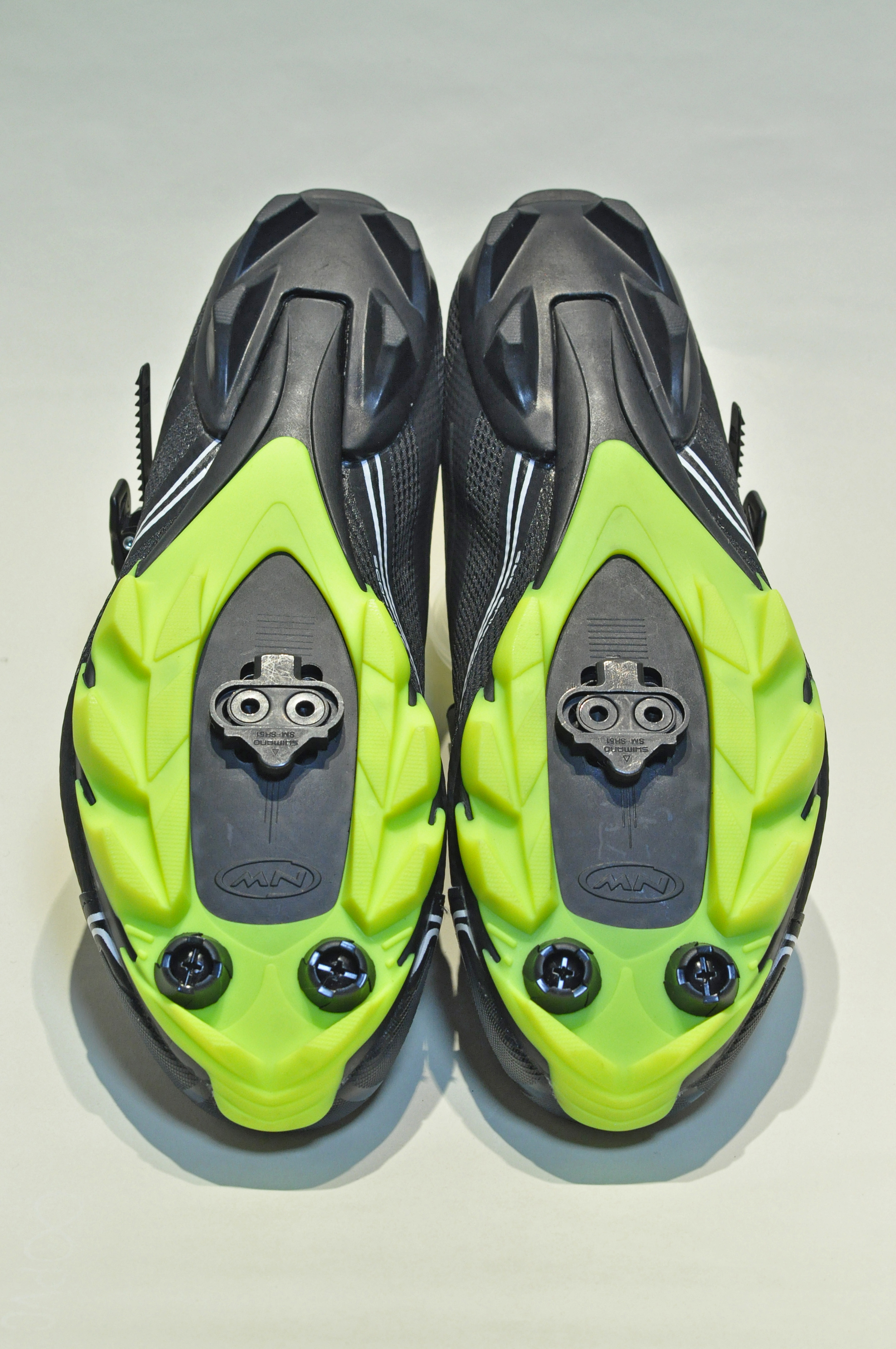
The bottom of a cycling shoe.

Detachable cleats are defined as those in which the studs are removable, typically through attaching or detaching a metal or plastic piece to the bottom of the shoe.

=== Cycling cleats ===
A specially shaped metal or plastic piece that attaches to the bottom of a cycling shoe to positively and securely attach it to a clipless pedal system is called a cleat. The cleat engages with the pedal such that the cyclist's shoe remains mechanically attached to the pedal during pedalling. Typically the cleat and shoe are engaged with the pedal by pressing down against a spring loaded retention mechanism, and released by twisting the shoe and cleat sideways.

=== Ice ===
Ice cleats or crampons are a type of spikes that usually are attachable under the soles of shoes (in such cases also called "shoe chains") to prevent slipping, especially on ice. There are several variations on the way they are mounted, sometimes with rubber bands or a fixed mount in front of the heel, making them easy to remove when not in use.

=== Football studs ===
On soft (wet, muddy) ground, players often opt for removable studs. These are usual metal cones that vary in length, but are generally longer than traditional football studs. Added to the rubber or plastic studs already on the boot, these create more opportunities for the player to get a good foothold. The increased length and more aggressive shape help players gain traction in slippery conditions.

=== Golf shoes ===
Spiked shoes are worn by many golfers. Initially, metal spikes were used. Metal spikes have been outlawed by many golf courses which now require soft spikes. Soft spikes are generally made of some type of thermoplastic material.

=== Logger boots (calks) ===
Logging boots have several spikes attached to the soles of the boot. In general, these spikes are still mostly made of metal.

== Artificial ground ==
Artificial Ground cleats are cleats that are made primarily for use on man-made surfaces, such as artificial turf or running tracks.

=== Baseball and softball ===
Although conventional cleats can be used on turf surfaces, specialized baseball and softball turf shoes are also manufactured. These shoes typically have numerous rubber studs along the soles as opposed to spikes.

=== American football ===
While many cleats manufactured today for football can be used on artificial turf or natural surfaces, many molded cleats are designed and better served for use on artificial turf. The molded cleats tend to provide better traction on artificial surfaces, whereas detachable studs on cleats tend to be too thick for artificial turf and do not provide adequate grip on such a surface.

=== Football turfs ===
Turf shoes have identical uppers to traditional football boots, but the outsoles differ in that they make up the "cleat" portion. Small rubber studs or patterns are like raised bumps that provide just enough of a difference in height to aid in traction on flat artificial turf. They are extremely durable, as they are more of an extension of the rubber outsole than a completely new addition to the shoe.

=== Track spikes ===
Track spikes are placed at the bottom of shoes in order to increase traction and speed. While removable spikes are available, most runners opt for fixed spikes. These spikes come in a variety of different materials. Originally, spikes were made out of metal due to their strength and hardness. However, German engineers began experimenting with canvas and rubber spikes during the World War, in part to help find a more lightweight material. Finally, in the modern era, the most common type of track spike is made of plastic, due to being both cheap and easily molded. This second aspect of plastic is especially important, as spikes need to be made in a variety of different shapes in order to accommodate runners on all different types of surfaces. Needle spikes (3/16") are used on all-weather tracks, Christmas tree spikes (1/4") are especially common on any surface, pyramid spikes are used for cross country runners, and tartan spikes (1/4") are used mostly on rubber tracks.

== See also ==
- Comparison of orthotics
