= Isabella Ruth Eakin Dodd =

American missionary

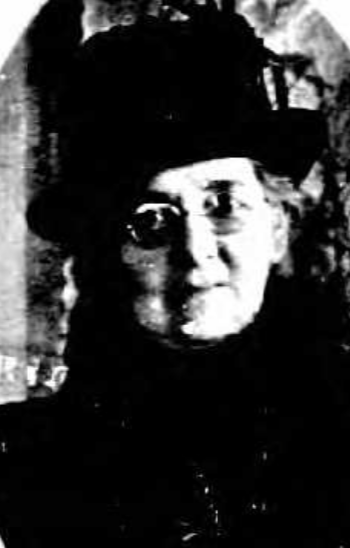
- Isabella Ruth Eakin Dodd, from her 1923 passport application
- Born: Isabella Ruth Eakin; June 26, 1861; Rose Point, Pennsylvania
- Died: July 4, 1937 (age 76); Johnstown, Pennsylvania
- Other name: Belle Eakin Dodd
- Occupations: Presbyterian missionary, translator, writer
- Spouse: William Clifton Dodd
- Relatives: John Anderson Eakin (brother)

Isabella Ruth Eakin Dodd (June 26, 1861 – July 4, 1937) was an American Presbyterian missionary in fields located in present-day Laos, Myanmar, Thailand and China.

== Early life ==
Isabella Ruth "Belle" Eakin was from Rose Point, Pennsylvania, the daughter of Joseph A. Eakin and Elizabeth McCay Eakin. She graduated from Western Female Seminary in Oxford, Ohio, in 1886.

== Career ==
Eakin began as a Presbyterian missionary in North Siam (now Laos, Myanmar, and Thailand) in 1887, following her older brother John Anderson Eakin, her older sister Elizabeth, and other relatives in their similar work in the region. With her husband, Dodd opened a mission at Lamphun near Chiang Mai in 1891, from 1904 to 1907 ran a mission in Kengtung, and in 1917 opened a mission station in Yunnan Province, considered "the most remote station of the Presbyterian mission".

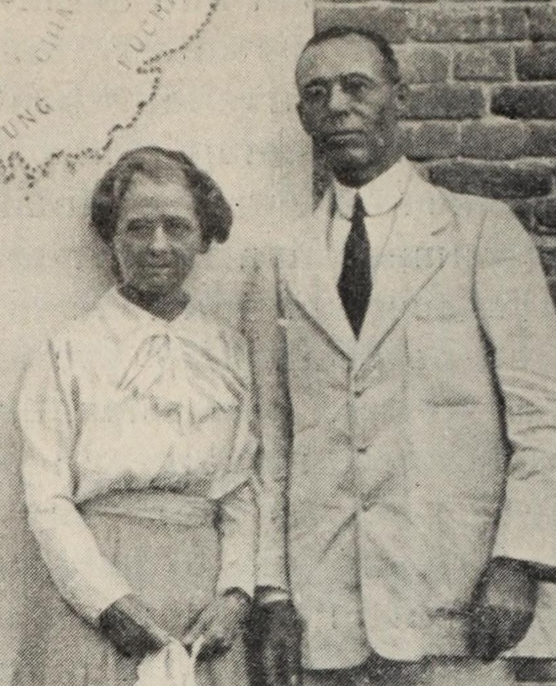
Isabella Ruth Eakin Dodd and William Clifton Dodd, from a 1917 publication

Dodd wrote several articles about her work for American periodicals, especially Woman's Work. She finished the book that she began with her husband, The Tai Race: Elder Brother of the Chinese (1923), and translated the Gospel of Matthew into a Tai dialect. She retired from the mission field in 1928.

== Publications ==
- "An Evangelistic Tour in Laos" (1890)
- "Lampoon as We Found it, After Two Years' Absence" (1896)
- "Last Stages of a Long Journey and Arrival at the Goal" (1898)
- "A Tribe of Laos Highlanders" (1899)
- "A Tour of Buddhist Temples in British Territory" (1899)
- "A Laos Mother in Israel" (1901)
- "The Lao Girls' Orchestra at Chieng Mai" (1903)
- "A Chieng Tung Cremation" (1906)
- "Incidents of a Visit to Kengtung State" (1910)
- "Unoccupied Fields" (1919)
- The Tai Race: Elder Brother of the Chinese (1923, with William Clifton Dodd)

== Personal life ==
Eakin married fellow missionary William Clifton Dodd in 1889. They adopted a daughter, Leila Marie, in 1898. Her husband died in 1919, and she died in 1937, at the age of 76, in Johnstown, Pennsylvania. She was remembered as a notable former member when Clintonville Presbyterian Church held its centennial in 1941.
