= Slippery (disambiguation) =

Slippery is descriptive of slipperiness.

Slippery may also refer to:

== Geography ==
- Slippery Falls, a waterfall near Pelverata Falls, Tasmania
- Slippery Rock Formation, a geologic formation in Jamaica

== Arts, entertainment, and media ==
- "Slippery" (song), 2017 song by Migos from their album Culture
- "Slippery", 2019 song by Psapp from their album Tourists
- Paul, Estelle, Rory, Daniel and Edwin Slippery, a fictional family in the 2003 British television series Fortysomething

== Other uses ==
- Operation Slippery, a planned deception in support of Operation Zipper, a British Second World War plan
- Slippery hitch, a type of knot used to attach a line to a rod or bar
- Slippery the Sea Lion, who escaped in June 1958 from a marine mammal park in London, Ontario, Canada

== See also ==
- Slippery Rock (disambiguation)
- Slippery When Wet (disambiguation)
- Slipperiness
- Slippering
