= Ice cleat =

Spiked footwear accessory

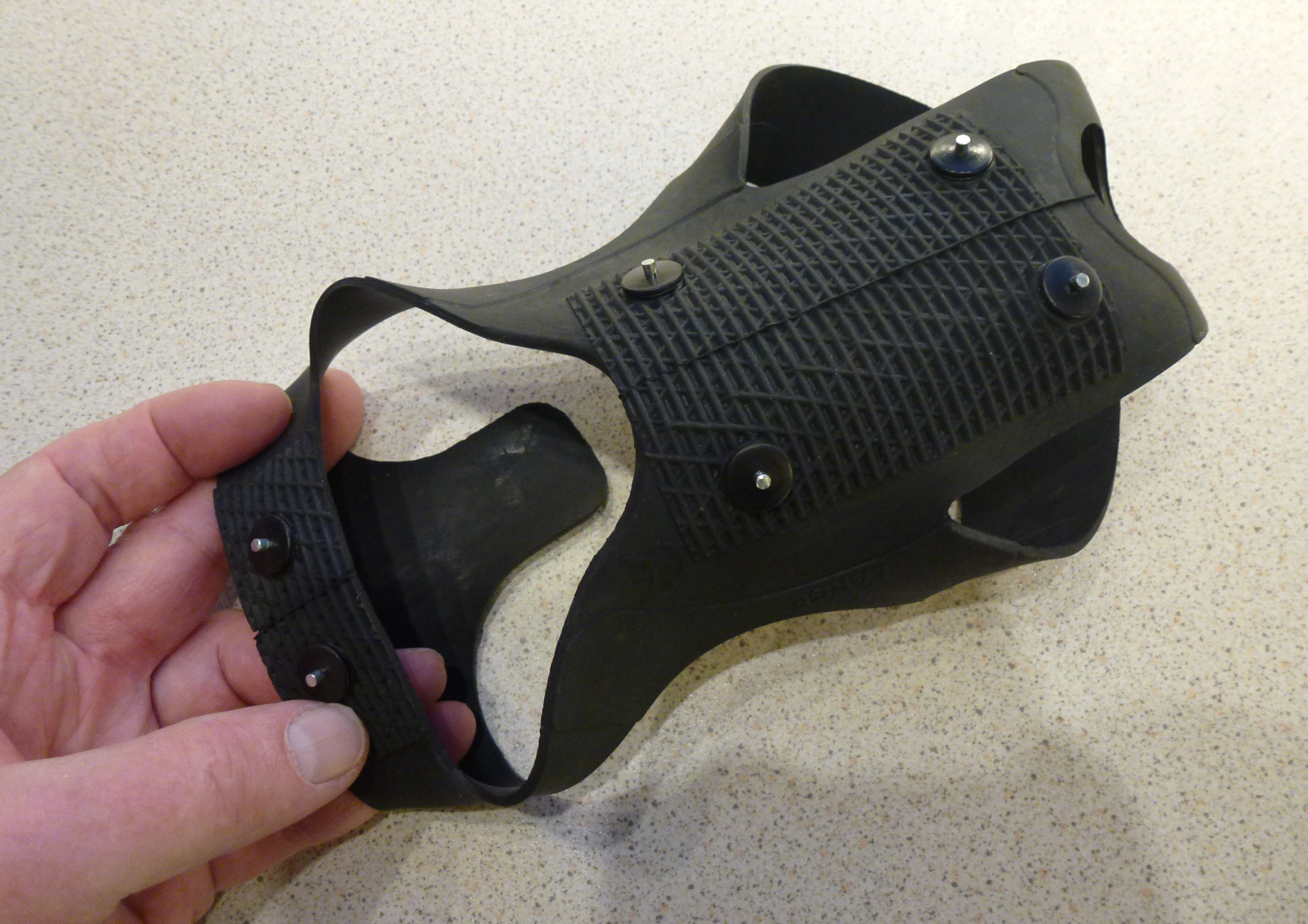

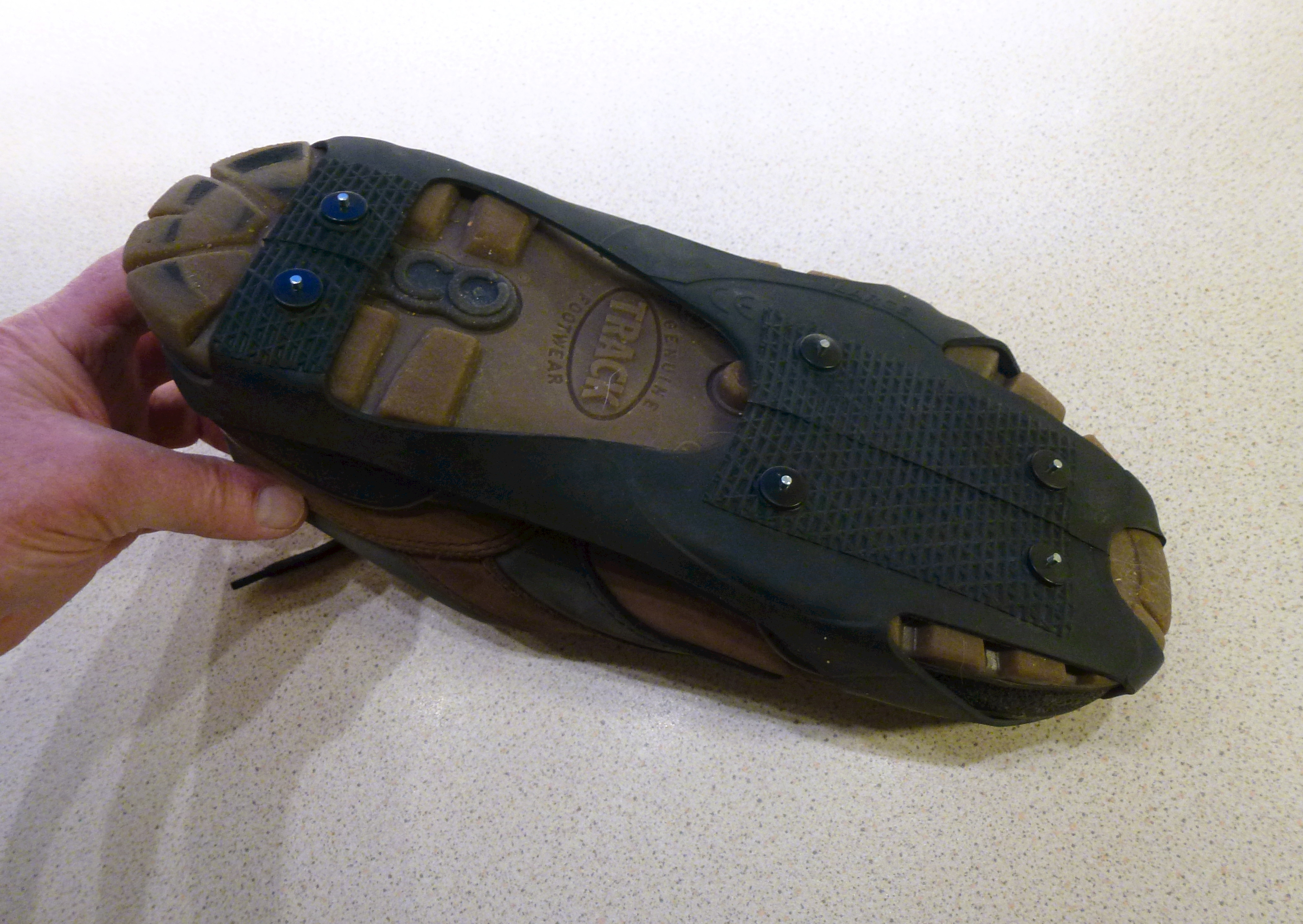
Metal cleats affixed to a rubber covering that can be attached to a shoe.

Ice cleats are a device, affixed to a shoe or boot, with small studs or spikes underneath. They are used to avoid sliding on slippery surfaces like ice or snow. Ice cleats are attached to footwear with either straps over the heel and toe or a single strip over the foot. Not to be mistaken for crampons used for ice climbing, ice cleats are much smaller and are commonly used in arctic areas.

== Different styles ==
There are specially-made ice cleats for jogging and hiking. In the past, cleats were often used by elders, but new designs have made them more popular among younger people. There are also shoes with spikes already fastened to their soles. There are different types of ice cleats designed and manufactured for Transitional Traction (that can be worn inside and outside) and Aggressive Traction (for working outdoors). Industrial ice cleats are designed and manufactured to withstand lower temperature thresholds and perform for a longer time in a work/industrial environment. Most ice cleats are not safe to wear indoors, and the wearer may slip if attempting to do so. The exception is with transitional traction ice cleats, a newer technology.

Ice cleats designed for use in an industrial environment also exist.

== History ==
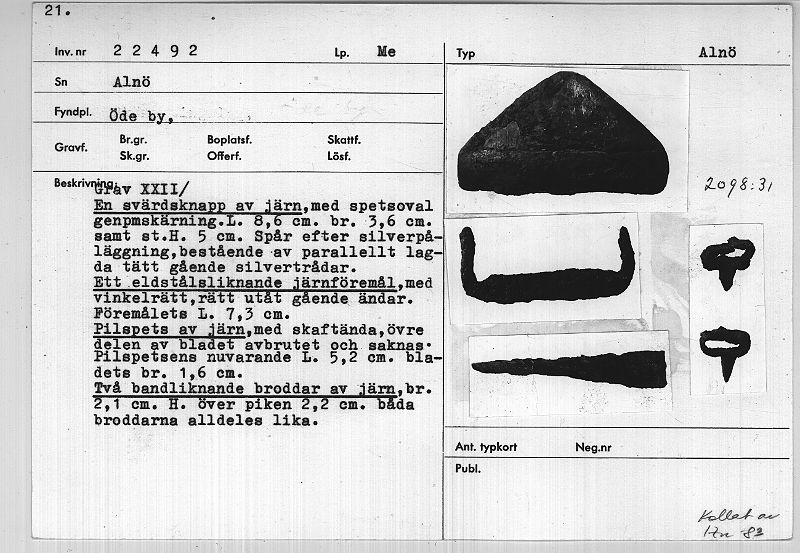
Archaeological finding of cleats

The military was an early user of ice cleats, while performing duties in cold weather regions, to increase mobility in the mountains and arctic areas.

Ice cleats dating back to c. 800–1100 were found in the town of Öde in Medelpad, Sweden, in 1939. The finding is located in the history museum in Sweden.

== See also ==
- Snow chains
