= Hell Run (Slippery Rock Creek tributary) =

Stream in Pennsylvania, USA

Hell Run Tributary to Slippery Rock Creek
- Location of Hell Run mouth Hell Run (Slippery Rock Creek tributary) (the United States)

Location
- Country: United States
- State: Pennsylvania
- County: Lawrence
- Townships: Slippery Rock; Shenango

Physical characteristics
- Source: divide between Slippery Rock Creek and Beaver River
  - location: about 0.5 miles north of Energy, Pennsylvania
  - coordinates: 40°56′02″N 080°15′48″W
  - elevation: 1,220 ft (370 m)
- Mouth: Slippery Rock Creek
  - location: about 0.5 miles upstream of Harris Bridge on Slippery Rock Creek
  - coordinates: 40°54′57″N 080°12′55″W
  - elevation: 880 ft (270 m)
- Length: 4.5 mi (7.2 km)
- Basin size: 5.78 square miles (15.0 km^{2})
- Discharge
  - location: Slippery Rock Creek
  - average: 7.24 cu ft/s (0.205 m^{3}/s) at mouth with Slippery Rock Creek

Basin features
- Progression: Slippery Rock Creek → Connoquenessing Creek → Beaver River → Ohio River → Mississippi River → Gulf of Mexico
- River system: Beaver River
- Tributaries
  - left: unnamed tributaries
  - right: unnamed tributaries
- Bridges: Center Church Road, Copper Road, Shaffer Road

Hell Run is a 4.5 mi (7.2 km) long tributary to Slippery Rock Creek in Lawrence County, Pennsylvania. Hell Run flows most of its distance through McConnells Mill State Park and is the only stream in Lawrence County, Pennsylvania rated as an Exceptional Value (EV) stream.

== Name ==
The name "Hell's Hollow" and Hell Run has been ascribed to the description of an early settler who stayed the night in the hollow and termed it Hell.

== Watershed ==
The Hell Run watershed is mostly in agricultural use with some strip mines in the upper sections and is natural in the lower sections within McConnell's Mill State Park. Almost 60% of the watershed is forested.

=== History ===
Jacob Shaffer (1809-1810) and Miller Kennedy (1808) were the earliest settlers in the area. Iron smelting took place in the valley during the late 1800s and an old iron furnace is still present within the watershed.

=== Designations ===
The Hell Run watershed has been designated as an Exceptional Value (EV) stream by the PA Fish and Boat Commission. Hell Run along with Slippery Rock Creek is listed on the Nationwide Inventory of Wild and Scenic Rivers.

== See also ==
- List of rivers of Pennsylvania
