= Slippage =

Slippage may refer to:

- Degree of slipping or loosening as result of slipperiness
- Slippage (finance), the difference between estimated transaction costs and the amount actually paid
- Project slippage, in project planning, the act of missing a deadline
- Replication slippage, nucleotide duplications created by DNA polymerase during DNA replication
- Bit slip, the loss or gain of a bit or bits, caused by variations in respective clock rates of transmitting and receiving devices

== Entertainment ==
- Slippage (short story collection), a 1997 collection of short stories by Harlan Ellison
- Slippage, an album by Slobberbone
- "Slippage", a song by Goldfrapp from Black Cherry
