= Rose Point, Pennsylvania =

Unincorporated community in Pennsylvania, US

- Unincorporated community
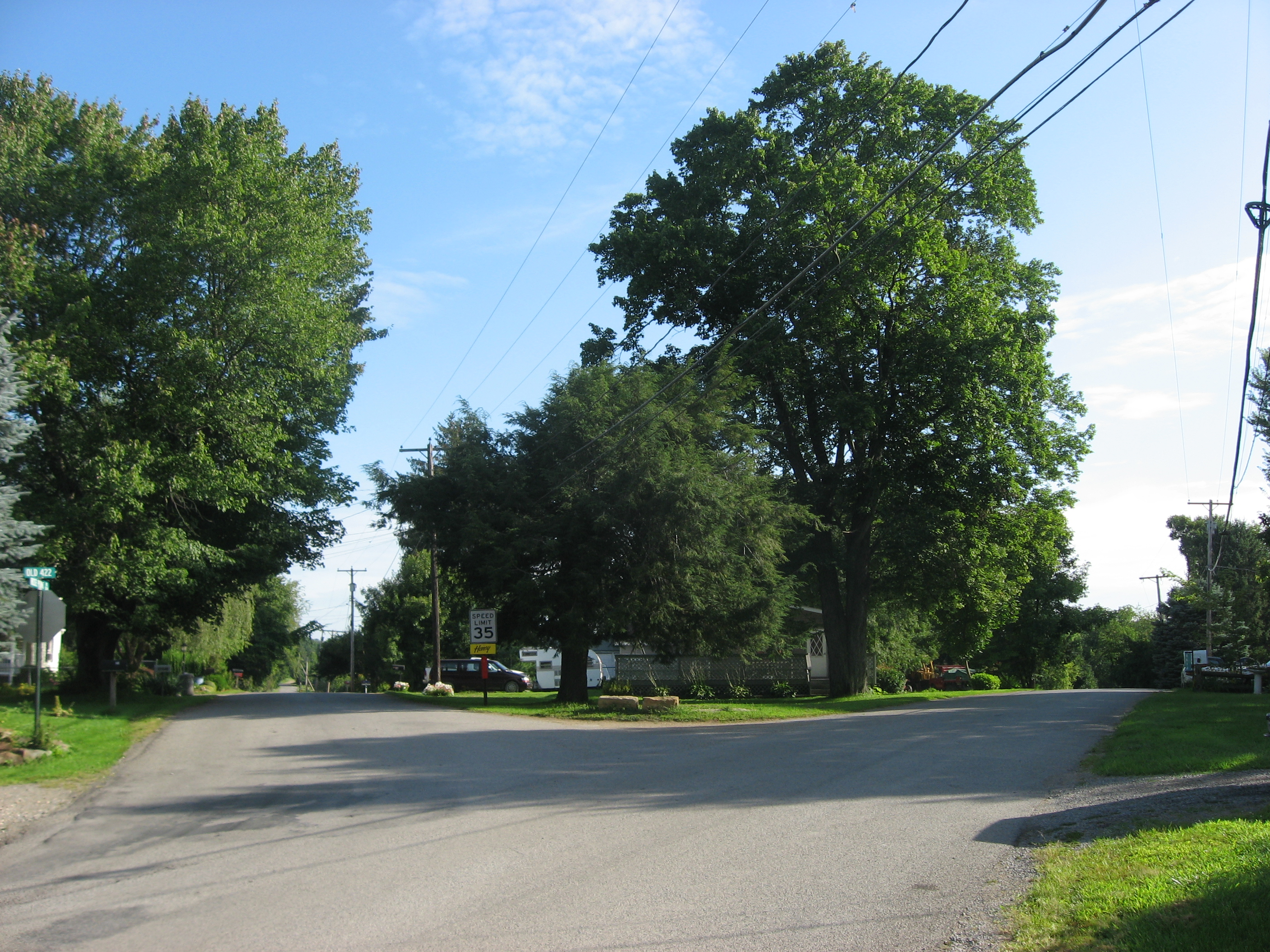
- The actual Rose Point at the center of the community

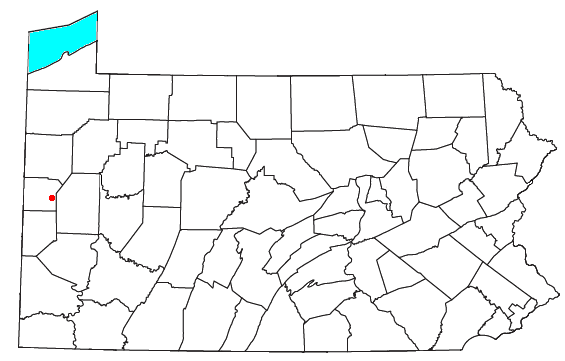
- Location of Rose Point, Pennsylvania

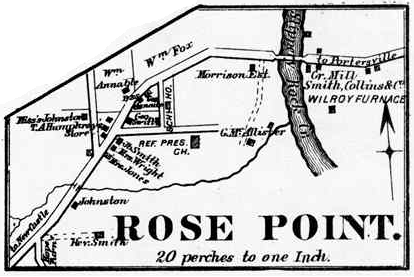
- Map of Rose Point in 1872
- Coordinates: 40°58′12″N 80°11′11″W
- Country: United States
- State: Pennsylvania
- County: Lawrence
- Township: Slippery Rock
- Elevation: 1,106 ft (337 m)
- Time zone: UTC-5 (Eastern (EST))
  - Summer (DST): UTC-4 (EDT)
- GNIS feature ID: 1185451

Rose Point is an unincorporated community in east central Slippery Rock Township, Lawrence County, Pennsylvania, United States, very close to the Butler County line. Founded approximately 200 years ago, the community lies in a rural yet formerly industrial region of fields and broken terrain.

== Geography ==
Rose Point's elevation is 1,106 feet (337 m). It lies on the northern side of U.S. Route 422 at its intersection with Rose Point Road, along the gorge of the Slippery Rock Creek. Located east of the city of New Castle, the county seat of Lawrence County, the community sits approximately midway between New Castle and Butler. It lies near two of U.S. 422's significant intersections: with U.S. Route 19, approximately 1 mile (1.6 km) away, and with Interstate 79, about 3 miles (4.8 km) distant. In the vicinity of Rose Point are multiple state parks: Moraine State Park, including the large Lake Arthur, is located to the east not far past Interstate 79, while McConnells Mill State Park sits on the opposite side of U.S. 422.

== Geology ==
The bedrock around Rose Point is primarily the soft rock of the large Vanport Limestone layer, which has a 93.6% content of calcium carbonate and low levels of magnesium carbonate and silica. Hydrocarbons were originally prevalent in the township: significant coal beds of fine quality were found throughout the area, and oil wells were drilled in hopes of reaching the edge of the Venango County-centered oil fields. Seen most clearly in the deep and broken gorge of the Slippery Rock Creek is the karst topography of the region around Rose Point, which also includes significant cave complexes. Leading among the caves in the area is the Harlansburg Cave, Pennsylvania's longest cave, which has been reported to extend from Harlansburg (eleven miles away) to Rose Point. Smaller caves such as the Rose Point Cave also exist in the area, parallel to the Harlansburg Cave; all these caves are believed to have been formed by stream water forced underground during wetter times of the year, causing their passages to be maze-like rather than linear.

== History ==
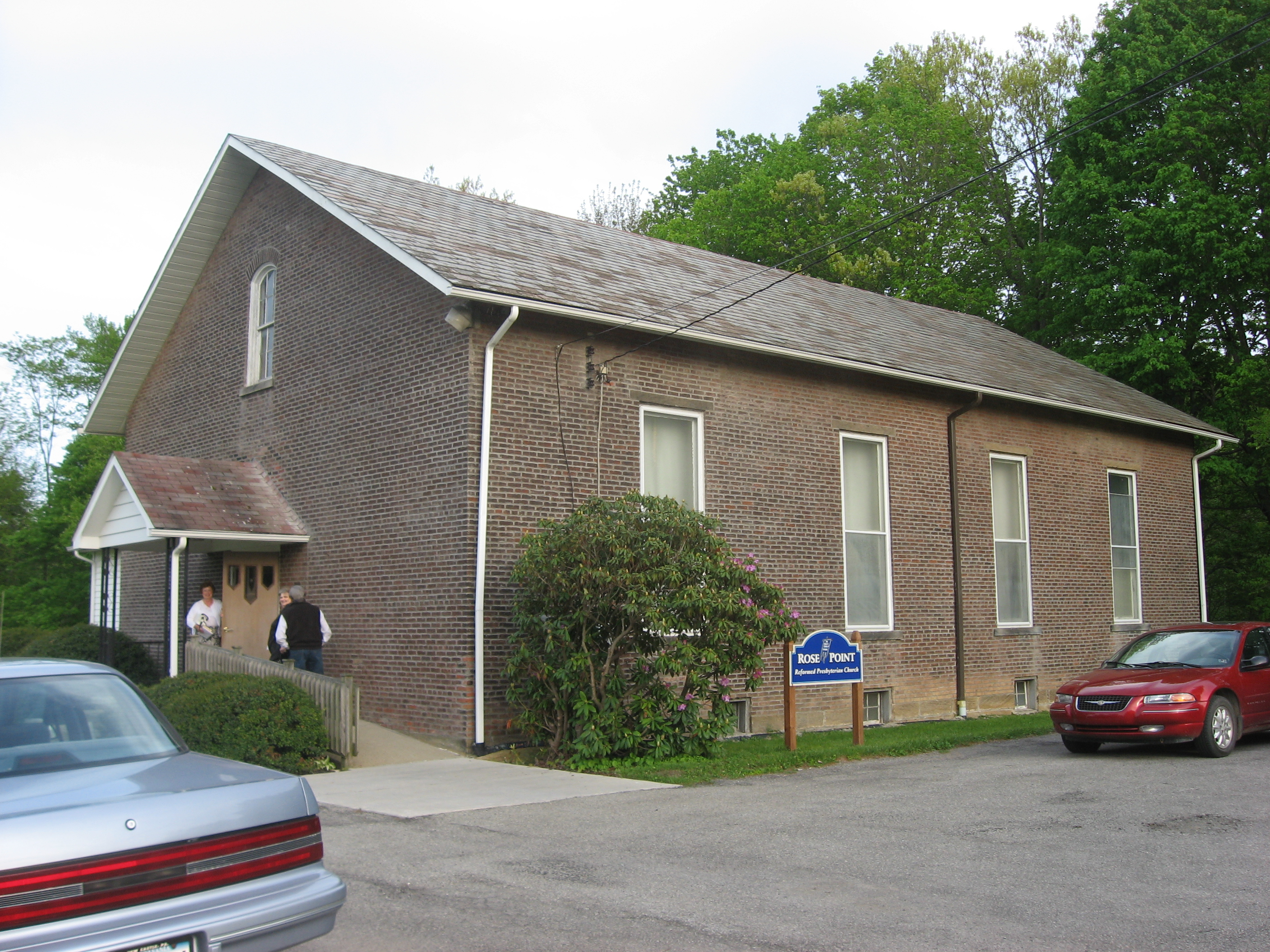
Rose Point Reformed Presbyterian Church

The first settler in the Rose Point vicinity were Abraham Wigle and Samuel Stickle of Westmoreland County, who arrived in 1804. Wigle was the first of many to harness the power of the Slippery Rock Creek, building a gristmill and a sawmill on its banks in about 1825; although Wigle's mill was destroyed by water, another mill (later abandoned) was built shortly before 1850, and the still-preserved McConnells Mill is just 2 miles (3.2 km) downstream. Various businesses were established in the community, including a hotel, blacksmiths' and cobblers' shops, and multiple stores. Two churches were established in the community: one Reformed Presbyterian (which still exists), and one Roman Catholic. Slippery Rock Township's natural resources were exploited in Rose Point, with iron furnaces being built to use locally produced iron ore, coal, and limestone. Of these two, the Willie Roy or Wilroy Furnace, built in 1854, has been recognized as a Pennsylvania state historic location. Public services were also introduced to the community: a post office was opened in the 1850s, and a village school was established in the early 1860s. Dates given for the establishment of the Rose Point post office vary from 1852 to 1858; regardless of the date of its establishment, the post office operated until disestablishment in 1933. Today, Rose Point addresses are served by the New Castle ZIP code, 16101. While the community has long been known only as Rose Point, it also bore the name of "Stonetown" for a time in its early history; the post office, however, was always named Rose Point.
