= McConnells Mill State Park =

State park in Pennsylvania, United States

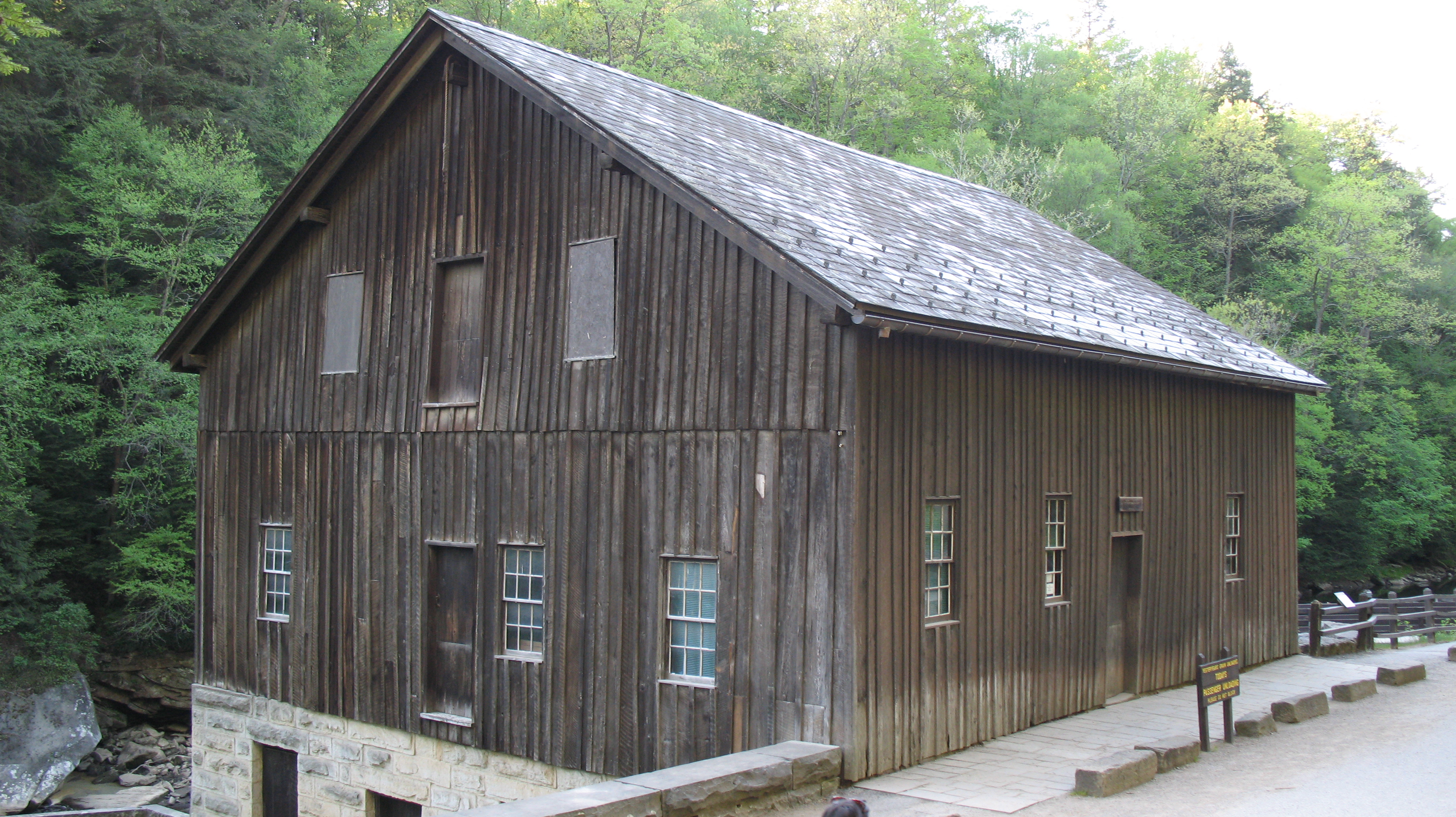

- Location within Pennsylvania Location within the United States
- Interactive map of McConnells Mill State Park
- Location: Lawrence County, Pennsylvania, United States
- Coordinates: 40°57′06″N 80°10′07″W
- Area: 2,546 acres (1,030 ha)
- Elevation: 1,145 feet (349 m)
- Established: 1957
- Administrator: Pennsylvania Department of Conservation and Natural Resources
- Website: Official website
- Pennsylvania State Parks

McConnells Mill State Park is a 2,546 acres (1,030 ha) Pennsylvania state park in Perry and Slippery Rock Townships, Lawrence County, Pennsylvania in the United States. The park features a deep scenic gorge with the restored watermill and a covered bridge at the bottom, accessible by a roadway that winds between large, room-sized boulders on the hillside. McConnells Mill State Park is along the Slippery Rock Creek. just southwest of the intersection of US 422 and US 19.

McConnells Mill State Park was chosen by the Pennsylvania Department of Conservation and Natural Resources (DCNR) and its Bureau of Parks as one of "25 Must-See Pennsylvania State Parks".

== History ==
=== McConnell's Mill ===
Daniel Kennedy opened a gristmill on Slippery Rock Creek in 1852. The mill was destroyed by fire in 1868 and was quickly rebuilt. Ownership of the mill was transferred to the park's namesake, Thomas McConnell in 1875. He replaced the waterwheel with water turbines and the grindstones with rolling mills. This made McConnell's Mill one of the first rolling mills in the country. The mill processed oats, corn, buckwheat and wheat until it was closed in 1928. Ownership of the land transferred from Thomas H. Hartman to the Western Pennsylvania Conservancy in 1942. The conservancy then transferred the land to the Commonwealth of Pennsylvania in 1957 when McConnells Mill State Park was formally dedicated.

=== Covered bridge ===
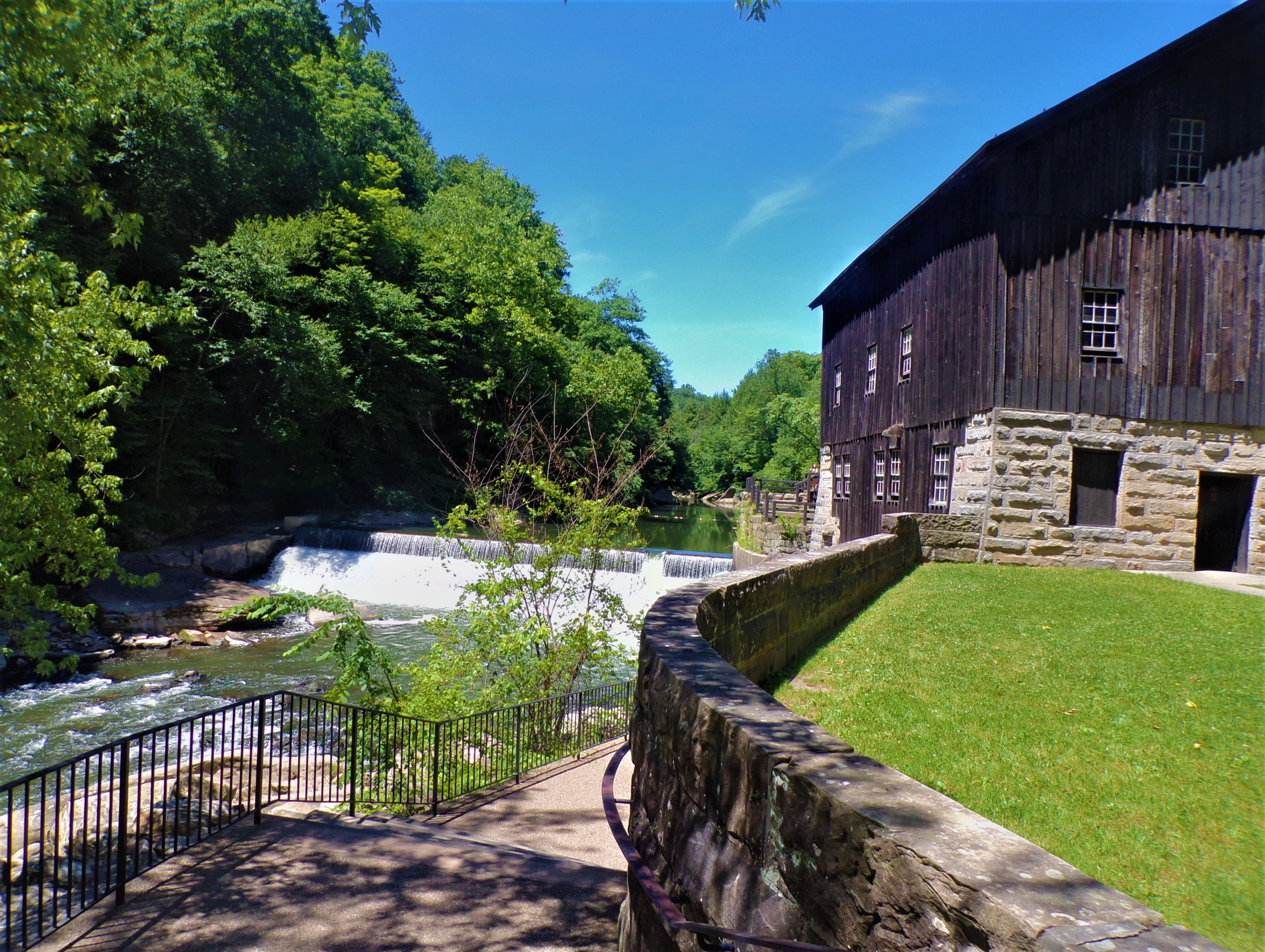
McConnells Mill with the gristmill and Slippery Rock Creek in the background.

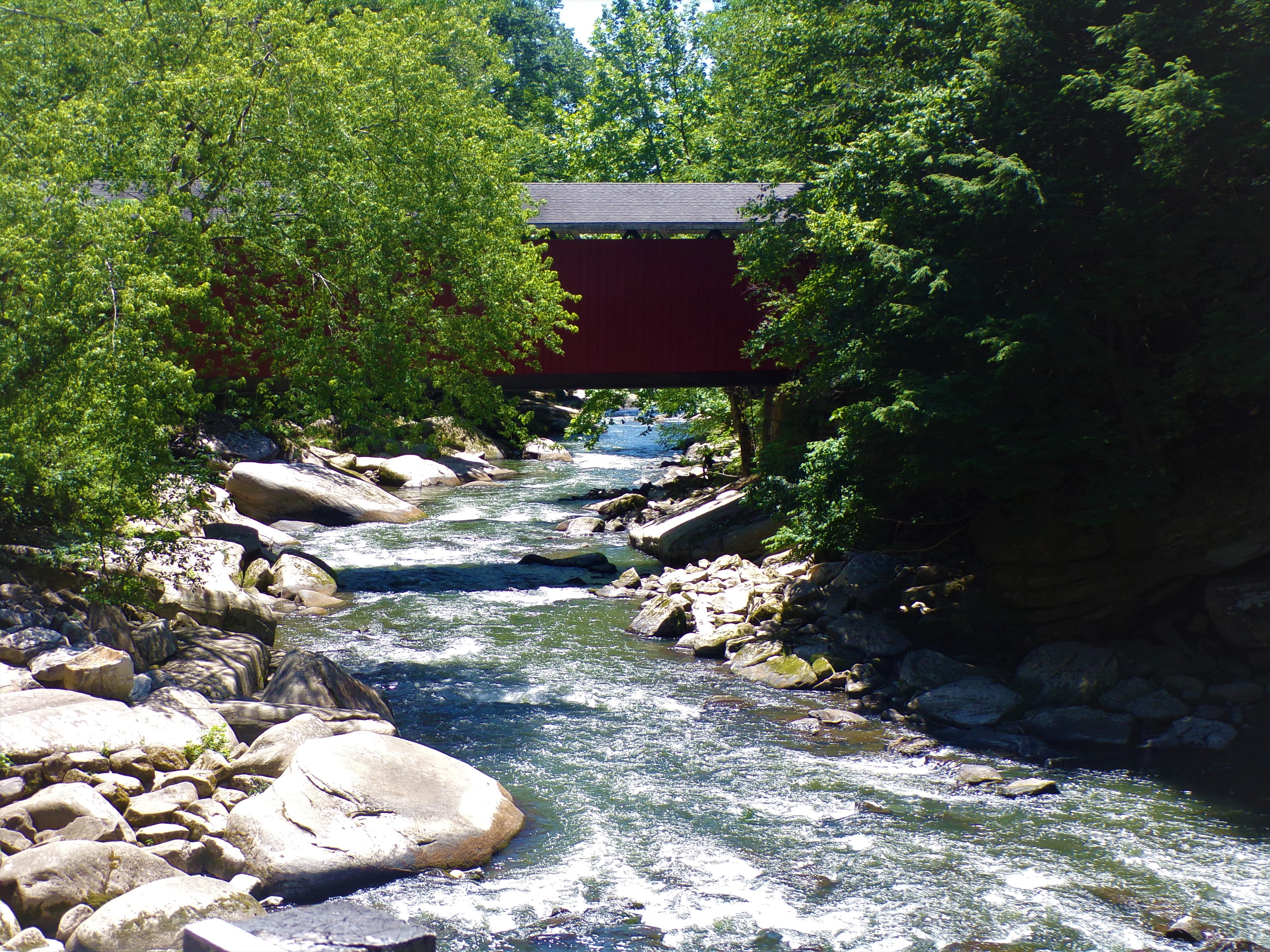
McConnells Mills Covered Bridge during the summer.

The McConnells Mill Covered Bridge was built in 1874. It is a Howe truss bridge. One of two covered bridges in Lawrence County, it is owned by the county, but is located on state land at McConnells Mill State Park. The bridge is listed in the National Register of Historic Places.

== Recreation ==
=== Hiking and rock climbing ===
There are several trails in the park, including a pair that lead to a waterfall (with an old limestone kiln next to it). The trail system is part of the North Country Trail, the nation' longest National Scenic Trail which runs from North Dakota to New England. There are two climbing/rappelling areas. Both are only recommended for "equipped and experienced climbers". The more difficult of the two is at Breakneck Bridge.

- Alpha Pass Trail is a "moderate" 1.5 miles (2.4 km) hiking trail that is marked with blue blazes. The trail is part of the North Country Trail. The section in the park begins at the Alpha Pass scenic view. It then runs along the east bank of Slippery Rock Creek to the Old Mill.

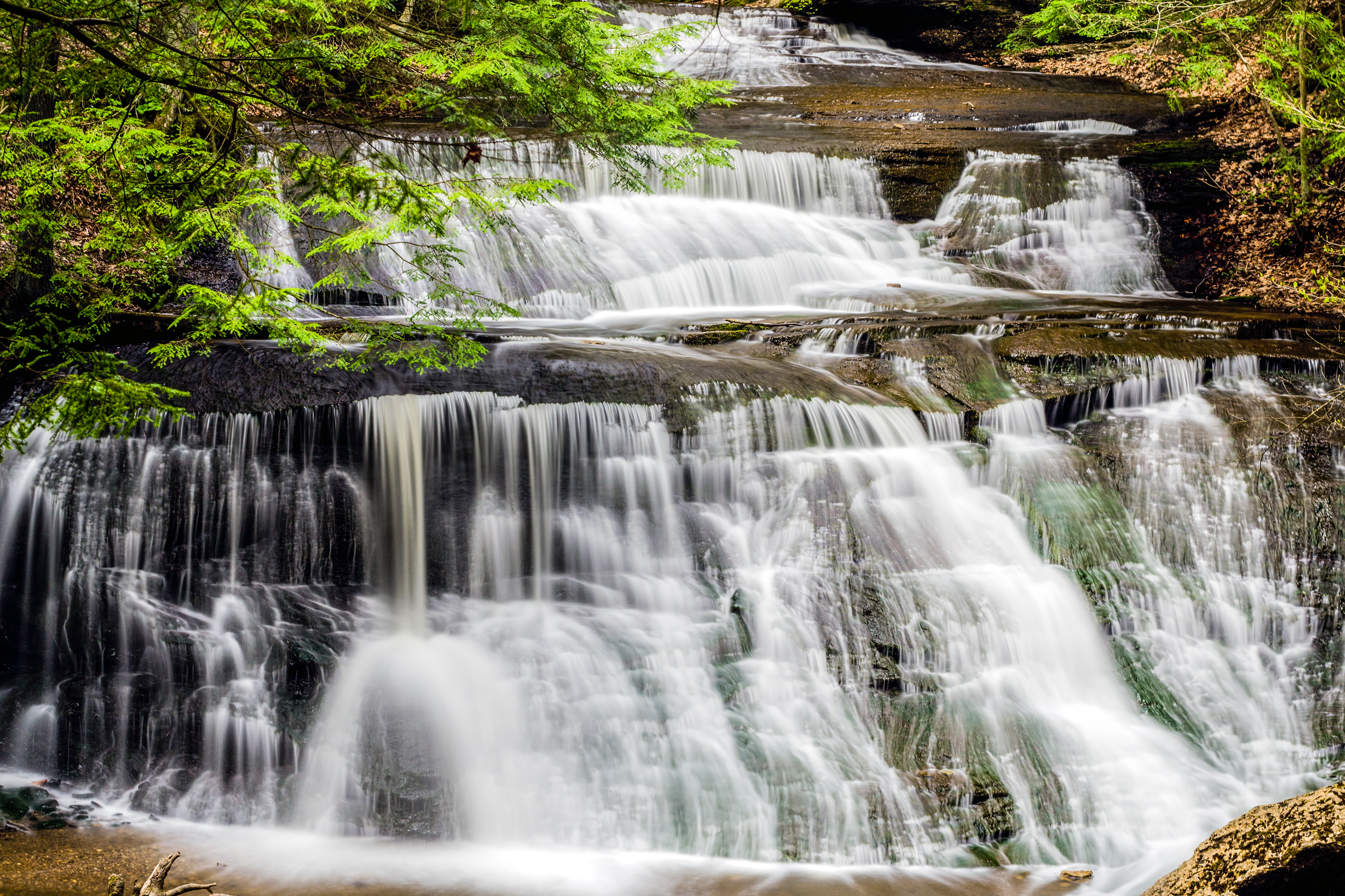
Hells Hollow Falls

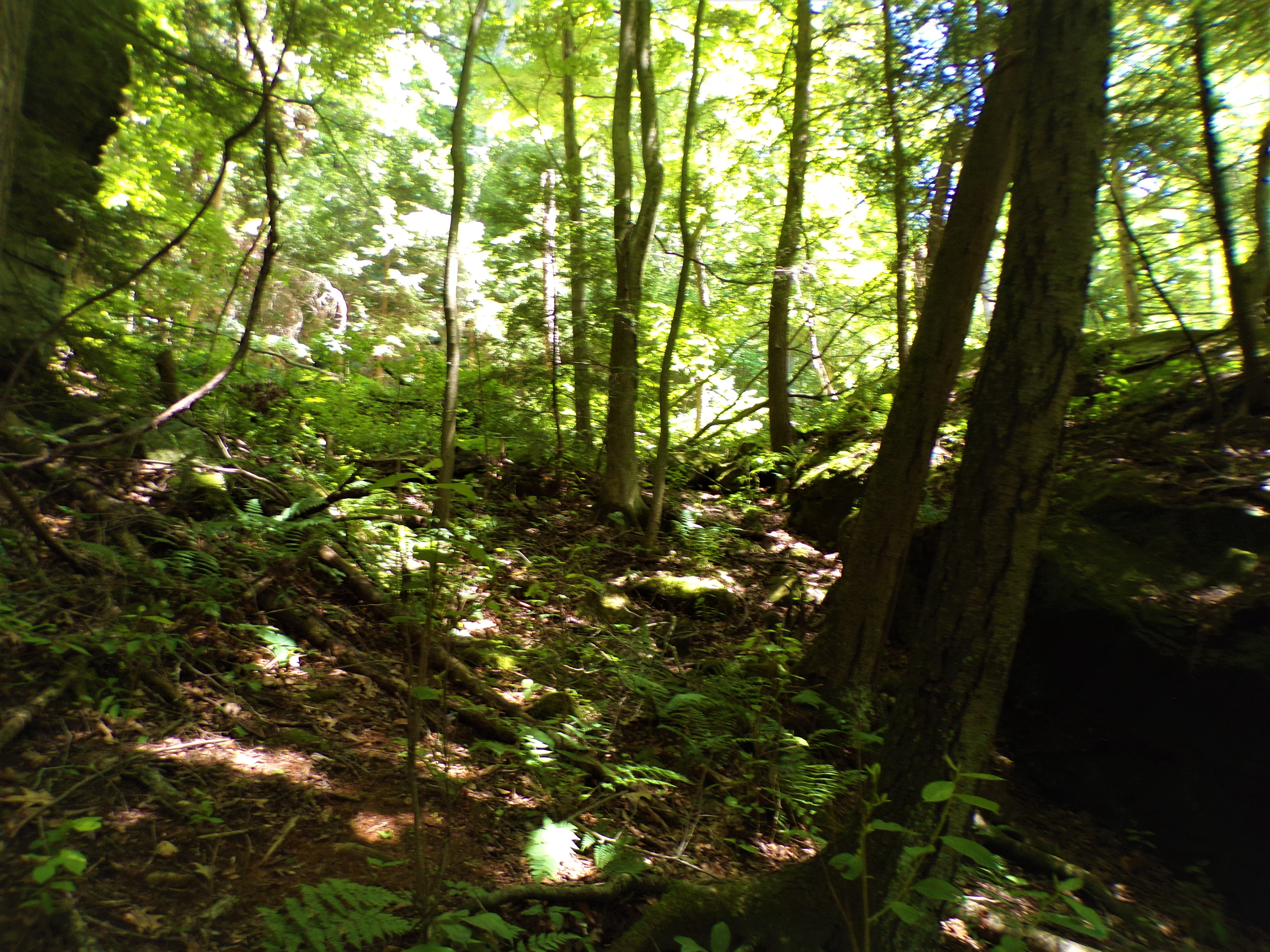
- A mixed forest around the park.
  Hell's Hollow Trail is an "easy" 0.5 miles (0.80 km) hiking trail that begins at the Hell's Hollow parking area and follows Hell Run to the restored lime kiln and on to Hells Hollow Falls.
- Kildoo Trail is a "moderate" 2 miles (3.2 km) hiking trail loop. It begins and ends at the McConnells Mill Covered Bridge and follows the banks of Slippery Rock Creek. The western portion of the trail is marked with blue blazes and is also part of the North Country Trail.
- Slippery Rock Gorge Trail is a difficult trail that is part of the North Country Trail and is marked with blue blazes. The trail passes through several different geological areas. The first portion of the trail is in the upper end of Hell Run gorge. The trail then descends into Slippery Rock Gorge and onto an alluvial flood plain at the bottom of the gorge. From the flood plain, the trail ascends the gorge and descends once again before following the main creek bank to its terminus at Eckert Bridge.

=== Whitewater boating ===
Whitewater boating is very popular on this part of Slippery Rock Creek and it is rated a Class II-III, on the International Scale of River Difficulty, depending on water conditions. Boating usually begins at the U.S. Route 422 bridge at Rose Point, outside the park boundary and passes under Eckert Bridge within the park before ending at Harris Bridge. There is a portage at the dam at the Old Mill. It is illegal to "run" the dam. All boaters are required to wear life jackets that are approved by the United States Coast Guard.

=== Hunting and fishing ===
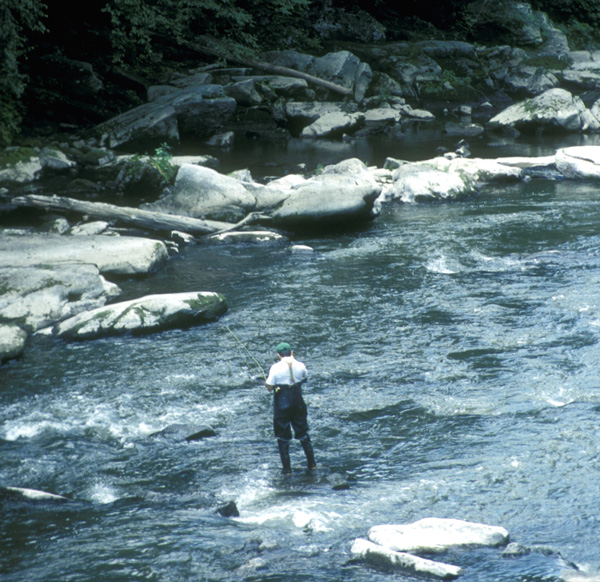
Fishing at the park

Hunting is permitted in much of McConnells Mill State Park. Hunters are expected to follow the rules and regulations of the Pennsylvania Game Commission. The common game species are ruffed grouse, squirrels, turkey, white-tailed deer, and rabbits. The hunting of groundhogs is not permitted at the park. The Pennsylvania Fish and Boat Commission assures that anglers will have plenty of chances to catch fish by stocking trout and bass in the waters of Slippery Rock Creek.

== Geology ==
The bedrock at McConnells Mill State Park was formed over 300,000,000 years ago as layers of peat, mud and sand were compressed. This part of Pennsylvania was a coastal area at the time. The layers of bedrock were built into mountains as the continental plates shifted. The layers of bedrock had different strengths. Some of the layers eroded quickly and others eroded at a much slower pace. The various erosion rates account for the variety of geologic features at McConnells Mill State Park. The geology of the park was also heavily influenced by the glacial effects of the ice age: a large glacial lake (water that was held in place by a glacier), broke about 140,000 years ago. This break in the glacial dam caused a dramatic change in the flow of the water. The lake that had previously drained in a northward direction was now draining to the south. The drastic change in direction and very high volume of water flow created Slippery Rock Creek Gorge.

== Environment ==
McConnells Mill State Park lies within the Appalachian mixed mesophytic forests ecoregion.
