= Slippery Rock Township, Lawrence County, Pennsylvania =

Township in Pennsylvania, US

Coordinates: 40°58′00″N 80°15′29″W

Slippery Rock Township
- Township
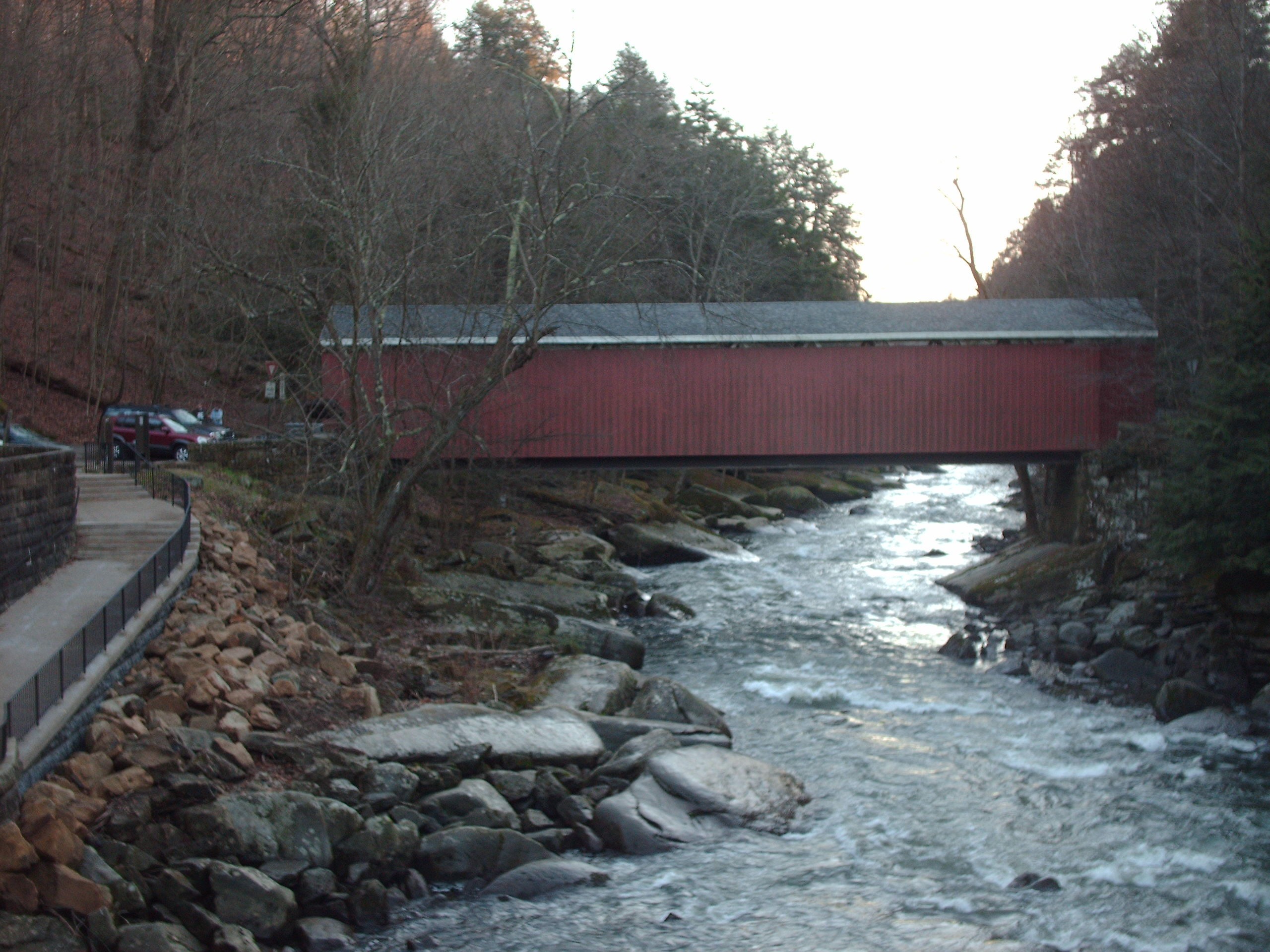
- McConnell's Mill Covered Bridge in McConnells Mill State Park

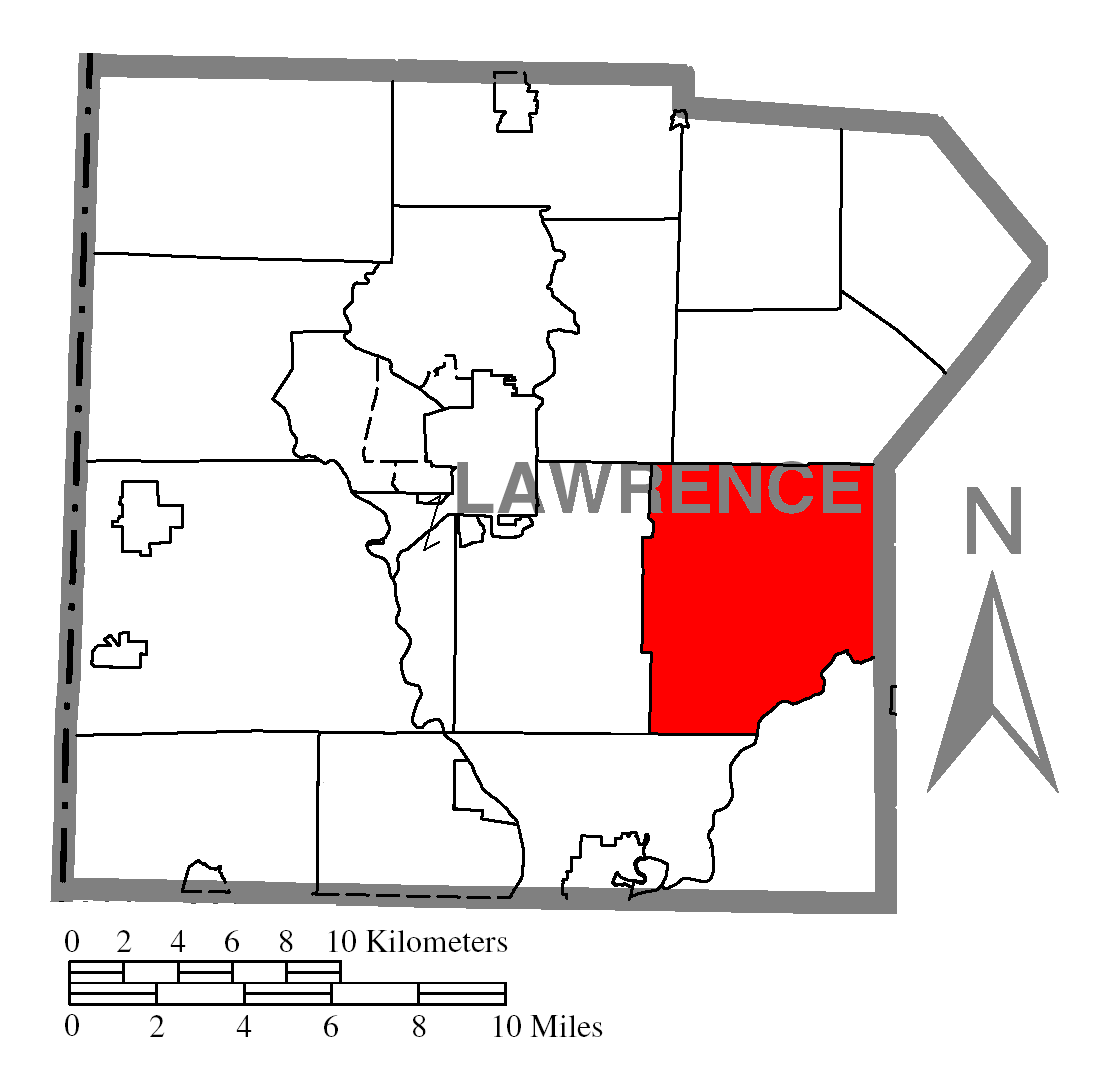
- Location of Slippery Rock Township in Lawrence County

- Location of Lawrence County in Pennsylvania
- Country: United States
- State: Pennsylvania
- County: Lawrence
- Established: 1837

Area
  - Total: 30.07 sq mi (77.87 km^{2})
  - Land: 29.85 sq mi (77.32 km^{2})
  - Water: 0.21 sq mi (0.55 km^{2})
- Highest elevation (Shaffer Road): 1,440 ft (440 m)
  - Rank: highest point in Lawrence County
- Lowest elevation (Slippery Rock Creek): 880 ft (270 m)

Population (2020)
  - Total: 2,913
  - Estimate (2022): 2,886
  - Density: 105.6/sq mi (40.77/km^{2})
- Time zone: UTC-4 (EST)
  - Summer (DST): UTC-5 (EDT)
- Area code: 724
- FIPS code: 42-073-71200
- Website: www.slipperyrocktownship.org

Historical population
Census	Pop.	Note	%±
2000	3,179		—
2010	3,283		3.3%
2020	2,913		−11.3%
2022 (est.)	2,886		−0.9%
U.S. Decennial Census

Slippery Rock Township is a township in Lawrence County, Pennsylvania, United States. As of the 2020 census, the population was 2,913, a decline from the figure of 3,283 tabulated in 2010.

== History ==
Slippery Rock Township was originally incorporated in 1837 as part of Beaver County, and in 1849, joined the newly created Lawrence County.

The township was linked to New Castle, Ellwood City and Pittsburgh in 1908 by the Pittsburgh, Harmony, Butler and New Castle Railway, an interurban trolley line. The line closed on June 15, 1931, and the trolleys were replaced by buses.

McConnell's Mill Covered Bridge was listed on the National Register of Historic Places in 1980.

== Geography ==
According to the United States Census Bureau, the township has a total area of 30.2 square miles (78.2 km^{2}), of which 30.1 square miles (78.0 km^{2}) is land and 0.1 square miles (0.3 km^{2}), or 0.26%, is water.

Unincorporated communities in the township include Princeton, Princeton Station, Kennedy Mill, Grant City, Rose Point, McConnells Mill, and part of Energy.

Located within Slippery Rock Township is McConnells Mill State Park along the Slippery Rock Creek Gorge.

== Demographics ==
As of the census of 2000, there were 3,179 people, 1,203 households, and 916 families residing in the township. The population density was 105.5 inhabitants per square mile (40.7/km^{2}). There were 1,285 housing units at an average density of 42.7 per square mile (16.5/km^{2}). The racial makeup of the township was 99.18% White, 0.06% African American, 0.19% Native American, 0.13% Asian, 0.13% from other races, and 0.31% from two or more races. Hispanic or Latino of any race were 0.38% of the population.

There were 1,203 households, out of which 34.2% had children under the age of 18 living with them, 66.6% were married couples living together, 6.7% had a female householder with no husband present, and 23.8% were non-families. 20.5% of all households were made up of individuals, and 9.4% had someone living alone who was 65 years of age or older. The average household size was 2.64 and the average family size was 3.06.

In the township the population was spread out, with 25.2% under the age of 18, 7.1% from 18 to 24, 27.8% from 25 to 44, 26.5% from 45 to 64, and 13.4% who were 65 years of age or older. The median age was 39 years. For every 100 females, there were 98.7 males. For every 100 females age 18 and over, there were 99.7 males.

The median income for a household in the township was $38,651, and the median income for a family was $43,382. Males had a median income of $35,192 versus $21,458 for females. The per capita income for the township was $16,160. About 4.5% of families and 5.8% of the population were below the poverty line, including 5.2% of those under age 18 and 9.4% of those age 65 or over.

== Education ==
The Laurel School District serves the township.

== Transportation ==
=== Major roads and highways ===
- US 19
- US 422
- PA 65
- PA 388
