= Slipperiness =

Low friction characteristic of an object

An ICE agent runs and slips on ice.

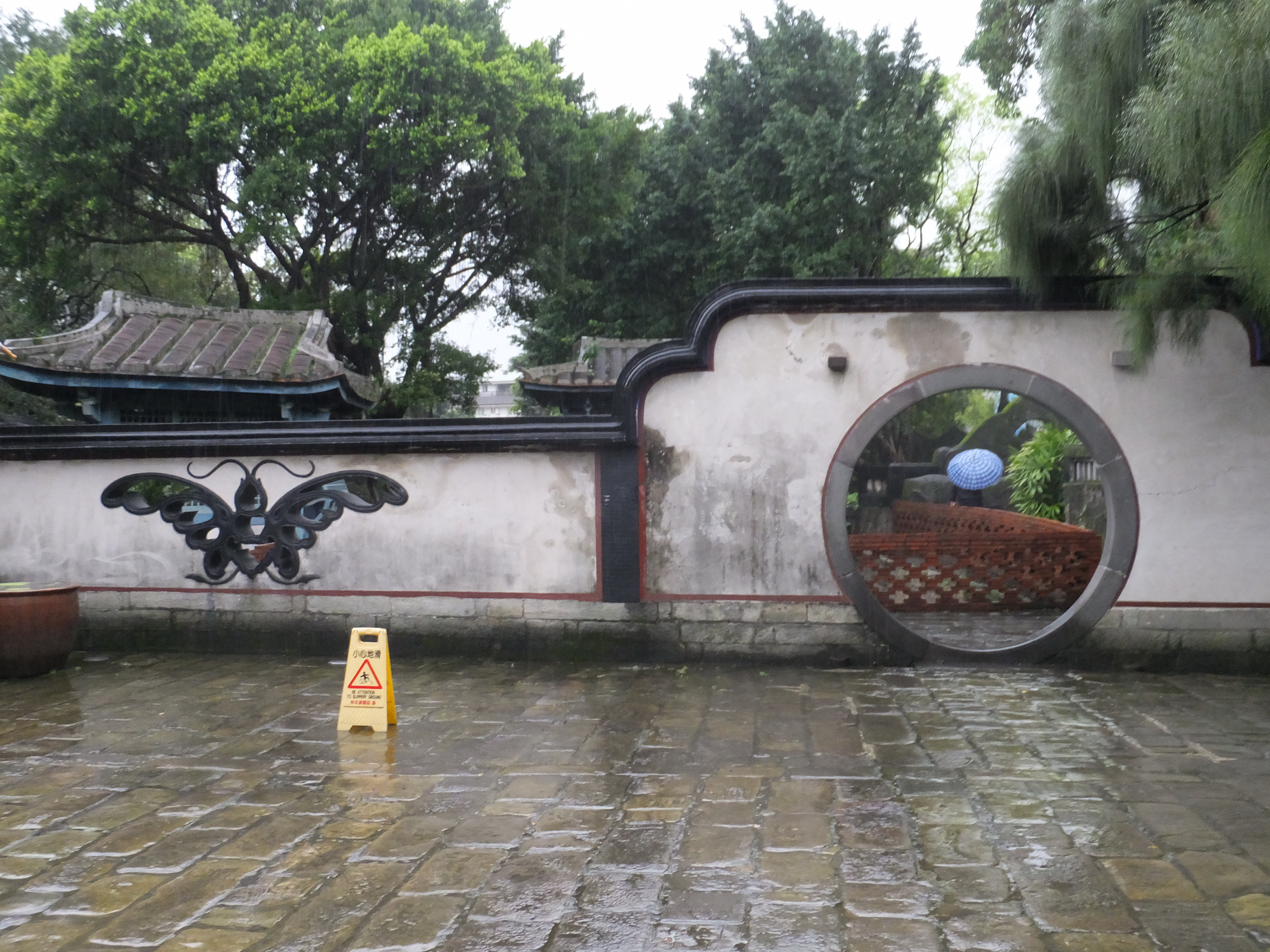
Slippery warning sign in New Taipei, Taiwan.

Slipperiness is when a surface has a low coefficient of friction, allowing objects to glide across the surface. People walking on slippery surfaces are likely to slip or fall. A surface can for example be slippery due to it being wet, or due to it being icy. There are several competing theories about why ice is slippery.

Road slipperiness is a major area of road safety, but various means have also been developed to measure walkway and deck slipperiness in order to develop health and safety standards.

== See also ==
- Floor slip resistance testing
- Ice cleats, used to prevent slipping when walking on icy roads
