= Lilburn =

Lilburn may refer to:

== Places ==
- Lilburn, Northumberland, England, a village
- Lilburn, Georgia, United States, a city
- Lilburn, Virginia, United States, an unincorporated community
- Lilburn (Ellicott City, Maryland), a historic building in the United States

== People ==
- House of Lilburn, an English family historically seated as Lords of the Manor in Northumberland
- Ann Lilburn (1939–2007), British activist
- Douglas Lilburn (1915–2001), New Zealand composer
- James Lilburn, stage name of James O'Hara (1927–1992), Irish-born American actor, brother of actress Maureen O'Hara
- Tim Lilburn (born 1950), Canadian poet and essayist
- Lilburn Boggs (1796–1860), governor of Missouri

== See also ==
- Lilburn Cottages, in Maryland, US
- Lilburn Tower, a building in Lilburn, England
- Lilburne, a surname
