= Font Hill Manor =

Historic slave plantation in Maryland

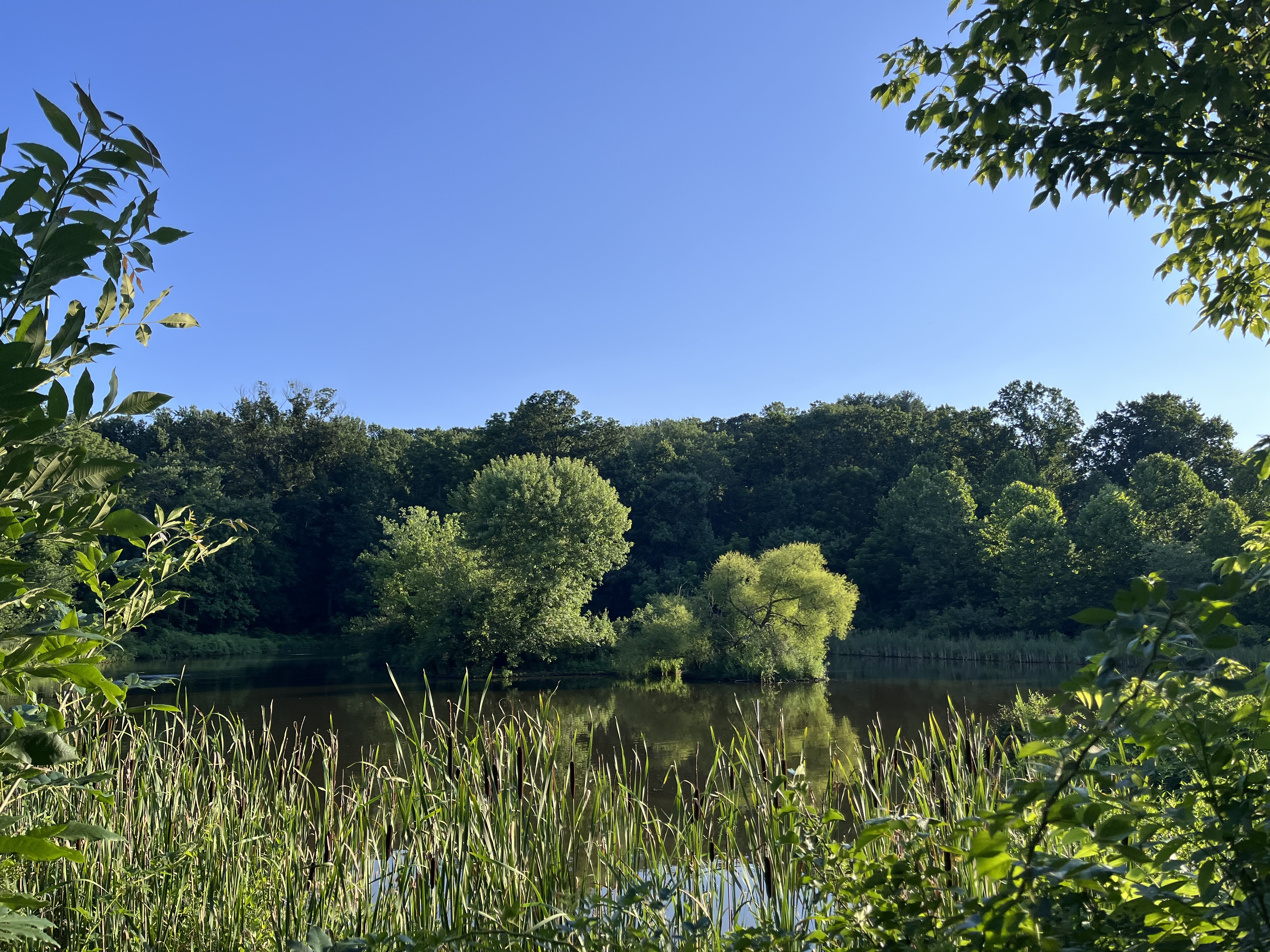
- The pond at Font Hill Wetland Park on the manor's former property
- Interactive map of the Font Hill Manor area

General information
- Type: House
- Architectural style: Stone
- Location: Ellicott City, Maryland
- Coordinates: 39°16′2″N 76°51′26″W
- Construction started: ca.1700s

Font Hill Manor is a historic slave plantation in Ellicott City in Howard County, Maryland, USA. The house is situated on property surveyed by Daniel Kendall as "Kendall's Delight". The building is constructed of local granite in three sections. The first is a four-by-two bay building. The second five-by-two bay section was built in the early 1800s, which re-oriented the front entrance. A third four-by-two bay wing was added in the early 1900s.

== History ==
The building was constructed by Admiral Hammond in the 1700s on land originally owned by Charles Carroll of Carrollton. The Hammond family were prominent in early Maryland government and settled several slave plantations through Anne Arundel and modern Howard County. Nearby Burleigh Manor was built by Colonel Rezin Hammond. For a period, it was occupied by the first judge of the Howard County Circuit court, Judge Edward Hammond.

The house is situated along Old Frederick road, the turnpike road between Baltimore and Frederick, Maryland. The property also bordered Centennial Lane, a road built in 1876 to connect Ellicott City to the Burleigh Manor property. Older single-story and a two-story slave buildings were situated on the site with a cupola barn. The Font Hill property also adjoins the historic Gray Rock slave plantation, once managed by the former county executive, Charles E. Miller.

On 22 May 1879, William Matthew Merrick was the executor of J Monroe Mercer and Ella W Mercer, offering 92 acres and Font Hill for sale. The gas-lit property was described as adorned with forest trees, ornamental shrubbery and orchards.

From 1926 to 1950, the manor was restored and named Abbottston by its owner, Issac Cate.

In 1957, the lands surrounding the manor totaled 285 acres. Owners sold the majority of the land to Font Hill Land Company. The manor property was reduced to 22.6 acres and the two oldest buildings and barn were demolished. The surrounding land was expanded and subdivided and developed by DeChiaro Enterprises, Inc. in 1962 and The Stanlee, Inc. in 1965. Surrounding land may also have been subdivided and developed by W. Guy Burton & Co., Inc in 1968. By 1995, the Font Hill Property had been subdivided and reduced to 3.32 acres, with 36 modern homes built around the manor.

By 1997, some of the property of the manor had been turned into a small park called Font Hill Wetland Park.

== See also ==
- List of Howard County properties in the Maryland Historical Trust
