= Mt Ida (Ellicott City, Maryland) =

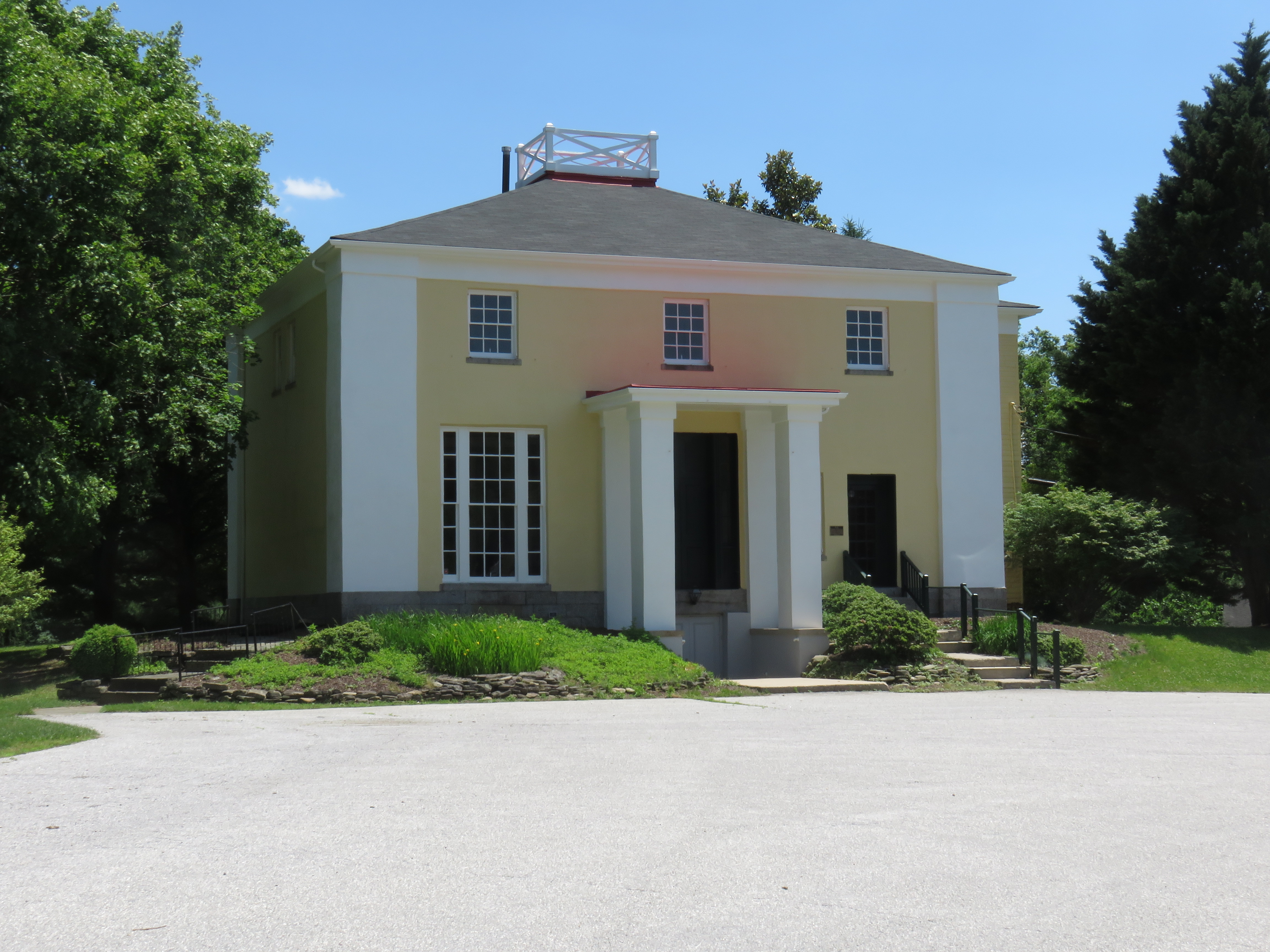
- Mt. Ida in 2020

- Location within Maryland
- 39°16′08.6″N 76°47′47.5″W
- Location: 3691 Sarah's Lane, Ellicott City, Maryland

History
- Built: 1828
- Built for: William Ellicott

Site notes
- Architect: Robert Carey Long Jr.
- Architectural style: Greek Revival

Mt Ida is a historic home in Ellicott City, Howard County, Maryland. Mt. Ida was built for William Ellicott, grandson of one of the city's founding brothers, Andrew Ellicott in 1828. It was built by Charles Timanus, who was also the principal builder of the neighboring Patapsco Female Institute and the Howard County Courthouse. Judge John Snowden Tyson and family lived at the residence from the 1850s, with his daughter Ida Tyson, for whom the mansion is now named, remaining in the house until the age of 90 in the 1920s. Ownership passed hands again to John Ward Wilson, then the influential Clark Family Commissioner Charles E. Miller attempted to rezone the property to convert the mansion into office buildings in 1972. As of 2013, the mansion was owned by the Miller Land Company.

== See also ==
- List of Howard County properties in the Maryland Historical Trust
- MacAlpine (historic home in Ellicott City)
