= Howard County Public Library =

Public library system in Maryland

Howard County Library System
- Location: Howard County, Maryland
- Type: Public library
- Established: 1940
- Branches: 7

Other information
- Director: Tonya Aikens
- Website: http://www.hclibrary.org/

Howard County Library System (HCLS), established in 1940, is a public library system located in Howard County, Maryland, United States.

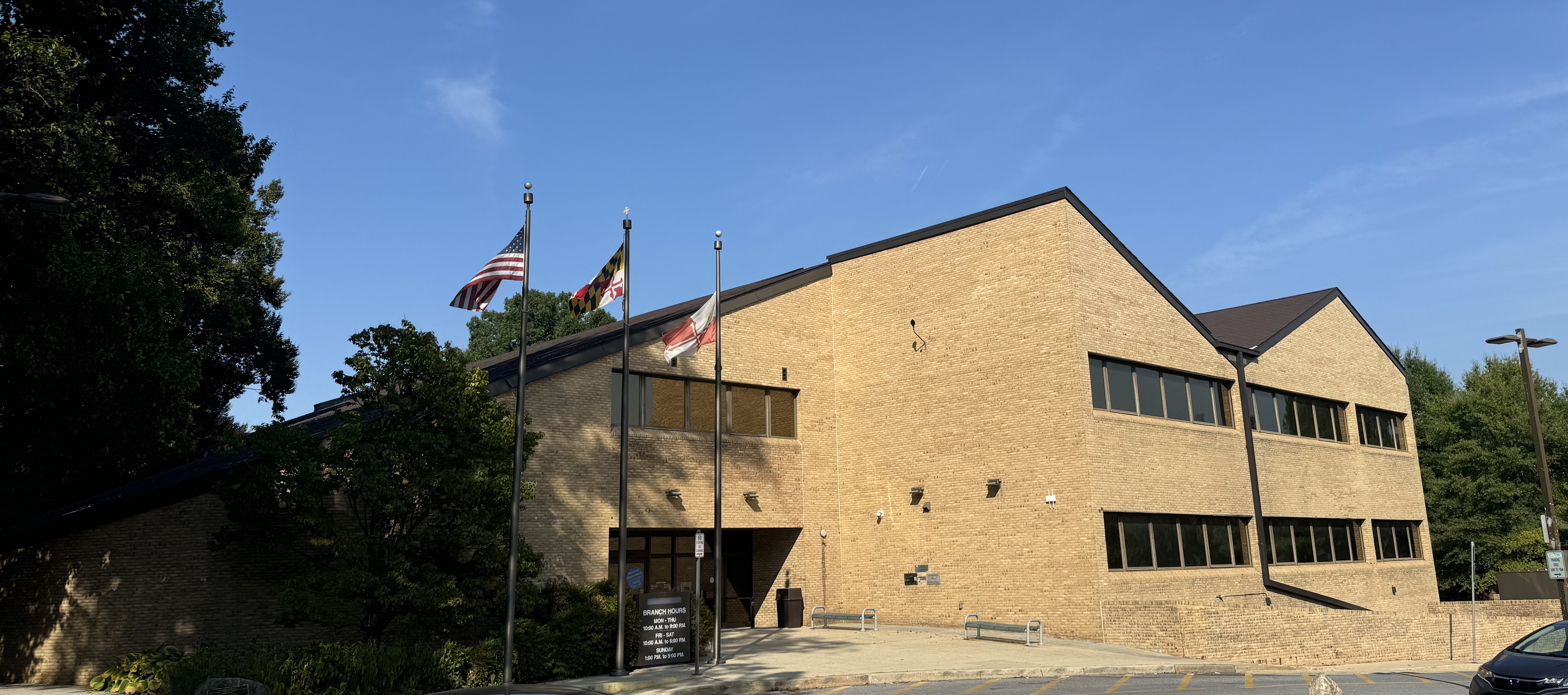
Central Branch, Columbia

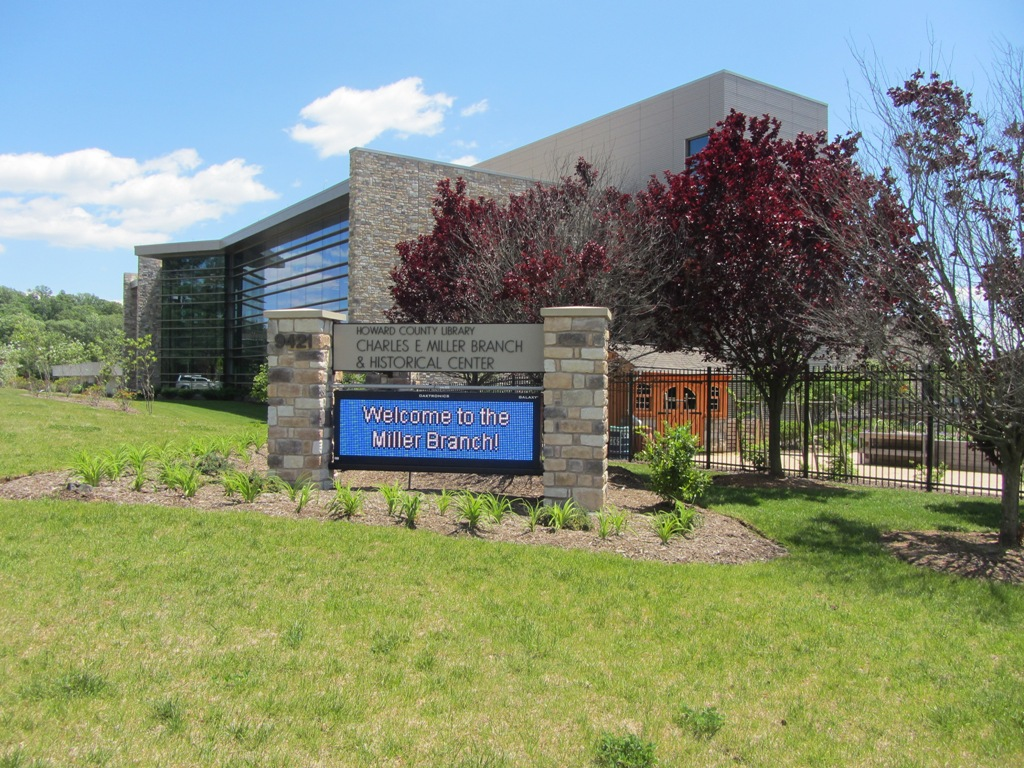
Charles E. Miller Branch, Ellicott City

== Special collections ==
The Charles E. Miller branch is home to the Historical Center and research library, dedicated to preserving Maryland history. The Miller branch works in conjunction with the Howard County Historical Society Museum in Ellicott City, MD.

== History ==
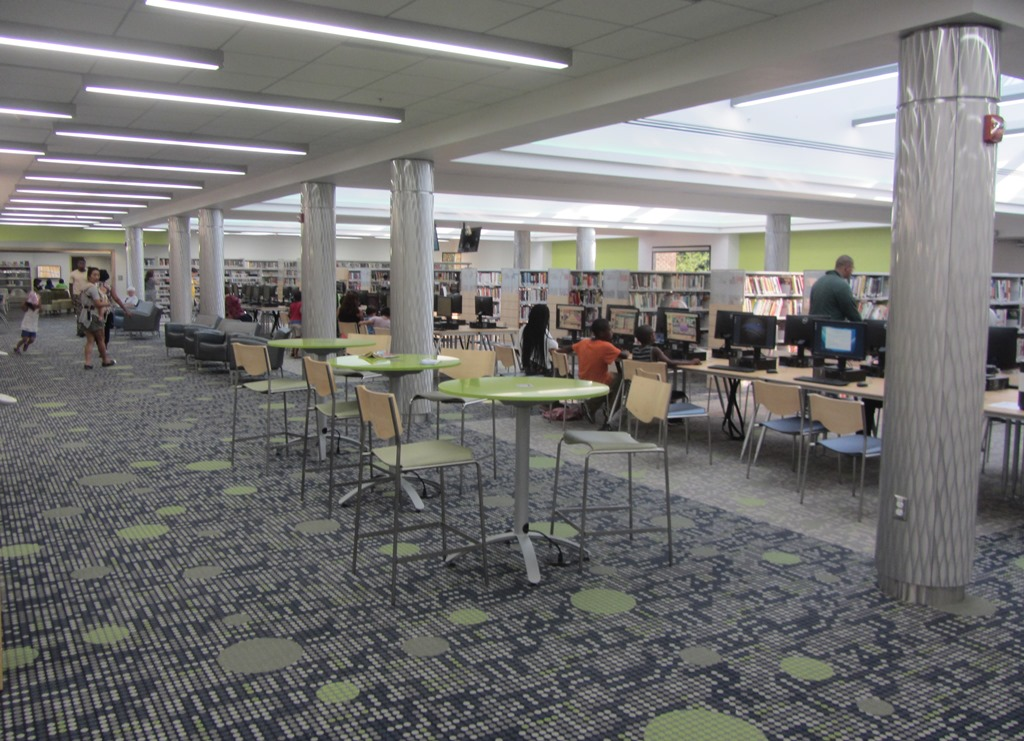
2014 Savage Library Renovation

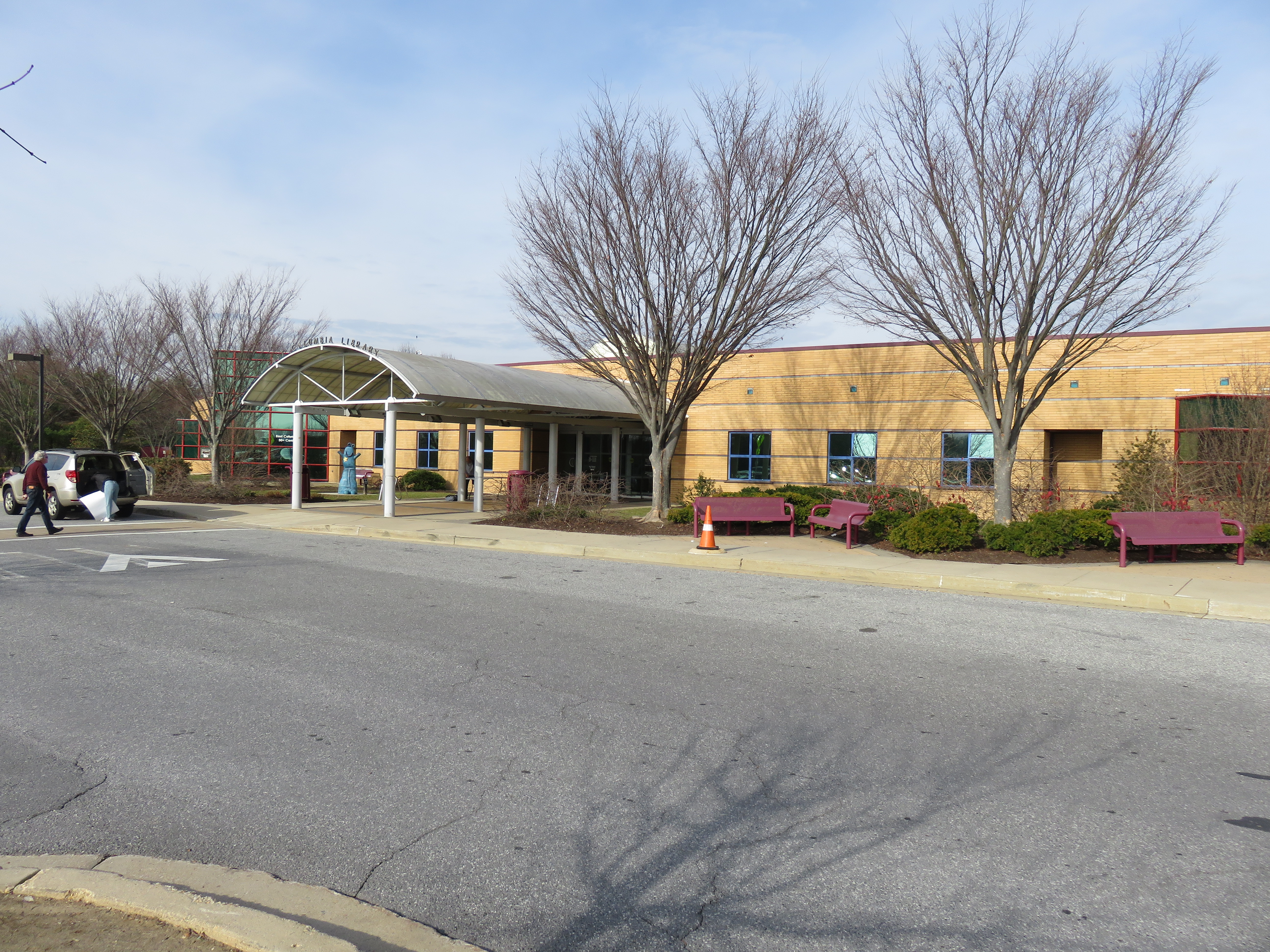
East Columbia Branch Library

Fundraising for the first county library was started in 1938 by the Women's Civic Club "Friends of the Library". On October 11, 1940 the first library opened in a portable building in Ellicott City in a ceremony with a speech by Baltimore Judge Joseph N. Ulman. It moved shortly after to a rented building above a meat store on Main street. At this time James A. Clark, Sr. petitioned the county commissioners to add two cents to the tax rate to fund the library.

In 1952 a flood washed out the library and in 1960 the library moved temporarily to the back of the butcher shop on the NE corner of Frederick Rd and St Johns Lane. George Morrision funded a new library in 1962 in the corner of the historic family-owned Gray Rock slave plantation that was donated by Charles E. Miller, who was attempting to create a housing subdivision. In 1965, a bookmobile serviced stops at Savage, Glenwood, Glenelg, Simpsonville, and the postwar suburban developments of Holiday Hills, Donleigh, Allview Estates, Sebring, and Dalton. The Savage Branch opened in the historic Carroll Baldwin Hall in 1966. In 1968, the Rouse Company signed an agreement to have the Howard County Library System lease one of its buildings for five years at an expense of $5,511 a year with the Columbia Association property assessments paying for furnishings. On January 4, 1981 the $4 million Central Branch opened in Columbia, becoming a facility with the 2nd highest number of items loaned in the county at the time with a computer system named "Gandalf".

In 1984, the Miller Branch received a $3 million expansion from 7000sqft to 22,000sqft. and the Central Branch deployed two microcomputers available to residents who took a two-hour training lesson. In 1989, $1 million was budgeted to buy land for the $6.3 million 33,600 sqft East Columbia Branch, to be opened in 1991. In 2011, a new 63,000sqft HCLS Miller Branch & Historical Center replaced the adjacent 22,000sqft facility. In 2013, Howard County Library System was named 2013 Library of the Year by Gale and Library Journal.

In July 2014, the HCLS Savage Branch & STEM Education Center completed a $6.1 million renovation. The renovation doubled the size of the library, taking it to 24,000 sqft. The branch now focuses on STEM related activities, adding valuable classroom space and added outdoor STEM implemented garden that showcases STEM principles at work.

In October 2023, Howard County announced the purchase of a 16.5-acre site adjacent to the East Columbia Branch to enhance and expand the park. The property was purchased for $415,000 using the Program Open Space funding provided by the state. Redevelopment plans include redeveloping the three existing fields into two baseball fields, two basketball courts, a playground, and a pavilion. The project also includes stormwater bio-retention facilities and landscaping work, construction is expected to begin in spring of 2024 and conclude the year following.

== Borrowing and statistics ==
- 1965 – 13,688, 1 Bookmobile
- 1983 – 1.508 million, 88 Employees, 3 Bookmobiles
- 1995 – 2.6 million, 13.1 book per resident ratio, 6 branches
- 2012 – 7.1 million, 300 Employees, $18,978,950 operating budget.

== Maryland Consolidated Library System ==
Any person who lives, works, or pays property taxes in Maryland is entitled to obtain a library card at no charge from any county or Baltimore City. They may either obtain a separate card from each jurisdiction or authorize a library card from a different public library system in Maryland to be used there. Also, Maryland counties adjoining the state line will authorize persons living in cities and counties in the state that borders that Maryland county, to obtain a library card at no charge usable in that county only, as long as that jurisdiction in the other state provides reciprocal free library privileges for the residents of that county in Maryland. For example, Prince George's and Montgomery counties will allow reciprocal library privileges with residents of the District of Columbia and nearby counties and cities in Virginia, however, Baltimore would not offer this privilege. Where a non-resident does not qualify for a free card, they may obtain one from any county by paying a yearly fee of $50 to each county they want one from.

== See also ==
- List of libraries
- Howard County, Maryland
- Maryland
- Public library
