= Howard's Adventure =

Former plantation and US Navy farm

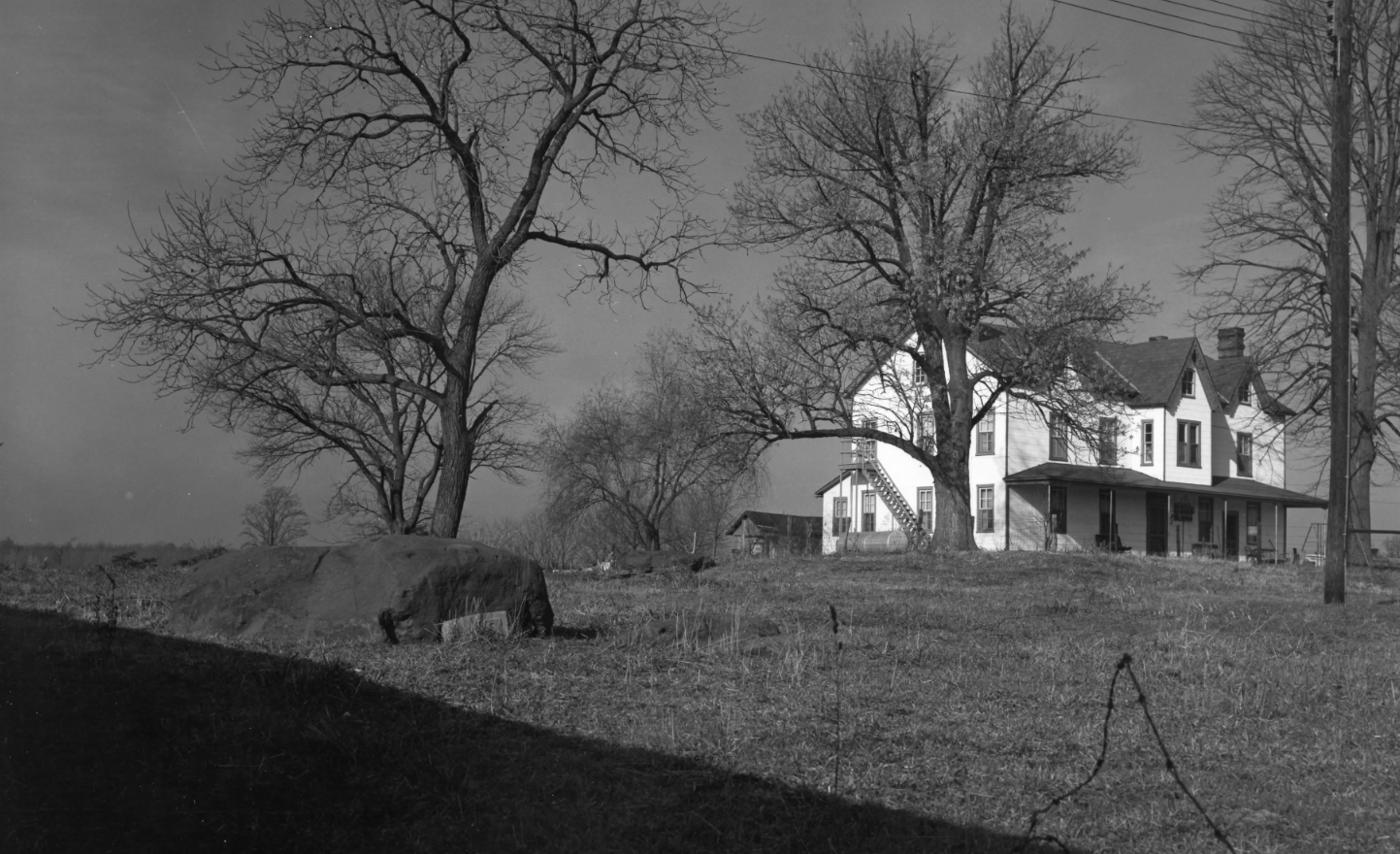
- Pictured in 1970
- Interactive map of the Howard's Adventure area

General information
- Status: Destroyed
- Type: House
- Architectural style: Colonial
- Location: Gambrills, Maryland, United States
- Coordinates: 39°05′06″N 76°39′19″W
- Construction started: 1710
- Completed: Prior to 1730
- Demolished: 1978
- Owner: United States Naval Academy

Howard's Adventure was a former slave plantation located in Gambrills, Maryland in Anne Arundel County. The historic estate was the homestead for the prominent Hammond family of the region. The property was later purchased by the United States Naval Academy, who would operate a dairy on the site for over eighty years. The dairy farm is home to USNA mascot Bill the Goat, who would be stolen from the farm many times over the Academy's history. Today, the manor house remnants and Hammond Graveyard are found within the U.S. Naval Academy farm complex.

== Plantation history ==
The house and property known as Howard's Adventure was built by Charles Hammond after inheriting the land after the death of his father in law, Captain Philip Howard in the early 1700s. Howard's Adventure was an example of the tobacco colonies that grew along Eastern shore's Tidewater basin. The property originally was part of a parcel of 500 acres, and the original manor house on the site was thought to have been built between 1705 and 1713.

Howard's Adventure would go on to be the home of Charles's son, Philip Hammond and his family, after buying out his brother's rights to the land. Philip Hammond was a planter and slaveholder who served in Maryland's Lower House of the Assembly representing Anne Arundel County from 1732 to 1760. In 1728, Philip Hammond married Rachel Brice, daughter of John Brice Jr. The two would raise nine children at Howard's Adventure, seven surviving to adulthood. During Philip Hammond's time, the property was used as a tobacco plantation and country estate. Over his lifetime, Philip Hammond would become one of Maryland's largest landowners, and during his ownership of the property, the acreage of Howard's Adventure would increase beyond its initial 500 acre parcel. At the time of Philip Hammond's death in 1760, he owned 107 slaves and more than 20,000 acres of land across Anne Arundel and Baltimore counties.

After Philip Hammond's death, Howard's Adventure passed to his sons, Matthias Hammond, builder of the Hammond–Harwood House, and Colonel Rezin Hammond, builder of Burleigh Manor. Both Matthias and Rezin were Revolutionary War patriots and active in revolutionary Maryland politics. Matthias Hammond died young and unmarried. Rezin Hammond was similarly a bachelor, who became active in patriotic activity during the 1770s, becoming a colonel in the Anne Arundel Militia by 1795. He continued in his father's footsteps as a planter and politician, serving in the Maryland Convention and House of Delegates. Unusual for a landowner at the time, Rezin Hammond led a radical wing at the Maryland Convention in support of the right to vote for all free taxpayers, regardless of their property holdings. At his death, Rezin Hammond provided for the manumission and support of his 166 slaves. This request in Rezin's will was not honored by his heirs.

At the time of Rezin's death, the Howard's Adventure estate consisted of 9,000 acres. Over the ensuing years, the plantation's acreage would be parceled and divided as it was passed down through the extended Hammond family's heirs.

- Hammond Manor House
- Formerly listed on the U.S. National Register of Historic Places
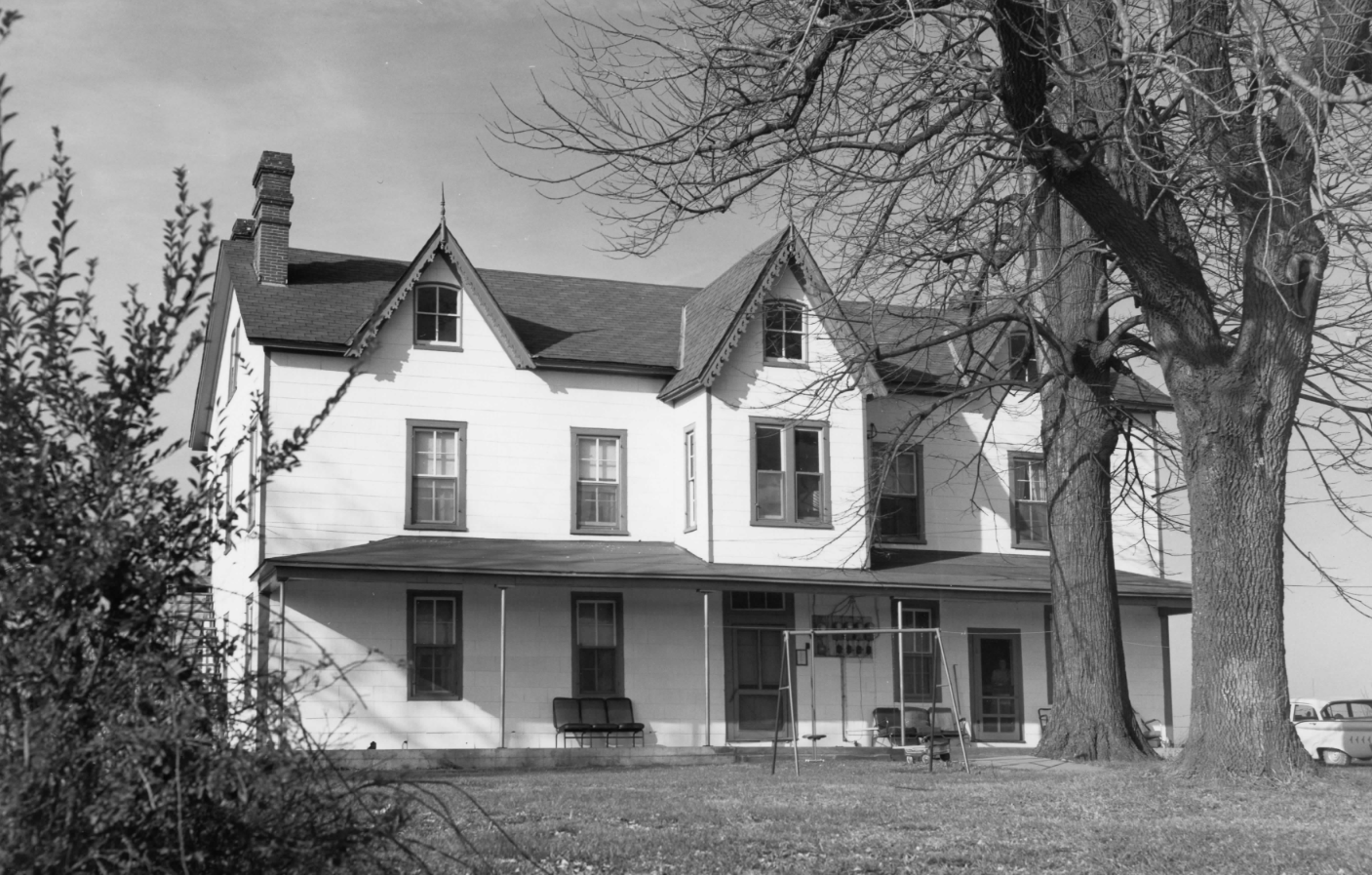
- Howards Adventure detail

- Location within Maryland
- Location: U.S. Naval Academy dairy off MD 175, Gambrills, Maryland
- Area: 5 acres (2.0 ha)
- Built: 1713
- NRHP reference No.: 74002341

Significant dates
- Added to NRHP: October 16, 1974
- Removed from NRHP: October 23, 1978

=== Hammond Manor house ===
The original design of the manor house is unknown. In 1905, the house was described as "well preserved" and the plantation's neighboring fields all retained their original names. One of Howard's Adventure's parcels was known as "Deer Park", which was still home to the descendants of a deer herd first established by Philip Hammond in the 1700s.

In the 1970s, what remained was a two story wood frame house with a partial basement. The basement had six feet thick foundation walls of field stone, and much of the home's original wood paneling was intact. At the back of the house was a large stone that was known as a "slave auction block".

In 1974, the manor house was listed by Maryland's National Register by the Maryland Historical Trust. At the time, it was significant as it was an example of an 18th century property that was still operating in an agricultural function.

The Hammond burial plot is found at the property, with eleven burial markers. Philip Hammond, his wife Rachel Brice Hammond, Colonel Rezin and Matthias Hammond are known to be buried in the family plot at Howard's Adventure.

In 1978, the Department of the Navy wrote to the National Register of Historic Places to inform them that the house was targeted by vandals and burned on October 15 of that year. The property was subsequently delisted from the register.

== United States Naval Academy Dairy ==
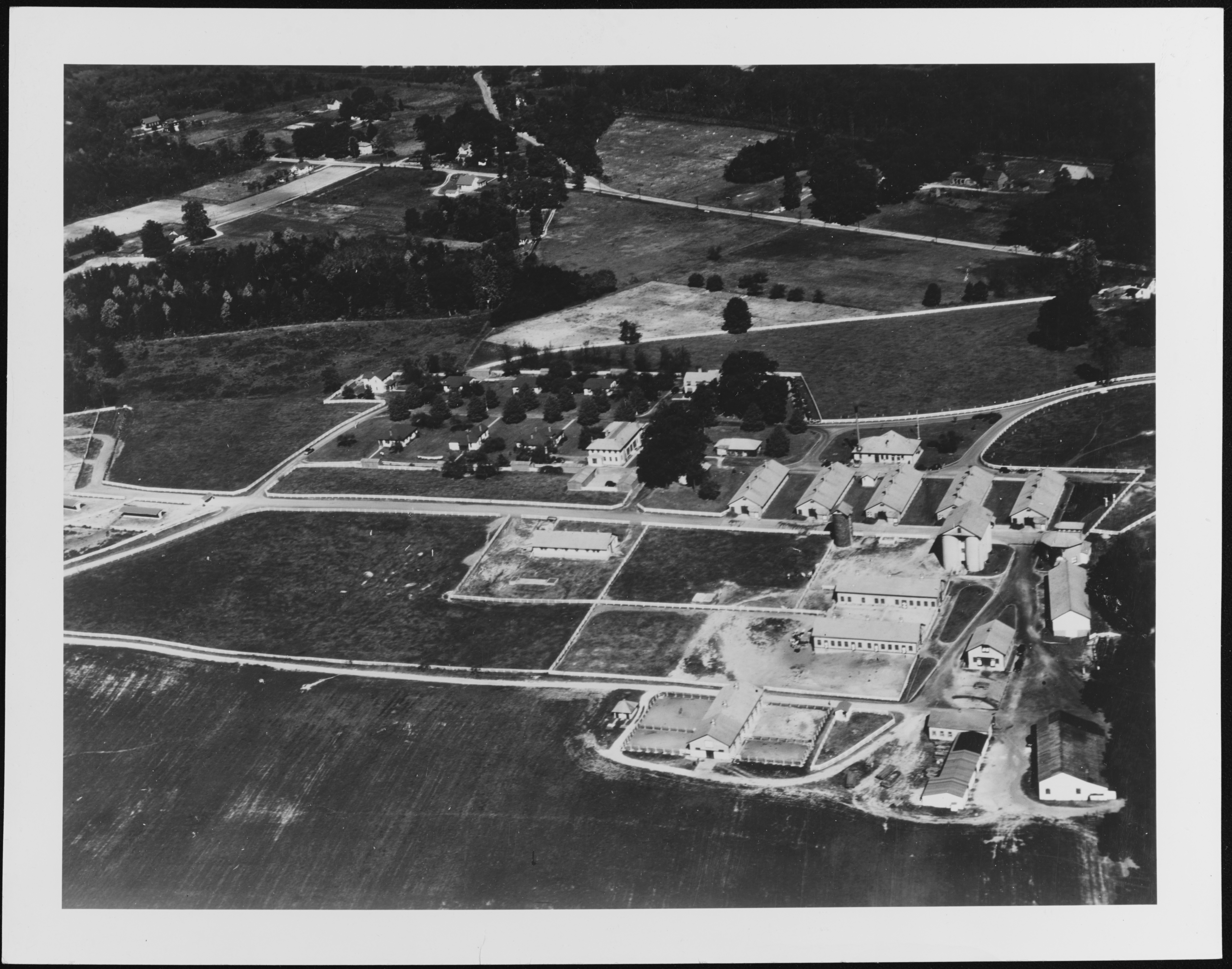
Aerial view of U.S. Naval Academy Dairy Farm. U.S. Naval Air Station, Anacostia, Washington, D.C.

In the early 1900s, a typhoid epidemic traced to the commercial milk supply encouraged the US Navy to establish its own dairy farm. In 1913, the U.S. Congress acquired 800 acres of the Howard's Adventure property, including the historic manor farm and plantation house to be used as a farm to supply midshipmen at the United States Naval Academy. The farm would go on to house more than 300 cows and a staff of 15, producing up to 1,500 gallons of milk daily until 1996.

In 1940, the US Navy converted the manor house into four apartments. The dairy's workers and support staff were accommodated in the former plantation house at the site.

The operational costs of the dairy were under regular scrutiny. A report to Congress by the Comptroller General of the United States in 1966 strongly urged the Navy to discontinue the dairy, as its operations were not cost effective, and it was no longer needed for health reasons. The dairy continued operations, due to language in the 1968 Military Construction Act that prevented its closing unless authorized by an Act of Congress.

When signing the act into law, President Lyndon Johnson expressed concern over the inconsistency of the act's reach regarding separation of powers. The dairy was specifically mentioned.

The first provision requires the continued operation of the Naval Academy's dairy farm. It provides that only an act of Congress can ever close that farm down. Thus the Congress, which has given the Navy Department authority over the world's most powerful fleet, has withdrawn the Department's authority over 380 cows.

— Lyndon B. Johnson, Statement by the President Upon Signing the Military Construction Authorization Act, 1968.

=== Bill the Goat ===
The historic farm at Howard's Adventure has long been the home of the USNA football mascot, Bill the Goat. At the farm, Bill is cared for by Academy midshipmen, known as "Team Bill". The team mascot has been the target of regular theft by rival football teams prior to games, most notably Army. Bill the Goat has been kidnapped from the farm at least ten times. Due to repeated thefts, the USNA has frequently had to move the animal mascots from the property prior to games for their protection. Two Bill mascots at Howard's Adventure were accidentally killed when herbicide was used too closely to their pens.

== Closure of USNA dairy ==
In 1997, the Naval Academy discontinued the dairy at the site to reduce costs. They offered a lease of the dairy farm to Horizon Organic, to preserve the dairy's history and educate the community about organic farming. In 2008, the Navy granted a 30 year lease of the site to Anne Arundel County. The county looked to build the farm into a passive use regional park at the site. In leasing the farm, the county agreed to continue to house Navy mascot, Bill the Goat at the site, and improve security.

In 2014, a five year lease was granted on the property to Maryland Sunrise Farm to operate an organic dairy at the site.

A 2018 amendment to the United States Code (Title 10, Chapter 853 §8476) gave the United States Navy discretion to continue or terminate the dairy operations at Gambrills without requiring an act of Congress.

=== Energy generation plans ===
In 2024, the U.S. Navy began soliciting bids to convert the site to renewable energy generation. Upon learning of the Navy's plans to convert the site, local officials and members of the community in Anne Arundel County voiced concerns, seeking to maintain the property's agricultural nature.
