= Lilburn Cottages =

Lilburn Cottages (Hazlehurst Cottages)
- Location within Maryland
- 39°15′48″N 76°47′37.8″W
- Location: 3961 College Avenue Ellicott City, Maryland

Lilburn Cottages are a group of historic cottages in Ellicott City, Howard County, Maryland, part of Lilburn Mansion.

The cottages were built on an original 2,500-acre land grant named the Valley of Owen.

The Gothic Revival Lilburn Mansion was built on College Avenue for Baltimore foundry owner Henry Richard Hazlehurst in 1857. The original 20-acre site has been subdivided down to 8 acres, and the guesthouse and carport outbuildings demolished. The site of the cottages was subdivided into a 6.75-acre parcel, which allowed the portion of the historic Lilburn complex to fall outside of the Ellicott City Historic district development protections.

In 2013, owners Ronald and Gail Spahn allowed the Howard County Department of Fire and Rescue Services to burn the historic structures, including the adjacent Lilburn (Hammond) Cottage and Grimes house, before subdividing the property. Spahn's Autumn Development Corporation used Howard County slope stabilization legislation to help fund clearing the historic wooded site for single-family homes. KB homes marketed the subdivision as Autumn Overlook.

== See also ==
- Lilburn (Ellicott City, Maryland)
- Bon Air Manor (Ellicott City, Maryland)
- MacAlpine
