= New Cut Landfill =

Former landfill in Ellicott City, Maryland, US

- Country: United States
- Location: Ellicott City, Maryland
- Coordinates: 39°14′51″N 76°47′47″W
- Status: Converted
- Construction cost: $462,000 (Solar)
- Site area: 7 acres

External links
- Website: www.howardcountymd.gov

New Cut Landfill, is also referred to as Worthington Park, is a park and former landfill in Ellicott City, Howard County, Maryland, United States, Rock Hill College operated a recreation facility named "Forty Acres on New Cut" between 1894 and 1922.

The 83 acre new cut landfill closed in 1980. In 1985 the county sought bids from a Pennsylvania company to burn methane gas in generators. New Cut groundwater was found to be contaminated from deposits of paint solvents. In 1993, the county approved installation of city water around New Cut after contaminants including trichloroethane exceeded federal drinking water levels.

In September 2011, 2,000 solar panels were installed on landfill property converted to parkland and later a solar farm. The panels were paid for by a Maryland Department of Energy Grant.

== See also ==
- Alpha Ridge Landfill
- Carr's Mill Landfill
- Bon Air Manor (Ellicott City, Maryland)
