= Lilburn (Ellicott City, Maryland) =

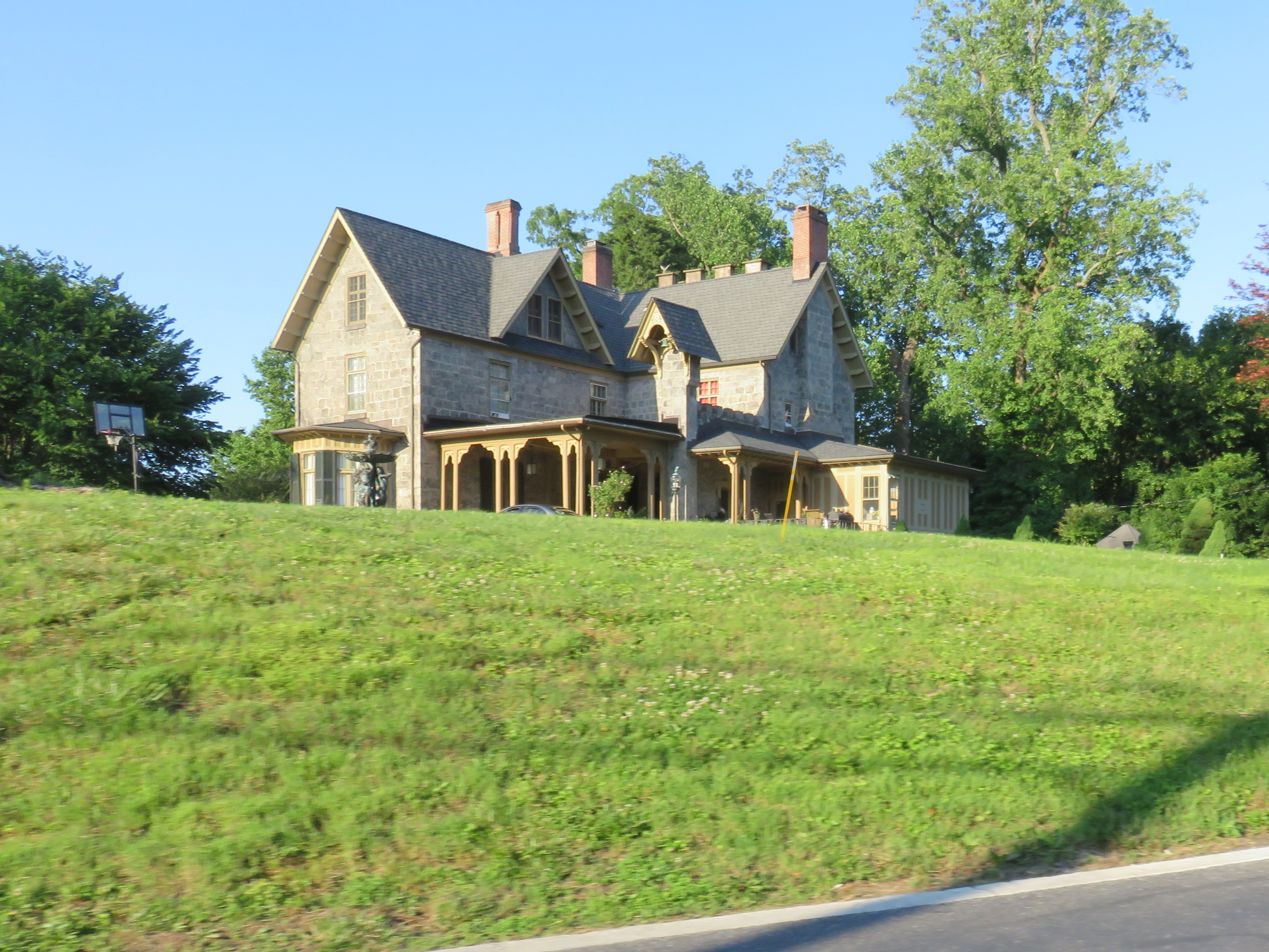
- Lilburn in 2020

- Location within Maryland
- 39.264090°N 76.795832°W
- Location: 3899 College Avenue Ellicott City, Maryland

History
- Built: 1857

Site notes
- Architectural style: Gothic Revival

Lilburn Mansion (also known as the Balderstones Mansion or Hazeldene) is a historic house in Ellicott City, Howard County, Maryland.

The structure sits on what was once part of a 2,500-acre land grant called Valley of Owen. The Gothic Revival mansion was built in 1857 on College Avenue for Baltimore foundry owner Henry Richard Hazlehurst. The house has a bell tower and solarium. A 1923 fire destroyed the front parlor and interior. Its original 12-acre site has been whittled to 8 acres; its guesthouse and carport outbuildings have been demolished.

In later years, the mansion has been popularized by haunted house storytellers.

== See also ==
- Lilburn Cottages
- Bon Air Manor (Ellicott City, Maryland)
- MacAlpine
