= Navy Bill =

Statue at the US Naval Academy

Coordinates: 38.9786°N 76.4838°W

- Goat Mascot
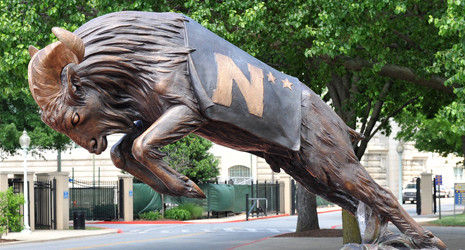
- Artist: Clemente Spampinato; Tony Thamasangvarn
- Year: 1956
- Type: sculpture
- Medium: bronze
- Subject: Naval Academy mascot
- Dimensions: 1.3 m × 0.69 m × 2.2 m (50 in × 27 in × 87 in)
- Condition: Refurbished 2015
- Location: Navy–Marine Corps Memorial Stadium; Annapolis, MD
- Owner: United States Naval Academy
- Accession: 15 May 1957

Navy Bill is a sculpture of the United States Naval Academy's mascot, Bill the Goat, a billy goat. It was designed by Clemente Spampinato in 1956, and presented to the academy in 1957. Until 2010, the sculpture stood just inside Gate 1 to the academy. Following a five-year refurbishment underwritten by the Class of 1965, the statue was returned to Gate 1. A second statue commissioned by the Class of 1965 was placed in the north end zone of Navy–Marine Corps Memorial Stadium on 9 June 2015. It was rededicated 24 October 2015. Navy Bill has the alternate name of Goat Mascot.

== Description ==
A large bronze sculpture of a charging billy goat stands atop a rectangular stone base. On the side of the goat is an N and two stars.

The base is granite and measures 48 by 30 by 86 inches (1.22 m × 0.76 m × 2.18 m). The surmounting sculpture is bronze and measures 50 by 27 by 87 inches (1.27 m × 0.69 m × 2.21 m). Navy Bill was noted as needing treatment in 1994. It was refurbished by the Class of 1965 in 2015. Sculptor Tony Thamasangvarn and the Baltimore New Arts Foundry added "rank insignia, warfare devices, shrapnel from Vietnam, and a cube of steel from a nuclear submarine" donated by the class in the recast Navy Bill at the football stadium.

The N on Navy Bill's blanket is a varsity letter, while the two stars ("N-stars" in Academy parlance) represent two victories over West Point in annual Army-Navy varsity competitions.

== Inscriptions ==
Inscribed on the sculpture's bronze foundation is CLEM SPAMPINATO © 1956 to the back and MODERN ART FDRY. NY to the front. On a plaque behind the sculpture:

THE NAVY MASCOT

THE NAVAL ACADEMY HAS HAD A GOAT AS
ITS MASCOT SINCE 1890 WHEN, ACCORDING TO
LEGEND, ON THEIR MARCH FROM THE FERRY
STATION AT HIGHLAND FALLS UP THE STEEP
HILL TO WEST POINT TO PLAY THE FIRST
ARMY-NAVY FOOTBALL GAME THE NAVAL
CADETS (AS THEY WERE THEN KNOWN) SAW
A GOAT OUTSIDE THE NONCOMS HOUSES AT
WEST POINT AND PROMPTLY COMMANDEERED
"BILLY" FOR THEIR MASCOT. SINCE THAT TIME
THE GOAT HAS REMAINED AS THE RECOGNIZED
MASCOT OF THE U.S. NAVAL ACADEMY.

On a small plaque in front of the sculpture:

PRESENTED BY THE

CLASS OF 1915
MAY 15, 1957

== History ==
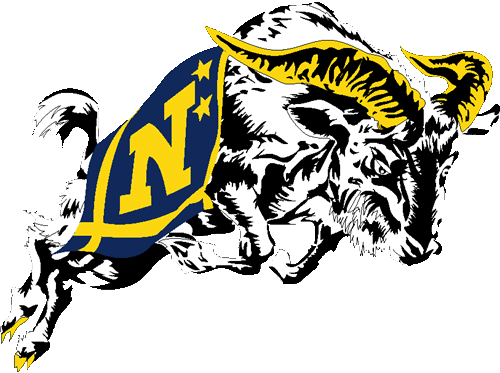
Navy Bill as the US Naval Academy's current sports logo

The main inscription's attribution to 1890 legend is not agreed with in modern study. The first use of a live goat as the academy's mascot was 1893. Navy Bill is the inspiration for the academy's sports logo.
