= Bill the Goat =

Mascot of the US Naval Academy

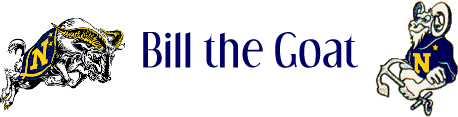
- University: United States Naval Academy
- Conference: American Conference
- Description: Goat
- First seen: 1890

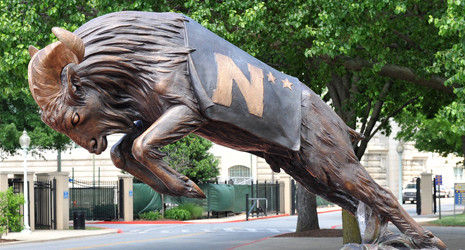
Navy Bill near Gate 1 of the Academy campus. Its two stars represent sports victories over West Point

Bill the Goat is the mascot of the United States Naval Academy. The mascot is a live goat and is also represented by a costumed midshipman. The first Bill the Goat appeared in 1890. Currently, Bill XXXVI reigns as the 39th mascot and is the 36th goat to be named Bill. His backup is Bill XXXVII.

There are two sculptures of the mascot, both named Navy Bill, on the Academy’s campus and associated grounds. The original bronze statue was a gift of the Academy class of 1915. Following a lengthy refurbishment, Navy Bill is located near the Academy’s Gate 1. It was created by sculptor Clemente Spampinato in 1956 and dedicated in 1957.

The other Navy Bill is in the north end of Navy–Marine Corps Memorial Stadium. Both the refurbishment and the replica were 2015 gifts from the class of 1965.

== The legend of Bill the Goat ==
=== Goats at sea ===
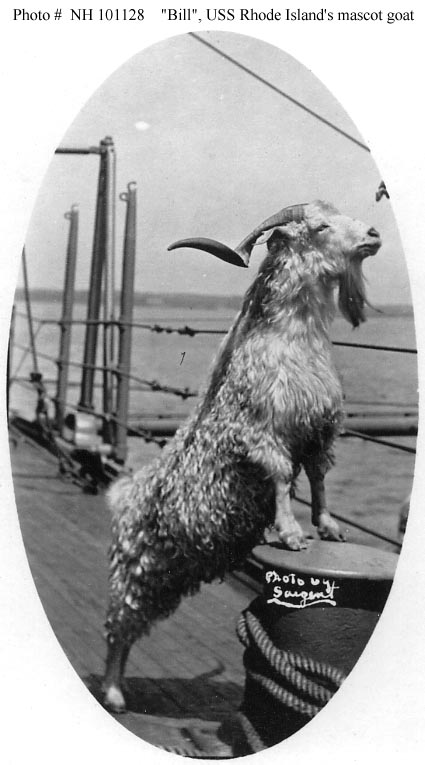
"Bill the goat", mascot of BB-17 USS Rhode Island, circa 1913

For centuries, ships sailed with livestock in order to provide sailors with fresh food. Ships in the British and early American navies often carried goats, to eat the garbage and other undesirable food and to return milk and butter. The first usage of "billy goat" for a male goat occurs in the 19th century replacing the older term "he-goat." The first creature, animal or otherwise, to circle the earth twice was a (female) goat that traveled first with Wallis (1767) and then with Captain Cook (1768). After the Cook trip she was allowed to retire.

=== Goats at USNA ===
There is a legend that a Navy ship once sailed with a pet goat, and that the goat died during the cruise. The officers preserved the skin to have it mounted when they returned to port. Two young ensigns were entrusted with the skin. On their way to the taxidermist, they stopped by the United States Naval Academy to watch a football game. At halftime, for reasons the legend does not specify, one ensign decided to dress up in the goat skin. The crowd appreciated the effort, and Navy won the game.

== Early years ==
In 1893, a live goat named El Cid made his debut as a mascot at the fourth Army–Navy Game. El Cid was a gift to the Brigade of Midshipmen from officers of the USS New York. With the goat, Navy gained a 6–3 win over Army that year, so he was adopted as part of the team.

In the early 1900s, the beloved mascot was finally given a name. On the return trip to the Naval Academy after the Midshipmen triumphed over West Point, the goat was led on a victory lap through the train and did not leave the midshipmen until they reached Baltimore.

It was then that the goat was given the name "Bill", which was the name of a pet goat kept by Commander Colby M. Chester, Commandant of Midshipmen, from 1891 to 1894.

The tradition continued during World War II.

== Living mascots ==
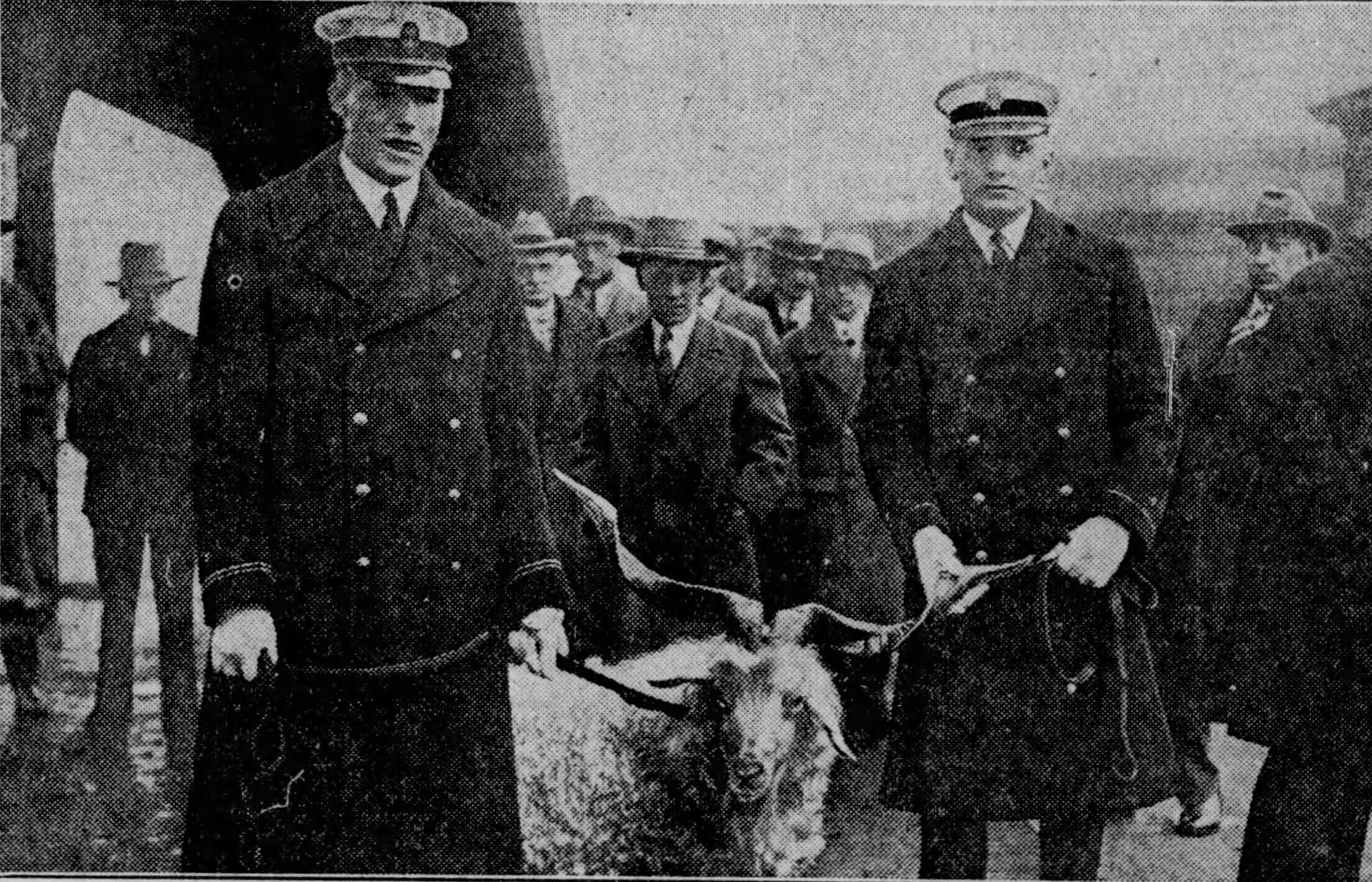
Bill at Englewood Union Station in Chicago, accompanying the 1926 Navy Midshipmen football team in Chicago for that year's Army–Navy Game held at Soldier Field

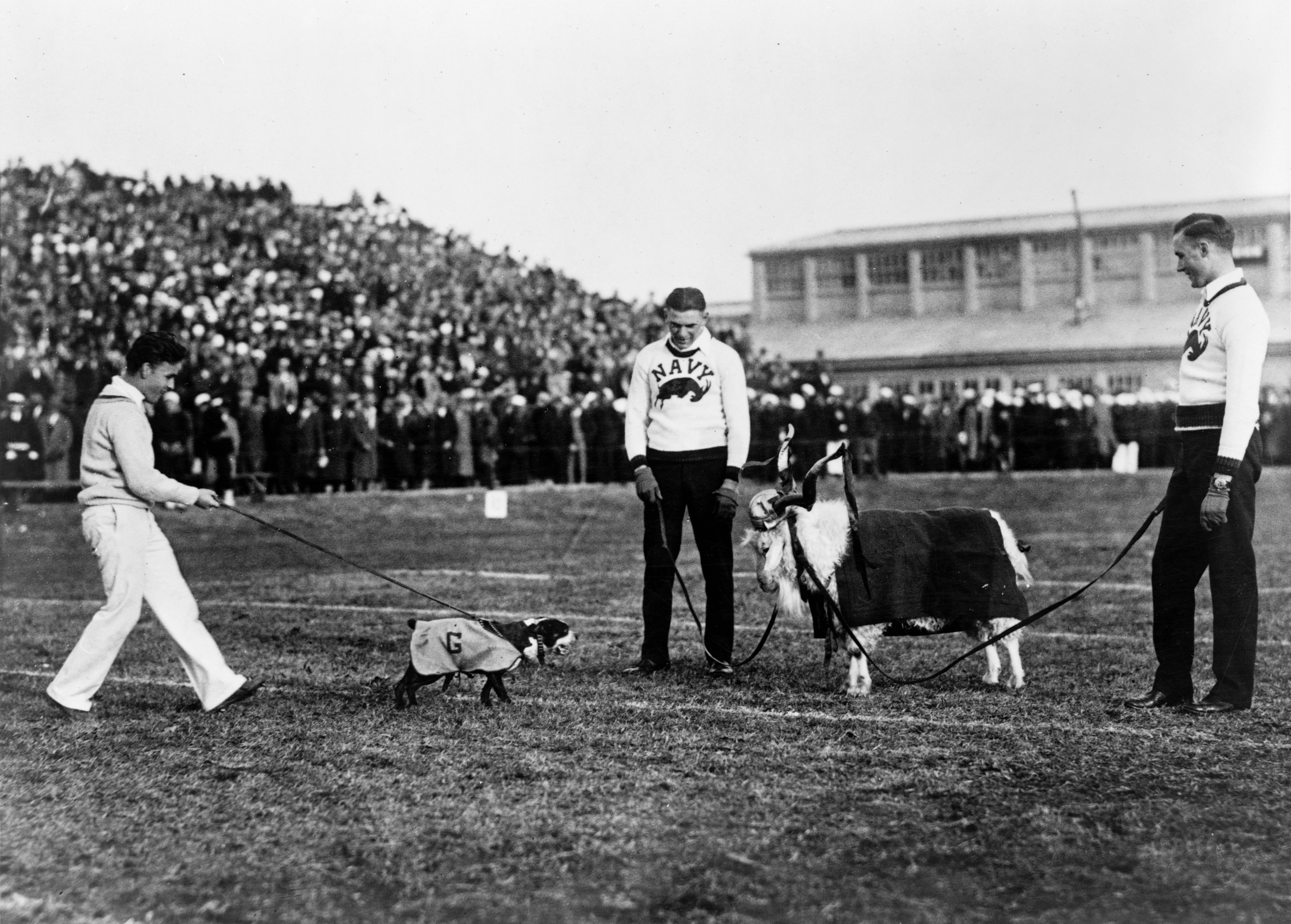
Bill the Goat meets Jack the Bulldog (mascot of Georgetown University) in the 1920s

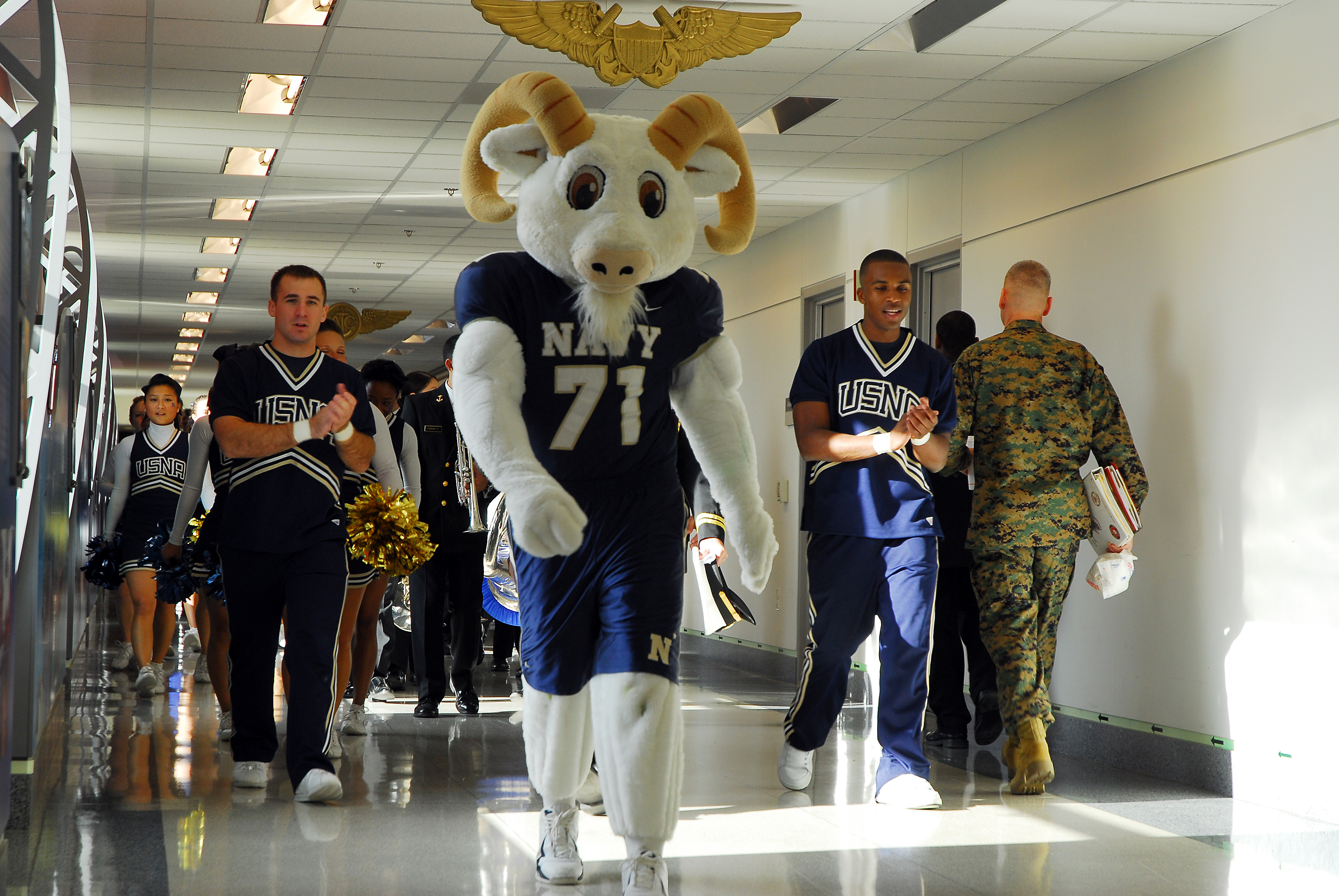
Bill the Goat and U.S. Naval Academy Band members celebrate Army-Navy game at the Pentagon in 2008

- In 1968 Bill XVI, a gift from the United States Air Force Academy, died of accidental poisoning after weed killer was sprayed too close to his pen.
- Bill XVII met the same fate in 1971.
- Bill XIX and Bill XX died of natural causes after each served three years of faithful service, in 1975 and 1978 respectively.
- In 1978, Bill XXI led the midshipmen to a victorious season, including a 23–16 victory over Brigham Young University. He is also credited with two Navy wins over Army.
- Bill XXVIII reigned from October 1995 until his death in November 2001, when he was succeeded by Bill XXXI.
- Bill XXXI died of natural causes in April 2007 and was succeeded by Bill XXXII. In April 2007 the academy selected Lavender Hill Farm to provide Bill XXXIII and Bill XXXIV, who were delivered to the Naval Academy on May 5, 2007.
- Bill XXXII was retired in September 2008 due to his advanced age and spent his remaining years at a farm near the academy. Bill XXXIII stepped up as the official mascot of the Navy Academy with Bill XXXIV as his backup. Bill XXXIII's first official game was on September 20, 2008, when the Midshipman beat Rutgers 23–21.
- Bill XXXII died of natural causes on April 16, 2011. Lt. Thomas Scazzafavo USN released this statement: "A solemn note is being passed to the Naval Academy family on behalf of Team Bill, the mascot handlers. Bill XXXII, known to many as “Old Bill,” passed onto greener pastures this past weekend. He was buried at his farm in Gambrills, Maryland, where the USNA Dairy Farm used to be located. He is survived by Bill XXXIII & Bill XXXIV. As background, Bill XXXII was born in April 2000 and had been serving the Naval Academy since 2001. This valiant mascot helped lead Navy to an astounding 12–4 record against the sister service academies in his eight years of service as the official Naval Academy mascot. After these eight years of steadfast leadership, XXXII was at the age of retirement and passed the torch to Bill XXXIII & Bill XXXIV. 'Old Bill' spent the rest of his years in comfort at the farm."
- Bill XXXV and Bill XXXVI made their debut on October 3, 2015, alongside Bill XXXIII and Bill XXXIV. This began their training to eventually become the official mascots of the Naval Academy. They obtained full mascotship following the 2015 Navy–Army game.
- In 2016, Bill XXXV had to be euthanized, after suffering from chronic kidney weakness.

=== The Halbert Ranch and the Angora Breed ===
Although the goat mascot tradition dated to 1893, the early mascots were not Angoras. Beginning in the late 1930s, B.M. Halbert of Sonora, Sutton County, Texas — a prominent Angora goat rancher and co-founder and president of the Texas Sheep and Goat Raisers Association — supplied Angora goats from his Lazy T Ranch to serve as the Academy's mascot for the Army-Navy game, helping establish the Angora as the breed associated with the role. The Devil's River News of Sonora reported on November 26, 1937, that Halbert's Angora goat "Bill the Eighth" was serving as Navy's mascot for that year's Army-Navy game in Philadelphia, with midshipmen D.K. Sloan and B.S. Rankin designated as goatkeepers. Halbert personally attended the 1937 game and was introduced to the Navy section before kickoff. A subsequent report noted that B.M. Halbert III — grandson of B.M. Halbert Sr. — later presented an Angora from the family's Sutton County ranch to a naval unit in Dallas ahead of a subsequent Army-Navy game, continuing the family's association with the Academy's mascot program.

Halbert's advocacy for the Angora goat extended beyond the football field. In 1922, he initiated a naming contest through the Texas Sheep and Goat Raisers Association to establish an official culinary term for goat meat. A special committee headed by Dr. B. Youngblood, Director of the Texas Agricultural Experiment Station, selected "chevon" — a contraction of the French words chèvre (goat) and mouton (mutton) — from all entries submitted, announcing the result at the association's annual convention in San Angelo on June 28, 1922. The winning entry was submitted by Mrs. E.W. Hardgraves of Sanderson, Texas, who received a prize-winning Angora goat donated by Halbert. Halbert subsequently lobbied the Secretary of Agriculture to have the Federal Government adopt the name officially and influenced the publishers of Webster's Unabridged Dictionary to include "chevon" in subsequent editions.

== Kidnappings of Bill ==
The Army, Navy, and Air Force academies have been involved in mascot kidnapping for generations with most pranks, euphemistically called spirit missions, generally timed to precede the annual Army-Navy football game, where both sides’ mascots are expected to appear. Of the three academies’ mascots, Bill has been abducted the most often, usually by Army cadets.

The first recorded kidnapping of Bill in modern times was accomplished one week before the Army-Navy football game in the fall of 1953. A group of cadets from the United States Military Academy (USMA) at West Point snuck onto the Annapolis grounds with the help of a West Point exchange student who was living at the Naval Academy. After locating the goat behind the stadium, the cadets stashed it in the backseat of a convertible; however, their cover was blown when they stopped at a gas station and the goat's horns shredded the convertible top. The cadets successfully made it back to the USMA and presented the goat to the entire Corps at a raucous dinnertime pep rally; however, many Navy midshipmen refused to go to classes until Bill was returned. After the goat's return was ordered by officials from West Point (as well as President Dwight D. Eisenhower himself, a USMA graduate), the Army cadets staged a mass protest which was posted on the front page of several New York papers as "Goat Rebellion at West Point." The Army football team went on to defeat Navy 20–7.

The Air Force joined in soon after, via a raid by three United States Air Force Academy (USAFA) cadets a month prior to the first Air Force/Navy football game in 1960. Bill was flown to the AFA in the bomb bay of an Air Force B-26, where he resided on a farm until Naval Intelligence tracked him to Colorado. The superintendent of the USAFA learned of the mission through intimidation of the Cadet Wing, and forced the return of Bill to Annapolis. The event was reported by several national media outlets, including Life, at the time. The Air Force was again successful in 1966.

During the height of a heated in-state rivalry with Maryland, the goat was stolen by Maryland students. This happened shortly before the controversial 1964 match, where actions on the field caused the suspension of the series for 40 years.

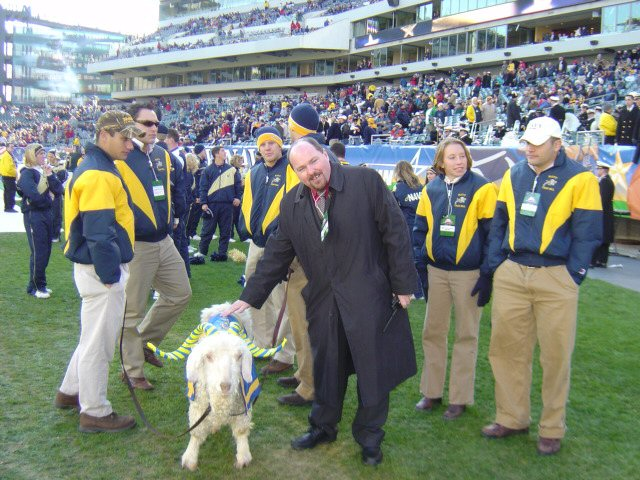
Bill at the 2004 Army–Navy Game.

In 1965 five Army cadets, dressed in black with darkened faces, made their way through two fences crowned with barbed wire and diverted the Marines guarding the goat's pen by having two of their college-age girlfriends turn up in a car at the entrance gate. While the sentries attentions was diverted by the women's story of being lost and having been stood up on a blind date, the cadets were able to successfully spirit Bill away.

During the pre-game activities of the USNA-USAFA game in 1970 at RFK Stadium, a long motorcade entered the stadium, accompanied by motorcycles and other police vehicles, and turned toward the USAFA side of the stadium. A staff car with USAF General Officer flags flying was the main focus. All the cadets rose to attention, assuming that a high level USAF official was in the car. The Midshipmen rose in similar fashion out of respect for whoever was in the car. The passenger door opened, and first to come out were two men dressed in USAFA capes and caps, followed quickly by USNA's Bill the Goat, after which the supposed cadets threw off their outer capes/caps exposing their goat-handler sweaters.

Bill the Goat was successfully abducted again in 1990.

After a daring kidnapping in 1991 of West Point's four mules by 17 Navy midshipmen and two active-duty SEAL “advisers”, which involved cutting phone lines and tying up six Army employees, which caused the Army to scramble helicopters, mascot stealing was forbidden by an official high-level formal agreement in 1992.

On November 5, 1995, a month before the Army-Navy football game, a group of seniors from the USMA staged a pre-dawn raid on the Naval Academy Dairy Farm in Gambrills, Maryland and kidnapped Bill the Goat XXVI, XXVIII, and XXIX. The Pentagon was notified, and the three goats were returned under a policy forged by flag officers of the Army and Navy that stipulates that the "kidnapping of cadets, midshipmen or mascots will not be tolerated".

However, the truce was broken in 2002, when Army cadets kidnapped the Navy mascot from the Dairy Farm during a Veterans Day weekend, wearing Grateful Dead T-shirts as a disguise. After residing in a Pennsylvania farm, the Angora goat was returned.

On November 17, 2007, cadets from the USMA raided the Naval Academy Dairy Farm and kidnapped Bill XXXII, Bill XXXIII, and Bill XXXIV prior to an upcoming Army–Navy football game. The operation was named "Operation Good Shepherd" according to a Naval Academy spokesman. The goatnappers created a video showing the planning and actual goatnapping, and then posted it on YouTube.

On November 24, 2012, a passerby spotted an Angora goat tied up near the Pentagon in a median at an intersection on Army Navy Drive in Arlington County, Virginia. Representatives of the Animal Welfare League of Arlington rescued the ruminant and took it to the League's animal shelter. Calls were then placed to law enforcement officials in Anne Arundel County, Maryland, who notified the caprine's presumptive owners that their property had been found and needed a ride back home. The manager of Maryland Sunrise Farm (the successor to the Naval Academy Dairy Farm), where Bill XXXIII and Bill XXXIV usually resided, then claimed and retrieved the beast, which was in good condition, but did not know which Bill was absent from the farm. A Navy spokeswoman said, “At this time, we are unaware of who may have taken the goat, but it could be related to the Army-Navy game Dec. 8.” A spokesman for the USMA stated that he had "no official knowledge" of any theft of a goat. No charges were filed because it was unclear as to who had tied and abandoned the animal in the median.

In 2015 Army cadets tried unsuccessfully to grab Bill in a parking lot, during which Bill was injured and needed to stay in a veterinary clinic for a week.

In November 2021 Army cadets from the United States Military Academy at West Point tried to steal Bill the Goat XXXVII from a paddock on a private farm near Annapolis, where he was living with other goats. The noisy attempt spooked the goats and the cadets were able only to grab only one goat, the retired 14 year old Bill the Goat XXXIV who had only one horn, which meant that any gloating was rather muted. The kidnapped Bill was returned and found to be in good health.

== Costumed mascot ==
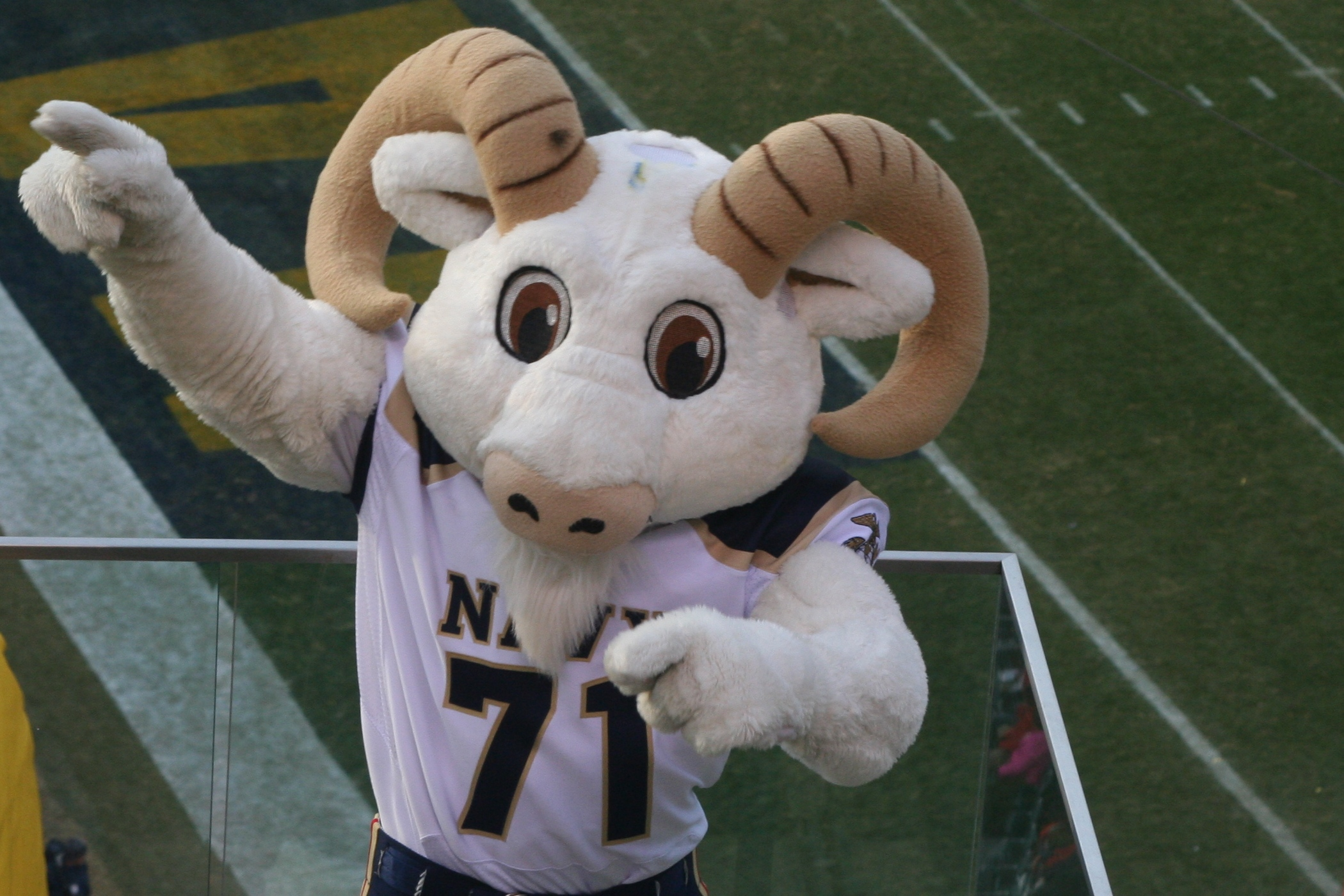
Bill the Goat, the human version, at the 2008 Army–Navy Game.

In addition to the live Bill goats, a costumed mascot also attends the United States Naval Academy football games. The live Bill goats rarely travel far from the Naval Academy, so the costumed mascot makes these trips solo.

The costumed mascot is sponsored by the Class of 1971; for this reason he wears the number 71 on his jersey.

== Team Bill ==
Team Bill is a group of midshipmen from the United States Naval Academy who volunteer to take care of the Bill goats and to transport them to and from events. Currently there are two Bill goats being cared for by the midshipmen at a dairy farm in Gambrills, Maryland. Team Bill accepted the delivery of Bill XXXIII and Bill XXXIV on May 5, 2007.

== See also ==
- List of U.S. college mascots
- Military mascot
