= Howard County Hunt Club =

- Location within Maryland
- 39°16′04.1″N 76°58′56.7″W
- Nearest city: Glenelg, Maryland

History
- Built: 19th century, est 1858

Site notes
- Area: 13400 Triadelphia Rd
- Architectural style: Romanesque

Howard County Hunt Club is a historic property located in Glenelg, Maryland in Howard County, Maryland, United States.

The property was part of 148 acres of land grants called “Dorsey's Grove" and "Benjamin's Addition" owned by Billingslea purchased by John W.H. Cullam of Baltimore in 1858 while slavery was still in wide use in the area. It was later considered located in the town of Isaacsville, Maryland. In 1882 it was owned by Joeseph Hobbs Peddicord and resold to Nicholas A Selby. Selby sold off 103 acres to Louis A and Helen Lambert. In 1897 the land was sold again to Josephine B. and Issac H. Iglehart. William T. Iglehart purchased the property in 1900.

A wood framed, L-shaped house was built onsite. The Howard County Hunt Club relocated from the Burleigh Manor tenant house and purchased the historic house and 102 acre grounds in 1931 for Fox hunting, meetings, operations, kennels and horse ring. A three by four bay wooden barn was also onsite. A Corn crib was lost to fire in the 1970s. The club relocated in 1997.

The Howard County Public School System demolished the historic residence to construct Triadelphia Ridge Elementary school and the adjacent Folly Quarter Middle School.

== See also ==
- List of Howard County properties in the Maryland Historical Trust
