= Gray Rock (Ellicott City, Maryland) =

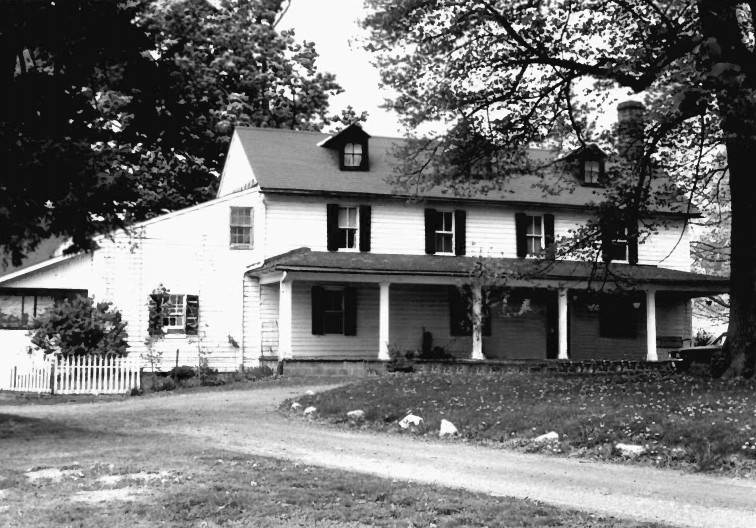
- Interactive map of the Gray Rock area

General information
- Type: House
- Location: Ellicott City, Maryland
- Coordinates: 39°16′2″N 76°51′26″W
- Construction started: 1813

Gray Rock is a historic plantation home located in Ellicott City, Maryland.

== History ==
Gray Rock (also called Grey Rock) is situated next to Font Hill Manor, a plantation house built in the 1700s by Admiral Hammond. Caleb Dorsey of Belmont had three sons. Thomas Beale Dorsey, became the Attorney General of Maryland, and later assembled the farm at age 55 in order to be closer to his other two brothers. The farm was created in 1813 from many tracts of land including, Pinkstone's Delight, Fifth Edition, Ben's luck, Rebecca's Lot, Gaither's Adventure-Ferry Bridge. In 1816 Freeborns Progress-Smith's Fortune and Addition to Freeborns Progress were added. In 1817, Ben's Delight, John's Luck, The Triangle, and Kelly's Neglect were assembled.

The home is a four-bay by one-bay wooden structure standing two and a half stories tall based on a clapboard-covered log home that predates the 1813 purchases. An additional 1 1/2-story stone house is on the property that served as quarters for two families. The property also included several large wooden barns and a carriage house. The farm was situated along the Baltimore-Frederick turnpike road. It is now surrounded by a residential cul-de-sac at 3518 Angus Valley Trail.

Thomas Beale Dorsey of Thomas died at Gray Rock on September 6, 1828, at the age of 60. The property passed to his daughter Sarah and her husband Dr. Arthur Pue in 1837 after the death of her mother Achsah Dorsey. (Pue was the family doctor to Peter Gorman and their son, Senator Arthur Pue Gorman). On May 7, 1848, the farm was inherited by their son Thomas Beale Dorsey Pue. In 1859, his father sold the 404-acre farm to James Mackubin for $32,000 (~$892,302 in 2024). In 1879, John H Herbert claimed a crop of 523 and 1000 bushels of Fultz wheat from two of Gray Rock's fields. In 1867, 43 acres were split off to Mackubbin where the MacAlpine Manor was built. The property was sold and leased back to MacKubbin until his death in 1904 when it was sold to the Sloatfield family finalized in 1911.

On May 14, 1943, former Howard County Commissioner Charles E. Miller purchased the farm and farmed it until 1980. The Miller Land Company was established in 1964 to develop the land. The property was subdivided into 300 acres, several small plots, a plot donated to the library, and a 50-acre section that he planned to donate for a hospital. In 1974, the government denied permission to build a hospital and the Grey Rock Community, Inc. was formed to carry on the mission to donate the land to help the community. Upon Charles Miller's death in 1979, Paul L. Miller became its president.

During the 1980s and 1990s, the Gray Rock Farm community was built. The access road to the farm became Gray Rock Drive. Other streets were laid and 250 homes were built on half acre lots.

In 2002, Grey Rock Community, Inc. found a partner to build a retirement community on the 50-acre plot and the Miller land was donated to the effort. Carroll Lutheran Village at Westminster, MD was the partner in establishing the community. In 2016, they opened a Continuing Care Retirement Community (CCRC) that provides independent living in apartments and homes, assisted living, and nursing care. In 2020, the Lutheran Village at Miller's Grant had 350 residents and 150 employees.

That completed the distribution of the Miller property, culminating in the Gray Rock Farm community and donation of land to the Miller Library, the First Lutheran church, and the Lutheran Village at Miller's Grant retirement community.
