= Rezin Hammond =

American revolutionary and plantation owner (1745–1809)

Colonel Rezin Hammond
- Born: 1745; Anne Arundel County, Maryland
- Died: September 1, 1809 (aged 63–64); Anne Arundel County, Maryland
- Burial place: Howard's Adventure
- Military career
- Allegiance: United States
- Branch: Anne Arundel County Militia
- Service years: 1774–1795
- Rank: Colonel
- Unit: Severn Battalion
- Known for: Burning of the Peggy Stewart, or the "Annapolis Tea Party"

Colonel Rezin Hammond (1745–1809) was a United States revolutionary patriot and politician from Anne Arundel County, Maryland. He represented his county as a delegate at the Maryland Convention and later in the Maryland House of Delegates. Hammond served as a Colonel in the Anne Arundel County Militia during the American Revolution, and was known for his radical revolutionary views. He advocated publicly for extending voting privileges to all free men, regardless of their landholdings. Despite his progressive stance on voting rights, Hammond was a wealthy plantation owner who owned slaves.

== Biography ==
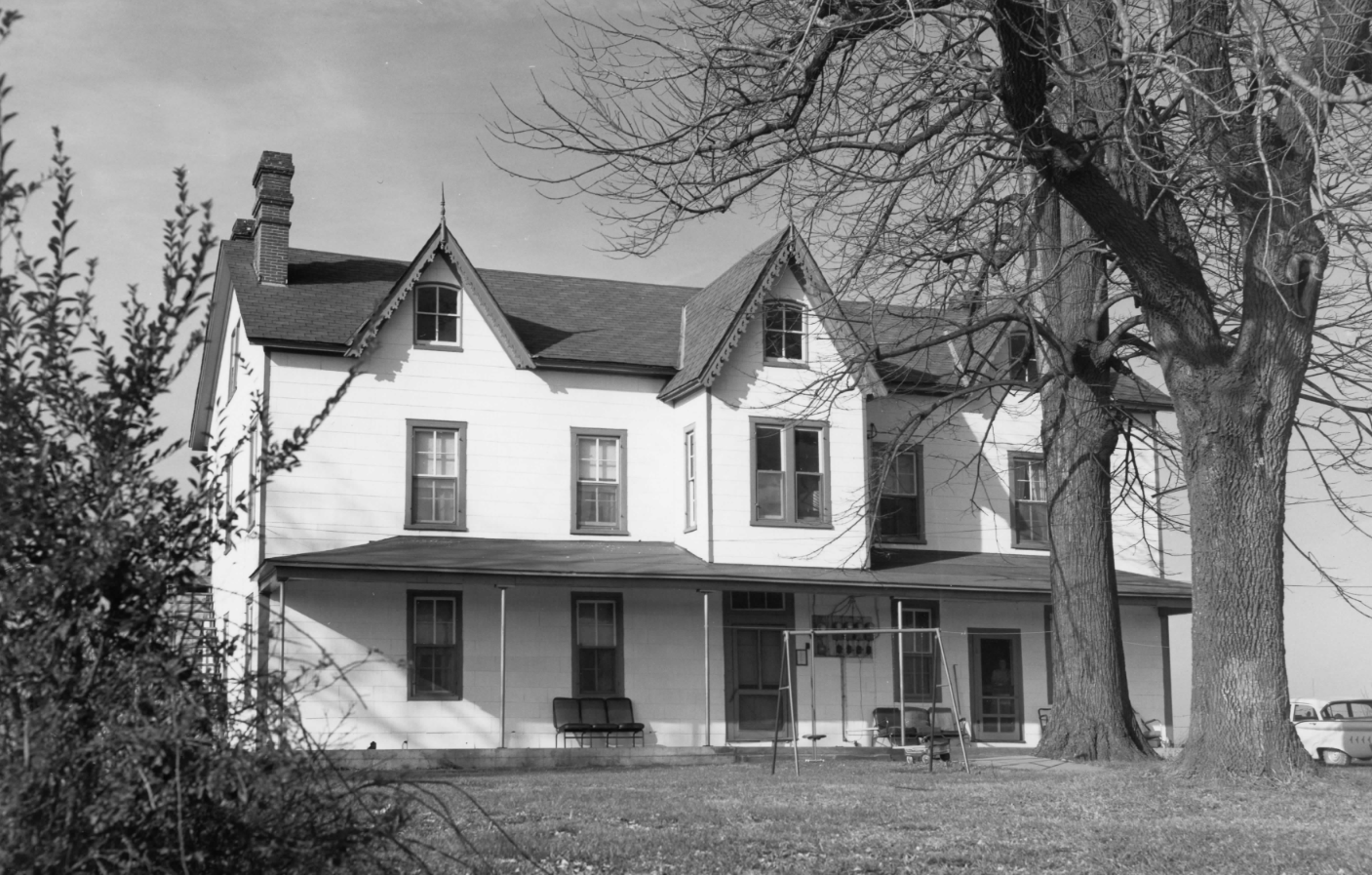
Howard's Adventure, childhood home of Rezin Hammond in Gambrills, Maryland

Rezin Hammond was born into a politically influential family at Howard's Adventure, their country home near Gambrills, Maryland. He was one of nine children born to Major Philip Hammond (1697–1760) and Rachel Brice Hammond (1711–1786). His maternal grandfather, John Brice Jr., was one of Maryland's largest landowners, and Rezin was named after his paternal uncle. He would grow to be very close with his brother Mathias Hammond (1740–1786).

Following in his father's footsteps, Hammond became a planter and politician, representing the fourth generation of his family to enter politics. He would be elected to the 1st, 2nd, 3rd, 4th, 5th, and 9th sessions of the Maryland Conventions, and took part in Maryland's constitutional convention. Hammond later served in the Maryland House of Delegates for Anne Arundel County before resigning during the third session. As a politician, he was known for his opposition to English power and his advocacy for democratic reforms. From 1783 to 1785, he served as the commissioner of tax.

=== Revolutionary activities ===
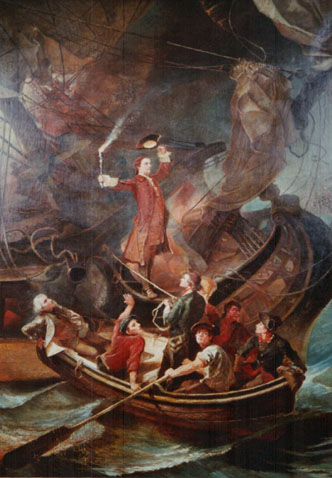
Rendering of the Burning of the Peggy Stewart by Francis Blackwell Mayer

Rezin Hammond, along with his brother Mathias, became deeply involved in radical revolutionary politics. He served in the Anne Arundel County Militia and on the Annapolis Committee of Safety and Committee of Correspondence. An early advocate for independence, Hammond strongly opposed British taxation. In 1774, the Hammond brothers led Anne Arundel County radicals in denouncing the owners of the Peggy Stewart for violating the boycott on tea imports following the Tea Act of 1773. Their efforts culminated in a public meeting that led to the burning of the ship and its contents in Annapolis harbor. Hammond personally boarded the ship to set it alight.

Hammond was appointed lieutenant colonel for the Severn Battalion in 1776, and rose to the rank of colonel by 1795. He actively fought against the British during the Revolutionary War, and was highly regarded among Maryland revolutionaries: Colonel Edward Gaither of the Elk Ridge battalion bequeathed Hammond a horse and a sword in his will. He was described as leading a "little warrior band" during the Revolutionary War, and had a sincere attachment to American independence.

At the Maryland Convention, Hammond led a radical faction alongside John Hall, known as the Hall-Hammond faction. They advocated for voting rights for all free taxpayers, regardless of property holdings. This stance was controversial, especially given Hammond's status as heir to one of Maryland's largest landowners. On August 15, 1776, an essay titled "Watchman" appeared in the Maryland Gazette arguing for universal male suffrage, which has been attributed to Hammond.

"Every poor man has a life, a personal liberty, and a right to his earnings: and is in danger of being injured by government in a variety of ways: therefore it is necessary that these people should enjoy the right of voting for representatives, to be the protectors of their lives, personal liberty, and their little property which, though small, is yet, upon the whole, a very great object to them."

— attributed to Rezin Hammond, "Watchman", Maryland Gazette, August 15, 1776

The essay, and the popular support behind it, had a significant impact on the convention. While property holdings remained a prerequisite for voting, the requirement was lowered and the holding of multiple offices was prohibited.

=== Assassination attempt ===
On April 25, 1791, Hammond survived an assassination attempt by Elijah Gaither, who had come to Hammond's home with two pistols and a gun. One of Hammond's slaves saved his life during the assault, and the assailant fled. Governor of Maryland John Eager Howard issued a proclamation in the Maryland Gazette for Gaither's apprehension, and Hammond offered a substantial reward of four hundred dollars for his capture.

=== Slave holdings ===
Despite his progressive views on voting rights, Hammond was a substantial slaveholder, who owned and used slaves to tend his vast property holdings. He inherited 12 slaves from his father's estate in 1760, which increased to 72 slaves in 1783, and by 1798, he had become the second-largest slaveholder in the county. In 1794, he sent two slaves named Ben and Will to work several months at the Northampton Iron Works to "improve their obedience" and remove them from their connections. He is known to have freed several slaves during his lifetime, among them "Negro Moses" who would later be employed at the Maryland State House.

At the time of Hammond's death, he owned 166 slaves, over 14,000 acres of property, and a law library. Although he provided for the manumission of his slaves in his will, this request was not honored by his heirs, and it took some of his former slaves decades to win their freedom.

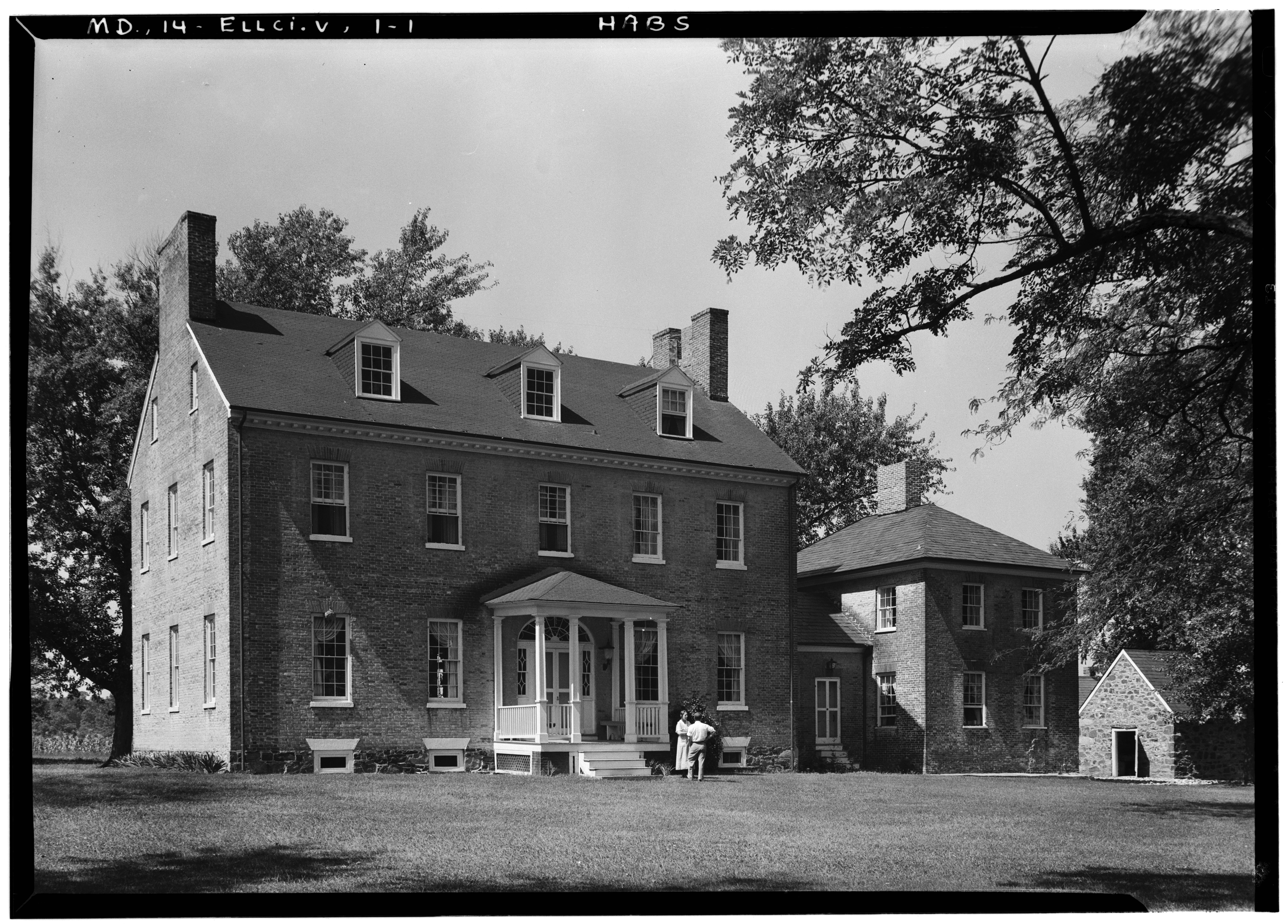
Burleigh Manor pictured in 1936

=== Burleigh Manor ===
In the late 1790s and early 1800s, Hammond built Burleigh Manor, also known as "Hammonds Inheritance" in Ellicott City, Howard County, Maryland. The property, built on a 2,300-acre (930 ha) estate, is now listed on the National Register of Historic Places in Maryland. The house is fifteen miles west of Baltimore, Maryland. According to local folklore, the house was built for a prospective bride and family, which never took up residence. Hammond would share the home with his nephews and their families.

=== Death ===
Hammond never married, and died on September 1, 1809, at the age of 65. He was buried in the family plot at Howard's Adventure. His obituary characterized him as an "inflexible friend" and "upright citizen". His substantial property holdings were distributed among his nephews, Denton Hammond and Matthias Hammond, and provisions were made for thirty-two of his former slaves in his will, which included land, weapons, horses and tools.
