= Lilburne =

Lilburne is a surname. Notable people with the surname include:

- Cyril Lilburne (1902–1985), Australian footballer
- Elizabeth Lilburne (fl. 1641–1660), English political agitator; wife of John Lilburne
- George Lilburne (c. 1585–1666), English merchant
- Herb Lilburne (1908–1976), New Zealand rugby union and rugby league footballer
- John Lilburne (1614–1657), English political agitator
- Paul Lilburne, Australian politician
- Robert Lilburne (1613–1665), English soldier and regicide; brother of John Lilburne
- Thomas Lilburne (died 1665), English politician

== See also ==
- Lilburne River, New Zealand
