= Lilburn, Virginia =

Lilburn
- unincorporated community
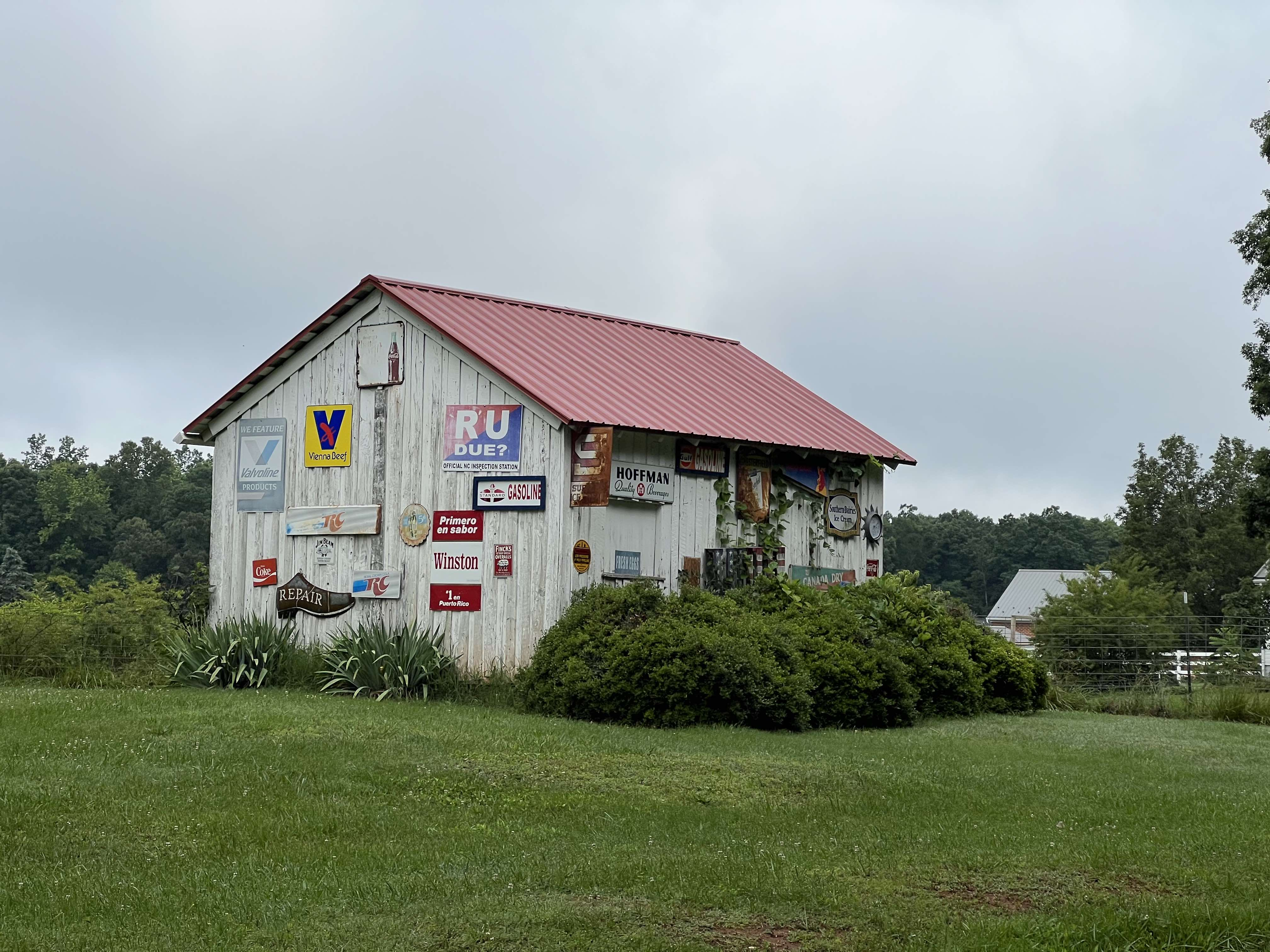
- A barn in Lilburn

- Location within the state of Virginia Lilburn (the United States)
- Coordinates: 37°31′19″N 77°50′22″W
- Country: United States
- State: Virginia
- County: Powhatan
- Time zone: UTC−5 (Eastern (EST))
  - Summer (DST): UTC−4 (EDT)
- GNIS feature ID: 1674222

Lilburn is an unincorporated community in Powhatan County, in the U.S. state of Virginia.
