= Charles E. Miller =

American politician and businessperson (1903–1979)

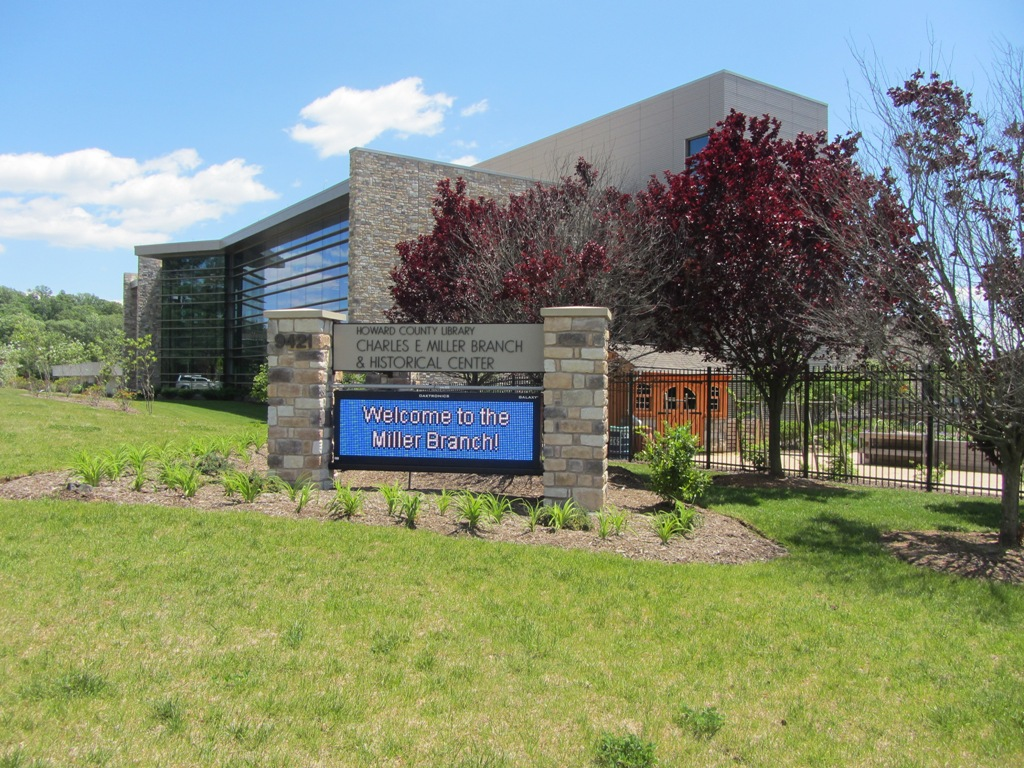
- Charles E. Miller Library
- Born: 1902
- Died: 9 July 1979 (aged 76–77); Howard County General Hospital
- Occupation: Businessman
- Known for: Foundation of Columbia, Maryland
- Political party: Republican
- Board member of: Howard County Commissioner
- Spouse: Grace E.
- Children: 2

Charles E. Miller (1902–1979) was an American politician and businessman in Howard County, Maryland

== Early life ==
Charles Miller started as a Magistrate in Ellicott City, Maryland. Miller was a County Commissioner from 1938 to 1949. Miller served on the Howard County Board of Education starting in 1950, becoming the president of the board in 1954 and serving until 1962. Miller operated Howard County's last segregated school district, phasing out the practice over an 11-year plan.

== Land donations ==
Miller co-owned land outside Ellicott City with Benjamin Mellor, an insurance broker to the school board from the firm Herrman and Car. Both donated 8 acres of land they had already rented to farmer to build the Ellicott City High School on the condition the school system repay his renter for the lost crops. His tenant, E.W. Hardman asked for $700, a steep price for alfalfa crops in January at the end of the depression. The School board offered him half the amount, and he refused the offer.

In 1952, Miller donated $1,000 for the purchase of land for a new Ellicott City colored school. Miller recommended the Nellie Denhart property on Fels Lane, and contributed another $2,000 toward the project and approved the purchase. At Ellicott City High, 12 additional acres were purchased from Dorothy Marie Gaither for $5,000 with Miller contributing $2,500 for the land and demolition of the "colored house and corn crib" on the property. At the same time, her husband, Robert Lee Gaither bought the property of the recently burnt down Dayton school from the school board auction run by Miller for $750.

In 1956, Miller donated land on Chatham Road to relocate the First Evangelical Lutheran Church from its 1874 structure, which was sold to be converted to a private residence.

In 1959, Miller donated the land to Howard County for the county's first library. The present library was named the Charles E. Miller Branch in his honor.

In 1966, Ellicott City farm owner, Senator Clark proposed an independent parkland commission for Howard County. Miller opposed the legislation, starting a referendum against the measure. A 1972 bill approved by Miller allowed the council on which he sat to veto county purchases of parkland, including a project to create a county park that was proposed to overlay his own property. The legislation created during the political battle over parkland and land-use shaped the creation of the current Howard County Department of Parks & Recreation.

In 1970, Miller purchased the historic mansion Mount Ida in Ellicott City to keep it from being torn down for development. He was granted permission to restore it and sell it as office space.

In 1974 Miller requested that the 405 acre Gray Rock property he owned since 1945 be rezoned for development. The effort to raze the historic 1813 farmhouse "Gray Rock" and slave quarters of Thomas Beale Dorsey and subdivide the land did not get approval. In 1975 Miller proposed to build a 200 unit five-story Lutheran hospital. The hospital would have been in competition with the newly constructed Howard County General Hospital. New legislation was passed requiring hospitals to be in commercial zoned land. In 1977 Miller offered to donate $3 million to the Lutheran hospital with income generated from the approval to build a 325-unit subdivision on the remainder of his Gray Rock land. In 2006, Gray Rock was rezoned and donated for the 216 unit Lutheran Village at Miller's Grant managed by Carroll Lutheran Village. Construction of the $140 million facility broke ground in 2014 after increasing the density to 276 units.

== Councilman ==
In 1938 Miller was added to the Board of Commissioners in Howard County following the death of Hart B. Noll. where he stayed in office through 1949.

In 1962 Miller became chairman of the first all-GOP Board of Commissioners. In 1965 State Senator James A. Clark, Jr. proposed a five-person County Council and a County Executive which Miller opposed. Following delays in low-profit parkland approval projects, Clark formed a state-managed commission to fund and purchase parkland for the county, targeting a Miller-owned property he had self-approved for development. Miller countered by creating a central Public Works Department to manage parks within the county. In 1966, Miller lost his bid for council, but was reappointed in November to fill the seat of David W. Force, who died of a brain tumor after winning the election.

As a Councilman, in 1968, Miller approved the construction of the $3.2 million Howard Community College. Miller proposed bills in 1972 that would disallow performances of entertainers with a past history of violence in large venues. In 1973, Concilman Edward L. Cochran queried executive Omar J. Jones and Miller for appointing Robert Wieder as county solicitor. Wieder was also working as a CPA for Miller.

=== The Columbia Project ===
In 1962, Miller ran again for County Commissioner on a no-growth platform against Howard County's first woman candidate Doris Stromberg Thompson, daughter of newspaperman Paul Griffith Stromberg. Miller's GOP platform won all three seats. The same year Miller appointed future Rouse lawyer, Lewis S. Nippard as legal counsel for the county. Miller would appoint Nippard to a five-person commission in 1964 to draft a proposal to convert Howard County to a powerful charter form of government. In 1965 Miller was one of three county commissioners that approved the zoning exceptions proposed by Howard Research and Development in 1965 to create the planned community of Columbia, Maryland. In 1974, Miller claimed he was solicited by James Rouse and Micheal D Spear to increase the density of Columbia zoning because of economic problems the project was facing. Miller told reporters that "economic problems come from bad management".

== School Board ==
Miller was an associate of the school board. In 1953, he became part of a two-man team to choose land purchases for school sites and donated $5,000 to build the new Senior Howard High School.

== Businessman ==
In 1927, Miller founded Miller Chevrolet Sales and Service in an Elkridge livery stable with 125 car sales his first year. He relocated to the Green-Cross Garage in Ellicott City in 1928. In 1938 the county closed many single-room schoolhouses and, using WPA money, built consolidated schools requiring bus service. Miller operated a school bus contracting service and serviced and exchanged vehicles for the county school system, the board of which he would become a member of. By 1968, he placed his son Paul as president and Donald as secretary of the auto dealership at a new location on Route 40. In 1972, he ended an eight-year service contract selling gas to Howard County's animal control vehicle fleet and driver's education cars.

Miller also owned his own land development company, the Miller Land Company which developed properties throughout Howard County. He also owned an interest in the Howard County Central News firm.

A lifetime resident of Howard County, Miller died in 1979 from a heart attack at Howard County General Hospital.

== Legacy and honors ==
Miller has several places named in his honor including the Charles E. Miller Branch Library & Historical Center in Ellicott City.
