= MacAlpine (house) =

Historic house in Maryland, United States

- U.S. National Register of Historic Places
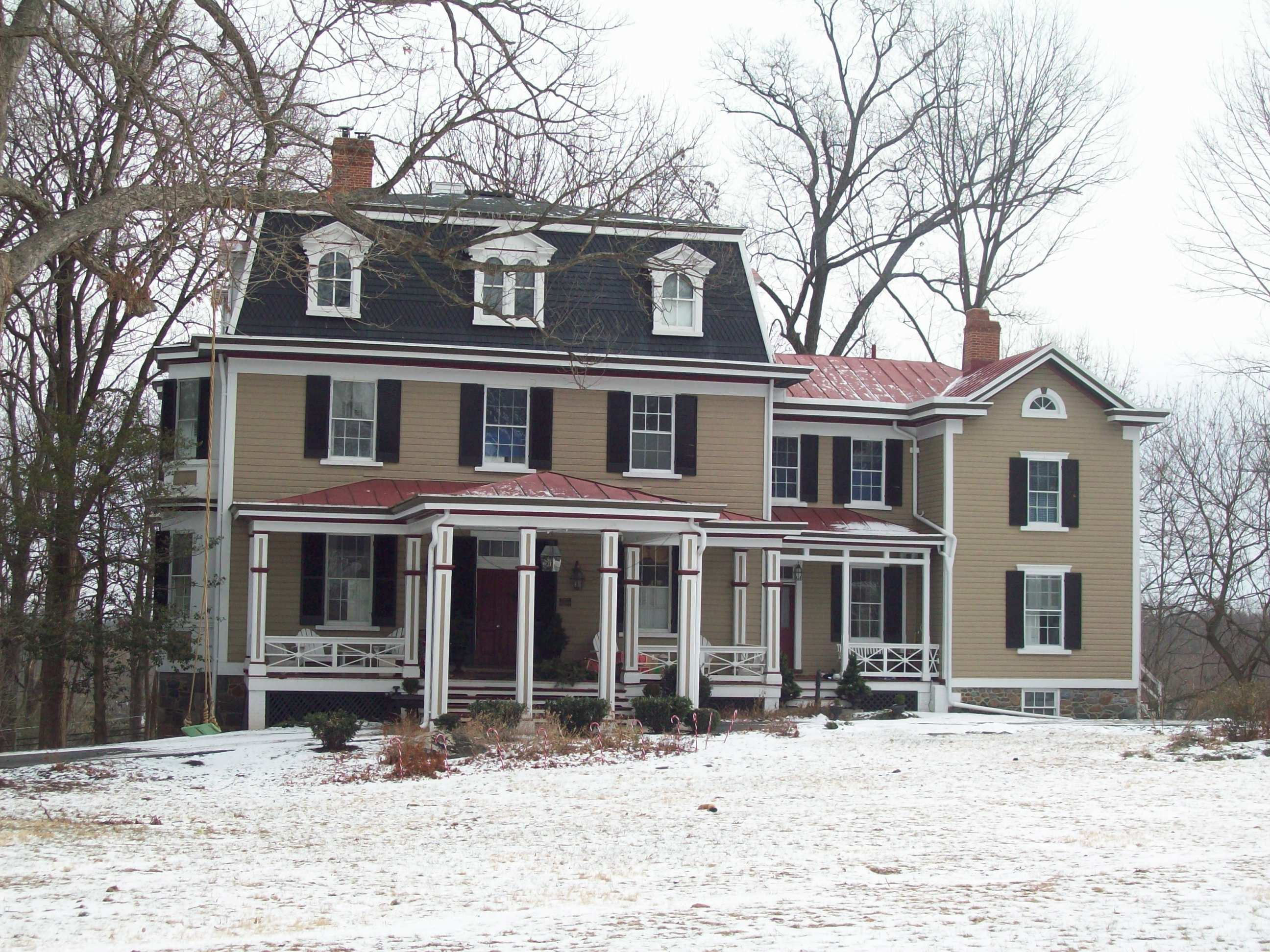
- MacAlpine, January 2011

- Location within Maryland Location within the United States
- Location: 3621 MacAlpine Road, Ellicott City, Maryland
- Coordinates: 39°16′14.7468″N 76°49′46.1892″W
- Area: 0.7 acres (0.28 ha)
- Built: 1868
- Architectural style: Second Empire
- NRHP reference No.: 04001382
- Added to NRHP: December 23, 2004

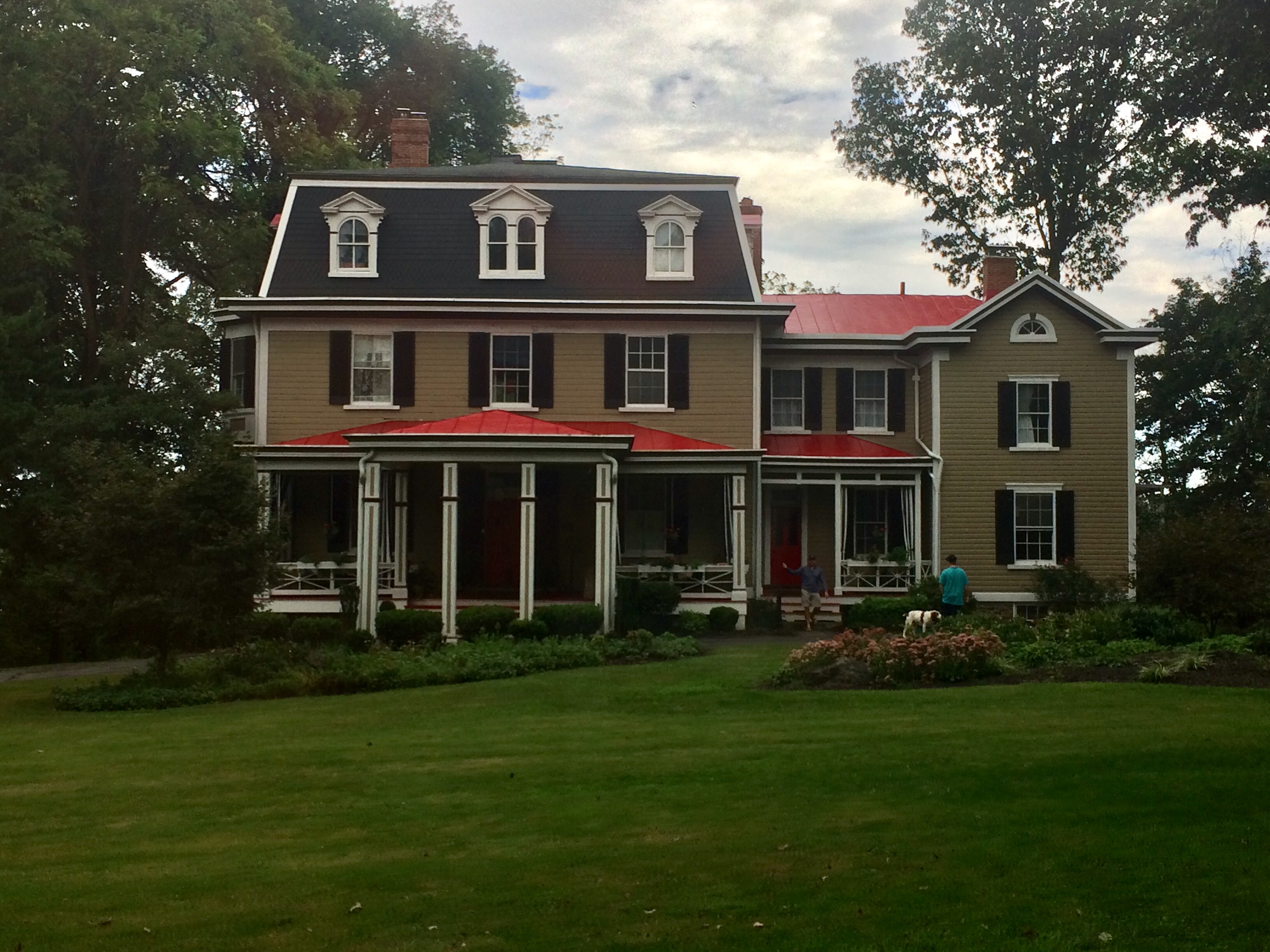
MacAlpine September 2018

MacAlpine, Rebecca's Lot is a historic home located at Ellicott City, Howard County, Maryland, United States. It was built by wealthy Baltimore attorney, James Mackubin, for his second wife, Gabriella Peter, a great-great-granddaughter of Martha Washington. She grew up at nearby Linwood, the daughter of Maj. George Washington Parke Custis Peter, who was the second son of Martha Parke Custis Peter of Tudor Place, Georgetown. She attended the famed Patapsco Female Institute and was a leading society member in Maryland. She was a cousin of Robert E. Lee's wife and his children spent many summers here after his death. Gabriella was known to be gracious but demanding. She initially lived at nearby Grey Rock but refused to stay there long as her husband had shared that home with his first wife. Her daughters were unable to leave her side during her lifetime, especially after the accidental 1903 death of her youngest son, Parke Custis, rendering them middle-aged spinsters at the time of her death.

The Mackubins raised five children here:

1. Ella Mackubin (1870–1956): unmarried; graduated from Patapsco Female Institute in 1886
2. George Mackubin (1872–1964): married Maud Tayloe Perrin of Gloucester County, Virginia; He was the founder of McKubin & Company in 1899, now Legg Mason. Had issue: one son; two daughters (twins).
3. Parke Custis Mackubin (1873–1903): unmarried; killed in a logging accident on his farm on Kent Island, Eareckson Farm. Had issue: one son.
4. Emily Boyce Mackubin (1876–1946): unmarried; philanthropist.
5. Mildred Lee Mackubin (1878–1956): married Arthur Gordon (after Gabriella's death) but no children.

The property was sold after the death of Emily Mackubin in 1946 and subsequently subdivided into the present Dunloggin neighborhood. The family is buried at nearby St. John's Church where they were active members.

It is a 2 1/2-story, three-bay by two-bay frame, nineteen room structure clad in novelty siding with corner boards, with a mansard roof covered with wood shingles. When built in 1868, the house had a low hip roof possibly changed to reflect the new mansard style as at her father's summer home, Linwood. The stone slave quarters were built about 1840 reside several houses south of the MacApline house. The Mackubin's owned at least 11 slaves prior to the end of the civil war. These enslaved resided in the slave quarters after the civil war under the last name "Ireland," almost certainly bequeathed to them due to Mackubin's Irish heritage. Mrs Mackubin's cousin was the daughter of General Robert E. Lee

In 1947, land developer Marcus A Wakefield Jr. purchased the MacApline site subdividing the property for the Dunloggin neighborhood leaving four lots around the MacApline building. In 1974, the property was denied zoning to be converted to an antique store. The house was restored throughout the 1970s and 1980s by resident owners with the surrounding property reduced to less than an acre.

MacAlpine was listed on the National Register of Historic Places in 2004.

== See also ==
- Gray Rock Plantation
- Temora
- Bon Air Manor (Ellicott City, Maryland)
- Linwood Manor
