= Bon Air Manor (Ellicott City, Maryland) =

- Location within Maryland
- 39°15′00″N 76°48′00″W
- Location: 4445 Stonecrest Drive Ellicott City, Maryland

History
- Built: 1870

Site notes
- Architectural style: Romanesque

Bon Air Manor or Benson's Park is a historic plantation home in Ellicott City, Howard County, Maryland.

The Bon Air Manor is a historic gatehouse to the original Benson's Park Manor. Benson's Manor was a 250-acre parcel patented by Daniel Benson in 1696. The property was later expanded to 268 acres. The gatehouse was part of a complex of outbuildings including a barn, stone jail, and slave quarters built in 1805. The property adjacent to the New Cut Landfill has been subdivided for residential development and reduced in size.

The gatehouse remains privately owned.

== See also ==
- Lilburn (Ellicott City, Maryland)
