= Burleigh (Ellicott City, Maryland) =

Historic home in Maryland, United States

- U.S. National Register of Historic Places
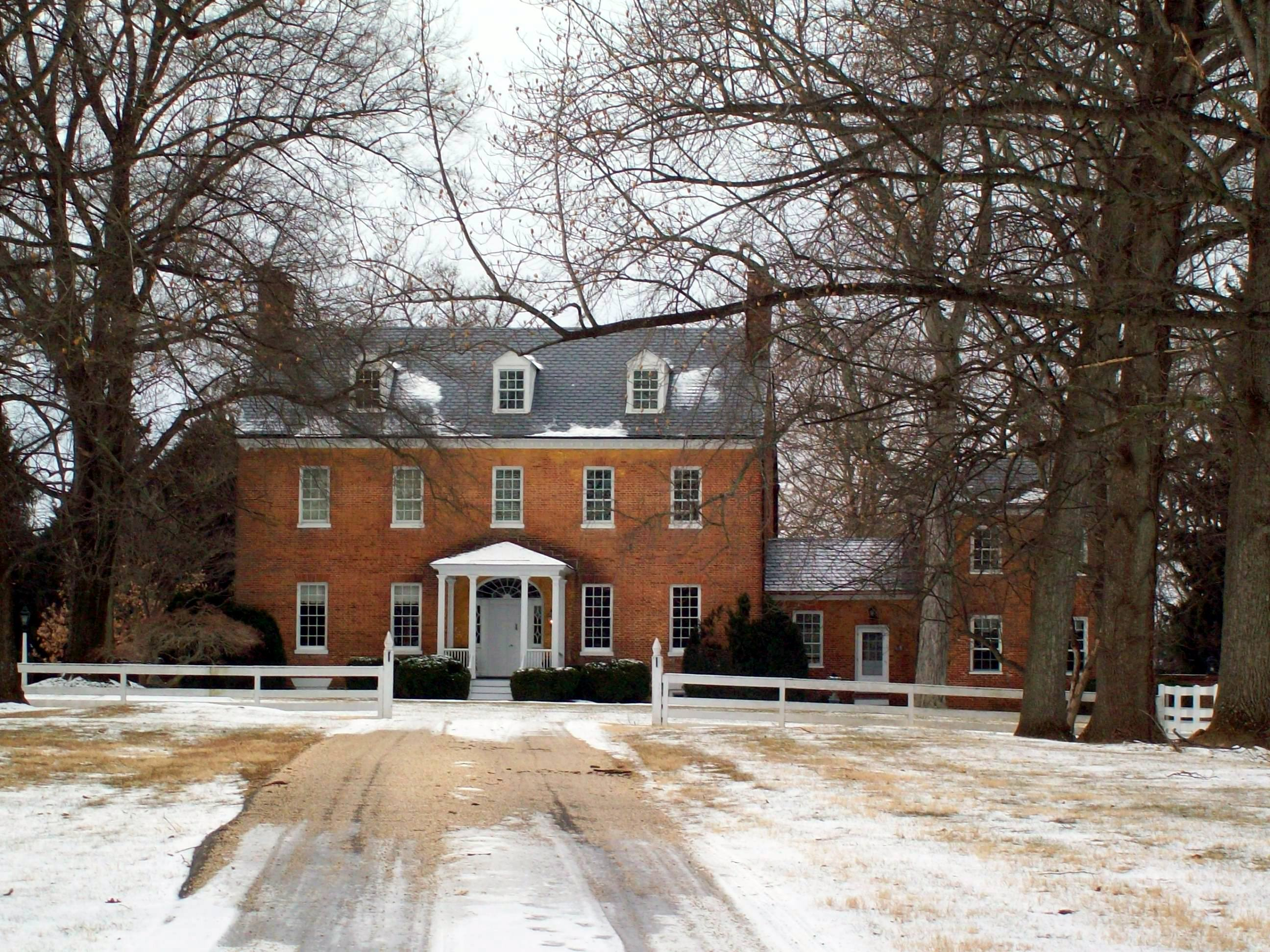
- Burleigh, January 2011

- Location within Maryland Location within the United States
- Location: 3950 White Rose Way, Ellicott City, Maryland
- Coordinates: 39°15′44.8884″N 76°52′4.3608″W
- Area: 0.2 acres (0.081 ha)
- Built: 1797
- Architect: Colonel Rezin Hammond
- Architectural style: Federal
- NRHP reference No.: 82001596
- Added to NRHP: November 30, 1982

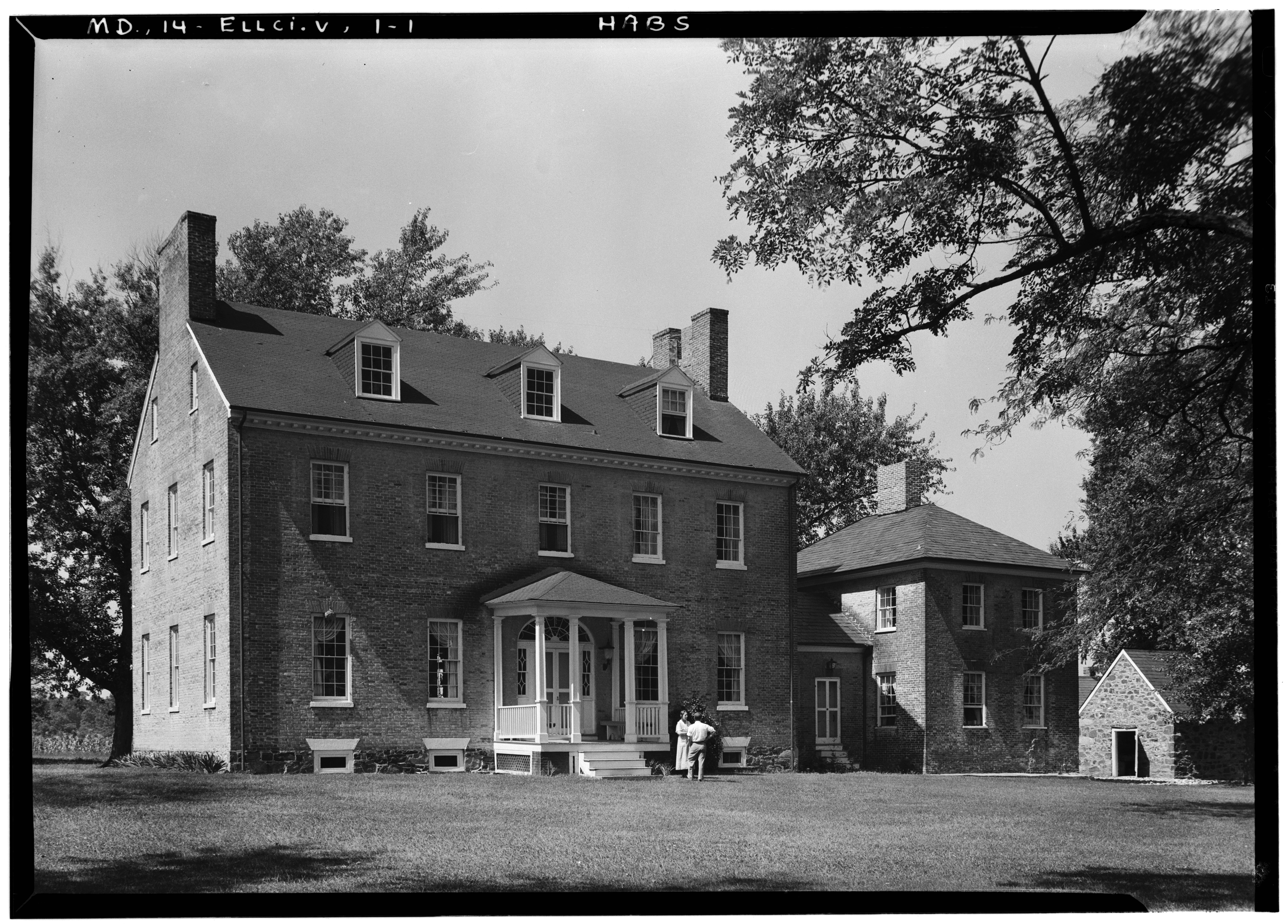
Bureigh in 1936

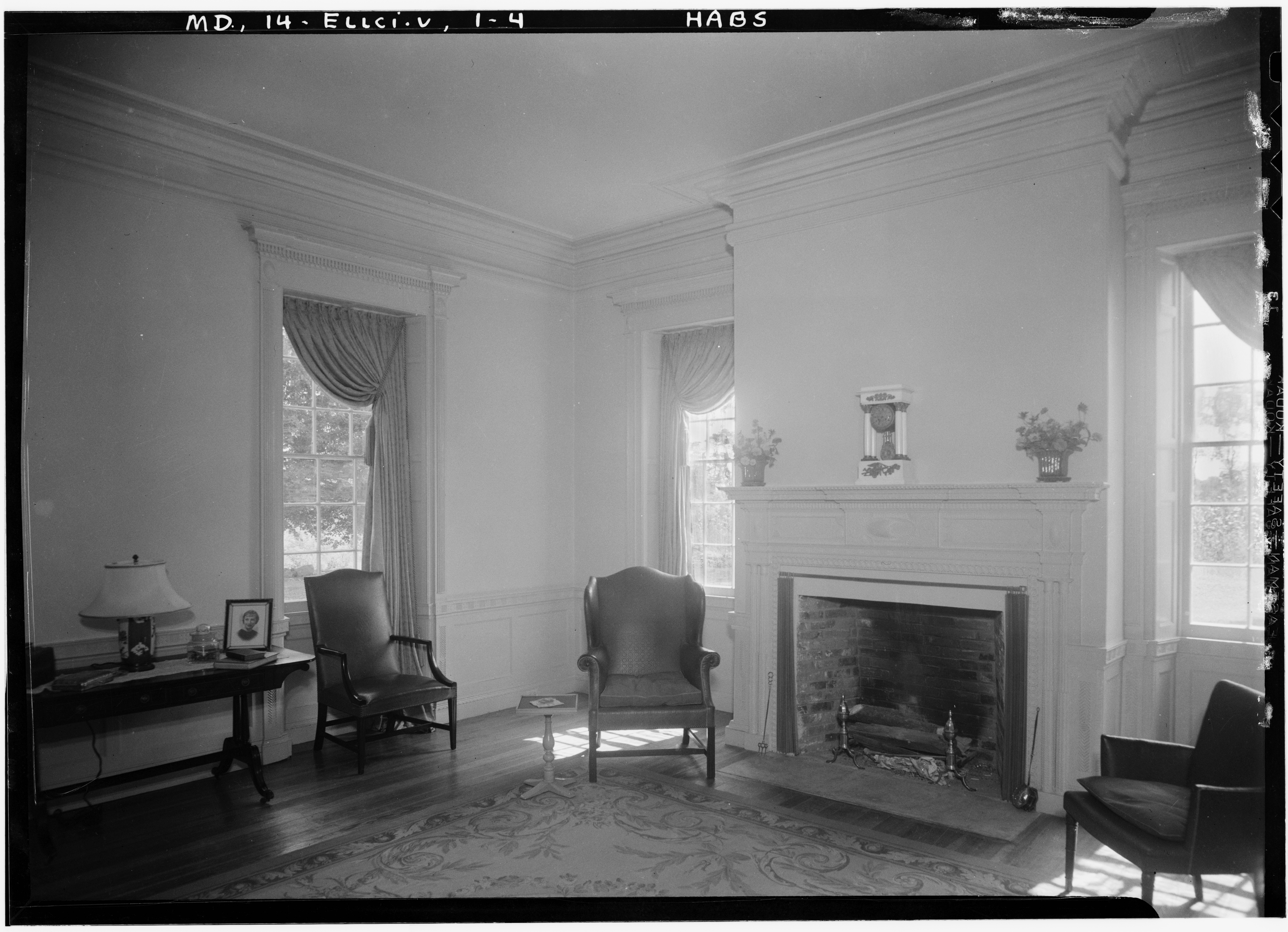
Drawing Room

Burleigh, also known as Burleigh Manor or Hammonds Inheritance, is a historic home located at Ellicott City, Maryland, United States, built on a 2,300-acre (930 ha) estate. It is a Federal-style brick dwelling built between 1797 and 1810, laid in Flemish bond. Based on the 1798 Tax assessment of the Elkridge Hundred, the original manor house started as a one-story frame building 24 by 18 foot in size. Also on the landscaped grounds are a 1720 stone smokehouse; a much-altered log, stone, and frame "gatehouse" or "cottage," built in 1820 as a workhouse for slaves and another log outbuilding, as well as an early-20th century bathhouse, 1941 swimming pool, and tennis court. Portions of the estate once included the old Annapolis Road which served the property until the construction of Centennial Lane to connect Clarksville to Ellicott City in 1876.

== Hammond family home ==
The manor was built by Colonel Rezin Hammond, using the same craftsmen as his brother Mathias Hammond's Hammond–Harwood House in Annapolis. Rezin and his brother Matthias were active in the colonial revolution with notable participation in the burning of the Peggy Stewart.

Burleigh's owner Rezin Hammond died in 1809. Hammond bequeathed the manor and 4,500 acres (1,800 ha) to his grandnephew Denton Hammond and his wife Sara Hall Baldwin who lived there until her death in 1832. All slave labor were offered manumission upon Rezin Hammond's death in 1809, with extra provisions for tools, land and livestock for thirty two slaves. Hammond's heirs did not fully honor his will's provision for manumission, and it would take some of his slaves many years before they could successfully argue for their freedom.

The estate was later passed to Denton Hammond's brother, Civil War veteran Colonel Mathias Hammond until his death where he was buried alongside other family members on the estate. His wife Mary Hanson Hammond and her daughter Mrs. Grace (Richard Craigh) Hammond maintained ownership afterward. In 1914, the estate had land totaling over 1,000 acres (400 ha) including the outbuildings and slave quarters. Grace Hammond died in 1928 and Burleigh Manor was sold after 125 years in the Hammond family.

== Post Hammond ownership ==
In 1935, the Estate was subdivided to 600 acres (240 ha) and purchased by Charles McAlpin Pyle, grandson of industrialist David Hunter McAlpin. The manor house was renovated with the great kitchen replaced by a "Stirrup Room" where meetings of the Howard County Hunt Club took place. The house was sold in 1941 to Mrs. Anthony J. Drexel Biddle, Jr. for the use of Prince Alexandre Hohenlohoe of Poland and his wife, Peggy Schulze during World War II. St. Timothy's School bought the property after the war in 1946, but abandoned plans and sold to George Dudley Iverson IV and his wife Juliet Proctor Goldsborough Iverson in 1950. Iverson embarked on an extensive restoration effort to return the house back to its colonial appearance. The brick was once painted yellow, but by 1956, had almost returned to exposed red brick. As of 2013, it has operated as a livestock shelter.

In November 1976 the county executive, Edward L. Cochran, commissioned a $35,000 survey by Resource Management Associates Inc. to analyze 600 acres (240 ha) of the manor property for a landfill site at a set contract price of $2,250,000, but a task force recommendation led to a site selection in Marriottsville. In 1979, a historical survey was conducted, listing the owner as Maple Lawn developer Stewart J Greenbaum. In 1982 Burleigh was listed on the National Register of Historic Places. In 1987, the wife of former County Executive Cochran listed Burleigh Manor and 15 surrounding acres for sale for $750,000.

In 1988, it was purchased for $565,000 by the Reynolds family who lived in the home until 2003.

In 2012, the home was purchased by the family of Dr Lisa M. Davis and Dr. Lawrence J. Cheskin. Today, the family manages a small animal sanctuary and "eco-retreat" at the site.

=== Middle school ===
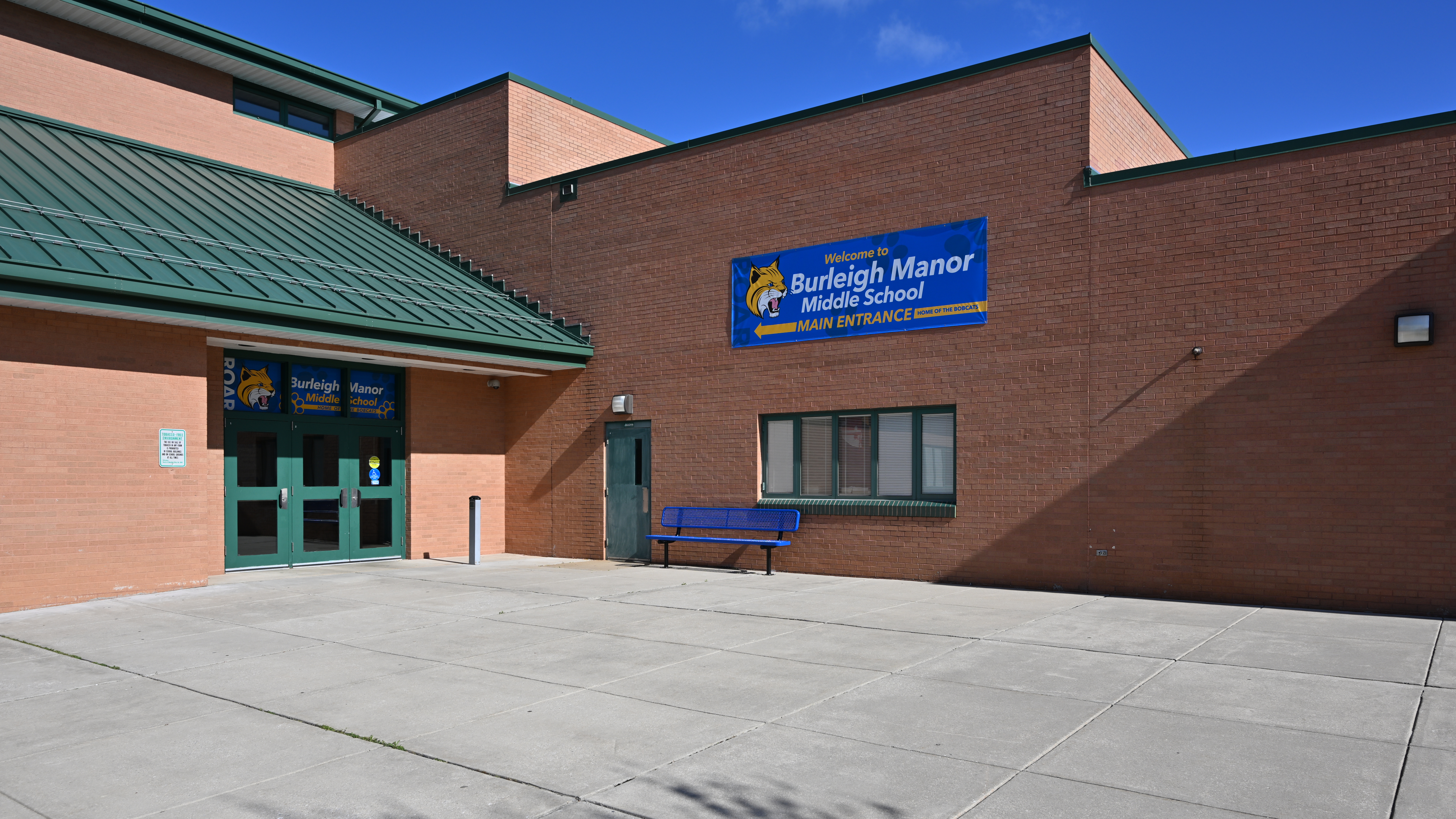
Burleigh Manor Middle School

In 1992, the Burleigh Manor Middle School was opened on the former grounds of Burleigh, with the school's name honoring the estate.

== See also ==
- List of Howard County properties in the Maryland Historical Trust
- Rezin Hammond, builder of Burleigh
