= List of Howard County properties in the Maryland Historical Trust =

The Maryland Historical Trust serves as the central historic preservation office in Maryland. The properties listed reside within the boundaries of modern Howard County. Prior to 1851, sites would have been part of Anne Arundel County. Sites settled prior to 1650 would have been part of St Mary's County in the Province of Maryland which was settled in 1632 by Europeans.

Maryland Historical Trust properties in Howard County:

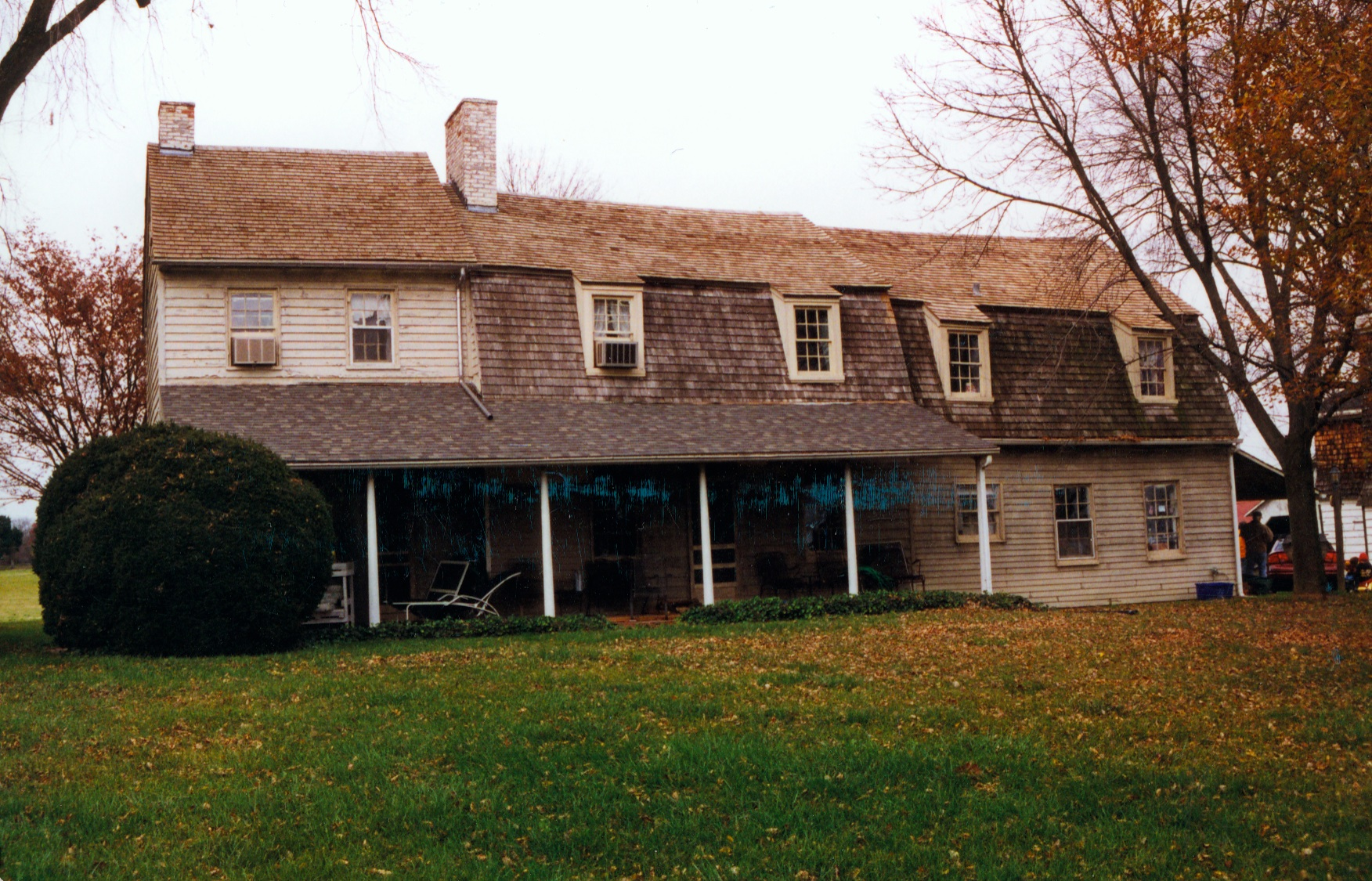
HO-1 Cherry Grove circa 1766

- HO-1, Cherry Grove, 2937 Jennings Chapel Road, Woodbine
- HO-2, Oakdale, 16449 Edwin Warfield Road, Woodbine
- HO-3, Pleasant Valley (Lost by Neglect), 13893 Forsythe Road, Cooksville
- HO-4, Red House Tavern, Hoods Mill Road (MD 97), Cooksville
- HO-5, Roberts Inn, 14610 Frederick Road (MD 144), Cooksville
- HO-6, Ellerslie, 2761 Roxbury Mills Road (MD 97), Cooksville
- HO-7, Union Chapel (St. Andrew's Episcopal Church), Roxbury Mills Road (MD 97), Glenwood
- HO-8, Longwood (The Dependency), 3188 Roxbury Mills Road (MD 97), Glenwood
- HO-9, Round About Hills (Peacefields), 15505 Cattail Oaks, Glenwood
- HO-10, Villa de Speranza (New Year's Gift), 3890 Roxbury Mills Road (MD 97), Glenwood
- HO-11, Duvall's Range (Stephen Boone Dorsey House), 15451 Roxbury Road, Glenwood
- HO-12, Roxbury Mill, Roxbury Mill Road, Brookeville
- HO-13, Howard Lodge (Taylor's Park), 12301 Howard Lodge Drive, Sykesville
- HO-14, Howard County Hunt Club, 13402 Triadelphia Road, Ellicott City
- HO-15, Glenelg Manor (Glenelg Country School), 12793 Folly Quarter Road, Glenelg
- HO-16, Folly Quarter Manor (McTavish House, Carrollton Hall), 12290 Folly Quarter Road, Ellicott City
- HO-17, Folly Quarter Farm (and Bath House), 4308 Folly Quarter Road, Ellicott City
- HO-18, Walnut Grove, 5192 Sheppard Lane, Clarksville
- HO-19, Huntington Farms, 13180 Brighton Dam Road, Clarksville
- HO-20, Hickory Ridge, 13032 Highland Road, Clarksville

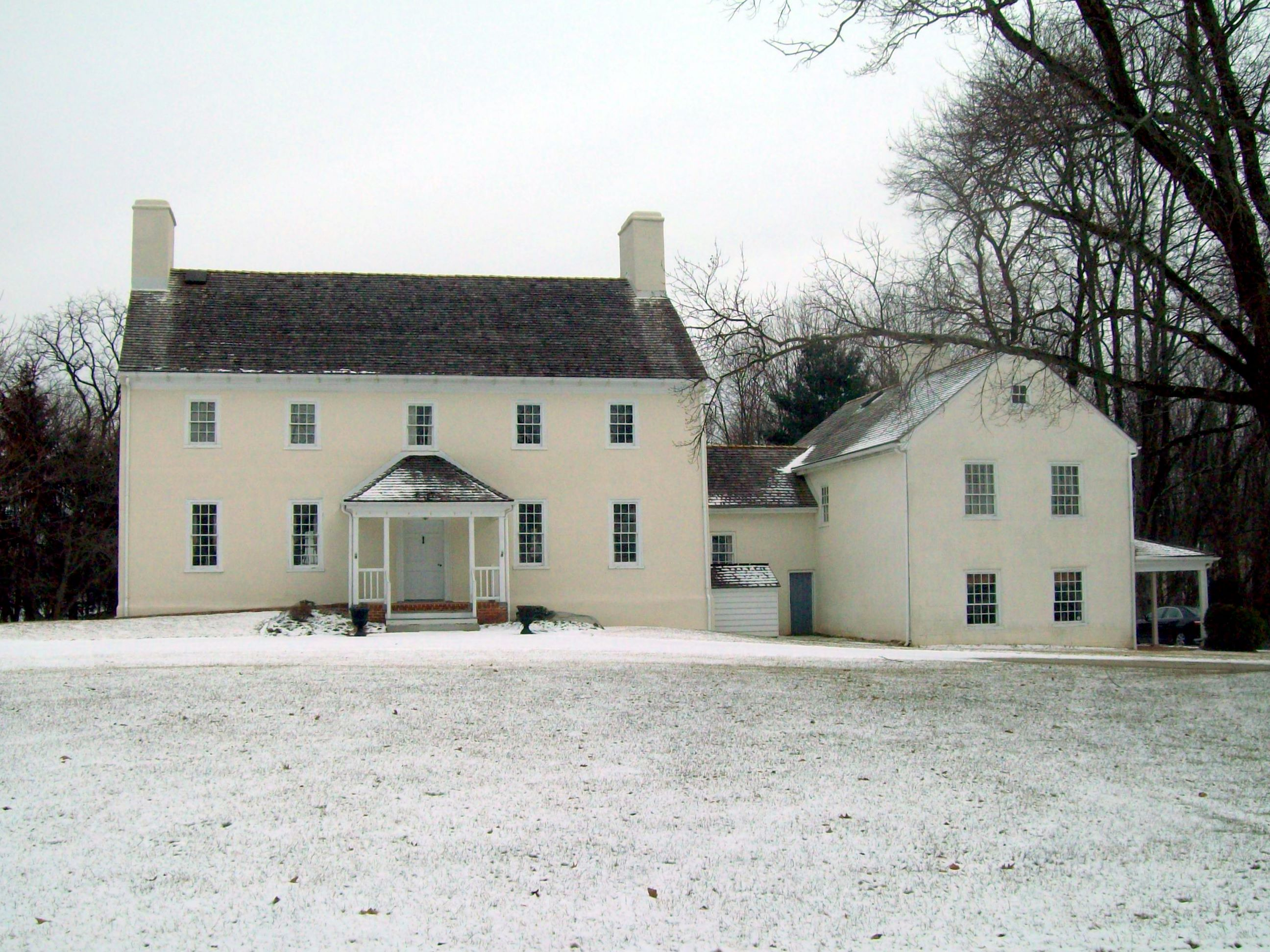
HO-21 Waverley circa 1756

- HO-21, Waverly, 2335 Waverly Mansion Drive, Marriottsville
- HO-22, Doughoregan Manor (Charles Carroll III of Carrollton House), 3500 Old Manor Lane, Ellicott City
- HO-23, Burleigh Manor and Gate House (Burleigh Cottage), 3950 White Rose Way, Ellicott City
- HO-24, Font Hill, 3838 Parrot Drive, Ellicott City
- HO-25, Brick House on the Pike (Brick House Farm, Ellerslie), 9564 National Pike (US 40), Ellicott City
- HO-26, St. John's Episcopal Church, 9130 Frederick Road (MD 144), Ellicott City
- HO-27, Daniels Mill (Elysville, Gary, Alberton Mill), Daniels Road, Ellicott
- HO-28, Dorsey Hall, 5100 Dorsey Hall Drive, Ellicott City
- HO-29, Arlington (Fairway Hills Golf Club), 5100 Columbia Road, Columbia
- HO-30, Woodlawn, Bendix Road (Formerly 9254 Old Annapolis Road, Columbia
- HO-31, Spring Hill and Quarters, 4659 Montgomery Road (MD 103) Also 4614 New Cut Road, Ellicott City
- HO-32, Oakland Manor, 5430 Vantage Point Road, Columbia Maryland
- HO-33, Blandair, 6651 Little Patuxent Parkway (MD 175), Columbia
- HO-34, Waveland, Sewells Orchard Drive, Columbia
- HO-35, Christ Church (Queen Caroline Parish Church), 6800 Oakland Mills Road, Columbia
- HO-36, Oak Hall Site, Oak Hall Lane, Columbia
- HO-37, Athol, 6680 Columbia Pike (US 29), Columbia
- HO-38, Montpelier, 10904 Johns Hopkins Road, Laurel
- HO-39, Worthington's Quarters (White Hall, Iris Hall), Weather Worn Way, Columbia
- HO-40, Moundland, Guilford Road, Columbia
- HO-41, Commodore Joshua Barney House (Harry's Lott), 7912 Savage Guilford Road, Jessup
- HO-42, Savage Mill Historic District, Savage
- HO-43, Belmont (Moore's Morning Choice), 6555 Belmont Woods Road, Elkridge
- HO-44, Troy Hill (Troy), Baltimore Washington Boulevard (US 1), Elkridge
- HO-45, Trinity Church, 7474 Baltimore Washington Boulevard (US 1), Elkridge
- HO-46, Spurriers Tavern, site, Waterloo Road (MD 175) & Baltimore Washington Boulebard (US 1), Jessup
- HO-47, Temora, 4252 Columbia Road, Ellicott City
- HO-48, Woodlawn (Le Papillon), 8880 Frederick Road, Ellicott City
- HO-49, Mount Hebron, 2331 Calvin Circle, Ellicott City
- HO-50, First Presbyterian Church (Howard County Historical Society Building), 8328 Court Avenue, Ellicott City

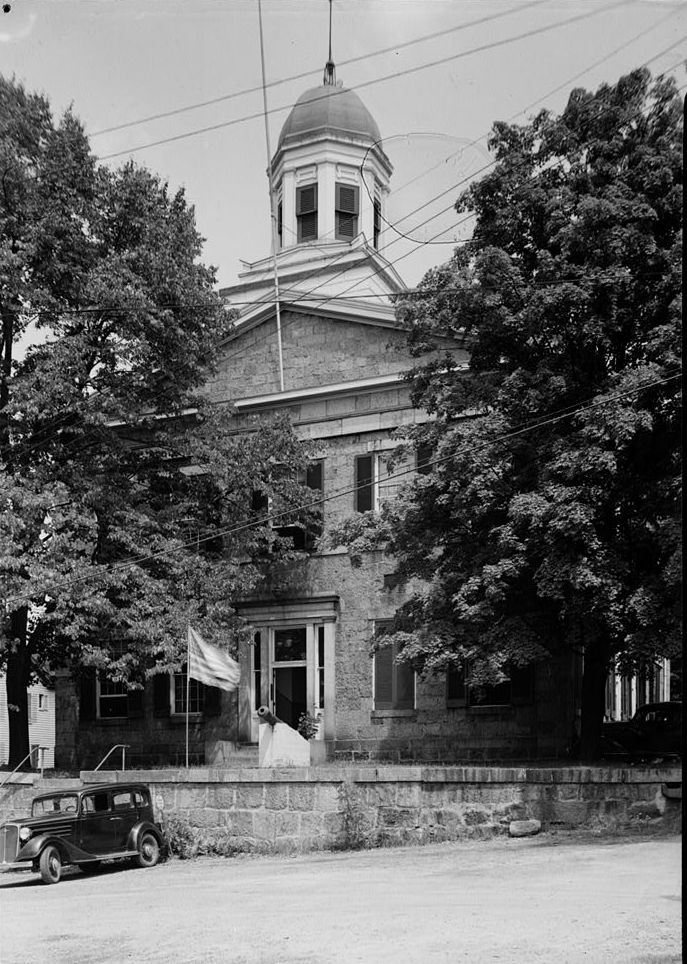
HO-51 Howard County Courthouse

- HO-51, Howard County Courthouse, 8360 Court Avenue, Ellicott City
- HO-52, Patapsco National Bank, 8098 Main Street (MD 144), Ellicott City
- HO-53, Samuel Powell House, 8198 Main Street (MD 144), Ellicott City
- HO-54, Howard County Jail, 3709 Park Avenue (Formerly 1 Emory Street), Ellicott City
- HO-55, Emory Methodist Church, 3799 Church Road, Ellicott City
- HO-56, Jenkins-Powell House (Jonathan Ellicott House, MacGill House), 3791 Church Road, Ellicott City
- HO-57, The Manse, 3788 Church Road, Ellicott City
- HO-58, Angelo Castle (Angelo Cottage, Castle Angelo), 3749 Church Road, Ellicott City
- HO-59, Mount Ida, 3691 Sarah's Lane, Ellicott City
- HO-60, Patapsco Female Institute (Patapsco Heights Hotel), 3655 Church Road, Ellicott City

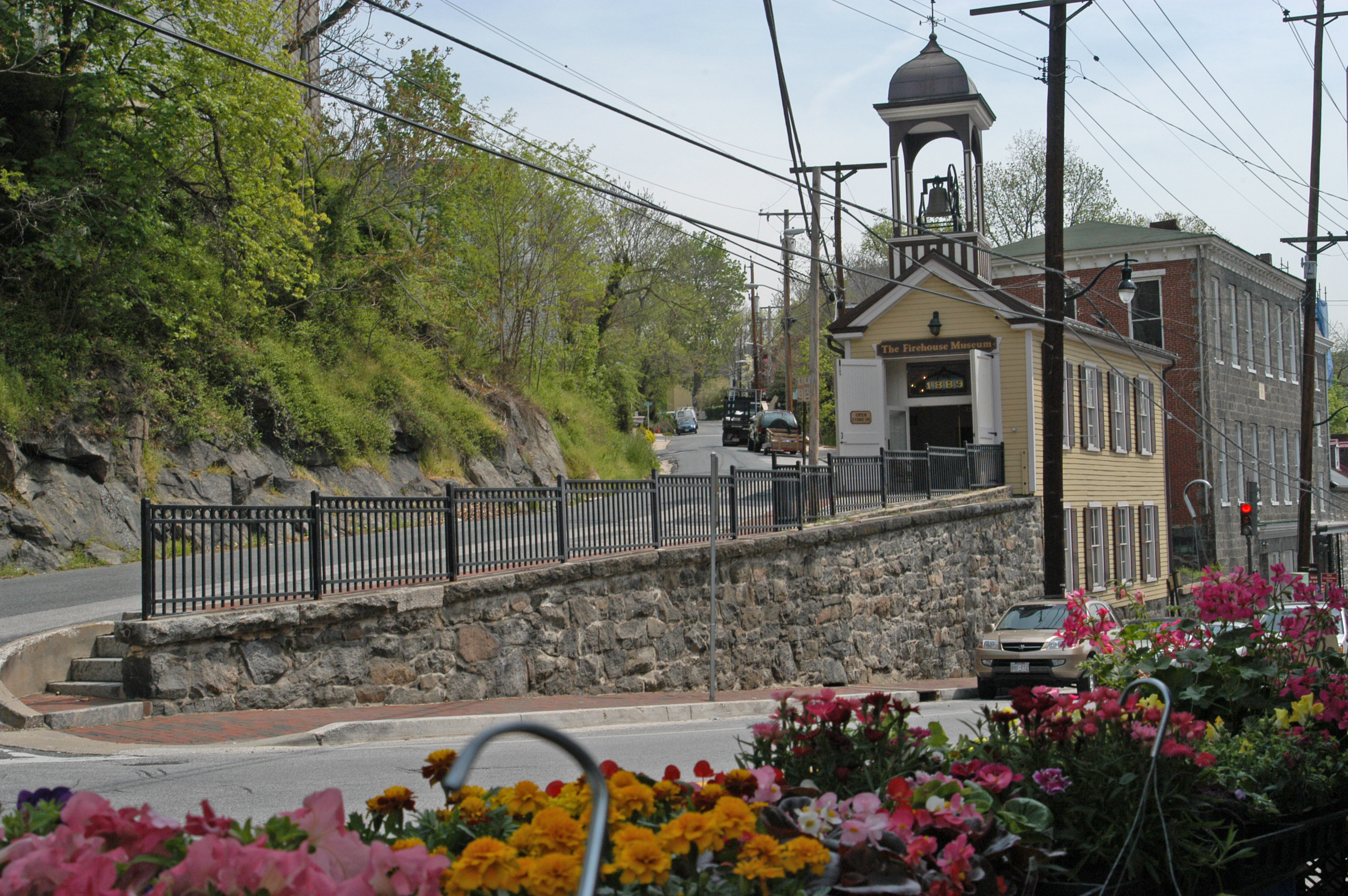
HO-61 Firehouse Museum

- HO-61, The Firehouse Museum (Old Howard Co. Fire Department Building, Old Howard Co. Public Library), 3829 Church Road, Ellicott City
- HO-62, The Town Hall (Opera House, Rhodey's Emporium), 8044-8046 Main Street (MD 144), Ellicott City
- HO-63, Patterson Viaduct, Ilchester Road & River Road, Catonsville
- HO-64, Thomas Isaac's Log Cabin (Stanton's Log Cabin), Main Street (MD 144) & Ellicott Mills Drive, Ellicott City
- HO-65, Ellicott Family Burial Grounds, Old Columbia Pike (MD 987), Ellicott City
- HO-66, Quaker Burial Grounds, Old Columbia Pike (MD 987), Ellicott City
- HO-67, Friends Meeting House (Quaker Meeting House), 3771 Old Columbia Pike (MD 987), Ellicott City
- HO-68, Howard House, 8202 Main Street (MD 144), Ellicott City
- HO-69, Walker-Chandler House (Ellicott Country Store), Mrs. Rowland Bounds' House, 8180 Main Street (MD 144), Ellicott City
- HO-70, Patapsco Hotel (Thomas' Patapsco Hotel, Stewart's Hotel, Wilson Patapsco Hotel, Ellicott City Times), Ellicott City

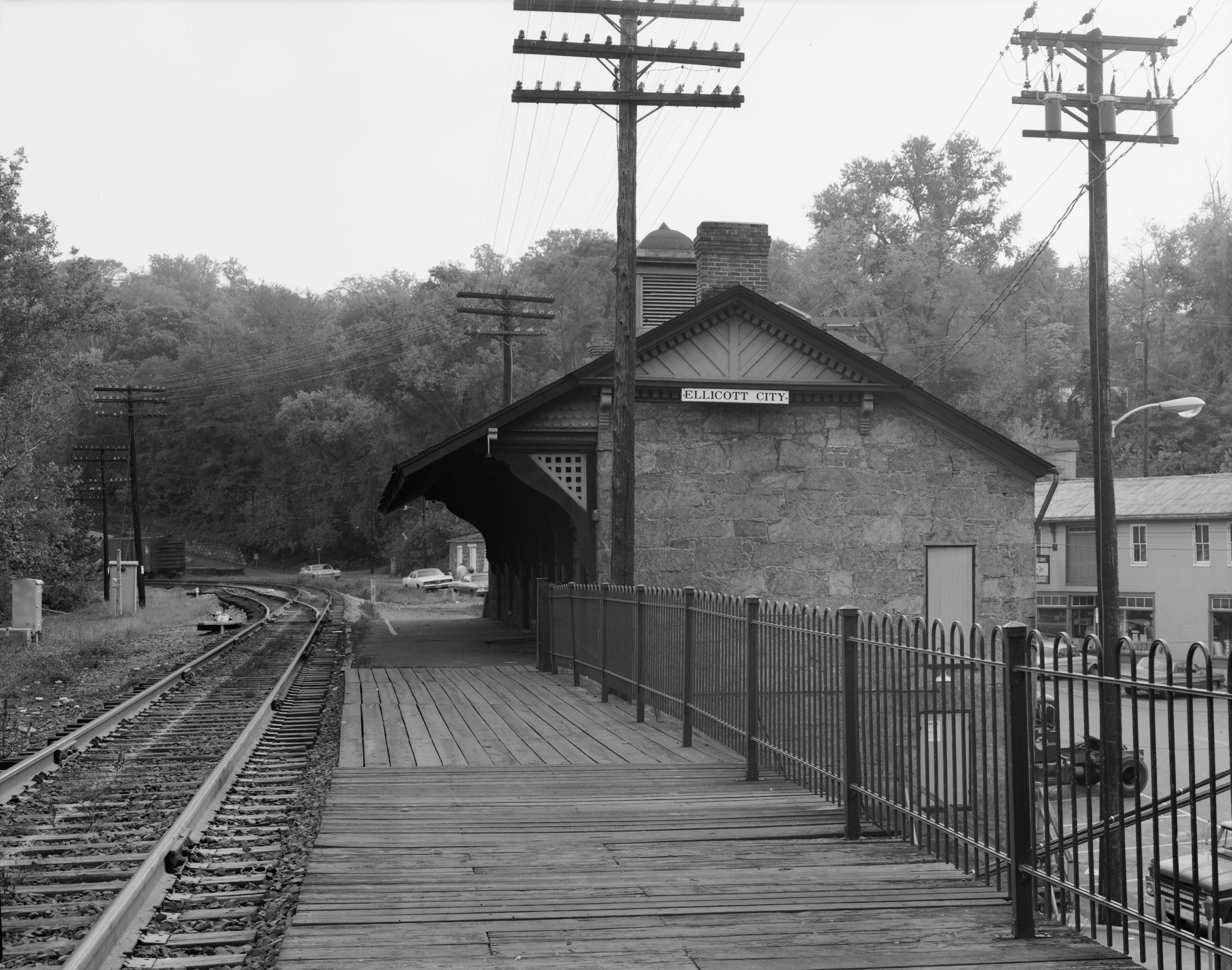
HO-71 Ellicott City Station

- HO-71, Ellicott City B&O Railroad Station, Freight Building, & Turntable, 2711 Maryland Avenue, Ellicott City
- HO-72, Bridge Market (E.T. Clark Property, Radcliffe's Emporium, Louis T. Clark Grocery), 8000 Main Street (MD 144), Ellicott City
- HO-73, Ellicott Mill Original Historic Site, Frederick Road (MD 144), Ellicott City
- HO-74, BLANK
- HO-75, BLANK
- HO-76, St. Paul's Catholic School (Patapsco National Bank), St. Paul Street, Ellicott City
- HO-77, BLANK
- HO-78, Ellicott City Historic District, Ellicott City
- HO-79, I.O.O.F. Lodge Building (Annie's), 8126-8132 Main Street (MD 144), Ellicott City
- HO-80, Thomas Viaduct, Baltimore & Ohio Railway, B&O Railroad over Patapsco River, Halethorpe

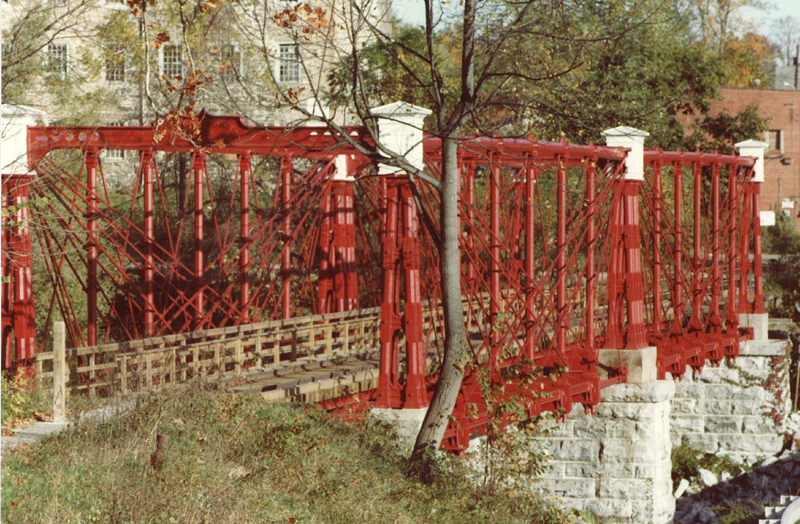
HO-81 Bollman Bridge, Savage

- HO-81, Bollman Suspension Truss Bridge, Savage Road, Savage
- HO-82, Disney's Tavern (Mount Misery, Fabric House, Sprecher House), H.H. Tamburo Shop, 8298-8304 Main Street (MD 144), Ellicott City
- HO-83, Collier's Grist Mill (Bernard Fort CM, Ellicott City Mills, E. C. Electric Light and Power Co.), 8069 Tiber Alley, Ellicott City
- HO-84, Linden Grove (New Year's Gift), 5790 Tamar Drive, Columbia
- HO-85, Montrose Farm, 13370 Brighton Dam Road, Clarksville
- HO-86, Railroad Hotel (TurnOver a NewLeaf, The Meeting House), 8028-8046 Main Street (MD 144), Ellicott City
- HO-87, Bethesda (Dower Cottage, Long Reach), 9140 Sybert Drive, Ellicott City
- HO-88, Cacao Lane Restaurant (Hunt's General Store, Millinery Shop, Edward Alexander House), 8066-8068 Main Street (MD 144), Ellicott City
- HO-89, Bernard Campbell House (Froogle Fashions, Import Specialties), 8074-8082 Main Street (MD 144), Ellicott City
- HO-90, Charlotte Tazewell House (Lena McCauley Brick House), 8192 Main Street (MD 144), Ellicott City

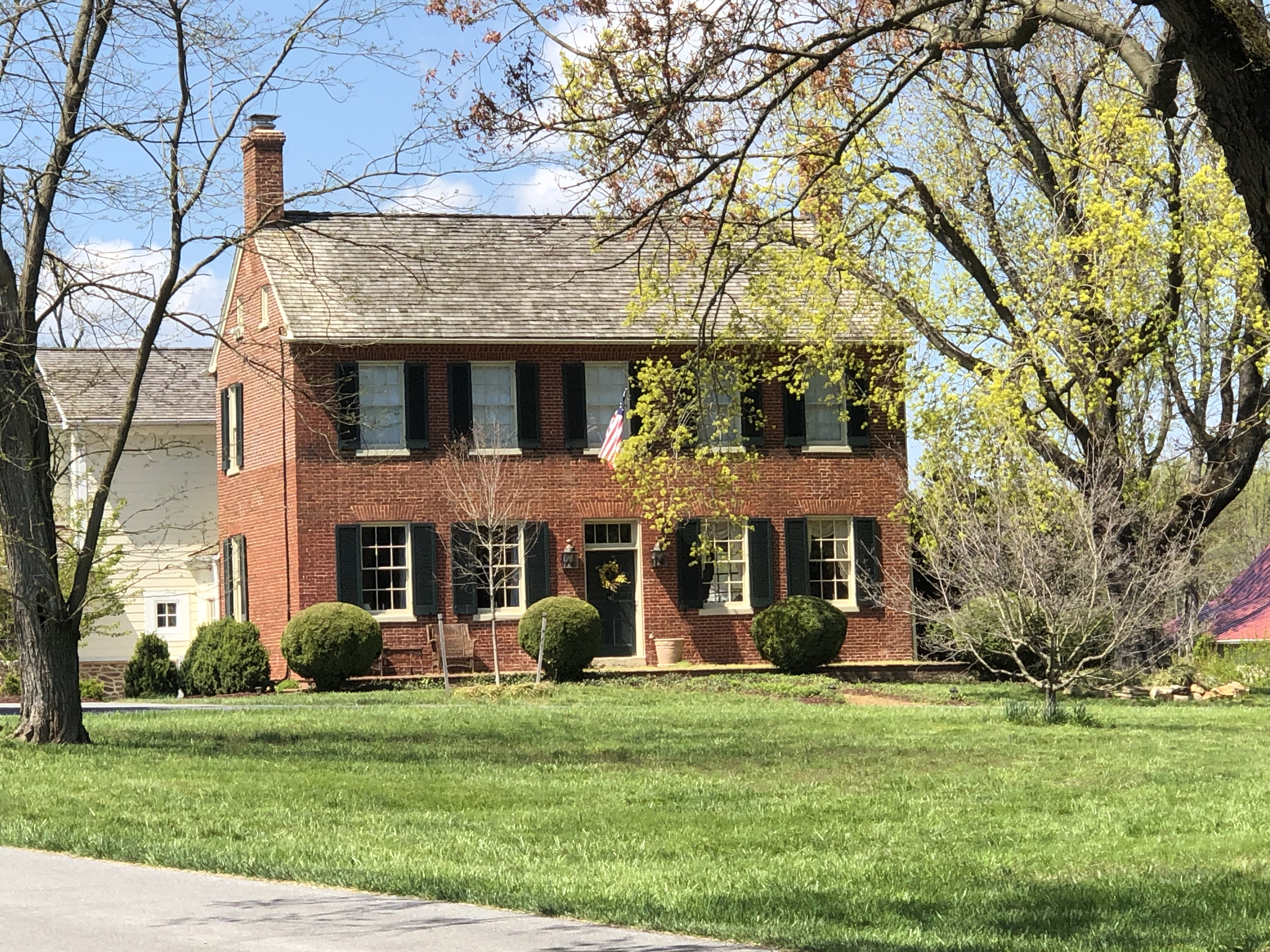
HO-91 Hobson's Choice, Woodbine

- HO-91, Hobson's Choice, 2921 Florence Road, Woodbine
- HO-92, Trusty Friend, Frederick Road (MD 144), Cooksville
- HO-93, BLANK
- HO-94, Samuel Powell House (Chateau Wine Supplies, Rhodey Beer Garden, Navicki's (Votta's) Shoe Repair), 8120 Main Street (MD 144), Ellicott City
- HO-95, Wheatfields (Chews Resolution Manor), 4588 Montgomery Road (MD 103), Ellicott City
- HO-96, Elmonte (Twilford), Furrow Avenue, Ellicott City
- HO-97, John Williams' House (Pairo & Pairo Law Offices), 8086 Main Street (MD 144), Ellicott City
- HO-98, Lauman House (Alda Baptiste, Tongue Row Fabric Boutique), 8060 Main Street (MD 144), Ellicott City
- HO-99, Margaret Smith Gallery (Norton's Drug Store), 8090 Main Street (MD 144), Ellicott City
- HO-100, Bicentennial Headquarters Building, 8355 Court Avenue, Ellicott City
- HO-101, St. Paul's Episcopal Church, Old Frederick Road, Mt. Airy
- HO-102, Sarah Jane Powell Log Cabin (Albert E. France Log Cabin), 2240 Roxbury Mills Road (MD 97), Cooksville
- HO-103, Charles Layton, Jr. Log Building, site, 1221 St. Michaels Road, Woodbine
- HO-104, Thaddeus Crapster's Log House, 3101 Cabin Run, Woodbine
- HO-105, Ellicott House (Rockland Farm), 3500 Woodbine Road (MD 94), Woodbine
- HO-106, Robert Hunter House, Annapolis Rock Road, Woodbine
- HO-107, George G. Willson Log House, site, Annapolis Rock Road, Woodbine
- HO-108, Hipsley's Mill Road Log Ruins, site, Hipsley Mill Road, Woodbine
- HO-109, Ann B. Dunn's Log House, ruin, Daisy Road & Jennings Chapel Road, Woodbine
- HO-110, Dr. John Hood Owings House, site & Jennings Cemetery, Jennings Chapel Road, Brookville
- HO-111, Happy Retreat, 3100 McNeal Road, Woodbine
- HO-112, J.P. Tarenz Log House (Cherry Grove Slave Quarters), 2898 Duvall Road, Woodbine
- HO-113, Bernard Warfield Farm (The Heritage, Bite the Skinner), 16539 A.E. Mullinix Road, Woodbine
- HO-114, The Heritage Log Building, site, A.E. Mullinix Road, Woodbine
- HO-115, Sunnyside (Albert G. Warfield, III House), Woodbine Road (MD 94), Woodbine
- HO-116, Beldon Patrick Farmhouse (Maple Dell Farm), 1960 Daisy Road, Woodbine
- HO-117, Dr. William J. Bryson House (Summer Hill Farm), Frederick Road (MD 144), Cooksville
- HO-118, Albert Schulze Post & Plank Building, site, 1685 St. Michaels Road, Woodbine
- HO-119, Deep Meadow, 3173 Daisy Road, Woodbine
- HO-120, By His Grace, 3710 Roxbury Mills Road (MD97), Glenwood
- HO-121, Nancy Valle's Stone House, 4401 Roxbury Mills Road (MD97), Brookville
- HO-122, Stephen B. Dorsey Farm Tenant House (Russell Maisel's Stone House), 15282 Roxbury Road, Glenelg
- HO-123, Clark Family House (George Chase Brick House), 15081 Roxbury Road, Roxbury Mills
- HO-124, St. Barnabas Episcopal Church, 13135 Forsythe Road, Sykesville
- HO-125, Wavertree, 12961 Triadelphia Road, Ellicott City
- HO-126, Marvin Howard Log Building, Dorsey Mill Road, Glenwood
- HO-127, Linda Byrd Eareckson Stone-Log House, 601 River Road, Sykesville
- HO-128, Judge John L. Clark House (Dr. & Mrs. T.S.Herbert House), Marriotsville Road, Marriotsville
- HO-129, Alexander Hassan Stone Ruins, Old Frederick Road (MD99), Woodstock
- HO-130, Doughoregan Manor Gate House, 3120 Manor Lane, Ellicott City
- HO-131, Enniscorthy (Albert S. Hammond House), 3412 Folly Quarter Road, Ellicott City
- HO-132, Franciscan Friars Novitiate, 12290 Folly Quarter Road, Ellicott City
- HO-133, Doughoregan Manor Stone House, Old Manor Lane, Ellicott City
- HO-134, William Johnson Estate House, 4411 Manor Lane, Ellicott City
- HO-135, Jack Gebhard House (Porter's Tavern), 4955 Manor Lane, Ellicott City
- HO-136, Joel Kline Farm Ruins, Clarksville Pike (MD 108), Ellicott City
- HO-137, Hopkins-Brosenne' Stone House (Pine Orchard Hotel), 10281 Baltimore National Pike (US 40), Ellicott City
- HO-138, Gerwig-Lintner House, site (Lintner Stone House), 10101 Frederick Road (MD 144), Ellicott City
- HO-139, Shirley (Little Brick House Farm, Herman Feaga Brick House), 10212 Little Brick House Court, Ellicott City
- HO-140, Gary Memorial Methodist Church, Daniels Road, Ellicott City

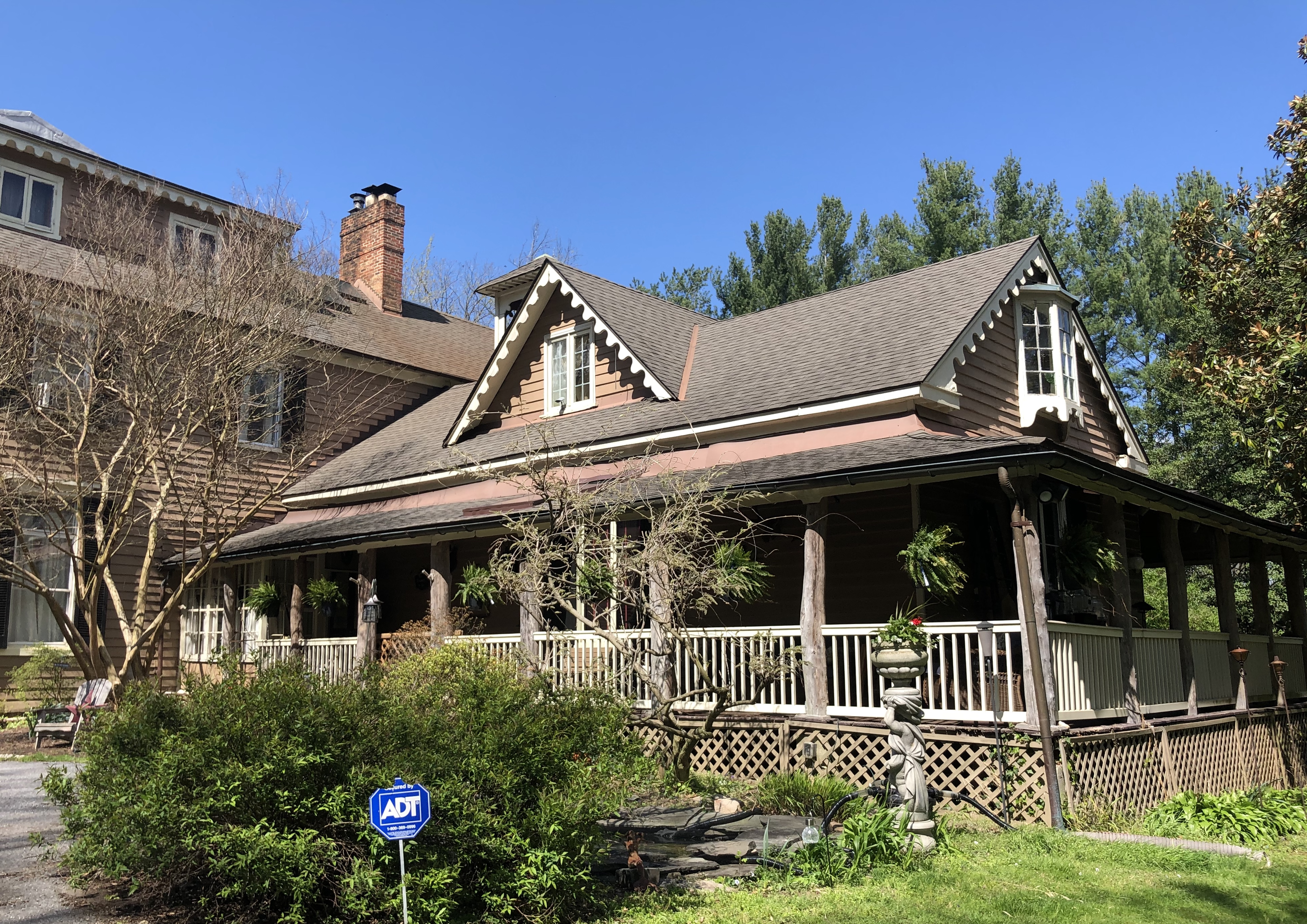
HO-141 The Lawn, Elkridge

- HO-141, The Lawn, 6036 Old Lawyers Hill Road, Elkridge
- HO-142, Old St. Johns Rectory, 3508 W. Gate Drive, Ellicott City
- HO-143, MacAlpine Slave Quarters (Diniz House), 3645 Mac Alpine Road, Ellicott City
- HO-144, Wayside Inn (Search Enlarged, Bethesda), 4344 Columbia Road, Ellicott City
- HO-145, Mt. Joy (Santa Fe), 5000 Executive Park Drive, Ellicott City
- HO-146, Stempner House, 5777 Main Street, Elkridge
- HO-147, Eklof House (Chews Vineyard), 494 New Cut Road, Ellicott City
- HO-148, Frank Boggs House, 5306 Waterloo Road (MD 104), Ellicott City
- HO-149, Clover Hill (John C. Roswell House), 6121 Rockburn Branch Park Road, Elkridge
- HO-150, Alice L. Lorenz House, Elkridge
- HO-151, Rockburn, 6581 Belmont Woods Road, Elkridge
- HO-152, Hockley Grist Mill House (Dorsey Mill), 5481 Levering Avenue, Elkridge
- HO-153, Fairview (Warfield's Range, Gorman House), 10150 Gorman Road, Laurel
- HO-154, Kelly Stone House (Coopers House at Oakland Mill), 5509 Old Columbia Road, Columbia
- HO-155, Gales-Gaither Stone House, 5505 Old Columbia Road, Columbia
- HO-156, Dalton, 9315 Mellenbrook Road, Columbia
- HO-157, Alabama Farm, site, Trotter Road, Columbia
- HO-158, River Hill Farm (Four Brothers Portion, Richard B.Owings House), Guilford Road, Clarksville
- HO-159, Oakland Farms, 14175 Old Frederick Road, Cooksville
- HO-160, Bassler House (HRD), Sunny Spring, Columbia
- HO-161, John L. Due House (Henry Warfield House, Trotter House), 6044 Trotter Road, Clarksville
- HO-162, Sturdevant Building, Clarksville Pike (MD 108), Clarksville
- HO-163, Tierney Gambrel Roof House, site (Howard's Range), Guilford Road & Clarksville Pike (MD 108), Clarksville
- HO-164, Clifton (Wellings Stone House, White Wine and Claret), 6420 Warm Sunshine Path, Clarksville
- HO-165, Owings-Myerly House, site (Vogel House), 7538 Guilford Road (MD 32), Simpsonville
- HO-166, St. Mark's Episcopal Church, 12700 Hall Shop Road, Highland
- HO-167, Locust Grove (David Clarke Farmhouse), 1095 Hood's Mill Road (MD 97), Cooksville
- HO-168, Banks Schoolhouse, 15491 Roxbury Mills Road (MD 97), Glenwood
- HO-169, Roxbury Mill Miller's House, 4102 Roxbury Mill Road, Brookeville
- HO-170, Shipley's Adventure (Dr. Perilla House), 14830 Old Frederick Road, Clarksville
- HO-171, Hedgerow (Left Out, Left Over, 13551 Triadelphia Mill Road, Clarksville
- HO-172, Adams Cottage, 5790 Ten Oaks Road, Clarksville
- HO-173, Hood Family Cemetery (Ridgely Jones Property), Underwood Road, Sykesville
- HO-174, Tubman House (Meadow Ridge Memorial Park House), 7250 Baltimore Washington Boulevard (US 1), Elkridge
- HO-175, Judge William Matthew's House (Kingsdine), 2945 Roxbury Mills Road (MD 97), Glenwood
- HO-176, Glenwood Country Club Building (Hepburn House), 2902 Roxbury Mills Road (MD 97), Glenwood
- HO-177, Holly Rock Farm (J.B. Mathews House, Bloomsburg), 3060 Roxbury Mills Road (MD 97), Glenwood
- HO-178, Schroll House, 8418 A Baltimore Washington Boulevard (US 1), Jessup
- HO-179, Factory House (Percon Inc. Building), site, Old Scaggsville Road, Scaggsville
- HO-180, Hobbs Regulation, 2555 McKendree Road, Glenwood
- HO-181, R. Hook Log House (Hackett Log House), 14465 Frederick Road (MD 144), Cooksville
- HO-182, Mrs. Miller Mills House (Francis Shipley House), 13523 Triadelphia Road, Ellicott City
- HO-183, Day House and Store, 14040 Triadelphia Road, Glenelg
- HO-184, Old Oakland Manor (Ralston House), 10026 Hyla Brook Road, Columbia
- HO-185, Oakland Manor Blacksmith Shop (Ralston Stone Cottage), 10102 Hyla Brook Road, Columbia
- HO-186, Clarkland Farm & Log Smokehouse (Charles R. Pue Farm/Hammond's Inheritance), 10380 Clarksville Pike (MD 108), Ellicott City
- HO-187, Harmony Cemetery, McKendree Road, West Friendship
- HO-188, Granite Park, Murray Hill Drive, Columbia
- HO-189, Humphrey Wolfe Farm (John Beane Farm), 3607 Roxbury Mills Road (MD 97), Glenwood
- HO-190, Good Fellowship, 1795 Woodstock Road (MD 125), Woodstock
- HO-191, Roland Maxwell Farmhouse (Carl R. Myers House), 1805 Marriottsville Road, Marriottsville
- HO-192, Friendship Pines, 13905 Frederick Road (MD 144), Cooksville
- HO-193, Linwood (Linwood Children's Center), 3421 Martha Bush Drive, Ellicott City
- HO-194, Welsh-Webb Farm, site (Trail House, Dale Mouser House, Wagon Trail Farm), 16180 Frederick Road (MD 144), Woodbine
- HO-195, Fowble House, site, Frederick Road (MD 144), Lisbon
- HO-196, Flohr House, site, Frederick Road (MD 144), Lisbon
- HO-197, Cheaks Tavern, site (Stage Coach Inn, Charles Reck Home), Frederick Road (MD 144), Lisbon
- HO-198, Cope-Knox Log House, site (M. E. Parsonage, Albert G. Warfield House), 16041 Frederick Road (MD 144), Lisbon
- HO-199, Methodist Episcopal Parsonage (Flohr-Barnes House), site, 16037 Frederick Road (MD 144), Lisbon
- HO-200, Alvin G. Leamon House (Thacker-Cogswell House), 16032 Frederick Road (MD 144), Lisbon
- HO-201, Mathis House, 16024 Frederick Road (MD 144), Lisbon
- HO-202, Mayne House (Owings Log-Brick House), 16020 Frederick Road (MD 144), Lisbon
- HO-203, Emerson Pickett Log House, site, Frederick Road (MD 144), Lisbon
- HO-204, Lisbon Presbyterian Manse (Lisbon M.P. Parsonage, McIntosh House), 16000 Frederick Road (MD 144), Lisbon
- HO-205, Lee's Market and House, 16005 Frederick Road (MD 144), Lisbon
- HO-206, Lisbon Hotel (Drovers Inn, Poole's Country Store & Post Office, Caleb Pancoast House site), Frederick Road (MD 144) & Madison Street, Lisbon
- HO-207, Westwood M.E. Church, 13554 Triadelphia Road, Ellicott City
- HO-208, Brown Chapel U.M. Church, Howard Road, Dayton
- HO-209, Providence (Methodist) Church (Tatiana), 14290 Triadelphia Road, Glenwood
- HO-210, E. Walter Scott Farmhouse (Quail Hill Antiques), 6791 Guilford Road, Clarksville
- HO-211, Dundee, 3775 Bonny Bridge Place, Ellicott City
- HO-212, Dundee Smokehouse, Bonny Bridge Place, Ellicott City
- HO-213, Savage Mill (Savage Industrial Center), Foundry Street & Washington Street, Savage
- HO-214, Carroll Baldwin Memorial Hall (Savage Community Hall), 9035 Foundry Street, Savage
- HO-215, 19th Century Mill Workers Houses, 9040-9062 Washington Street, Savage
- HO-216, Old Mill Apartment House (Storch Apartment House #1), 9078 Washington Street, Savage
- HO-217, Old Mill Workers Apartment House (Storch Apt. House), 9105-9111 Washington Street, Savage
- HO-218, Savage-Irving House (Mansion House, Baldwin House), 9110 Washington Street, Savage
- HO-219, Masonic Hall (Solomon's Lodge #121 A.F. & A.M.), 2-4 Washington Street, Savage
- HO-220, Holte-Grafton House (Savage Mill Managers House), 8502 Fair Street, Savage
- HO-221, Hutchinson-Hobbs House (Upper Baltimore St. Mill Houses), 9132-9136 Baltimore Street, Savage
- HO-222, Gralton's Apartment House, 9105-9111 Baltimore Street, Savage
- HO-223, Chickering House, 9066 Baltimore Street, Savage
- HO-224, Minnie W. Rooney House, 9056-9058 Baltimore Street, Savage
- HO-225, Mill Workers Houses (Storch Realty Duplexes), Savage
- HO-226, Victor Myers Farmhouse, 9915 Gorman Road, Laurel
- HO-227, Lewis Warfield House, 15948 Frederick Road (MD 144), Lisbon
- HO-228, Dorsey-Hall House, site (Bidinger House), Frederick Road (MD 144), Lisbon
- HO-229, Roy Martin House, site, Frederick Road (MD 144), Lisbon
- HO-230, Lisbon Female School (Clark-Coursey House), 15928 Frederick Road (MD 144), Lisbon
- HO-231, Paul Joggereit House, 15927 Frederick Road (MD 144), Lisbon
- HO-232, Esworthy House, 15935 Frederick Road (MD 144), Lisbon
- HO-233, The Misses Warfield House (Snyder's Piano & Organ, Inc.), 15947 Frederick Road (MD 144), Lisbon
- HO-234, Zubovic Farmhouse, 1259 Ridge Road (MD 27), Mt. Airy
- HO-235, St. Stephens A.M.E. Church, 7741 Mayfield Avenue, Elkridge
- HO-236, Overlook Farms (The Gould House), Murray Hill Road, Laurel
- HO-237, Stansfield House, Gorman Road, Laurel
- HO-238, Glenelg Gardeners Cottage, 12789 Folly Quarter Road, Glenelg
- HO-239, The Herbiary (Rhinelander House), 12549 Folly Quarter Road, Ellicott City
- HO-240, McKendree Methodist Church (Sharon Mission Baptist Church), McKendree Road, West Friendship
- HO-241, Ellicott Family Burial Grounds, Old Frederick Road, Ellicott City
- HO-242, Joseph Ellicott House (Hollifield House, c. 1845), 8262 Old Frederick Road, Ellicott City
- HO-243, The Oaks, 3251 Oaks Road, Ellicott City
- HO-244, Lisbon Methodist Church, site, Frederick Road (MD 144) & Hopkins Alley, Lisbon
- HO-245, Warner-Hawks House (Warner House), site, 16033 Frederick Road (MD 144), Lisbon
- HO-246, Powers House, 16025 Frederick Road (MD 144), Lisbon
- HO-247, Buckingham House (Edgar Smith Log & Frame House), 16021 Frederick Road (MD 144), Lisbon
- HO-248, Harmony Church, 15996 North Avenue, Lisbon
- HO-249, Ridgely-Mercier House (R.A. Poole House), 15921 Frederick Road (MD 144), Lisbon
- HO-250, Howard Chapel U.M. Church (Howard Chapel M.E. Church), 1970 Long Corner Road, My. Airy
- HO-251, Klein-Flynn House, 1614 Long Corner Road, Mt. Airy
- HO-252, Warfield-Dougherty Store (Old Florence Store), 2600 Woodbine Road, Woodbine
- HO-253, Old Florence School, 3055 Florence Road, Woodbine
- HO-254, Jennings Chapel U.M. Church, 2601 Jennings Chapel Road, Woodbine
- HO-255, Warfield Family Cemetery, Jennings Chapel Road, Woodbine
- HO-256, Albert Warfield Victorian House, 3300 Florence Road, Woodbine
- HO-257, Albert Warfield Tenant House, 3370 Florence Road, Woodbine
- HO-258, Daisy Trading Post and House, 15948 Union Chapel Road, Woodbine
- HO-259, Daisy I.O.O.F. Building, site, 15949 Union Chapel Road, Woodbine
- HO-260, Kimble's Cottage, 15698 Union Chapel Road, Woodbine
- HO-261, Fulfillment (Milly's Delight), Union Chapel Road, Woodbine
- HO-262, Myers Apartment Building, site (Inwood P.O. & General Store), Roxbury Mills Road (MD 97) & McKendree Road, Glenwood
- HO-263, House of Silence (Ridgely's Reserve, Hakes Log House), 15780 Union Chapel Road, Woodbine
- HO-264, Chippendale Farm (Justifiable), 14751 Addison Way, Woodbine
- HO-265, Warfield's Range Log Cabin, site (Phelps Log Cabin), 10504 Patuxent Ridge Way, Laurel
- HO-266, Warfield's Range (Phelphs Residence, Twin Cedars), 10504 Patuxent Ridge Way, Laurel
- HO-267, Wildwood, Guilford Road, Columbia
- HO-268, Hatfield Residence (Millers House), 6691 Cedar Lane, Columbia
- HO-269, Charles Scaggs House, 10909 Johns Hopkins Road, Laurel
- HO-270, Oak Grove Cemetery, Roxbury Mills Road (MD 97) & Union Chapel Road, Glenwood
- HO-271, Oakhurst (Lardy House), 2460 McKendree Road, West Friendship
- HO-272, Warfield Cemetery, 14675 Carrs Mill Road, Glenwood
- HO-273, Toomey House (Elkridge Furnace Tenant House), 5730 Furnace Road, Elkridge
- HO-274, Hubert Black House (Larriland Farm), 2416 Woodbine Road (MD 94), Woodbine
- HO-275, Daisy United Methodist Church, 2685 Daisy Road, Woodbine
- HO-276, Mt. Gregory United Methodist Church, 2325 Roxbury Mills Road (MD 97), Cooksville
- HO-277, St. Louis King Roman Catholic Church and Cemetery, 12500 Clarksville Pike (MD 108), Clarksville
- HO-278, Tranquility (Peterson House), 4054 Jennings Chapel Road, Brookeville
- HO-279, Harwood (Harlow House, Point Lookout Farm), 3676 Jennings Chapel Road, Woodbine
- HO-280, Arthur Forsyth House (McCracken House), 14396 Old Frederick Road, Cooksville
- HO-281, Wilderness Farm (Old Joshua Warfield Home), 3366 Jennings Chapel Road, Woodbine
- HO-282, Limestone Valley Farm Stone Tenant House (Hayland Farm), Sheppard Lane, Clarksville
- HO-283, Kefauver Boarding House, 8507 Old Frederick Road, Ellicott City
- HO-284, Oak Lawn (Hayden House, former Board of Ed. Building), 8360 Court Place, Ellicott City
- HO-285, Weir House (Second School Building, Planning Office), 8324 Court Avenue, Ellicott City
- HO-286, Trollinger Cabin (No Documentation on File), Main Street, Ellicott City
- HO-287, Cattail Farm (Reilly Farm), 4078 Roxbury Mills Road (MD 97), Glenwood
- HO-288, Ruth Daggett House, 1276 Hoods Mill Road (MD 97), Cooksville
- HO-289, Meriweather (Butler House), 14944 Roxbury Road, Glenelg
- HO-290, St. Michaels Roman Catholic Church, St. Michael Road & Hardy Road, Mt Airy
- HO-291, Oakley Farm (Celia Holland Home), 15802 Frederick Road (MD 144), Woodbine
- HO-292, Joshua Disney Wheelwright Shop (Butterfield's), Clarksville Pike (MD 108), Highland
- HO-293, King's Contrivance (Howard Research&DevelopmentCorp.), Shaker Drive, Columbia
- HO-294, Wilson House at Roxbury Mill (Hilltop), 4152 Roxbury Mill Road, Brookeville
- HO-295, Woodcamp Farm (Hough House), 17403 Hardy Road, Mt. Airy
- HO-296, Earl Hough Farmhouse, 17520 Hardy Road, Mt. Airy
- HO-297, Rose Hill (Alva Collins House), 979 Hood's Mill Road (MD 97), Cooksville
- HO-298, St. Peter's Rectory & Parish House, 8205 St. Paul Place, Ellicott City
- HO-299, St. Peter's Episcopal Church, site, St. Paul Place, Ellicott City
- HO-300, Broxton, 3829 Old Columbia Pike (MD 987), Ellicott City
- HO-301, Tuten's Cottage, site, 3825 Old Columbia Pike (MD 987), Ellicott City
- HO-302, Charles Ringley's House, 3820 Old Columbia Pike (MD 987), Ellicott City
- HO-303, Bruce Smyser's Double House, 3815 Old Columbia Pike (MD 987), Ellicott City
- HO-304, Paul Perkins House, 3821 Old Columbia Pike (MD 987), Ellicott City
- HO-305, Esther Rettger's Two-Part House, 3801-3803 Old Columbia Pike (MD 987), Ellicott City
- HO-306, Friends Meeting House Historic Marker, Old Columbia Pike (MD 987), Ellicott City
- HO-307, David Myer's House, 3786-3790 Old Columbia Pike (MD 987), Ellicott City
- HO-308, Manelli Cottage, 3774 Old Columbia Pike (MD 987), Ellicott City
- HO-309, Esther Rettger's Shop (Pieter Meerschaert's Shop), 3752-3754 Tongue Row, Ellicott City
- HO-310, Rebel Trading Post & The Arms Room (Ijams Shop), 3744-3748 Tongue Row, Ellicott City
- HO-311, R&R Unlimited Antiques, 3736-3742 Tongue Row, Elliott City
- HO-312, Hi Ho Silver (Wexford House Shop), 3732 Tongue Row, Ellicott City
- HO-313, George Anderson Shop, 3723 Tongue Row, Ellicott City
- HO-314, Clarkland Farm Stone Tenant House, 10570 Clarksville Pike (MD 108), Columbia
- HO-315, George Burgess House, 8448 Main Street, Ellicott City.
- HO-316, Search Enclosed (The Chambers House), 4119 Old Columbia Pike (MD 987), Ellicott City
- HO-317, Tilghman Grocery Store & House (Gloth Apartment House), 5733-5739 Main Street, Elkridge
- HO-318, Empty
- HO-319, The Tilghman-Ferraro House, 5741-5745 Main Street, Elkridge
- HO-320, Pocock-Rodgers House, 5749-5753 Main Street, Elkridge
- HO-321, Gonzales House, 5761 Main Street, Elkridge
- HO-322, Pfeiffer's Corner Blacksmith Shop House, 5961 Waterloo Road (MD 108), Ellicott City
- HO-323, No Name, 8080 Main Street (MD 144), Ellicott City
- HO-324, Mathews-E.T. Clark House, 8765 Ruppert Court, Ellicott City
- HO-325, Caleb Merryman's Two Frame Buildings (Abend House, Kirkwood's Double House), 8329-8333 Main Street (MD 144), Ellicott City
- HO-326, Bill Robbins & Carter Building, Ellicott City
- HO-327, Kloman Building (James Earp Residence & Store), 5765 Main Street, Elkridge
- HO-328, Kraft Cottage (Thompson House), 3896 Old Columbia Pike (MD 987), Ellicott City
- HO-329, Howard Lodge #101 Masonic Building, 5814 Main Street, Elkridge
- HO-330, Phoenix Emporium (George Goeller Building, P. Valmas Building), 8053 Main Street (MD 144), Ellicott City
- HO-331, Oakland Manor Slave Quarters, 10102 Hyla Brook Road, Columbia
- HO-332, Oliver Viaduct, Main Street (MD 144), Ellicott City
- HO-333, Ellicott Cottage Lots 3 & 4 (Dennis Mulligan's Two Brick Houses), 3793 Mulligan Hill Lane, Ellicott City
- HO-334, George White Shop, 8624 Main Street, Ellicott City
- HO-335, Rorabaugh House, 10750 Guilford Road (MD 732), Annapolis Junction
- HO-336, William Moore House, 8532-8534 Main Street, Ellicott City
- HO-337, Asbury M. E. Church, Guilford Road (MD 732), Annapolis Junction
- HO-338, Sam Caplan House (Burgess Tenant House, Miller's House), 8454 Main Street, Ellicott City
- HO-339, Sam Caplan's Cottage, site, 8454 Main Street, Ellicott City
- HO-340, Old Howard County Courthouse, 8398 Main Street, Ellicott City
- HO-341, Talbott Lumber Company (Ellicott Mills Brewing Company), 8308 Main Street (MD144), Ellicott City
- HO-342, William R. & Rebecca D. Dorsey House (Rock Hill), 3920 College Avenue, Ellicott City
- HO-343, Curran-Bierly House (The History Shoppe), 8340 Main Street (MD144) (formerly 8398 Court Avenue), Ellicott City
- HO-344, Conley House (Handwerk House, Eckert House, Sulivan House), 4919 Montgomery Road (MD103), Ellicott City
- HO-345, The Vineyard (Devine House), 3611 Church Road, Ellicott City
- HO-346, John Baker Five Houses, 3768-3776 St. Paul Street, Ellicott City
- HO-347, St. Paul's Church Rectory, 3755 St. Paul Street, Ellicott City
- HO-348, St. Paul's Roman Catholic Church, 3749 St. Paul Street, Ellicott City
- HO-349, Guilford Quarry Pratt Through Truss Bridge & Ruins, B&O Railroad Spur over Little Patuxent River, Columbia
- HO-350, Sam Caplan Double Houses, 3760-3766 St. Paul Street, Ellicott City
- HO-351, Old St. Peter's Church Rectory, site, St. Paul Place, Ellicott City
- HO-352, Butke's Log House, site, 3816 New Cut Road, Ellicott City
- HO-353, Lilburn Mansion (Balderstone's Mansion, Hazeldene), 3899 College Avenue, Ellicott City
- HO-354, Lilburn Smokehouse, 3899 College Avenue, Ellicott City
- HO-355, Lilburn Cottage, 3879 College Avenue, Ellicott City
- HO-356, Simpson's Victorian Cottage, site (Porcher Cottage), 4080 College Avenue, Ellicott City
- HO-357, Stillridge Herb Shop (Caplan's Stone Shop), 8129 Main Street (MD 144), Ellicott City
- HO-358, Mumbles and Squeaks (Fissel's Stone Shop), 8133 Main Street (MD 144), Ellicott City
- HO-359, Crosscurrents (Caplan's Frame Shop), 8113 Main Street (MD 144), Ellicott City
- HO-360, Boone House (Stone Shop), 8081 Main Street (MD 144), Ellicott City
- HO-361, Ida Holzweig's Double Stone House #1 (Brown Law Office), 8357 Main Street (MD 144), Ellicott City
- HO-362, Ida Holzweig's Double Stone House #2 (State Farm & Antiques Etc.), 8345 Main Street (MD 144), Ellicott City
- HO-363, Charles Ringly House #2, 3817 Old Columbia Pike, Ellicott City
- HO-364, Earlougher's Tavern (Essie Hammond House, Joseph & Ave Young House), 8777 Frederick Road (formerly 8777 Main Street), Ellicott City
- HO-365, Old National Pike Milestones, Ellicott City
- HO-366, Marshallee & Tenant House (Lyndwood, Markham), Marshalee Lane, Elkridge
- HO-367, Elkridge Furnace Store House (Walker's Inheritance), Furnace Avenue & Race Road, Elkridge
- HO-368, Boyle's Tavern (O'Malley Home), 5760 Main Street, Elkridge
- HO-369, Pococks Store #1, 5721 Main Street, Elkridge
- HO-370, Pococks Store #2, 5725 Main Street, Elkridge
- HO-371, Kynes Store, 5762 Main Street, Elkridge
- HO-372, Thomas Welling House, Old Frederick Road, Sykesville
- HO-373, Fred Pipes House, Old Frederick Road, Sykesville
- HO-374, Blaisdell House, Old Frederick Road, Sykesville
- HO-375, Peddicord House (William Streaker House), 13370 Frederick Road (MD 144), Woodbine
- HO-376, Star House on Turf Valley County Club, Turf Valley Road, Ellicott City
- HO-377, Main Street, Elkridge, Main Street, Elkridge
- HO-378, Armagh (George Dobbin House, Libertini House), 6204 Lawyers Hill Road, Elkridge
- HO-379, Badart Gardens & Barn (Latrobe Estate), 5519 Lawyers Hill Road, Elkridge
- HO-380, Dougherty House (Misses Dobbins House, Thomas Dobbins House)
- HO-381, Elk Ridge Assembly Rooms, 6090 Lawyers Hill Road, Elkridge
- HO-382, Grace Episcopal Church, 5805 Main Street, Elkridge
- HO-383, Melville M. E. Church (Melville Chapel), Furnace Avenue, Elkridge
- HO-384, Gaines A.M.E. Church, Montgomery Road (MD 103), Elkridge
- HO-385, Boyle House, 5695 Main Street, Elkridge
- HO-386, Rokeby (Morris House), 6393 Crossview Road, Elkridge
- HO-387, Hockley (Chittick House, Fosters Fancy), 5925 River Road, Elkridge
- HO-388, Cross Winds, 7255 Montgomery Road (MD 103), Elkridge
- HO-389, Edward Stead House (The Gables, West View), 6235 Lawyers Hill Road, Elkridge
- HO-390, Talbott's Last Shift (Roy Emory House), 5231 Talbots Landing Road, Ellicott City
- HO-391, Olney, 6781-6810 Norris Lane, Elkridge
- HO-392, St. Mary's College & Chapel, site (Mount Clement, St. Clement's College), 4446 Bonnie Branch Road, Ellicott City
- HO-393, Morning Choice (John Malkmus House), 6560 Belmont Woods Road, Elkridge
- HO-394, White Hall 4130 Chatham Road, Ellicott City
- HO-395, St. Clement's Episcopal Boys' School (Dr.Taylor House), 3876 Old Columbia Pike (MD 987), Ellicott City
- HO-396, Woodley (Stephan House), 3925 St. John's Lane, Ellicott City
- HO-397, St. John's Cemetery Lodge, St. John's Lane, Ellicott City
- HO-398, Bon Air Manor (Benson's Park), 4445 Stone Crest Drive, Ellicott City
- HO-399, Bon Air Manor Gate House, 4336 New Cut Road, Ellicott City
- HO-400, MacAlpine, 3621 MacAlpine Road, Ellicott City
- HO-401, Squirrel Hill Farm (Mary & Stevenson White Farm, Mason House), 9725 Old Annapolis Road, Ellicott City
- HO-402, McKenzie's Discovery (Hannon House, No Less), 2416 McKenzie Road, Ellicott City
- HO-403, Meyer-Manner Log House (The Manner House), 10097 Century Drive, Ellicott City
- HO-404, Hagen House (Omar Jones House), 4075 Old Columbia Pike (MD 987), Ellicott City
- HO-405, Pleasant Fields (Talbott's Last Shift, Cook Residence), 4007 Old Columbia Pike (MD 987), Ellicott City
- HO-406, Mt. Pleasant, 10520 Old Frederick Road (MD 99), Woodstock
- HO-407, Invasion- (Dawn Acres), 13155 Frederick Road (MD 144), West Friendship
- HO-408, Sapling Range (McFann House), 14831 Triadelphia Road, Glenelg
- HO-409, Indian Caves (Shipley's Search), 1465 Underwood Road, Sykesville
- HO-410, Ivy Hill, 1201 Driver Road, Marriottsville
- HO-411, Woodlawn Slave Quarters Complex, Bendix Road, Columbia
- HO-412, Gray Rock (Grey Rock), 3518 Angus Valley Trail, Ellicott City
- HO-413, Hickory, Florence Road, Woodbine
- HO-414, Pindell Store & House (Mathews-Pindell House),2960 Roxbury Mills Road (MD 97), Glenwood
- HO-415, The Lindens (Martielli House), 8514 Chapel View Road, Ellicott City
- HO-416, Quarry on the Cattail (Robert Warfield House), Daisy Road, Woodbine
- HO-417, Frog Range, 15408 Frederick Road (MD 144), Woodbine
- HO-418, Annandale, 3274 Jones Road, Woodbine
- HO-419, Holly House Farm, 8105 Holly Manor Way, Fulton
- HO-420, Landing Road Cider Mill Works, site, 5012 Landing Road, Elkridge
- HO-421, Gray House, Klein-Linn house, 4754 Manor Lane, Columbia
- HO-422, Avoca, 4824 Montgomery Road (MD 103), Ellicott City
- HO-423, Dietrick Brick House Farm, 4649 Sheppard Lane, Ellicott City
- HO-424, Grimmet's Chance, 7010 Sanner Road, Clarksville
- HO-425, Windy Acres, 7389 Pindell School Road, Fulton
- HO-426, Springdale Farm, site (T. Guy Nichols Estate), Brighton Dam Road, Highland
- HO-427, Worthington-Carr House, site, Kenton Court, Columbia
- HO-428, Trinity Chapel Sunday School Building, Old Montgomery Road, Oakland Mills
- HO-429, Trinity Church Rectory, 7474 Baltimore Washington Boulevard (US 1), Elkridge
- HO-430, Felicity II (Oakland Mills Blacksmith House and Shop), 5471 Old Columbia Road, Oakland Mills
- HO-431, Mt. Calvary Church (Glenwood Missionary Baptist Church), 3875 Roxbury Mills Road (MD 97), Roxbury
- HO-432, Guilford Methodist Church (Alberta G. Gary Memorial M.E. Church), Guilford Road (MD 32), Columbia
- HO-433, Hazelhurst, Timberland Circle, Ellicott City
- HO-434, Sandstone Farm (The Cissel House, Hammond and Gist), 6927 Mink Hollow Road, Highland
- HO-435, Gerald Hopkins House (M. Burke Sullivan House, Hickory Ridge), 13183 Highland Road, Highland
- HO-436, Dr. Isaac J. Martin House (Kroh House), 3802 Church Road, Ellicott City
- HO-437, Bright House, Lawyer's Row (Reuben Johnson House), 8343 Court Avenue, Ellicott City
- HO-438, Brother's Partnership (Peter Harmon House), 5740 Waterloo Road (MD 108), Columbia
- HO-439, Curtis-Shipley House, 5771 Waterloo Road (MD 108), Ellicott City
- HO-440, Bellow's Spring Meth.Church (Mt. Pisgah A.M.E. Church), 8651 Old Annapolis Road (MD 108), Columbia
- HO-441, Pfeiffers Corner Schoolhouse, 6109 Rockburn Branch Park Road Rockburn Branch Regional Park, Elkridge
- HO-442, Old Guilford School Building, 6899 Oakland Mills Road, Columbia
- HO-443, Roheleder House, site (Mac Sherry Place), 6219 Lawyers Hill Road, Elkridge
- HO-444, Lift-the-Latch, 6176 Lawyers Hill Road, Elkridge
- HO-445, Murray-Miller House (Bonnie Wood), 6117 Lawyers Hill Road, Elkridge
- HO-446, Dobbin-Warner House & Gate House, 6162 Lawyers Hill Road, Elkridge
- HO-447, Maycroft (Atwell House), 6060 Old Lawyers Hill Road, Elkridge
- HO-448, Red Hill House (Hemphill House), 6053 Old Lawyers Hill Road, Elkridge
- HO-449, Old Grace Church Rectory, site, 5970 Baltimore Washington Boulevard (US 1), Elkridge
- HO-450, The Goldbeater's Cottage (Guercio House), 6159 Rockburn Hill Road, Elkridge
- HO-451, Hoogewerff-Donaldson Cottage (Elibank, Worthington House), 6460 Elibank Drive, Elkridge
- HO-452, Tutbury (Forbes House), 6440 Elibank Drive, Elkridge
- HO-453, Trinity School (Donaldson School), Ilchester Road, Elkridge
- HO-454, The Knoll (Richard Olney Norris Tenant House), 6802 Norris Lane, Elkridge
- HO-455, Idle-A-While (Judge Stewart's House), 4688 Beechwood Road, Ellicott City
- HO-456, Fislage-Cavey House (Z.I. Dyke House), 4472 Ilchester Road, Ellicott City
- HO-457, Elkridge Hunt Club, 6101 Hunt Club Road, Elkridge
- HO-458, Ilchester Post Office (Schaad House), 4607 Bonnie Branch Road, Elkridge
- HO-459, Patapsco State Park Ranger's Quarters (Brown House), River Road, Elkridge
- HO-460, Linthicum House, site, Jennings Chapel Road, Glenwood
- HO-461, Hobbs Residence, 5773 Main Street, Elkridge
- HO-462, James Rettger House, 6520 Burgundy Lane, Clarksville
- HO-463, Ellicott City-Montgomery Co.Courthouse Road Milestones 4 & 5, Clarksville Pike (MD 108), Ellicott City
- HO-464, Linthicum House (Anderson House), 10690 Clarksville Pike (MD 108), Ellicott City
- HO-465, John T. Swann House (Watkins House), 13015 Clarksville Pike (MD 108), Columbia
- HO-466, Johnson Shingled House and Outbuildings, 12810 Clarksville Pike (MD 108), Clarksville
- HO-467, Cooney-Smith Farm site (George Richardson Farmhouse, MacBeth Farm), 12799 Clarksville Pike (MD 108), Clarksville
- HO-468, Lambing Meadow Bank Barn & Farm (Sarah Richardson Farm), 12702 Clarksville Pike (MD 108), Clarksville
- HO-469, Keilholtz House, 12670 Clarksville Pike (MD 108), Clarksville
- HO-470, Zepp-Johnston Farm and Outbuildings, site, Clarksville Pike (MD 108), Clarksville
- HO-471, White Oak Farm, 12180 Clarksville Pike (MD 108), Clarksville
- HO-472, Langenfelder Farm and Outbuildings, site, Meadow Vista Way, Clarksville
- HO-473, Manakee Farm Tenant House, Clarksville Pike (MD 108) & Trotter Road, Clarksville
- HO-474, Hobbs Farm, 12058 Clarksville Pike (MD 108), Clarksville
- HO-475, Jericho Farm, site, 11349 Clarksville Pike (MD 108), Columbia
- HO-476, Edgewood Farm, site, Gaither Farm Road, Columbia
- HO-477, Thompson Farm Outbuildings, 10820 Clarksville Pike (MD 108), Columbia
- HO-478, Arthur Pickett House, site, Clarksville Pike (MD 108), Clarksville
- HO-479, Persimmon Bottom Farm, 6010 Ten Oaks Road, Clarksville
- HO-480, Cricket Creek Farm (Stonebrook Farm), 6300 Guilford Road, Clarksville
- HO-481, The Bayard Easter House, site, Clarksville Pike (MD 108), Clarksville
- HO-482, Catherine Kuhn House, 8572 Main Street (MD 144), Ellicott City
- HO-483, S.E. Yates House, 8516 Main Street (MD 144), Ellicott City
- HO-484, Lisbon Fire House Building, 16009 Frederick Road (MD 144), Lisbon
- HO-485, The Martin Slagle House, 15920 Frederick Road (MD 144), Lisbon
- HO-486, The I.O.O.F. Building (Odd Fellows' Hall, Rainbow Lodge No. 76, Church of the Open Bible, store), 16012 Frederick Road (MD 144), Lisbon
- HO-487, Manning Frame House, 16016 Frederick Road (MD 144), Lisbon
- HO-488, Engle House (Compton House), 16015 Frederick Road (MD 144), Lisbon
- HO-489, Owings House (Frey House), 15949 Frederick Road (MD 144), Lisbon
- HO-490, Lisbon Post Office, 15936 Frederick Road (MD 144), Lisbon
- HO-491, Whittington House, 15912 Frederick Road (MD 144), Lisbon
- HO-492, Harris House, 15904 Frederick Road (MD 144), Lisbon
- HO-493, Sydney C. Robertson House, 3744 St. Paul Street, Ellicott City
- HO-494, Waterford Farms, 4005 Jennings Chapel Road, Woodbine
- HO-495, Lisbon Historic District, Lisbon
- HO-496, Lineberg House, 5757 Main Street, Elkridge
- HO-497, Railroad Building, 5600 Main Street, Elkridge
- HO-498, Rowles-McCauley-Petrlik House and Store (McCauley House), 5782 Main Street, Elkridge
- HO-499, Elkridge Pharmacy, Inc., 5806 Main Street, Elkridge
- HO-500, Williams House (Daniels' House), 5828 Main Street, Elkridge
- HO-501, Elkridge Springs, 5834 Main Street, Elkridge
- HO-502, Rowles-Earp-Hand House, site (J.B. Kilby House), 5842 Main Street, Elkridge
- HO-503, Dixon Brick House, 5735 Race Road, Elkridge
- HO-504, Mewshaw House, 5846 Main Street, Elkridge
- HO-505, Dr. Hopkins House, 5858 Main Street, Elkridge
- HO-506, Haker House, site, Brightwood Court, Ellicott City
- HO-507, Collins-Earp House (FCC Monitoring Station), 9200 Farmhouse Road, Columbia
- HO-508, Elkridge Country Club Building, 5746 Main Street, Elkridge
- HO-509, Mrs. Mills Double House, Railroad Avenue, Elkridge
- HO-510, B&O Railroad Company House, Railroad Avenue, Elkridge
- HO-511, William Bian's Two Frame Houses (Gray House & Lineberger House),5683 & 5691 Railroad Avenue, Elkridge
- HO-512, O'er the Spring (Harrison House), 5671 Railroad Avenue, Elkridge
- HO-513, Stumpner Shingled House, 5631 Railroad Avenue, Elkridge
- HO-514, Railroad Avenue Historic District, Railroad Avenue, Elkridge
- HO-515, Shipley House, 5794 Paradise Avenue, Elkridge
- HO-516, Mrs. Fairbanks House, 5776 Paradise Avenue, Elkridge
- HO-517, John Caples House, 5793 Railroad Avenue, Elkridge
- HO-518, The Shinnamon Three Double Frame Houses, 1940 Furnace Avenue, Elkridge
- HO-519, Old Christ Church Rectory (Rev. Alexander Berger House), 7110 Oakland Mills Road, Columbia
- HO-520, Collins House, 7211 Oakland Mills Road, Columbia
- HO-521, Guilford Log Cabin, site, 7451 Oakland Mills Road, Columbia
- HO-522, Savage Mill General Store (Savage Mill Company Store), 8520 Commercial Street, Savage
- HO-523, Inglehart House, Broken Land Parkway, Columbia
- HO-524, Guilford General Store & Post Office Building, 9463 Guilford Road, Columbia
- HO-525, Simpsonville Stone Ruins, Cedar Lane, Columbia
- HO-526, Jacob Wells House, ruin, Sandstone Court, Ellicott City
- HO-527, Miller Farmhouse, 5748 Montgomery Road (MD 103), Elkridge
- HO-528, Zeltman House, 7901 Old Montgomery Road, Ellicott City
- HO-529, Arnold Farmhouse, 6245 Meadowridge Road, Elkridge
- HO-530, Rowles House, 7060 Baltimore Washington Boulevard (US 1), Elkridge
- HO-531, Kraft Farm, site (Rising Sun Riding Stables), Glenmar Drive & Rising Sun Lane, Ellicott City
- HO-532, John Holland House, 9580 Baltimore Washington Boulevard (US 1), Laurel
- HO-533, Salopha, 691 River Road, Sykesville
- HO-534, Union Dam (Union Dam and Mill Race; Union Manufacturing Company Sites), National Pike (US 40), Ellicott City
- HO-535, Rudisill House, Daniels Road, Ellicott City
- HO-536, Timberlea, 4468 Old Columbia Pike, Ellicott City
- HO-537, John R. Clarke Farmhouse, Twin Knolls Road, Columbia
- HO-538, Marks-Lough House (Profits End, 4881 Montgomery Road (MD 103), Ellicott City
- HO-539, Burlap Manor (Morning Choice #2), 6760 Norris Lane, Elkridge
- HO-540, Olney Tenant House, 6851 Norris Lane, Elkridge
- HO-541, Banavie, 6810 Norris Lane, Elkridge
- HO-542, Brown Residence, 6275 Rockburn Hill Road, Elkridge
- HO-543, Hipsley Mill Miller's House, site (Blumenauer House), 3690 Hipsley Mill Road, Woodbine
- HO-544, Ridgeley-Bowman Farm, 3896 Hipsley Mill Road, Woodbine
- HO-545, John Layman Farmhouse (Martha Lemmon House), 3955 Hipsley Mill Road, Woodbine
- HO-546, Denton Driver Farm (Mathias Farm), 3770 Woodbine Road (MD 94), Woodbine
- HO-547, Warfield Farmhouse (Vierling-Hutchinson House), 3248 Jones Road, Woodbine
- HO-548, Humphries Tenant House (Ostola Residence), 6155 Rockburn Hill Road, Elkridge
- HO-549, George H. Otten Farmhouse (University of Maryland Animal Husbandry Farm), 5885 Waterloo Road (MD 108), Ellicott City
- HO-550, Vansant-Henderson House (Latimer House), 3782 Old Columbia Pike, Ellicott City
- HO-551, Oakland Manor Washhouse and Icehouse (The Eye of the Camel, Rose Price Cottage), 5432 Vantage Point Road, Columbia
- HO-552, The Homestead, 2260 Daisy Road, Woodbine
- HO-553, Joshua Disney Log House, 13475 Clarksville Pike (MD 108), Highland
- HO-554, Cotillion Building near Enniscorthy, 3408 Folly Quarter Road, Ellicott City
- HO-555, William Fralic House, 3917 Old Columbia Pike (MD 987), Ellicott City
- HO-556, Keewaydin Farm, 4090 Old Columbia Pike (MD 987), Ellicott City
- HO-557, Mount Misery, 8469 Hill Street, Ellicott City
- HO-558, Prestage's Folly, 3832 Old Columbia Pike (MD 987), Ellicott City
- HO-559, William Bryan House, 3997 Old Columbia Pike (MD 987), Ellicott City
- HO-560, Hoffman Farm, 12393 Frederick Road (MD 144), West Friendship
- HO-561, Bessie Hall (Ryerson House), 6095 Cedarwood Drive, Columbia
- HO-562, Roby House, 13240 Greenberry Lane, Clarksville
- HO-563, Williams House, 13110 Greenberry Lane, Clarksville
- HO-564, Williams Tenant House, 13105 Greenberry Lane, Clarksville
- HO-565, Pattison Whipps Log House, site, 7424 Oakland Mills Road, Columbia
- HO-566, Pfefferkorn House & Granary, 2797 Pfefferkorn Road, West Friendship
- HO-567, Joshua B. Day House, 14251 Triadelphia Road, Glenelg
- HO-568, Francis Shipley House, 8740 Baltimore Street, Savage
- HO-569, Waterloo Barracks, MD State Police, 7751 Baltimore Washington Boulevard (US 1), Jessup
- HO-570, Linnwood (Samuel F. Cobb House), 2327 Daniels Road, Ellicott City
- HO-571, Marlow House, 12975 Hall Shop Road, Highland
- HO-572, Howard County Times Building, Ellicott City ?
- HO-573, The Judge's Bench (Buzz Suter Building), 8385 Main Street (MD 144), Ellicott City
- HO-574, Brown-Ellicott House
- HO-575, Highland School House, site, Hall Shop Road, Highland
- HO-576, Wilde Lake Barn (Oakland Manor Barn), Hyla Brook Road, Columbia
- HO-577, Hill, Robbins, Carter's 5 shops on Main Street, 8048-8056 Main Street (MD 144), Ellicott City
- HO-578, 19th Century Black Cemetery
- HO-579, Whipps Family & Public Cemetery, St. John's Lane, Ellicott City
- HO-580, (No Title) 8490 Main Street (MD 144), Ellicott City
- HO-581, "The Pines" (Fort-Heine House) (Bernard or Barnard Fort House), 3713 Fels Lane, Ellicott City
- HO-582, Thomas Farm Tenant House, 2340 Daniels Road, Ellicott City
- HO-583, Samuel Burgess Carriage House, 8450 Main Street (MD 144), Ellicott City
- HO-584, Paternal Gift Farm 13555 Clarksville Pike (MD 108), Highland
- HO-585, Ellicott City Colored School (Colored School House), 8683 Frederick Road (MD 144), Ellicott City

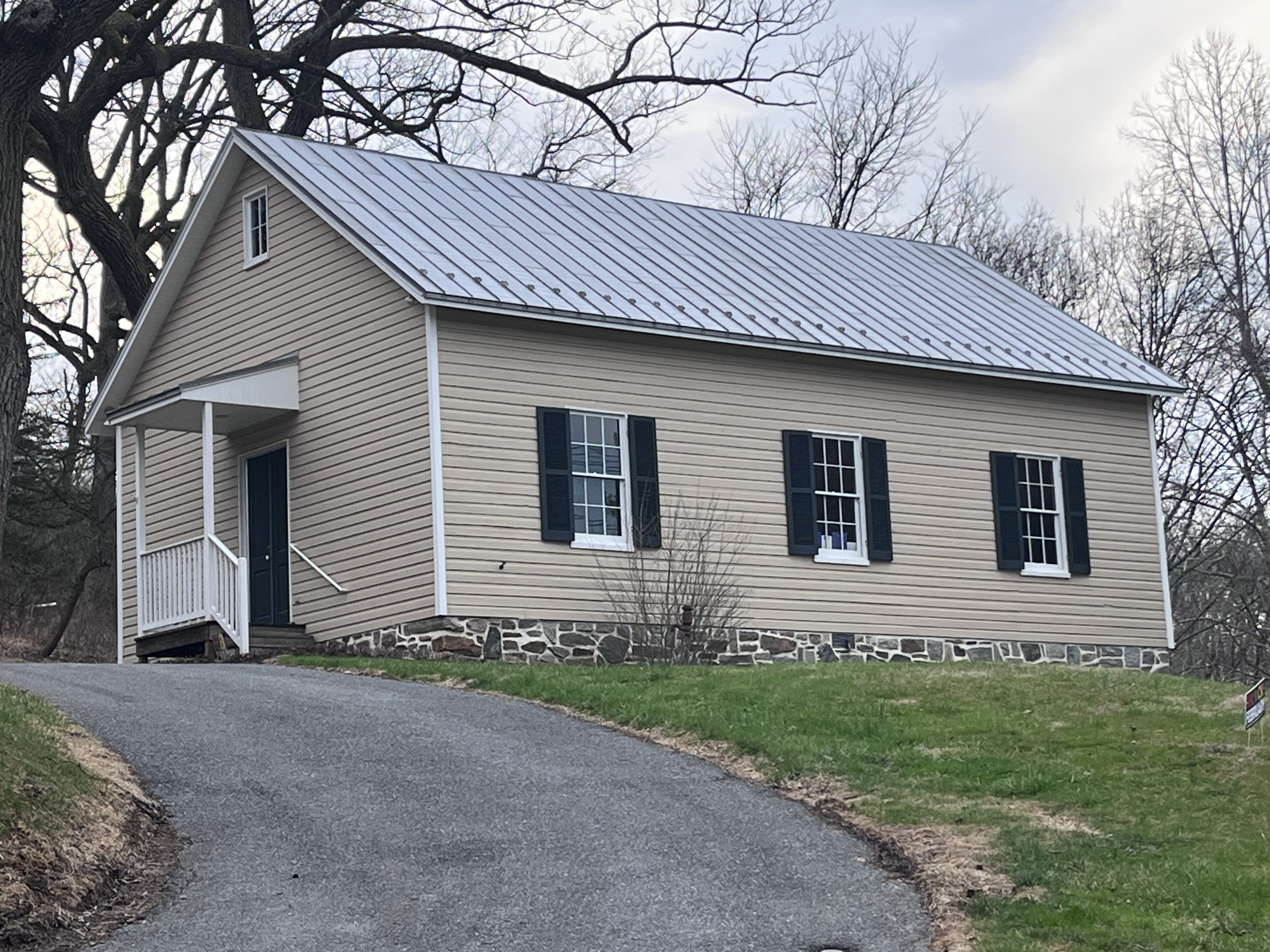
HO-585, Ellicott City Colored School

- HO-586, Katydid, 8109-8111 Main Street (MD 144), Ellicott City
- HO-587, Maple Cliffe, 4012 College Avenue (4102 Hogg Court), Ellicott City
- HO-588, Lyons House, site, Ambra Court, Ellicott City
- HO-589, Pool's Evergreen Lounge & Cabins, site, Baltimore Washington Boulevard (US 1), Elkridge
- HO-590, Rock Hill College (Rock Hill Academy), 3700 College Avenue, Ellicott City
- HO-591, National Pike Milestone No. 10, Main Street (MD 144), Ellicott City
- HO-592, National Pike Milestone No. 11, Frederick Road (MD 144), Ellicott City
- HO-593, National Pike Milestone No. 12, Frederick Road (MD 144), Ellicott City
- HO-594, National Pike Milestone No. 13, Frederick Road (MD 144), Ellicott City
- HO-595, National Pike Milestone No. 14, National Pike (US 40), Ellicott City
- HO-596, National Pike Milestone No. 15, Frederick Road (MD 144), Ellicott City
- HO-597, National Pike Milestone No. 16, Frederick Road (MD 144), Ellicott City
- HO-598, National Pike Milestone No. 17, Frederick Road (MD 144), Ellicott City
- HO-599, National Pike Milestone No. 18, Frederick Road (MD 144), Ellicott City
- HO-600, National Pike Milestone No. 20, Frederick Road (MD 144), West Friendship
- HO-601, National Pike Milestone No. 21, Frederick Road (MD 144), West Friendship
- HO-602, National Pike Milestone No. 22, Frederick Road (MD 144), Cooksville
- HO-603, National Pike Milestone No. 23, Frederick Road (MD 144), Cooksville
- HO-604, National Pike Milestone No. 24, Frederick Road (MD 144), Woodbine
- HO-605, National Pike Milestone No. 25, Frederick Road (MD 144), Woodbine
- HO-606, National Pike Milestone No. 26, Frederick Road (MD 144), Woodbine
- HO-607, National Pike Milestone No. 27, Frederick Road (MD 144), Mount Airy
- HO-608, National Pike Milestone No. 28, Frederick Road (MD 144), Mount Airy
- HO-609, Church Road and Sylvan Lane Survey District, Church Road & Sylvan Lane, Ellicott City
- HO-610, Lawyers Hill Historic District, Elkridge
- HO-611, Kendig House, 2622 N. Rogers Avenue, Ellicott City
- HO-612, Eklof House & Store (Brun House), 2628 N. Rogers Avenue, Ellicott City
- HO-613, Jacques House, 2796 Rogers Avenue (MD 99), Ellicott City
- HO-614, Hoolachan House, 2750 N. Ridge Road, Ellicott City
- HO-615, Rogers House, 2874 Rogers Avenue (MD 99), Ellicott City
- HO-616, Feaga House, 2835 Rogers Avenue (MD 99), Ellicott City
- HO-617, Radcliffe House, 3052 Rogers Avenue (MD 99), Ellicott City
- HO-618, Moxley House, 2965 Rogers Avenue (MD 99), Ellicott City
- HO-619, Jonestown Road Bridge, Rogers Avenue (MD 99), Ellicott City
- HO-620, Warfield/Flanerty Property, 2635 Daisy Road, Daisy
- HO-621, Flurrie House, 4065 Old Columbia Pike (MD 987), Ellicott City
- HO-622, Massey House, 4001 Old Columbia Pike (MD 987), Ellicott City
- HO-623, Nelson House, 3911 Nelson House Road (3992 Old Columbia Pike), Ellicott City
- HO-624, Casciaro House, 4120 Sears House Court (3979 Old Columbia Pike), Ellicott City
- HO-625, Lutz House, 3978 Old Columbia Pike (MD 987), Ellicott City
- HO-626, Farmer/Kittner House, 3966 Old Columbia Pike (MD 987), Ellicott City
- HO-627, Shearn House, 3916 Old Columbia Pike (MD 987), Ellicott City
- HO-628, Fulton House, 3926 Old Columbia Pike (MD 987), Ellicott City
- HO-629, Merson House, 3922 Old Columbia Pike (MD 987), Ellicott City
- HO-630, Bohning House, 3962 Old Columbia Pike (MD 987), Ellicott City
- HO-631, Hollifield House, 8262 Old Frederick Road, Ellicott City
- HO-632, Pfeiffer House, 3887 Old Columbia Pike (MD 987), Ellicott City
- HO-633, Reed House, 3873 Old Columbia Pike (MD 987), Ellicott City
- HO-634, McLaughlin-Delisa House, 3909 Hunter Road, Ellicott City
- HO-635, Harrison House, 3872 Old Columbia Pike (MD 987), Ellicott City
- HO-636, Robinson Farm, site (Goldstein-Johnson Property), 6692 Cedar Lane, Simpsonville
- HO-637, Confederate Monument, Circuit Court Building, Ellicott City
- HO-638, Buckley Farm House, site, Old Montgomery Road, Columbia
- HO-639, Howard's Family Homeplace for Free Slaves, Meadowridge Road (MD 103), Elkridge
- HO-640, Jacob Zeltman Farm (Zeltman Horse Stables), Marshalee Lane, Elkridge
- HO-641, Bridge (SHA 13038), Roxbury Mills Road (MD 97) over Patuxent River, Brookeville
- HO-642, Shipley House, site (in Alpha Ridge Park), 11685 Old Frederick Road (MD 99), Marriottsville
- HO-643, Warfield-Sullivan House, 3625 Andrea Drive, West Friendship
- HO-644, Ridgely Tenant House, site, 3615 Ivory Road, Glenelg
- HO-645, Milton Shipley House, 2920 Sykesville Road (MD 32), West Friendship
- HO-646, Mary Selby Burgess House (Burgess-Sullivan House), 3075 Sykesville Road (MD 32), West Friendship
- HO-647, Edward Talbott Clark Farm Buildings Complex, site, 4296 Montgomery Road (MD 103), Ellicott City
- HO-648, Perrin's Tenant House, site, Marshalee Drive, Elkridge
- HO-649, Bridge (SHA 13032), National Pike (US 40) over Little Patuxent River, Ellicott City
- HO-650, Bridge 13041, Dorsey Road (MD 176) over Deep Run, Elkridge
- HO-651, SHA Bridge No. HO-29 (Bridge No. HO 29), Triadelphia Mill Road over Patuxent River, Dayton
- HO-652, Bridge (SHA HO-0061), Athol Avenue over Deep Run, Elkridge
- HO-653, Bridge (SHA HO-0101), Frederick Road over Hudson Branch, Ellicott City
- HO-654, Bridge (SHA HO-0102), Woodland Road over tributary of Little Patuxent River, Ellicott City
- HO-655, Bridge (SHA HO-0110,), Henryton Road over tributary of Patapsco River, Marriottsville
- HO-656, Bridge (SHA 130034), National Pike (US 40) over Forest Road, Ellicott City
- HO-657, Bridge (SHA HO-6), River Road over Rockburn Branch, Elkridge
- HO-658, Bridge (SHA HO-13), Stephens Road over Hammond Branch, Laurel
- HO-659, Bridge (SHA HO-15), Murray Hill Road over Middle Patuxent River, Laurel
- HO-660, Bridge (SHA HO-31), Pfefferkorn Road over Middle Patuxent River, West Friendship
- HO-661, Bridge (SHA HO-32), Shady Lane over Dorsey Branch, Glenwood
- HO-662, Bridge (SHA HO-35), Hipsley Mill Road over Cabin Branch, Woodbine
- HO-663, Bridge (SHA HO-38), Daisy Road over Little Cattail Creek, Woodbine
- HO-664, Bridge (SHA HO-41), Daisy Road over Cattail Creek, Woodbine
- HO-665, Bridge (SHA HO-48), Bethany Lane over Little Patuxent River, Ellicott City
- HO-666, Bridge (SHA HO-55), Old Montgomery Road over Little Patuxant, Columbia
- HO-667, Bridge (SHA HO-62), Mayfield Avenue over Deep Run, Elkridge
- HO-668, Bridge (SHA HO-106), Pindell School Road over Hammond Branch, Fulton
- HO-669, Bridge (SHA HO-107), Tiber Alley over Tiber River, Ellicott City
- HO-670, Bridge (SHA HO-108), Sanner Road over branch of Middle Patuxent River, Clarksville
- HO-671, Bridge (SHA 13029), Guilford Road (MD 732) over B&O Railroad/MD 732 over CSX, Annapolis Junction
- HO-672, SHA Small Structure 13055X0, Frederick Road (MD 144) over Branch of Cattail Creek, Lisbon
- HO-673, Bridge (SHA 13046), Sykesville Road (MD 32) over Patapsco River, River Road & Railroad, Sykesville
- HO-674, Methodist Church,
- HO-675, John Hines Farmstead,
- HO-676, John D. Harp Barn (Windridge Farm Barn), 14564 Dorsey Mill Road, Glenwood
- HO-677, Bridge (SHA HO-2), Bonnie Branch Road over Bonnie Branch, Ellicott City
- HO-678, Bridge (SHA HO-53), Henryton Road over tributary of Patapsco River, Marriottsville
- HO-679, Bridge (SHA HO-105)Henryton Road over tributary of Patapsco River, Marriottsville
- HO-680, Bridge No. HO-132 (Old Columbia Pike over Tiber River), Old Columbia Pike over Tiber River, Ellicott City
- HO-681, Bridge (SHA 13037), Roxbury Mills Road (MD 97) over Cattail Creek, Glenwood
- HO-682, 8489 Heatherwold Drive, Laurel
- HO-683, 10905 Johns Hopkins Road, Laurel
- HO-684, 10935 Johns Hopkins Road, Laurel
- HO-685, 10945 Johns Hopkins Road, Laurel
- HO-686, 11139 Johns Hopkins Road, site, 11139 Johns Hopkins Road, Laurel
- HO-687, 8321 Leishear Road, site, 8321 Leishear Road, Laurel
- HO-688, 8449 Leishear Road, Laurel
- HO-689, 8466 Leishear Road, Laurel
- HO-690, 8474 Leishear Road, Laurel
- HO-691, 8477 Leishear Road, Laurel
- HO-692, 8482 Leishear Road, Laurel
- HO-693, Melvin and Myrtle Scaggs House, 8430 Old Columbia Road (originally inventoried as 8430 Murphy Road), Laurel
- HO-694, 8555 Murphy Road, Laurel
- HO-695, Old Columbia Road Bridge (SHA HO-64), Old Columbia Road over Middle Patuxent River, Columbia
- HO-696, 8371 Old Columbia Road, Laurel
- HO-697, 8377 Old Columbia Road, Laurel
- HO-698, 8431 Old Columbia Road, Laurel
- HO-699, 8450 Old Columbia Road, Laurel
- HO-700, Country Corner, 10570 Scaggsville Road, Laurel
- HO-701, 10571 Scaggsville Road, Laurel
- HO-702, 10578 Scaggsville Road, Laurel
- HO-703, Welsh's School (Highridge School), 10623 Scaggsville Road, Laurel
- HO-704, 10643 Scaggsville Road, Laurel
- HO-705, 10671 Scaggsville Road, Laurel
- HO-706, 10710 Scaggsville Road, Laurel
- HO-707,(site), 10732 Scaggsville Road, Laurel
- HO-708, Emmanuel Methodist Church, 10755 Scaggsville Road, Laurel
- HO-709, 10756 Scaggsville Road, Laurel
- HO-710, Arthue E. Scaggs House, 10763 Scaggsville Road, Laurel
- HO-711, 10787 Scaggsville Road, Laurel
- HO-712, John L. Hines House, 10909 Scaggsville Road, Laurel
- HO-713, 10919A Scaggsville Road, Laurel
- HO-714, 10919B Scaggsville Road, Laurel
- HO-715, 10961 Scaggsville Road, Laurel
- HO-716, 10964 Scaggsville Road, Laurel
- HO-717, 11125 Scaggsville Road, site, 11125 Scaggsville Road, Laurel
- HO-718, 11268 Scaggsville Road, Laurel
- HO-719, 11295 Scaggsville Road, site, 11295 Scaggsville Road, Laurel
- HO-720, Whetzel Farm, site, 11425 Scaggsville Road, Fulton
- HO-721, Wessel Farm, site, 11460 Scaggsville Road, Fulton
- HO-722, 10560 Shaker Drive, Columbia
- HO-723, 10600 Shaker Drive, site, 10600 Shaker Drive, Columbia
- HO-724, William Blackstone Log House, site, 3597 Centennial Lane, Ellicott City
- HO-725, Bridge (SHA HO-8), Sheppard Lane over Middle Patuxent River, Ellicott City
- HO-726, Bridge (SHA HO-20), Folly Quarter Road over Middle Patuxent River, Ellicott City
- HO-727, Bridge (SHA HO-49), Frederick Road over Little Patuxent River, Ellicott City
- HO-728, Bridge (SHA 13003), Baltimore Washington Boulevard (US 1) over Deep Run, Elkridge
- HO-729, Bridge (SHA 13007), Baltimore Washington Boulevard (US 1 SB) over Little Patuxent River, Savage
- HO-730, Bridge (SHA 13026) Pedestrian bridge over Middle Patuxent River, Pedestrian bridge over Middle Patuxent River, Simpsonville
- HO-731, Bridge (SHA HO-30), Roxbury Road & Dorsey Mill Road over Dorsey Branch, Glenwood
- HO-733, Patapsco Quarry Company Sites, Mulligans Hill Lane, Ellicott City
- HO-734, Gray's Station Water Sites, Ellicott City
- HO-735, Thomas House, Ellicott City
- HO-736, Williams Run Water Station Sites, Ellicott City
- HO-737, Ilchester Mill/Dismal Mill Sites, Ellicott City
- HO-738, Bonnie Branch Mill Site, Bonnie Branch Road & River Rd. (SW corner), Ellicott City
- HO-739, Davis Mills, Bonnie Branch Road, Ellicott City
- HO-740, Hockley Forge and Mill Sites, Levering Avenue, Elkridge
- HO-741, Bridge (SHA HO-111), Sylvan Lane over tributary of Sucker Branch, Ellicott City
- HO-742, Guilford Industrial Historic District, Located off of Old Guilford Road, directly east of Route 32, Columbia
- HO-742-1, Spano Family House, 9201 Old Guilford Road, Columbia
- HO-743, Foundations off of Annapolis Rock Road, off of Annapolis Rock Road, Woodbine
- HO-744, Anderson Farm, 2107 Long Corner Road, Mount Airy
- HO-745, Abandoned Farm Complex, Long Corner Road, Mount Airy
- HO-746, Hilton Farm, 3780 Woodbine Road (MD 94), Woodbine
- HO-747, Maycroft Tenant House & Detached Kitchen, 6064 Old Lawyers Hill Road, Elkridge
- HO-748, 6170 Lawyers Hill Road, Elkridge
- HO-749, 6195 Lawyers Hill Road, Elkridge
- HO-750, Small Structure 13084XO, Woodbine Road (MD 94) over Lisbons Little Creek, Woodbine
- HO-751, Howard Cotton Factory (Apple Butter Factory, Sykes Mill, B.F. Shriver Cannery) 350 Sykesville Road (MD 32), Sykesville
- HO-752, Ellicott City Post Office, 8267 Main Street (MD 144), Ellicott City
- HO-753, Small Structure 13166XO, MD 983 over Tributary of Patuxent River, Laurel
- HO-754, William Meade Farm, 12955 Frederick Road (MD 144), West Friendship
- HO-755, Sykesville Creamery, site, Forsythe Road & West Friendship Road (MD 851), Sykesville
- HO-756, St. Luke's Church, 350 River Road, Sykesville
- HO-757, Small Structure 13063XO, Frederick Road (MD 144) over Tributary of Cattail Creek, Woodbine
- HO-758, Bridge 13155, South Entrance Road over Little Patuxent River, Columbia
- HO-759, Patapsco State Park, Halethorpe/Catons/Ell City/Gwynn Oak
- HO-759-1, Randall-Reese-Umbach Lime Kiln, 880 Marriottsville Road, Marriottsville
- HO-760, Patuxent River State Park
- HO-760, Patuxent River State Park,
- HO-761, House, 5004 Ilchester Road, Ellicott City
- HO-762, House, 5761 Elkridge Heights Road, Elkridge
- HO-763, House, 3600 Fels Lane, Ellicott City
- HO-764, Open Number,
- HO-765, House, Frederick Road (MD 144) & Sykesville Road (MD 32), SW corner, West Friendship
- HO-766, African-American Episcopal Church, Merryman Street (south side) before intersection with Hill Street, Ellicott City
- HO-767, Enchanted Forest (Enchanted Forest Theme Park), 10040 Baltimore National Pike (US 40), Ellicott City
- HO-768, House, MD 144 south side, just west of Centennial Lane,
- HO-769, House, 8957 Frederick Road (MD 144), Ellicott City
- HO-770, Killarney (Good Fellowship, Cavey Farm), 10375 Cavey Lane, Woodstock
- HO-771, 13800 Russell Zepp Drive, Clarksville
- HO-772, 8064 Baltimore Washington Boulevard, site, 8064 Baltimore Washington Boulevard (US 1), Jessup
- HO-773, 8070 Baltimore Washington Boulevard (US 1), Jessup
- HO-774, 8104 Baltimore Washington Boulevard (US 1), Jessup
- HO-775, Bridge 13022, MD 32 over Middle Patuxent River, West Friendship
- HO-776, Bridge 13024, MD 32 over Middle Patuxent River, Clarksville
- HO-777, Bridge 13025, MD 32 over Middle Patuxent River, Clarksville
- HO-778, Small Structure X13001, Frederick Road (MD 144) over Haymeadow Branch, Mount Airy
- HO-779, Small Structure 13064XO, Frederick Road (MD 144) over small branch of Middle Patuxent River, Woodbine
- HO-780, Small Structure 13081XO over Tributary of Cattail Creek, Woodbine
- HO-781, Ellicott Mills Middle School, site, 4445 Montgomery Road (MD 103), Ellicott City
- HO-782, Gorman Road Survey District, Laurel
- HO-783, Loudon Avenue Culvert, Loudon Avenue over unnamed tributary of Shallow Run, Hanover
- HO-784, Elkridge Landing Historic District, Main St, Railroad Ave, Paradise Ave, Furnace Ave, Elkridge
- HO-785, Levering Avenue Survey District, 5471-5590 Levering Avenue, Elkridge
- HO-786, Anderson Post Office & Dwelling, Cugle House, 6480 Anderson Avenue, Hanover
- HO-787, Samuel Norris House, 6611 Railroad Street, Hanover
- HO-788, First Discovery, Winters House, 6270 Winters Lane, Hanover
- HO-789, Reilly-McNamara House, site 6322 Winters Lane, Hanover
- HO-790, Hugg-Thomas Wildlife Management Area, Sykesville
- HO-791, Taylor House, 6150 Hanover Road, Hanover
- HO-792, House, 6470 Anderson Avenue, Hanover
- HO-793, Anderson Brick House, 6449 Anderson Avenue, Hanover
- HO-794, Matthews House, 6280 Mound Street, Hanover
- HO-795, Bender/Binder Farm, 6771 Dorsey Road (MD 176), Elkridge
- HO-796, Bond-Webb House, site (Thomas D. Bond House), 9410 All Saints Road, Laurel
- HO-797, Tutbury Gardeners Cottage, 6450 Elibank Drive, Elkridge
- HO-798, Claremont, 5840 Claremont Drive (formerly 6051 Lawyers Hill Road), Elkridge
- HO-799, House, 525 Baltimore Avenue, Laurel
- HO-800, Mount Moriah Lodge No. 7, Guilford Road, Annapolis Junction/Jessup
- HO-801, Joseph Travers House, 9309 Whiskey Bottom Road, Laurel
- HO-802, Stone Boundary Wall Fragment behind 4635 Ilchester Road, Ellicott City
- HO-803, Old Washington Road Survey District, Old Washington, Augustine, Montgomery, Downs Roads, Elkridge
- HO-804, George Hobbs House & Store, 6179 Old Washington Road, Elkridge
- HO-805, Hobbs House, 6181 Old Washington Road, Elkridge
- HO-806, Old Elkridge Schoolhouse, 6317 Old Washington Road, Elkridge
- HO-807, Hartke Double House, 6301 & 6305 Old Washington Road, Elkridge
- HO-808, House, 6415 Loudon Avenue, Elkridge
- HO-809, House, 6615 Highland Avenue, Elkridge
- HO-810, Hopkins-Roberts-Hood House, site, 6650 Highland Avenue, Elkridge
- HO-811, House, 6443 Harthorne Avenue, Elkridge
- HO-812, House, 6754 Athol Avenue, Elkridge
- HO-813, House, 7011 Lennox Avenue, Elkridge
- HO-814, Walter and Gertrude Dixon House, 7024 Cedar Avenue (Lennox Park), Elkridge
- HO-815, House, 7032 Cedar Avenue, Elkridge
- HO-816, House, 6901 Linden Avenue, Elkridge
- HO-817, House, 6909 Linden Avenue, Elkridge
- HO-818, The (Albert W. and Helen M.) Cornick Property (Sams Inc.; Sam and Elsie's Restaurant), 9994 Washington Boulevard (US 1), Laurel
- HO-819, The (Harry and Fulton) Gordon Property (McMillan Marine; "Sappington's Sweep"), 10140 Washington Boulevard (US 1), Laurel
- HO-820, Charles & Gertrude Russell House, site, 9533 N. Laurel Road, Laurel
- HO-821, The Haller Property ("Rocway Towers"; Truckmax Auto Sales, Inc; "Woodcroft"), 9921 Washington Boulevard (US 1), Laurel
- HO-822, The Picket Property (Allstate Insurance Office; White's Contrivance), 8826 Washington Boulevard (US 1), Jessup
- HO-823, The Cornelius W. Pickett Property (Garage) (J & D Auto Service; White's Contrivance), 8802 Washington Boulevard (US 1), Jessup
- HO-824, The Joseph & Irene Buncke Property (Eastern Stair and Woodwork), 8402 Washington Boulevard (US 1), Laurel
- HO-825, The Michael Bucheck Property, site (Cherry Hill Construction, Inc.), 8211 Washington Boulevard (US 1), Jessup
- HO-1185, Hopkins United Methodist Church, 13250 Highland Road, Highland
- HO-1186, Highland Colored Elementary School, 13230 Highland Road, Highland
