= Dorseyville =

Dorseyville may refer to a location in the United States:

- Dorseyville, Louisiana
- Dorseyville, Maryland
- Dorseyville, Pennsylvania
