= Roxbury Mill =

- Location within Maryland
- 39°25′00″N 77°05′00″W

History
- Built: 1753

Site notes
- Architectural style: Wood Mill

Roxbury Mill is a historic flour and grist mill located in Glenwood, Howard County, Maryland, now part of the Howard County Farm Museum.

== Location ==
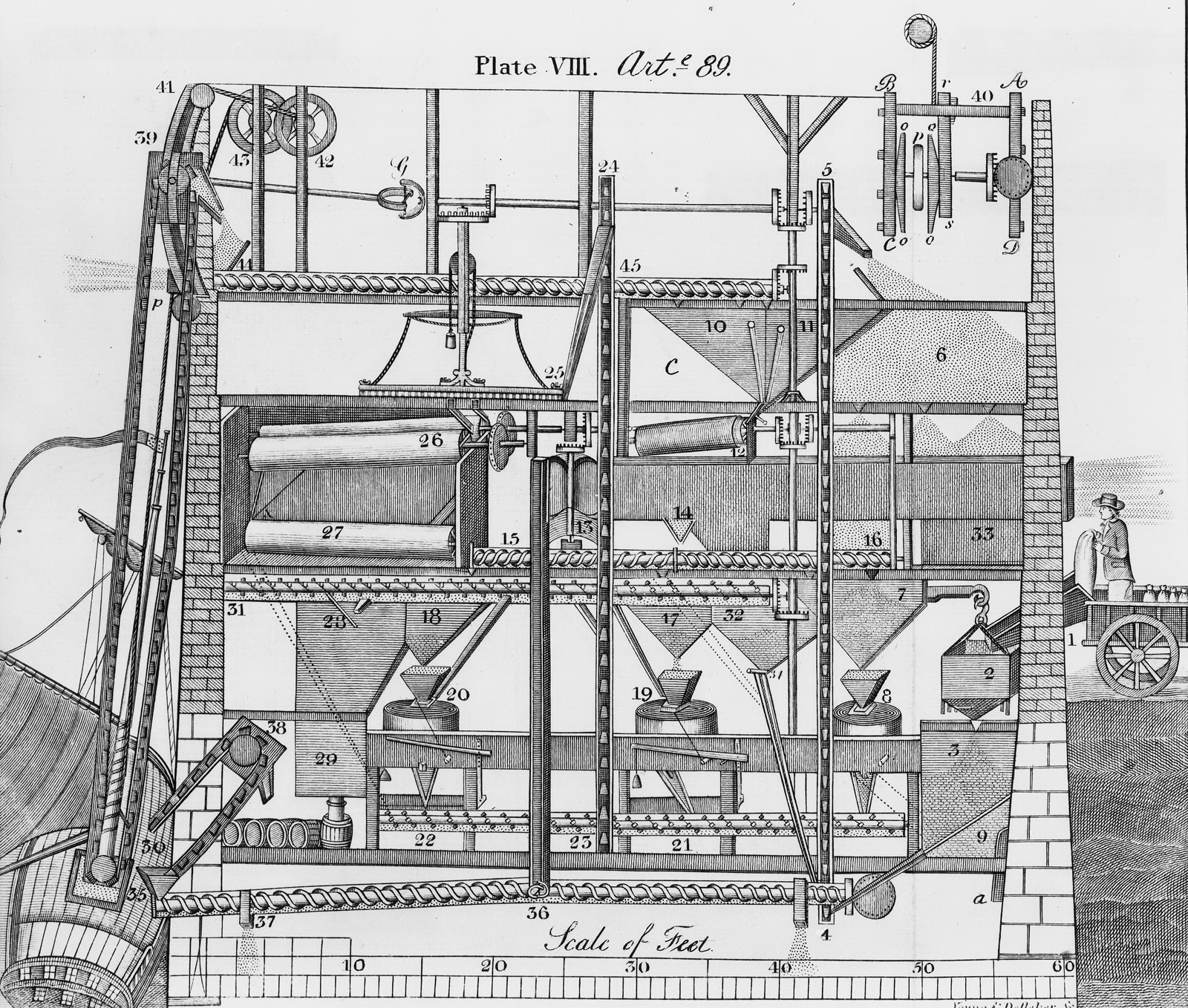
An example of an automated mill

The Roxbury Mill is located next to the Catt Tale (Cat Tail) river and with construction starting in 1753 by Capt. Philemon Dorsey Richard and John Dorsey settled plantations near the site in 1776.

== History ==
The 1 1/2-story stone mill with cellar was completed after 1791. It used an Oliver Evans licensed automated milling process that cost $20 at the time. Samuel Thomas paid $800 in damages to Evans in April 1818 for using the technology without a license. In 1850, the mill owned by Allen Bowie Davis was in full production with two employees and one packer producing 125,000 lb of meal and 25,000 lb of chop flour on three wheels.

The Dorsey family sent slaves from Roxbury Mills in their place during the Civil War Draft. In 1874 it was sold to George Peddicord. A waterwheel and gears made of steel replaced the wood construction in 1917. Ray Higgins and later owner Ray Smallwood Sr. ( -1958) operated bootleg distilleries at the mill and Miller's house from the 1920s to the 1950s that were raided at least once. The mill remained in operation until 1962. The mill was stabilized with a metal roof, but fell into a period of purposeful neglect with mill race and roof damage following the 1972 Hurricane Agnes.

The widow Irene Smallwood felt that donating the property to the Maryland Historical Society would not raise enough money and resold the property before her death in 1992. The Grover family pursued county funds to restore the building, but were ordered by the county in 1993 to stabilize the structure or tear it down. In 2002, the mill was dismantled "due to safety issues and concerns about vandalism". The property was subdivided into 1 acre. The foundation was left onsite, with components shipped to the Howard County Antique Farm Machinery Club for reassembly which has not been started.

A store was built next to the mill in 1825 operated by J.D. Matthews.The Roxbury Mills Miller's House sits diagonally across from the original mill site on a 7-acre site that was once part of the "Vanity Mount", "Duvall's Range" and "Hard to get and Dear Paid for" land patents. The log core of the house was built prior to 1820 with shingle siding and an L-shaped addition and a wood-framed barn-carriage house outbuilding. In 1929, the property was purchased by Raymond and Irene Small as the "Roxbury Farm" and was later reduced to 5 acres.

The Wilson house dates to the same period as the Miller's House, once owned by Allen Bowie Davis. The house is built around a log cabin core that was once a slave quarter.

== See also ==
- List of Howard County properties in the Maryland Historical Trust
- Dorseyville, Maryland
