= The Oaks (Ellicott City, Maryland) =

- Location within Maryland
- 39°16′54″N 76°47′31″W
- Location: Ellicott City, Maryland

History
- Built: 1700s, 1857

Site notes
- Architect: Robert Hale
- Architectural style: Italiante

The Oaks is a historic home and slave plantation located in Ellicott City, Howard County, Maryland (considered Elkridge, near Ellicott's Mills when built).

The house is situated on a land tract named Joshua's Addition patented in 1723 by Joshua Sewall fronting an Indian trail latter named Claggett Road. In 1778 Thomas Cockey sold the land to John Merriken. The land passed to Caleb Dorsey who sold it to the Hare family in 1840. The property featured a cedar tree walkway dated to 1789. An original eighteenth-century stone house was modified to a flat-roofed Italiante structure in 1856 by ship captain Robert H Hare, who also built and lived at the Linwood building. In 1864, Jehanne Elvira Hopkins moved from the South with her slaves and bought the land including Mt. Misery and Oeall Enlarged. A tenant house and slave quarters collapsed in the 1960s. On May 14, 2015, a fire broke out in the structure at 11 am.

== See also ==
- List of Howard County properties in the Maryland Historical Trust
- Linwood Center
