= Wavertree (Maryland) =

- Interactive map of the Wavertree area
- Former names: Howard's Resolution

General information
- Type: House
- Architectural style: Federal
- Location: Glenelg, Maryland, US
- Coordinates: 39°16′05″N 76°57′03″W
- Construction started: ca.1810

Wavertree or Howards Resolution is a historic home located in Glenelg, Maryland, United States. The estate was first surveyed as "Howard's Second Discovery" by Henry Howard in 1712. It is notable as the family seat of the prominent Iglehart family. Tilgman Iglehart built the federal style stone house in the federal style. Tilgman along with other family members are buried onsite in a family grave. The name Wavertree comes from a later owner, Colonel Leven Gale, who had ancestors in Wavertree, England. As with many pre-colonial buildings of the region, the fieldstone structure was a later addition attached to an older log structure. in 1938, the log structure section was removed from deterioration. The building was acquired in 1973 by Howard County for a park, but was returned to private ownership to Robert Watson by 1974 and Charles R. Miller Jr by 1978. The property is currently surrounded by Benson Branch Park.

== See also ==
- List of Howard County properties in the Maryland Historical Trust
- Iglehart House (Columbia, Maryland)
- Iglehart
- Iglehart, Maryland
