= Montrose (Clarksville, Maryland) =

Historic house in Maryland, United States

- U.S. National Register of Historic Places
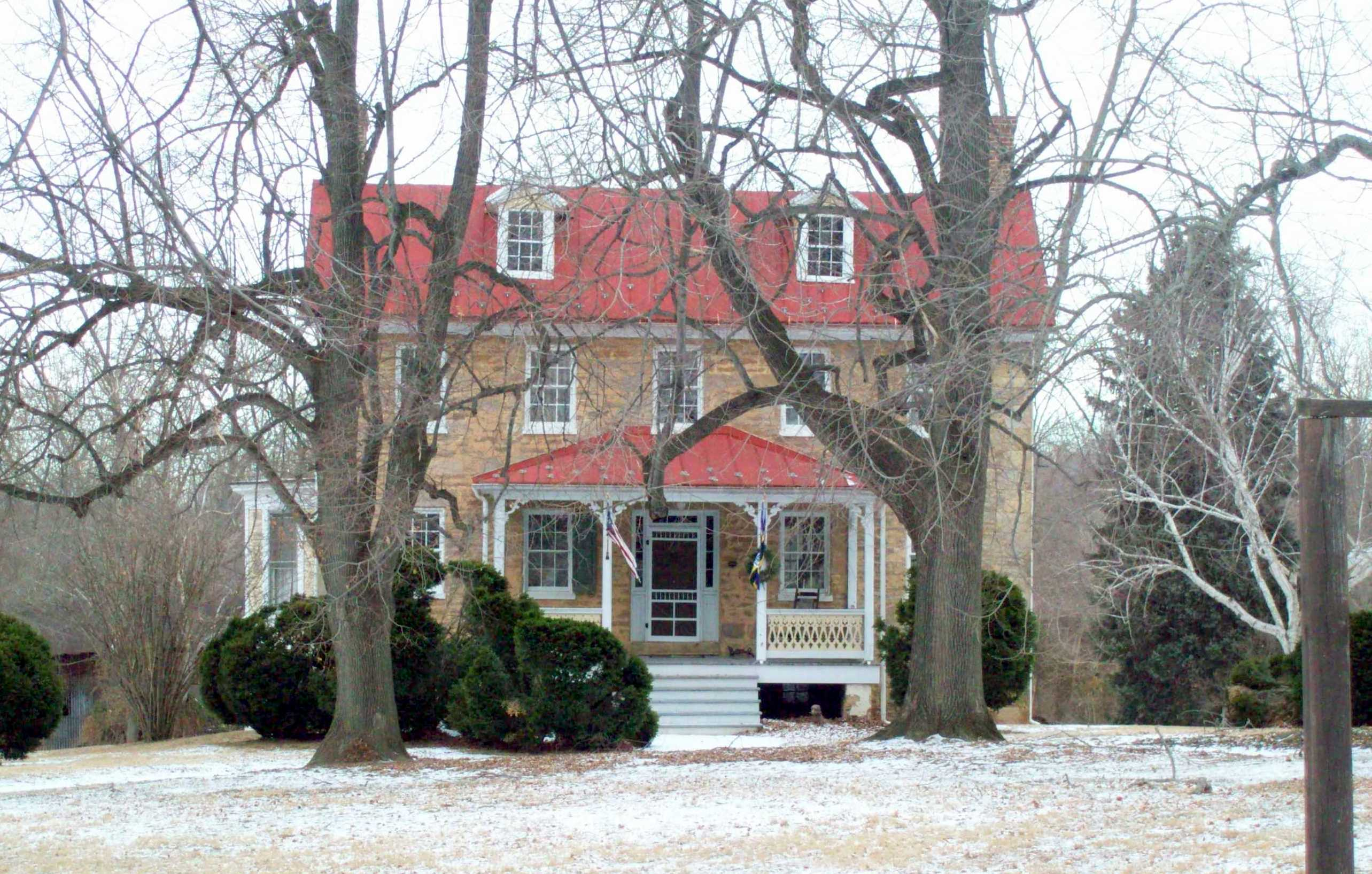
- Montrose, January 2011

- Location within Maryland Location within the United States
- Location: 13370 Brighton Dam Road, Clarksville, Maryland
- Coordinates: 39°12′4″N 76°58′39″W
- Area: 4.2 acres (1.7 ha)
- Built: 1844
- NRHP reference No.: 00001506
- Added to NRHP: December 13, 2000

Montrose is a historic slave plantation located at Clarksville, Howard County, Maryland, United States. It was built in 1844 by Dr. William H. Hardey, prominent physician and secessionist in the American Civil War. One of Dr. Hardey's six children married John Randall, brother of James Ryder Randall, the author of "Maryland, My Maryland!" The house is basically a five-bay-wide, two-bay-deep, and 2 1/2-story stone structure with two dormers set into the gable roof on its south elevation and wide brick chimneys set into its east and west walls. A shingled 1 1/2-story cottage lies north of Montrose with barns and outbuildings lying northwest of them both.

Montrose resides next to Huntington Farms, a house built by his brother John T. Hardey. The farm has been subdivided to 4.2 acres for residential construction, with the gravesite for the family and slaves located between two pipe-stem driveways for the development.

Montrose was listed on the National Register of Historic Places in 2000.

== See also ==
- List of Howard County properties in the Maryland Historical Trust
- Huntington Farms
