= Meriweather (Glenelg, Maryland) =

- Location within Maryland
- 39°15′30″N 77°01′53″W
- Nearest city: Glenelg, Maryland

History
- Built: 1805

Site notes
- Elevation: 880 feet (270 m)
- Architectural style: Vernacular Stone

Meriweather Plantation, now known as the Butler House, is a historic slave plantation house in Glenelg, Howard County, Maryland

The Meriweather Manor was built by Henry Meriweather in 1805. The two-story stone building is five bays wide. In 1840 the house was purchased by Samuel T. Ownings, who added 201 and 20 acre parcels to the property in 1865. In 1868, the Dorsey family inherited the property. The Owings family later inherited the property, selling it to Joshua Owings for $5,500. The site is the location of the Howard County Hunt Club Race. In 1950 a fire gutted the staircase, which was rebuilt. Most of the farm has been subdivided for residential development.

== See also ==
- List of Howard County properties in the Maryland Historical Trust
