= St. Mark's Episcopal Church (Highland, Maryland) =

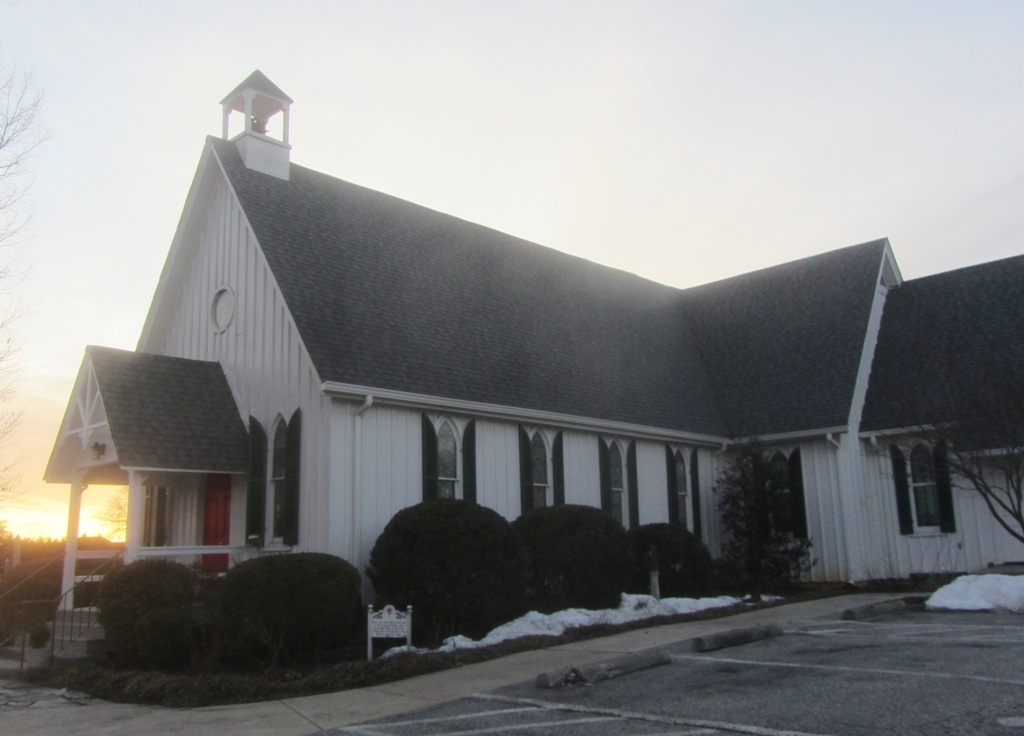
- St. Mark's Episcopal Church

- Location within Maryland
- 39°10′21.1″N 76°57′10.3″W
- Nearest city: Highland, Maryland

History
- Built: 1874

Site notes
- Area: 12,700 ha (31,000 acres)
- Architectural style: Gothic

St. Mark's Episcopal Church is a historic church located in Highland, Maryland, in Howard County, Maryland, United States.

The church is a wood-framed building three bays wide by four bays deep built in 1874. An L-shaped parish house was built on the property next to the church in 1955. The pews were capable of holding 120 persons. An adjoining rectory was added in 1964.

== See also ==
- List of Howard County properties in the Maryland Historical Trust
