= First Presbyterian Church (Ellicott City, Maryland) =

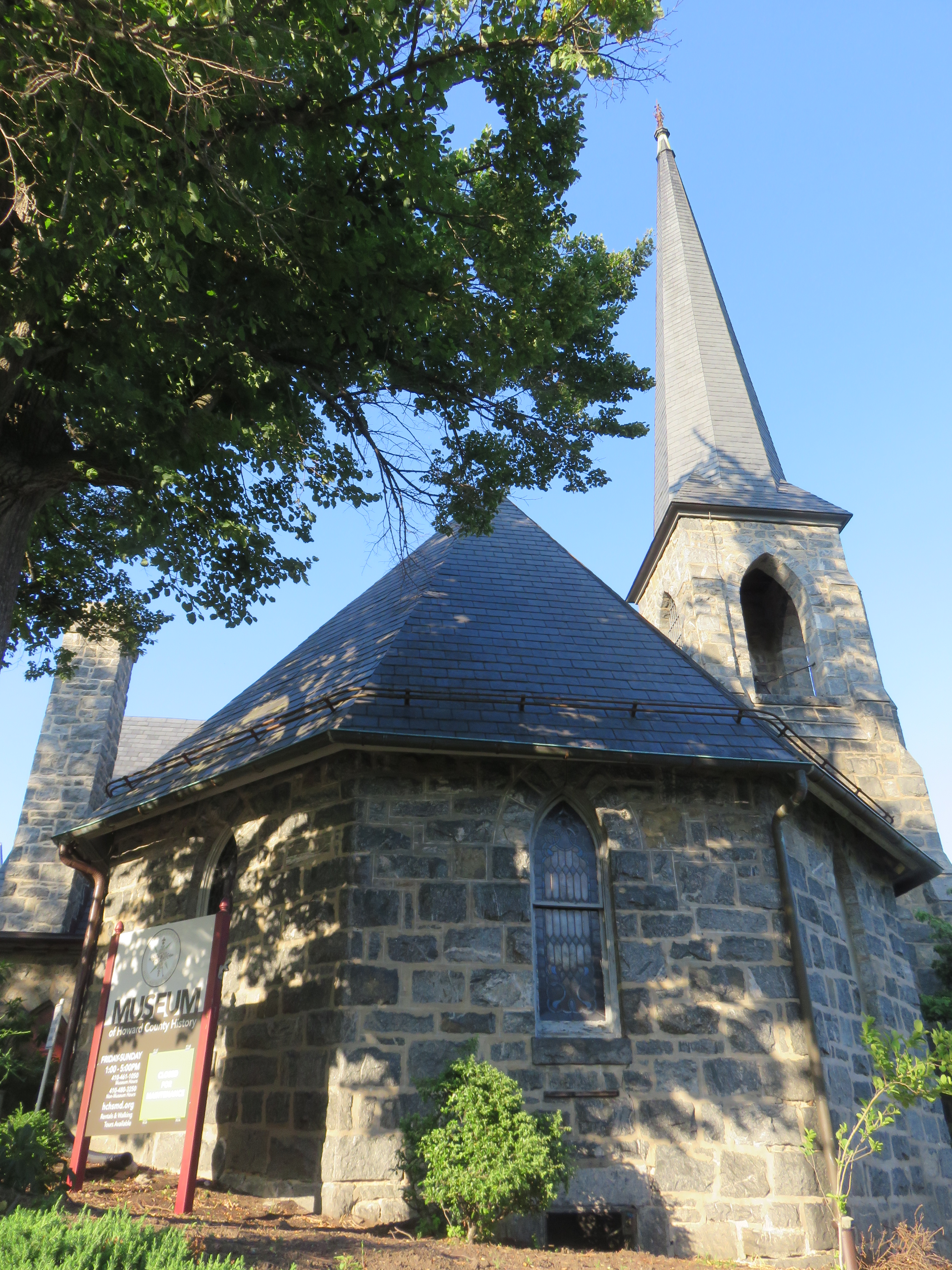
- The building in 2020, now the Museum of Howard County History

- Location within Maryland
- 39°16′05″N 76°47′54″W
- Location: 8328 Court Avenue, Ellicott City, Maryland

History
- Built: 1842, 1892

Site notes
- Architect: George Archer (rebuild)
- Architectural style: Gothic Revival

First Presbyterian Church is a historic church in Ellicott City, Howard County, Maryland adjacent to the Howard County Circuit Courthouse. The church is a cruciform-shaped structure made of granite stone construction. The building was expanded and rebuilt after a basement collapse during construction in April 1894. The congregation relocated in 1960. Mrs. James A. Clark, Sr. purchased the church and donated it to the Howard County Historic Society.

== See also ==
- List of Howard County properties in the Maryland Historical Trust
