= New Year's Gift =

Property in Glenwood, Maryland, US

- Location within Maryland
- 39°16′04.0″N 77°02′41.8″W
- Nearest city: Cooksville, Maryland

History
- Built: 1738

New Year's Gift or Villa de Speranza is a property located in Glenwood in Howard County, Maryland, United States.

The property consists of a log cabin built in 1730, and a larger building with a cornerstone date of 1788. The L-shaped house is built of brick construction with stucco covering. A two-story open porch supported by six columns flanks the front of the house. A two-story connection leads to a kitchen addition. The house was once owned by Dennis P. Gaither and later his son Daniel. In the late 1970s the property was subdivided to 9.9 acres.

== See also ==
- List of Howard County properties in the Maryland Historical Trust
