= Huntington Farms =

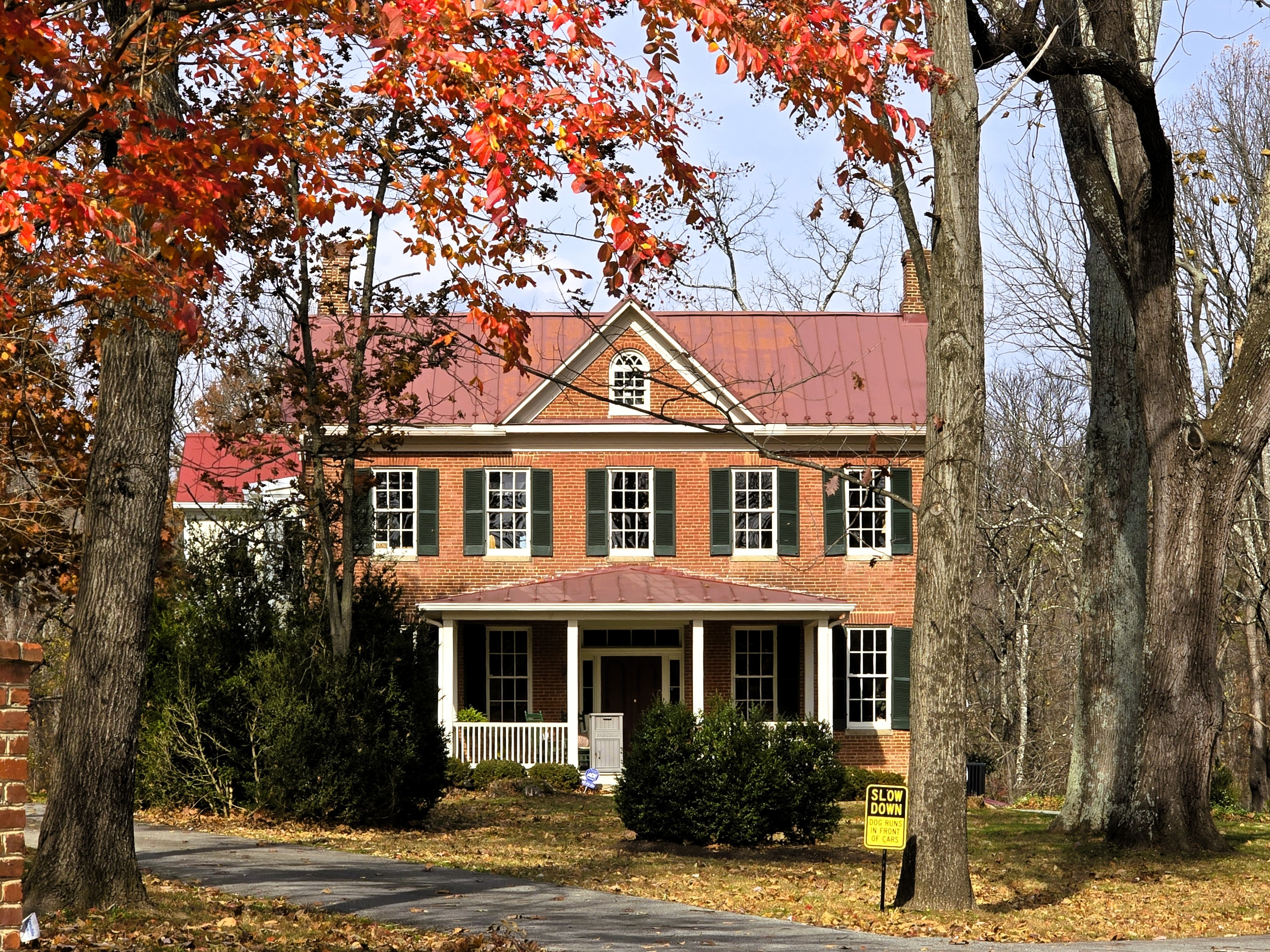
- Huntington Farms in November 2025

- Location within Maryland
- Interactive map of Huntington Farms
- 39°12′12″N 76°58′15″W
- Nearest city: Clarksville, Maryland

History
- Built: 1840s (demolished); 1870s (current)

Site notes
- Architect: John T. Hardey
- Architectural style: Romanesque Revival architecture

Huntington Farms is a historic home in Clarksville in Howard County, Maryland, United States.

Huntington Farms is a two-story L-shaped brick house built in the 1840s by John T. Hardey. Hardey's brother Dr. William H. Hardey, built Montrose next door in 1844. The house was built during the antebellum slavery period in the Howard District of Anne Arundel County, which later became Howard County. John's daughter married Tom Clarke and the couple remained on the property. They had a son, Alan Clarke, who bred and trained "some of Maryland's finest race horses".

Around 1875 or earlier, the house was destroyed in a fire. A new house was built in the Romanesque Revival architecture style that was becoming popular at the time. The house is representative of how this style was applied to farm houses. There were also a number of old barns on the property.

The property contains remnants of a brick kiln that was used by slaves to fire bricks for the original house and other buildings. There is a graveyard behind the house were both family and slaves are buried. The graveyard containing Nicholas Hardy, buried in 1850, is now located between two pipe-stem driveways in the subdivision.

The surrounding farmland was reduced from 185 acres to 13 acres by 1977 or earlier. It was subdivided again for residential development leaving only 3.085 acres around the original house.

== See also ==
- List of Howard County properties in the Maryland Historical Trust
- Montrose (Clarksville, Maryland)
