= Elmonte =

Historic house in Maryland, United States

- U.S. National Register of Historic Places
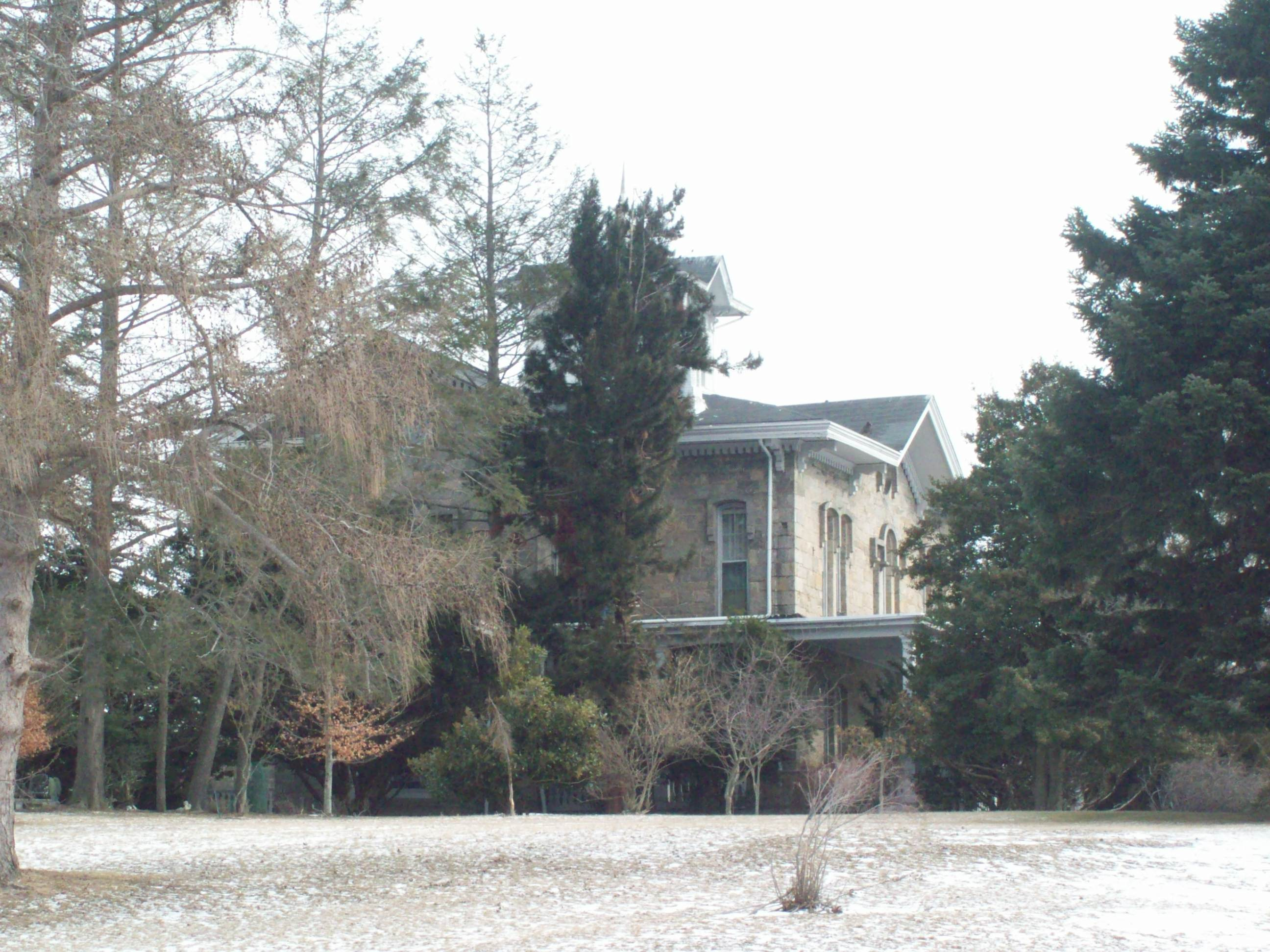
- Elmonte, January 2011

- Location within Maryland Location within the United States
- Location: 9095 Furrow Avenue, Ellicott City, Maryland
- Coordinates: 39°18′28″N 76°49′25″W
- Area: 2.8 acres (1.1 ha)
- Built: 1858
- Architect: Starkweather, Nathan Gibson
- Architectural style: Italian Villa
- NRHP reference No.: 78001468
- Added to NRHP: August 25, 1978

Elmonte, also known as Twilford, is a historic home located at Ellicott City, Howard County, Maryland, United States. It is a 2 1/2-story country house, built of random ashlar granite in the Italian villa style, and is thought to have been completed in 1858. To the rear of the mansion is a stuccoed carriage house with a two-car garage. East of the house is a large wooden barn with a slate roof and a log smokehouse. The home was built by a member of the Dorsey family, who also built nearby Dorsey Hall.

Elmonte was listed on the National Register of Historic Places in 1978.

== See also ==
- List of Howard County properties in the Maryland Historical Trust
