= Linwood Center =

House in Maryland, US

Linwood
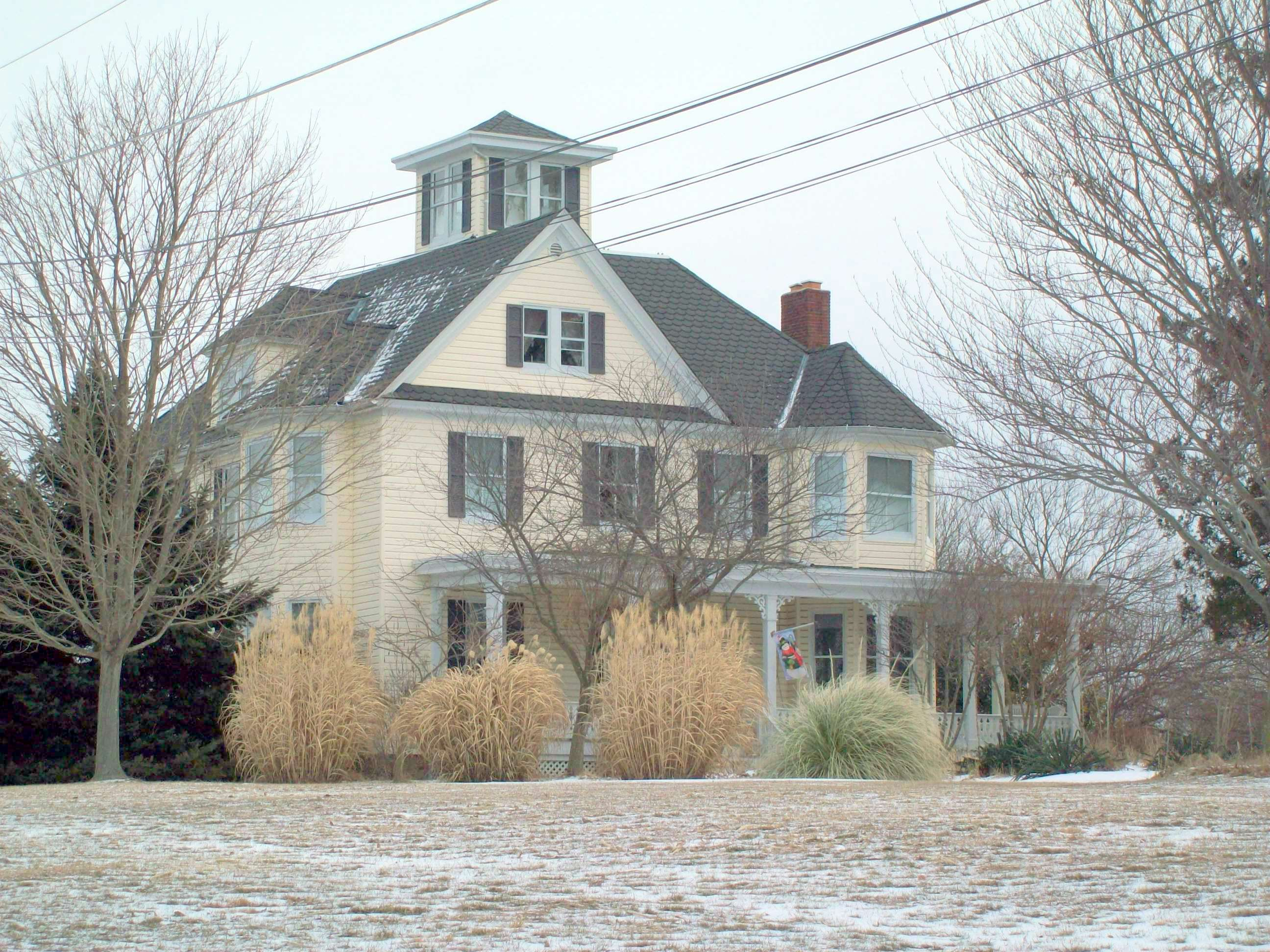
- Linwood Manor in 2011

- Location within Maryland
- Interactive map of Linwood
- 39°16′37″N 76°48′05″W
- Location: 3421 Martha Bush Drive Ellicott City, Maryland

History
- Built: 1840

Site notes
- Area: 3 acres (1.2 ha)
- Governing body: Private

Linwood is a historic home located at Ellicott City, Howard County, Maryland, United States. The seventeen room brick house was built by slave labor in the early 1800s. Portions of the farm were subdivided into several 3-5 acre lots in the late 1800s, with strict setbacks and provisions to maintain the neighborhood, including banning stores and outbuildings. Keeping the neighborhood character protected is still an issue in present times, with development proposals in 2015.

The Linwood Center was opened in 1955 by Jeanne M. Simmons as the Linwood Center for Disturbed Children, with 14 day care students and 10 residents. Children stayed for an average of three years of treatment. In 2012 the center built a $6.5 million expansion to increase autism services to 70 children. The Howard County School System reduced its autism expenses by outsourcing to Linwood with the expansion, contributing $925,000 to complete the project.

== See also ==
- List of Howard County properties in the Maryland Historical Trust
