= Dorseyville, Maryland =

Unincorporated community in Maryland, United States

- Unincorporated community
- Location within Maryland
- Coordinates: 39°15′40″N 77°02′13″W
- Country: United States of America
- State: Maryland
- County: Howard
- Time zone: UTC-5 (Eastern (EST))
  - Summer (DST): UTC-4 (EDT)

Dorseyville is an unincorporated community in Howard County, Maryland, United States. It is considered part of the modern Glenwood area. The village was situated along a fork in the rolling road that would service Annapolis or Tridelphia, Maryland. A stone dam, named Dorsey's Mill Dam, was situated on the Cattail Creek here before being washed out.

== See also ==
- Glenwood, Howard County, Maryland
- Roxbury Mill
