= Old National Pike =

U.S. Route 40

Location
- Country: United States

Highway system
- United States Numbered Highway System; List; Special; Divided

Old National Pike or Old National Road, and sometimes Old Cumberland Road, Old Route 40, Old U.S. 40 are terms both colloquially and officially applied to bypassed parts of the United States' first federally funded highway (1811), the National Pike—which are essentially the parts of U.S. Route 40 (1920s) west of Baltimore and east of Missouri. Terms such as the 'Old National Pike' and 'Old National Road' are similar terms frequently built into the local business structure as official addresses, in advertising and generally refer to older roadway parts (passing through congested business or residential neighborhoods) which have been replaced by newer, more convenient highways or in most cases modern multi-lane super-highways.

As the first National Highway, with the first ever congressional funding for a U.S. road, the highway grew with the nation. When the Interstate Highway system was funded, and sometimes locally as some cities, counties or states improved their own local highway networks, stretches of road containing a lot of turns, frequent stops (traffic signals), and-or narrow hard to widen ways and roadbeds, stretches of local roads became bypassed and locally named "Old National Pike". This is a partial list of those ambiguous names about the United States:

Eight stretches of older highways, Special routes of U.S. Route 40, have been granted federal support to maintain and sign by-passed roads as named variant of nearby wider U.S. 40 routes; the route markers carry not only U.S. 40 designations, but auxiliary signs such as: "Alternate", "Business", "Truck", "Scenic", etc. Some of these varieties of 'Old National Pike' are linked below.

== List and descriptions of roads denoted Old National Pike ==
- (Hagerstown–Frederick, Maryland): Hagerstown to Frederick, Maryland
- Old National Pike (Brownsville, Pennsylvania) (Official namings), alternate colloquially, Old U.S. Route 40 —Extends from the Market Street elevated bridge, down the lower town main street to the jct. of High Street, turning across the Old National Pike Bridge, to the left turn up the hill past Denbo Heights several miles to Malden where it rejoins the four-lane highway.
