= Duvall's Range =

- Location within Maryland
- 39°15′49.8″N 77°02′31.8″W
- Nearest city: Glenwood, Maryland

History
- Built: 1695

Duvall's Range or the Steven Boone Dorsey House, is a historic home located in Glenwood in Howard County, Maryland, United States,

Duvall's Range is a 708-acre land grant surveyed in 1672 sold by Mareen Duvall's brother John Duvall to John Dorsey in 1695. John Dorsey's son Steven Boone Dorsey Jr. constructed the log structures on the slave plantation property. In 1792, portions of Duvall's Range and Vanity Mount were transferred from Philemon Dorsey to Dr. Charles Alexander Warfield.

The stucco-covered stone plantation house built around 1795 is two stories tall and three bays wide which is built around a log house and smoke house built in 1695.

By the 1970s, the property had been subdivided down to an 81-acre parcel and is currently a 72.8-acre agricultural zoned parcel.

== See also ==
- List of Howard County properties in the Maryland Historical Trust
