= Montpelier Mansion (Fulton, Maryland) =

Former house in Howard County, Maryland, U.S.

Montpelier
- Location within Maryland Location within the United States
- 39°9′50″N 76°53′31″W
- Nearest city: Fulton, Maryland

History
- Built: 1740

Site notes
- Architectural style: Georgian

Montpelier Mansion, sometimes referred to as "Montpelier I", was a house in western Laurel, Maryland, now more closely associated with Fulton, Maryland within Howard County, Maryland, United States. The Georgian style building was built circa 1740 and demolished following a 1994 historic survey with addendum and photos dating as late as August 1995.

== History ==
In 1711, Henry Ridgely III (1690–1749) patented the 307 acres of land in the Howard district of Anne Arundel County called Broken Land, and in 1719 patented Ridgely's Great Park with his brother in law Thomas Worthington. The Montpelier house was constructed by Colonel Henry Ridgely IV (born 1728) and his wife Ann Dorsey (1730–1767) circa 1770. His daughter Ann Ridgely married Major Thomas Snowden, building a manor house in Laurel also named Montpelier. Prior to building the house, Ridgely IV raised volunteers in 1752 to fight in the French and Indian War. From 1760 to 1779, Ridgely served as justice to Anne Arundel County.

Montpelier was a two-and-a-half-story Georgian style building with a central hall. The brick building rested on a stone foundation with stucco facing, later covered by layers of shingles and siding. A large wooden barn and silo were onsite with the property. The property was later owned by Herbert Wessel.

The property was purchased by Hopkins Road Limited Partnership. In 1994, a historic survey was undertaken declaring there was not enough integrity of the site to be historic. Howard County Department of Planning and Zoning rezoned the historic property to PEC (Planned Employment Center). Montpelier was completely demolished to build the MP5 commercial office building adjoining the Johns Hopkins Applied Physics Lab research park. Maple Lawn Developer Jeffery Greenburg did not preserve the historic building or 12-acre site like Laurel's Montpelier. In May 1996 the building was burned, then torn down. A lone indication of the historic site's existence is the road to the facility named Montpelier Road.

Montpelier was one of many historical buildings in the region with valuable real estate that was lost to fire, including Troy Hill (1990), Avondale Mill (1991), St. Mary's College (1997), Ammendale Normal Institute (1998), Phelps Log Cabin – moved from North Laurel to Elkridge (2001), and Henryton State Hospital (2007, 2011).

== See also ==
- List of Howard County properties in the Maryland Historical Trust
- Montpelier Mansion (Laurel, Maryland)
- Applied Physics Laboratory
