= Woodlawn (Ellicott City, Maryland) =

- Location within Maryland
- 39°16′17″N 76°48′0″W
- Location: Ellicott City, Maryland

History
- Built: 1850
- Demolished: 1995

Site notes
- Area: Ellicott city

Woodlawn or Papillon was a manor home in Ellicott City, Howard County, Maryland in the United States.

Woodlawn was built by Thomas Beale Dorsey. The estate featured two entrances to avoid a toll on the old Frederick turnpike and a carriage house outbuilding. Between the 1880s and 1890s, it was the home of the Rodgers family (of Rodgers Avenue). Walter K. Plum of the American Oil Company named the estate Woodlawn Manor, the same name as an estate several miles westward. In 1947 the estate was the home of Dorsey Williams and Frances Lurman in 1947. In 1953 Dr. Allen Jones owned the property, followed by Keith Garret in 1970. In 1976 the owner attempted to convert the property to a motel. The estate was converted to a country inn. The property was owned in the 1970s by Investor's Developers inc, who subdivided the estate to 26 acres and converted the manor to the Pauvre Papillon restaurant serving French cuisine.

Following the Ellicott City fire of 11 November 1984, the owner of the Chez Fernand Restaurant attempted to relocate to Papillon. The asking price at the time was $3 Million dollars, and the owner chose to move to Baltimore instead. The estate was razed for a development of 112 townhouses in 1995 by Security Development Corporation, a company founded by family members of former county Commissioner Norman E. Moxley, and Robert Moxley chief land purchaser for the Rouse Company project of Columbia. The Howard County Department of Planning and Zoning approved the permits but claimed not to be aware that the site was historic. Vice president Steve Breeden told the press that nobody would want to live in the historic mansion, especially after recent fire damage. Woodlawn was one of many historical buildings in the region with valuable real estate that was developed after a fire set to the structure, including Troy Hill (1990), Avondale Mill (1991), St. Mary's College (1997), Ammendale Normal Institute (1998), Phelps Log Cabin - Moved from North Laurel to Elkridge (2001). Henryton State Hospital (2007), (2011)

== See also ==
- List of Howard County properties in the Maryland Historical Trust
- Woodlawn (Columbia, Maryland)
