= Thistle Manufacturing Company =

Historic factory located along the Patapsco River in Maryland, US

Simkins Industries Factory
- Interactive map of the Simkins Industries Factory area
- Former names: Thistle Manufacturing Company Factory, Ilchester Mills, Thistle Cotton Mill

General information
- Type: Factory
- Location: Catonsville, Maryland, near Ilchester, Maryland 39°15'07.8"N 76°45'55.4"W
- Coordinates: 39°15′07.8″N 76°45′55.4″W
- Completed: 1837
- Demolished: 2013

Technical details
- Floor area: 87,000 sf

Thistle Manufacturing Company factory was a historic factory located along the Patapsco River, which runs through Catonsville, Maryland across from Ilchester, Maryland. The 1800s factory was in continuous operation until 2003.

== Factory History ==
The factory resided at 201 River Road in Catonsville, Maryland, on 106 acres of land in both Baltimore County and Howard County along the Patapsco River on River road. The site was known as the "Thistle Factory" or "Thistle Cotton Mill". Alexander Fridge, George and William Morris founded the Thistle Manufacturing Company in 1824 with the purchase of the property from the Ellicott brothers. The Ellicotts stipulated that the new factory as well as the Dismal Mill downstream would not operate as a competing flour mill, and in turn, the Ellicott's could not sell liquor on their land, Ellicott's Mills. In 1825 Fridge had sold his assets and the Morris brothers petitioned to build a road from the Thistle factory to the turnpike followed in 1832 with a state appropriation of $600 to build a bridge across the Patapsco at Thistle Mills. In 1837 they built a cotton mill and silk production facility on property purchased from the Ellicott brothers. The 100 employee mill building was built of locally quarried stone along with at least five stone buildings to support laborers and a general store. The company expanded production with the purchase of the Ilchester flour mill in 1882, but lost the facility in receivership in 1892. In 1895, the current owner and operator of the mill W.H. Kerr drowned when attempting to rescue his son who fell off his yacht in Annapolis. In 1919 Edward A.A. Blakeney purchased the plant for cotton duck production, and electrified operations in 1925, but shifted to tire fabric manufacturing.

In 1928 The Bartgis Brothers Company purchased the factory and refitted it through August 1929 for paper production. Bartigis was purchased by E.H. Lupton, and was sold to the New Haven Board and Carton Co. in July 1957 and later, Simkins Industries, Inc. The 250 employee factory produced recycled paper products with printing operations from 1919 to 1964. Most of 1964 operations were interrupted by a labor strike. In 1952, a dump was created on the steep slopes that was in operation until the mid-1980s. In 1971 sewer service was added, stopping direct drainage of titanium dioxide into the Patapsco River. In 1972, the factory was devastated by Hurricane Agnes and then again by a four-alarm fire just four months later, though did recover back into operations within the ruins.

The last factory configuration included the mill, powerplant, scalehouse, and a dump. A historic mill village is on the wooded site.

== Modern developments ==
In 1991, Thistle was the last remaining company town in Baltimore County, with 110 remaining workers at the Simkins Industries Inc. paper mill that processed recycled wastepaper into box board. On the site were the remains of what might have been the village's church and school, with a graveyard above the ridge, though many other buildings and the company houses for employees on Hilltop Road had been destroyed by flooding or demolished over the years. In June 2003, a four alarm fire broke out and forced the facility to close after 46 years of operation as a paper recycling plant.

In August 2003, a complaint was filed against the facility for violations in hazardous materials and solid waste dumping. The company entered a voluntary cleanup program with the Maryland Department of the Environment. It then started dismantling the historic mill town buildings and industrial tanks. The building was burned again in 2009 and December 2011. Simkins Industries announced in 2012 that it would sell the historic factory and 55 acres of property to a land developer or the State of Maryland. The complex was demolished in 2013.

The Simkins plant was one of many historical buildings in the region with valuable real estate that was lost to arson, including Troy Hill (1990), Avondale Mill (1991), St. Mary's College (directly across the river from the Thistle plant (1997), and Ammendale Normal Institute (1998), and Henryton State Hospital (2007).
