= Woodlawn (Columbia, Maryland) =

Historic house in Maryland, United States

- U.S. National Register of Historic Places
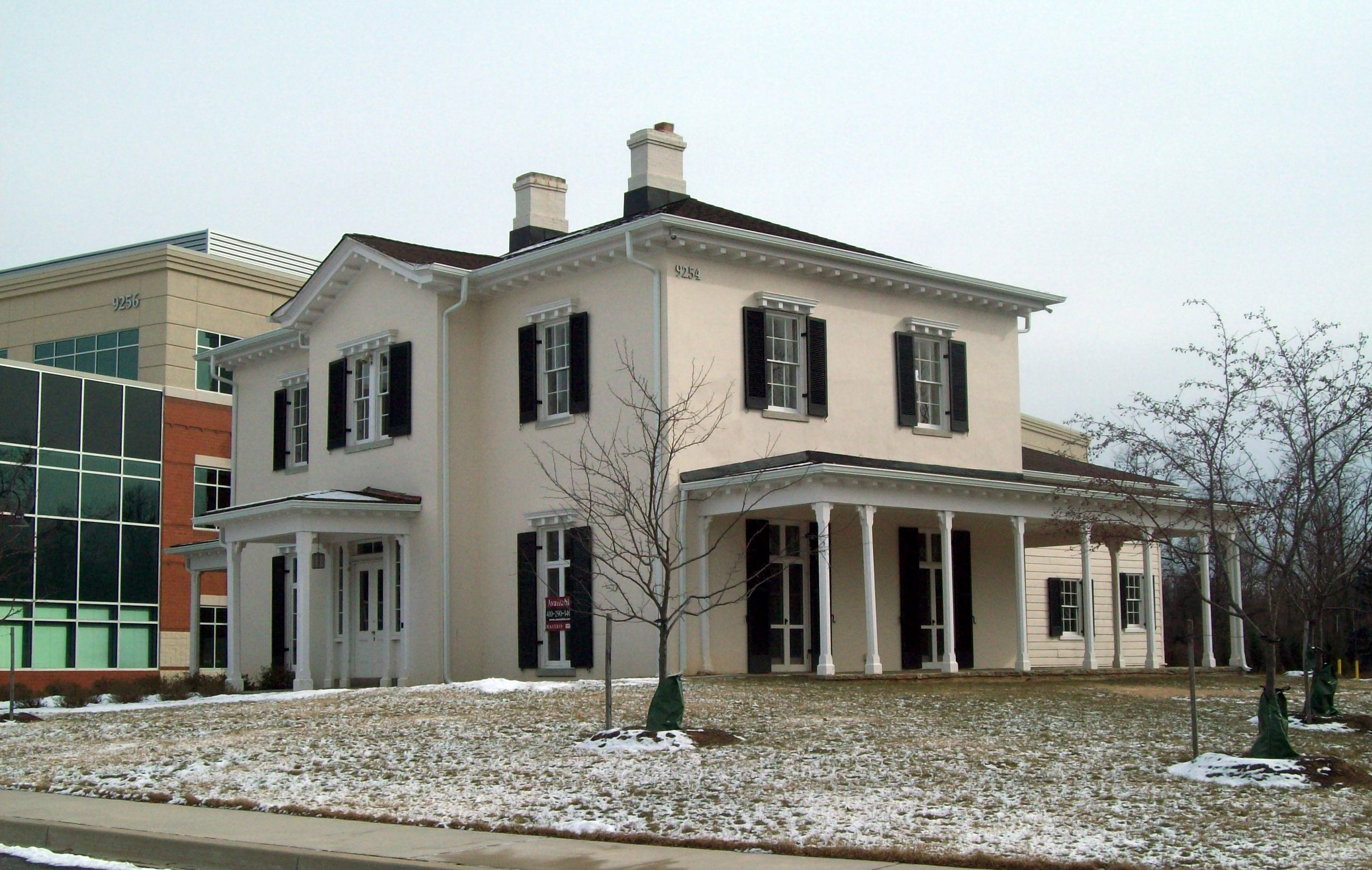
- Woodlawn, January 2011

- Location within Maryland Location within the United States
- Location: 9254 Bendix Rd., Columbia, Maryland
- Coordinates: 39°14′5″N 76°49′33″W
- Area: 5 acres (2.0 ha)
- Architectural style: Greek Revival, Italianate
- NRHP reference No.: 83002953
- Added to NRHP: February 3, 1983

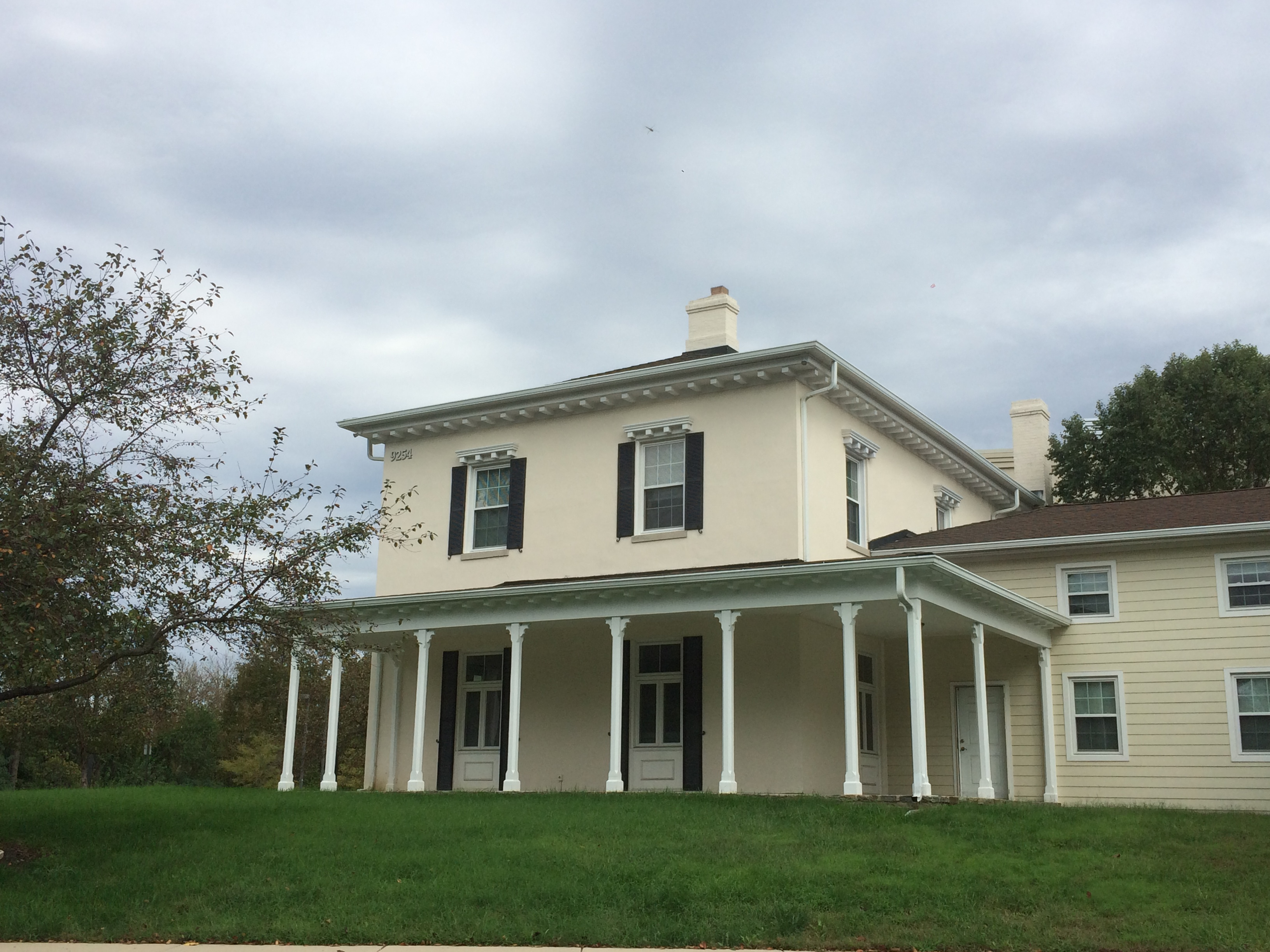
Woodlawn (side) in September 2018

Woodlawn, is a historic slave plantation located at Columbia, Howard County, Maryland. It is a two-story, stuccoed stone house built in 1840 with wood frame portions constructed about 1785. It was part of a 200-acre farm divided from larger parcels patented by the Dorsey family. The design reflects the transition between the Greek Revival and Italianate architecture styles. The home is associated with Henry Howard Owings, a prominent Howard County landowner and farmer, who also served as a judge of the Orphan's Court for Howard County. Owings purchased the property in 1858 and died at Woodlawn in 1869. The former tobacco farm produced corn, oats, hay, and pork. The majority of the property surrounding Woodland and its slave quarters were subdivided by 1966 and purchased by Howard Research and Development for the planned community development Columbia, Maryland, leaving only 5 acres surrounded by multiple lots intended for development of an Oakland Ridge industrial center and equestrian center. The summer kitchen, smokehouse, corn crib and stable built about 1830 have been replaced by a parking lot.

In 2003, Preservation Howard County appealed to the Columbia Association to restore the adjacent stone slave quarters building predating the 1789 Woodlawn house. In 2004 the property surrounding the Woodlawn manor was rezoned from residential to dense office use. All of the 200-year-old trees surrounding the property were declared diseased by the developer-owner and cut down. In June 2006, Developer Ron Brasher submitted plans to build a 71,705sf office building adjacent to Woodlawn with a parking lot surrounding the building on all sides. The project was temporarily delayed due to lack of road access and requests for reduced setbacks. The planning and zoning director cited the developer's efforts to restore and lease the 5000sf mansion for office space or a "condo opportunity" as a way to preserve the manor recently rezoned by the department. In August 2007, the Columbia Association purchased the slave quarters property and approved another $125,000 (~$181,644 in 2024) for restoration with the construction of the office project pending.

It was listed on the National Register of Historic Places in 1983.

== See also ==
- List of Howard County properties in the Maryland Historical Trust
- Dorsey Hall an 1832 house built on an adjacent farm.
- Woodlawn (Papillon), Ellicott City Maryland. - 1850 Thomas Beale Dorsey Home.
- Woodlawn Plantation in Fairfax, Virginia (originally part of Mount Vernon)
