= Laurel Mill =

Former mill in Laurel, Maryland, United States

- Current status: Demolished; part of a dam bulwark remains
- Location: Laurel, Maryland, U.S.
- Serving canal: Patuxent River
- Serving railway: Baltimore and Ohio Railroad
- Owner: Nicholas Snowden family
- Further ownership: Tiffany family of Baltimore (1850s–1860s); Others (1860s–1920s)
- Coordinates: 39.11°N 76.8577°W

Construction
- Built: 1811
- Demolished: 1940s, after 1929 closure

The Laurel Mill was a multi-use mill located along the Patuxent River in Laurel, Maryland. Built by Nicholas Snowden on the site of an earlier grist mill, Laurel Mill operated intermittently between 1811 and 1929, manufacturing flour, cloth, cotton duck and other cotton products, and window shades. Between 1835 and 1851 the mill was operated by Horace Capron, who had married into the Snowden family, and the Patuxent Manufacturing Company, who also established the town of Laurel Factory, which was incorporated as Laurel in 1870.

Laurel Mill closed by 1929 and was razed in the 1940s, and the grounds of the mill now include the City of Laurel Municipal Pool. The Laurel Museum currently sits opposite the Laurel Mill site, in a home constructed by the mill company.

== Snowden family ==
The first building on the site of the Laurel Mill was a stone grist mill constructed in 1811 by Nicholas Snowden, a member of a prominent Maryland family. Snowden's parents "Major" Thomas Snowden and Ann Ridgely constructed a five-part, Georgian-style home, Montpelier Mansion, near the Patuxent River between 1781 and 1785. Nicholas Snowden was born at Montpelier Mansion in 1786, and owned the mansion from 1803 until his death in 1831. In addition to operating his family's 9,000 acre plantation and the Patuxent Ironworks, Snowden opened the grist mill in 1811; by 1820 the mill employed two workers and produced 10–15,000 bushels of flour.

== Horace Capron and the growth of Laurel Factory ==
In 1834 Horace Capron, a businessman who had operated several mills, including Savage Mill in Savage, Maryland, married Nicholas Snowden's daughter Louisa Snowden. A year later, in 1835, he formed the Patuxent Manufacturing Company and expanded on the Laurel Mill building. Aided by the recent construction of the B&O Railroad, manufacturing boomed at Laurel Mill in the 1840s. By 1845 Capron operated both the Laurel Mill, then called Laurel Factory, and newly built Avondale Mill, employing between 700 and 800 women and men between the two buildings.

Business slowed soon after, and according to the 1850 census Patuxent Manufacturing Company only had 500 employees. That same year the company built a larger dam on the Patuxent River to allow it to shift from water wheel to water turbine power, and also added small steam engines.

In 1851 Horace Capron declared bankruptcy and soon after moved to Texas. Ownership of the mill was taken over by the Tiffany family of Baltimore, one of Capron's business partners. The mill went under the management of Robert Pilson, who operated the facility under a reduced 11-hour workload producing 4-4 Brown muslin "Laurel-D". A fire destroyed the mill in 1855, the same year mill workers went on strike for shorter hours. Already facing multiple business difficulties, the mill shut down operations during the Civil War.

During Capron's time in Laurel, the Patuxent Manufacturing Company oversaw the construction of fifty two-story stone and brick tenement style houses to rent to mill employees. Several of these buildings still stand on Main Street, including the building that now houses the Laurel Museum. As the number of men and women employed at the mill increased, the community in the surrounding environs grew into a company town, then known as of Laurel Factory.

== Post–Civil War and George Nye ==
The company town of Laurel Factory was incorporated in 1870 as the city of Laurel, and the mill continued to be the primary employer in the city. George Nye, a Civil War veteran, served as superintendent of Laurel Mill from 1877 to 1885, during which the mill frequently was closed due to renovations or shortages of manufacturing material.

Ownership of the mill passed hands frequently in the last quarter of the nineteenth century, and after Nye's departure the building was auctioned off, and later operated under the name The Laurel Company.

== 20th century ==
Operations at the Laurel Mill in the early twentieth century focused solely on cotton duck. In 1901, the Laurel Mills company was consolidated into the Cotton Duck Company (of the Mount Vernon-Woodberry Cotton Duck Company). In 1911 the Consolidated Cotton Duck Company was leased by the Ramie Company of New England. During World War I, much like during the Civil War, mill operations shut down, and the building housed soldiers from Camp Meade, which later became Fort George G. Meade. Between 1922 and 1929 the mill built window shades for the Lapsley Interstate Shade Cloth Company, and shut down in 1929. The building and mill race stood until the 1940s, when it was destroyed. The abandoned dam remained across the Patuxent River until the 1960s, and a portion of the bulwark on the Prince George's County side of the river remains standing.

== See also ==
- Avondale Mill
