= Griggs House =

House in Granite, Maryland

- Interactive map of the Griggs House area

General information
- Type: Federal Style
- Location: Hernwood Road Granite, Maryland
- Coordinates: 39.345491°N 76.858562°W
- Completed: Around 1850

The Griggs House was a historic home located in Granite, Maryland. It was a two-story house constructed in the mid-19th century. The home is associated with the film, The Blair Witch Project.

The house was a built in the style of Federal architecture, as a two-story stucco faced post and beam wood construction house on a stone foundation. It was two bays by three bays wide, and situated near the Smith/Sumwalt house and the Granite quarry which the town was renamed for. The house was visible on the 1877 Baltimore County Atlas.

In 1984, the Department of Natural Resources conducted a historical survey of the Griggs property that resided on parkland of Patapsco Valley State Park. The property was not in use by this time and had interior details removed by vandals.

In 1999, the house was used for the climactic ending of The Blair Witch Project. After filming, the State of Maryland announced it would demolish the historic home. As fans were visiting the abandoned house, its condition deteriorated. Funds were raised to save the building based on the success of the movie, and the State released press announcements that the property would be spared. However, the house was demolished soon afterwards without an announcement.

== See also ==
- Henryton State Hospital
