= St. Mary's College (Ilchester) =

1868–1972 school in Maryland, US

- Other names: Mount St. Clemons College
- Type: Seminary
- Active: 1868–1972
- Religious affiliation: Congregation of the Most Holy Redeemer (Catholic Church)
- Location: Ilchester, Maryland, United States; 39°15′03″N 76°45′57″W

St. Marys College was a Roman Catholic school in Ilchester, Maryland (Illchester Mills) near modern Ellicott City, Maryland in Howard County. The ruins are near Ilchester and Bonnie Branch roads. The upper college building was built in 1868 consisting of a cupola-topped eighteen-bay-by-five-bay building with a five-bay-by-five-bay projection. A three-bay-by-three-bay, five-story L-shaped addition is included, with all of the structure on a stone foundation. A three-story chapel was attached to the building in 1882. In 1934 a fifth floor was added throughout. A statue of Madonna with Child was situated in a niche.

== History ==
The college was situated on the land of the former Ellicott brothers hotel and a tavern, adjacent to a Baltimore and Ohio Railroad station along the Patapsco River. The site was anchored by a twin of the Savage, Maryland Bollman Truss Iron Railroad Bridge built in 1869; the bridge was replaced in 1900. In 1866, after years of neglect, the buildings and 110 acres (0.45 km^{2}) site were sold by George Ellicott to the Congregation of the Most Holy Redeemer (Redemptorists) for $15,000.

Mount St. Clemons College was built in 1868 and the studentate moved from Annapolis. In 1872 the juventate settled into the expanded lower house (the former Ellicott Tavern); however, it relocated to Pennsylvania in 1881. The name was changed to St. Mary's College in 1882. A student would spend six years at the college before ordination as a priest. In 1893 a congregation named Our Lady of Perpetual Help was formed to assist poor in the area, and it still exists. The novitiate moved from Annapolis, to be situated at the Ilchester site from 1907 to 1972. In 1907 the studentate moved from Ilchester to New York. The Ellicott hotel became the lower house of the college; it was destroyed by fire on 14 June 1968. In 1972 the Redemptorists shut down the college, with only 10 students in its graduating class. The Novitate was moved to Oconomowoc, Wisconsin, where it was combined with another Novitiate.

In 1982 Micheal Nibali, a developer, purchased a 33 acres (0.13 km^{2}) portion of the site for $250,000 including the college building, with the intent of converting the building into 96 apartments. Nibali had won a controversial bid from executive J. Hugh Nichols to convert the recently burned Ellicott City Elementary school to apartments. After approval failed, the building was abandoned and allowed to be vandalized. During this time, residents and media gave the college building the moniker, "Hell House". In 1987 the Maryland Department of Natural Resources acquired a 77 acres (0.31 km^{2}) portion of the site and annexed the land to Patapsco Valley State Park.

The Kamakoti & Tirupati Foundation had previously leased the site launched an effort to purchase it. However, in 1988 the site was purchased by Sateesh Kumar Singh of BCS Limited Partnership for $375,000. A caretaker, Alan Rufus Hudson defended the property from vandals with repeated arrests for assault. On Halloween night, 1997, the building was burned by arsonists. The caretaker's building was condemned shortly afterward. The building was completely demolished in 2006.

The college was one of many historical buildings in the region with valuable real estate that was lost to arson, including The Volkmann Manor (1965), Troy Hill (1990), Avondale Mill (1991), Ammendale Normal Institute (1998), Phelps Log Cabin - Moved from North Laurel to Elkridge (2001), Thistle Manufacturing Company, located directly across the river from St. Mary's (2003), and Henryton State Hospital (2007 and 2011)
