= Granite Historic District =

Historic district in Maryland, United States

- U.S. National Register of Historic Places
- U.S. Historic district
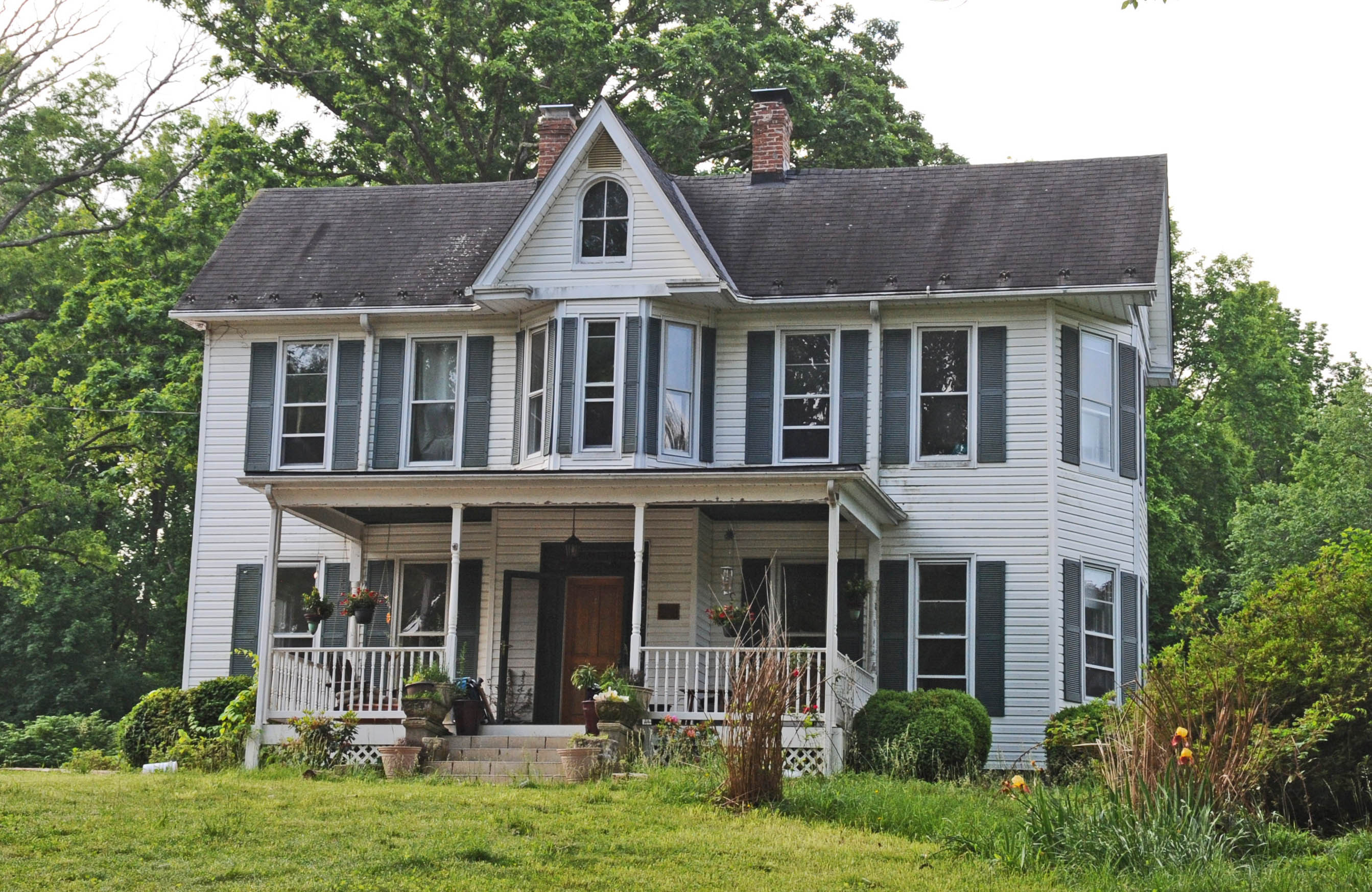
- "Woodside" (c. 1886) house built by Atwood Blunt, Jr, one of the Granite quarry owners
- Interactive map of Granite Historic District
- Location: Roughly, area surrounding Old Court Rd. and St. Paul Ave., Granite, Maryland
- Coordinates: 39°20′36″N 76°50′51″W
- Area: 190 acres (77 ha)
- Built: 1750
- Architect: Kennedy, Thomas C.
- Architectural style: Late Victorian
- NRHP reference No.: 94001091
- Added to NRHP: September 22, 1994

Granite Historic District is a national historic district in Granite, Baltimore County, Maryland, United States. It comprises the focus of a rural quarrying community located in the Patapsco Valley of western Baltimore County, Maryland. It includes two churches, a school, a social hall, former commercial buildings, and houses and outbuildings, representing the period from the initial settlement of the area about 1750 through the early 20th century, when the village achieved its present form. The district also includes the former Waltersville quarry, one of two major granite operations in the region during the period. Granite from the Waltersville and Fox Rock quarries was utilized in construction of the Baltimore & Ohio Railroad in the 1830s, and later in such projects as the Library of Congress, old Treasury Building, and parts of the inner walls of the Washington Monument in Washington, D.C., and numerous other projects in Baltimore city and county.

It was added to the National Register of Historic Places in 1994.

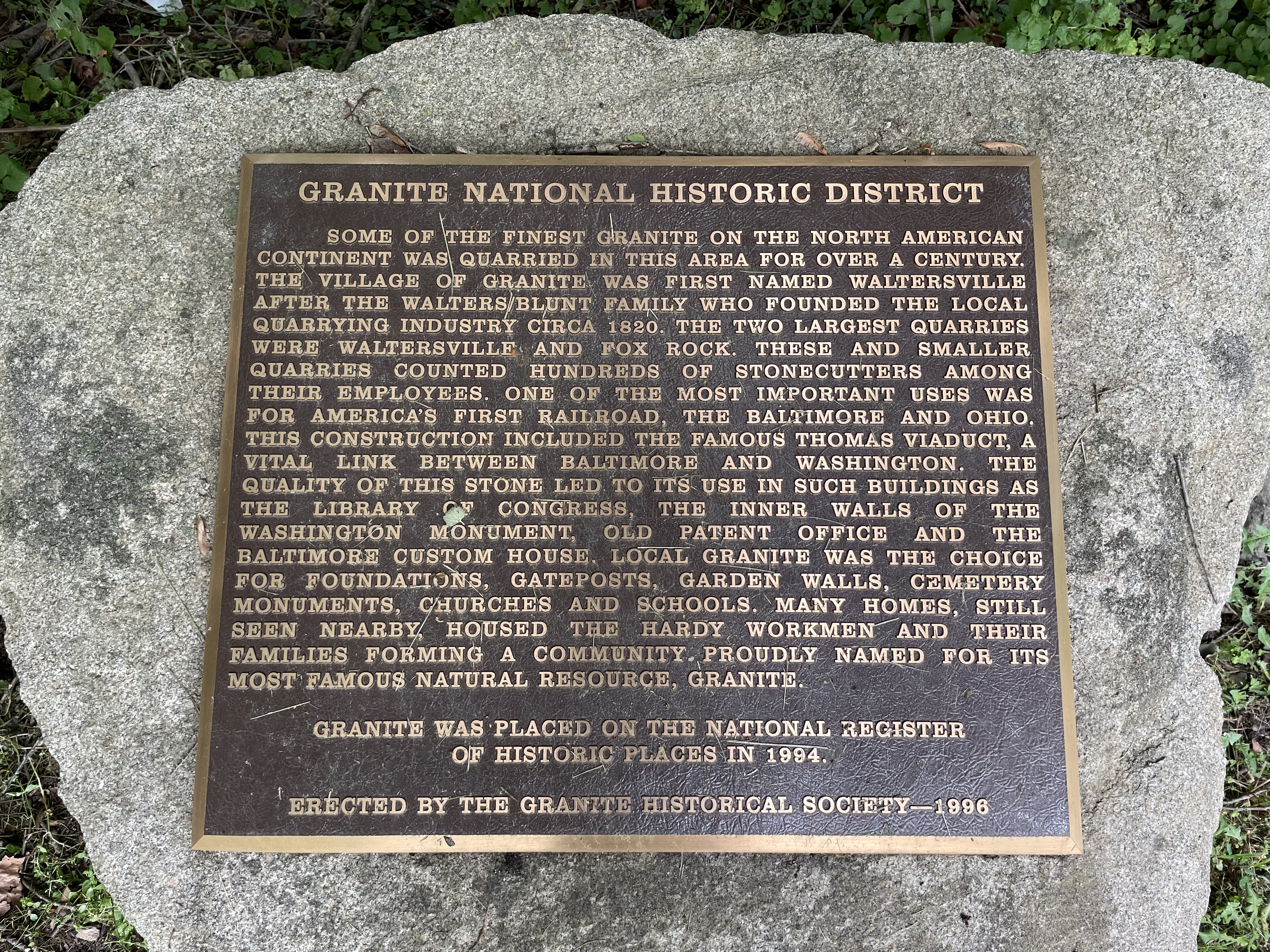
Historic District designation plaque

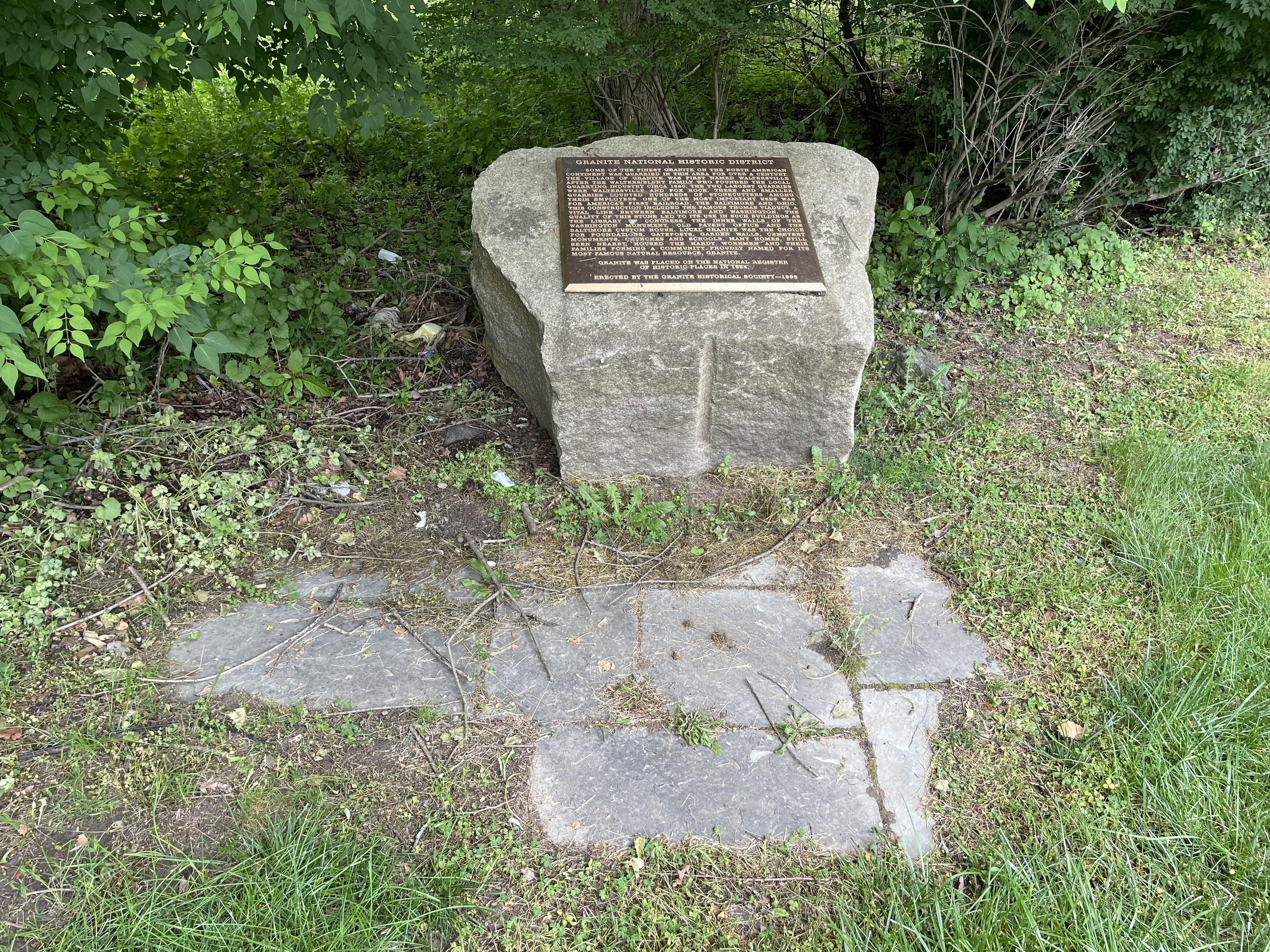
Historic District designation plaque on a piece of granite

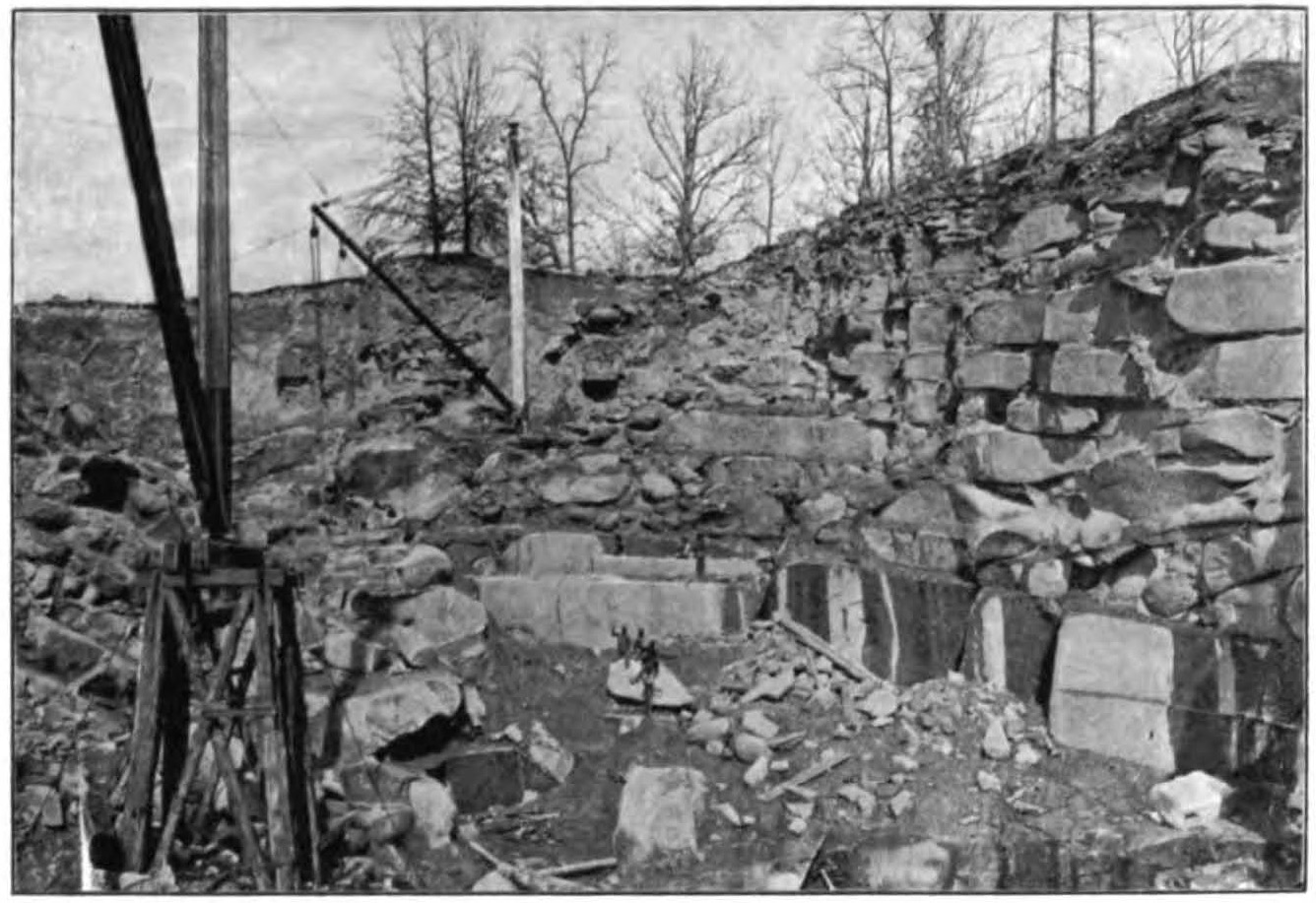
Weller's Quarry
