= Ilchester, Maryland =

- Census-designated place
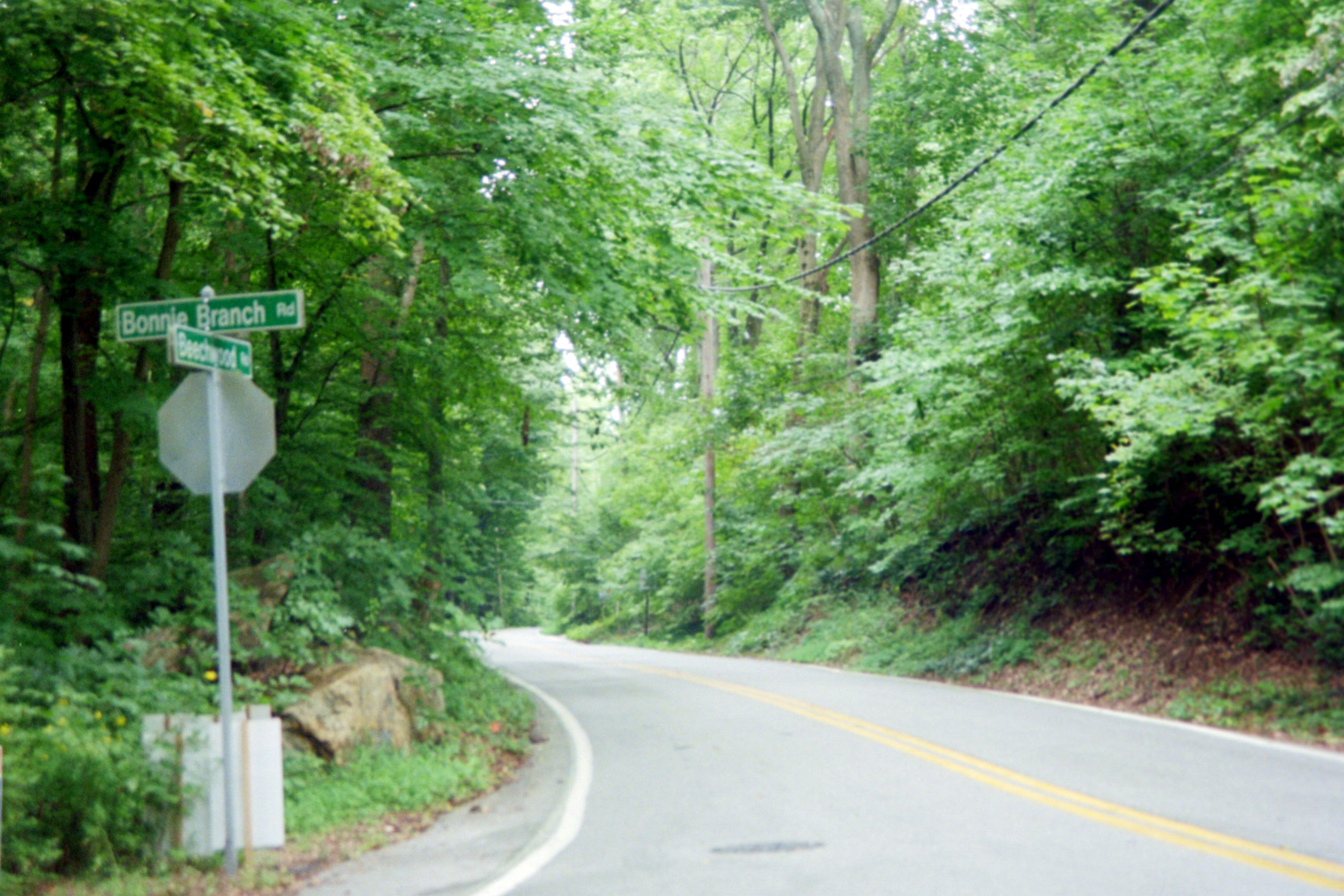
- Beechwood Road and Bonnie Branch Road in Ilchester

- Location within Maryland Location within the United States
- Coordinates: 39°15′03″N 76°45′53″W
- Country: United States
- State: Maryland
- County: Howard
- Settled: 1761
- Named for: Ilchester

Area
  - Total: 10.82 sq mi (28.02 km^{2})
  - Land: 10.76 sq mi (27.86 km^{2})
  - Water: 0.062 sq mi (0.16 km^{2})
- Elevation: 100 ft (30 m)

Population (2020)
  - Total: 26,824
  - Density: 2,494.1/sq mi (962.96/km^{2})
- Time zone: UTC−5 (Eastern (EST))
  - Summer (DST): UTC−4 (EDT)
- Postal codes: 21043, 21075
- FIPS code: 24-41475
- GNIS feature ID: 588678

Ilchester is an unincorporated community and census-designated place in Howard County, Maryland, United States. The population was 23,476 at the 2010 census. It was named after the village of Ilchester in the English county of Somerset.

== History ==
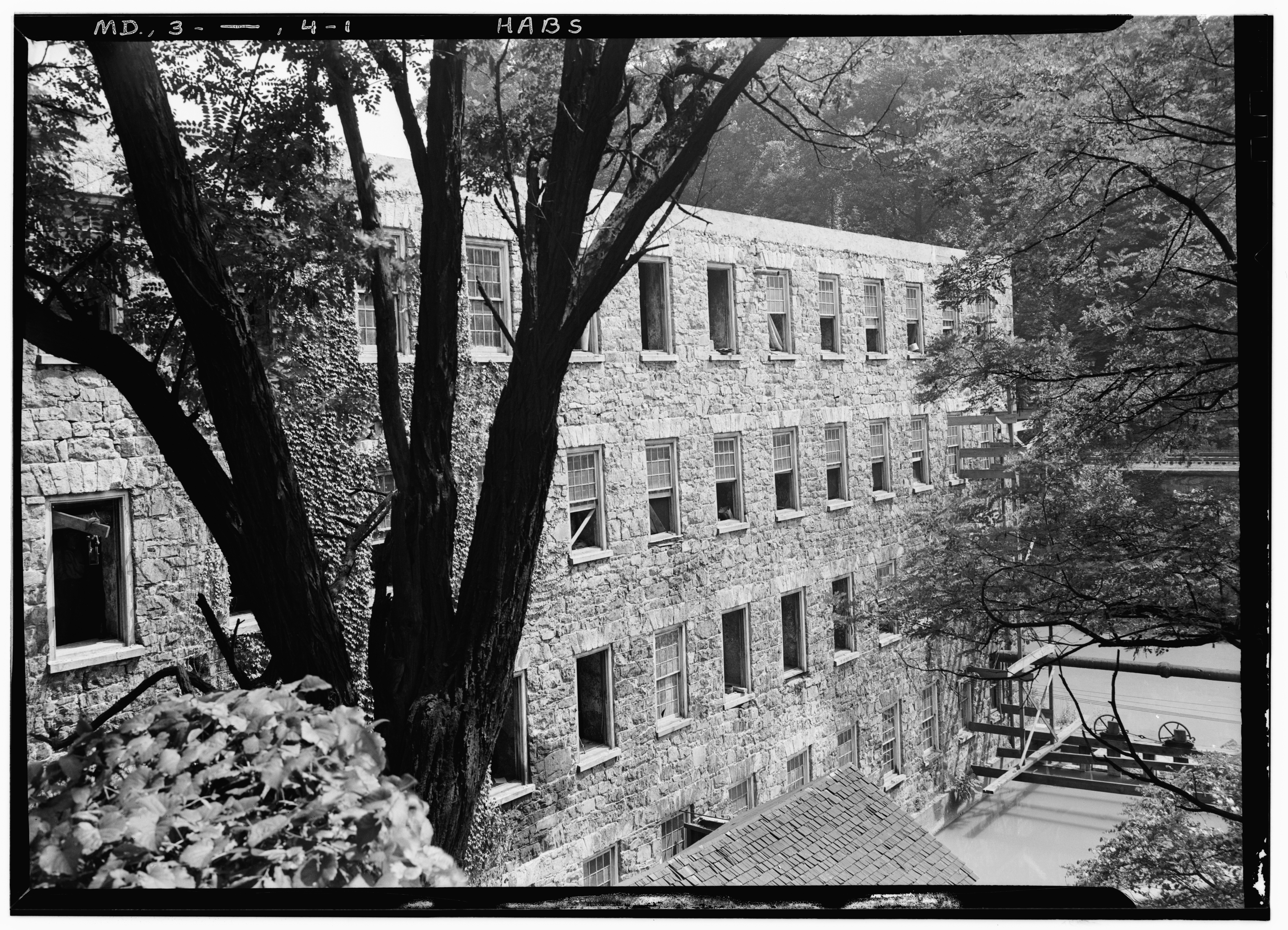
Mill at Old River Road (1936)

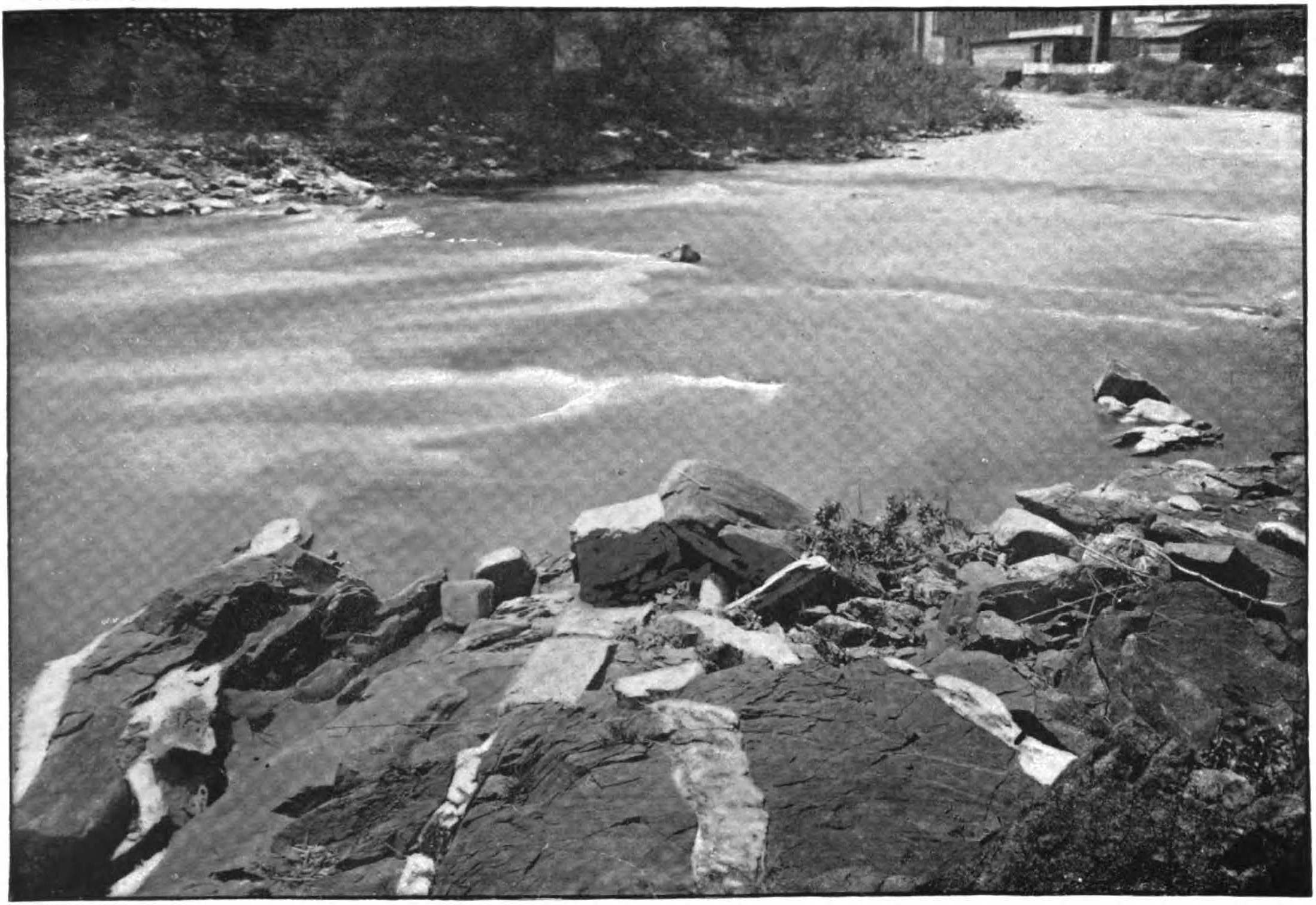
Pegmatite dikes along the river at Ilchester (c. 1895)

In 1761, John Cornthwaite founded a wood grist mill called the Dismal Mill, located approximately 2 miles (3 km) southeast of Ellicott City on the western shore of the Patapsco River. The Ellicott family (John, Andrew, and Joseph Ellicott) settled in the area in the late 18th century, buying a two-mile section of the Patapsco in 1772 that included Ilchester and Ellicott Mills. The Baltimore and Ohio Railroad (B&O) was built up the Patapsco River valley through Ilchester in 1830 (see Old Main Line Subdivision), and George Ellicott Jr. (grandson of Andrew) built a tavern and cooper shop along the railroad. The Thistle Manufacturing Company built a factory in 1837. Ilchester did not become a major stop for the B&O due to its steep grades, and the tavern was unsuccessful. In 1842, mail service was started with the station name "Illchester Mills".

Ellicott sold his tavern and 110 acres of land to a Redemptorist church order in 1866. The church used the Ellicott estate to start a college, initially called Mount Saint Clemens when it opened in 1868. Several additions to the original building were made, and a chapel was constructed. In 1882 it was renamed Saint Mary's College. In 1893 the chapel was established as a parish church dedicated to "Our Lady of Perpetual Help". The parish moved the church to a new facility in 1958. Enrollment at the college declined, and the college was closed in 1972. The State of Maryland purchased a portion of the campus in 1987 and added the land to adjacent Patapsco Valley State Park.

In 1949, the Baltimore Council of the Girl Scouts purchased "Camp Ilchester", which has remained in operation to date as a Girl Scout camp.

== Geography ==
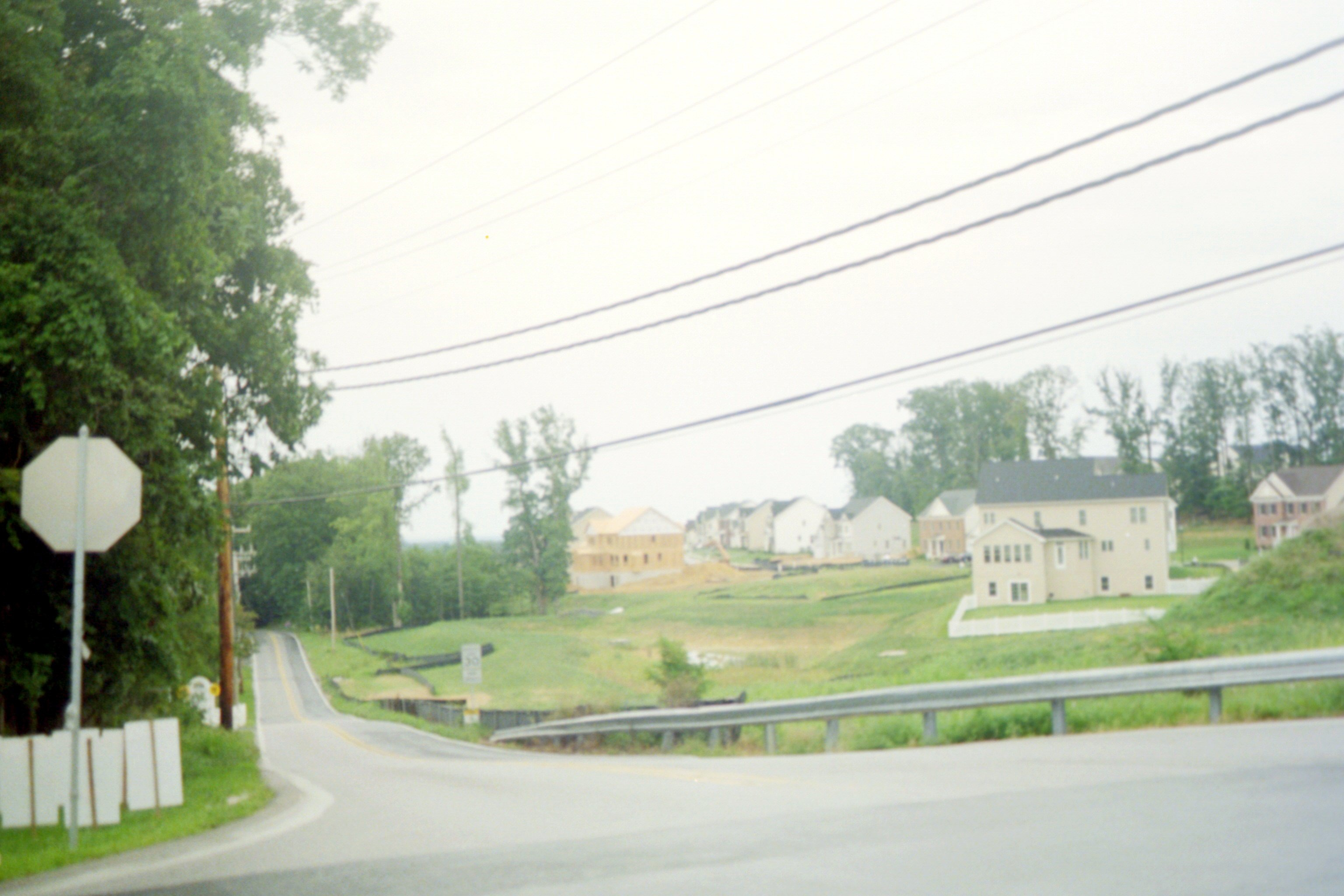
Housing development in Ilchester, 2011

Ilchester is located at 39°15′03″N 76°45′53″W (39.2509, −76.7647). It is situated in Howard County, between Ellicott City to the northwest and Elkridge to the southeast. Columbia is to the southwest. The Patapsco River forms the northeast boundary of the community and serves as the county line, with Baltimore County and the community of Catonsville across the river.

The original mill community of Ilchester is located along the Patapsco River at the junction of Ilchester and Bonnie Branch Roads. However, the current CDP extends southwest to include the suburban terrain of Howard County outside of the Patapsco River valley. Maryland Route 103, Montgomery Road, is the main local road through the CDP. Maryland Route 100 is a freeway that runs through the southern part of Ilchester, serving the community at Exit 4 with Montgomery Road. To the south, Route 100 intersects with Interstate 95, which forms the southeastern boundary of the Ilchester CDP.

According to the United States Census Bureau, the CDP has a total area of 10.8 square miles (28.0 km^{2}), of which 10.7 square miles (27.8 km^{2}) is land and 0.08 square miles (0.2 km^{2}), or 0.57%, is water.

== Demographics ==
Historical population
| Census | Pop. | Note | %± |
|---|---|---|---|
| 2010 | 23,476 | | — |
| 2020 | 26,824 | | 14.3% |
U.S. Decennial Census

=== 2020 census ===
As of the 2020 census, Ilchester had a population of 26,824. The median age was 36.8 years. 26.3% of residents were under the age of 18 and 9.6% of residents were 65 years of age or older. For every 100 females there were 96.3 males, and for every 100 females age 18 and over there were 93.5 males age 18 and over.

97.2% of residents lived in urban areas, while 2.8% lived in rural areas.

There were 9,357 households in Ilchester, of which 41.6% had children under the age of 18 living in them. Of all households, 61.3% were married-couple households, 12.7% were households with a male householder and no spouse or partner present, and 20.9% were households with a female householder and no spouse or partner present. About 18.5% of all households were made up of individuals and 5.9% had someone living alone who was 65 years of age or older.

There were 9,590 housing units, of which 2.4% were vacant. The homeowner vacancy rate was 0.6% and the rental vacancy rate was 4.1%.

Racial composition as of the 2020 census
| Race | Number | Percent |
|---|---|---|
| White | 14,252 | 53.1% |
| Black or African American | 3,424 | 12.8% |
| American Indian and Alaska Native | 98 | 0.4% |
| Asian | 5,294 | 19.7% |
| Native Hawaiian and Other Pacific Islander | 4 | 0.0% |
| Some other race | 1,570 | 5.9% |
| Two or more races | 2,182 | 8.1% |
| Hispanic or Latino (of any race) | 2,823 | 10.5% |

== See also ==
- Ilchester Tunnel (B&O Railroad)
