= Granite, Maryland =

Unincorporated community in Maryland, United States

- Unincorporated community
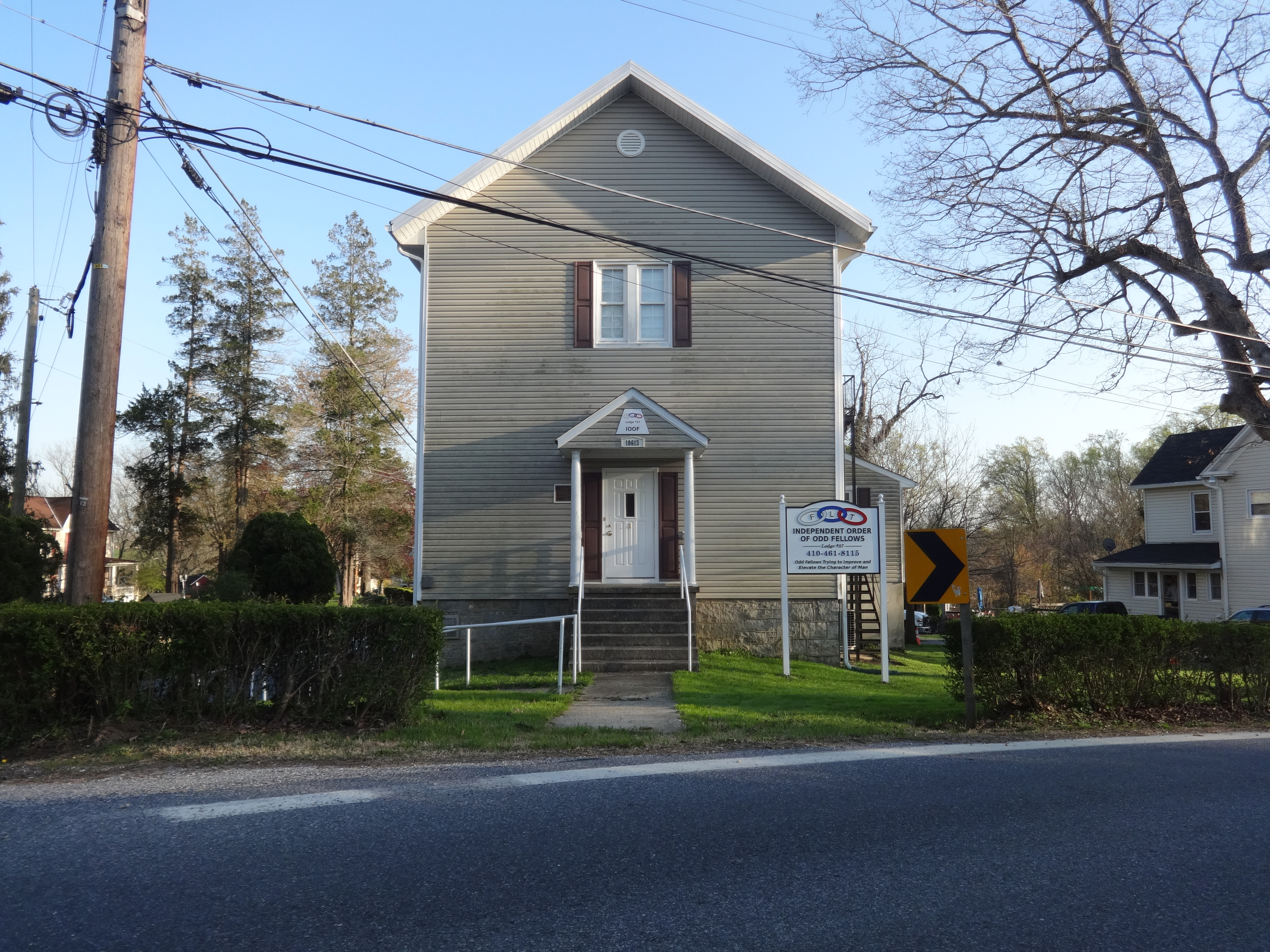
- FLT Independent Order of Odd Fellows Lodge Baltimore City No. 57 in Granite

- Location within the State of Maryland Granite, Maryland (the United States)
- Coordinates: 39°20′34″N 76°51′20″W
- Country: United States
- State: Maryland
- County: Baltimore
- Elevation: 459 ft (140 m)
- Time zone: UTC-5 (Eastern (EST))
  - Summer (DST): UTC-4 (EDT)
- GNIS feature ID: 590353

Granite is an unincorporated community in Baltimore County, Maryland, United States. Originally known as Waltersville, it was renamed Granite in recognition of its principal product (the Woodstock Quartz Monzonite was quarried). The village was the center of this industry, which during its peak in the late 19th century provided building materials for major projects throughout the eastern seaboard, including the Baltimore Customs House and parts of the Library of Congress in Washington D.C.

The Granite Historic District was listed on the National Register of Historic Places in 1994.

The Nike Missile Base BA-79 was located in Granite. It was active from 1954 to 1974.

In 1999, final scenes of The Blair Witch Project were filmed in the Griggs House in Patapsco Valley State Park. The state planned on demolishing the historic structure until publicity from the movie brought contributors for its preservation. The house was demolished at a later date without an announcement.

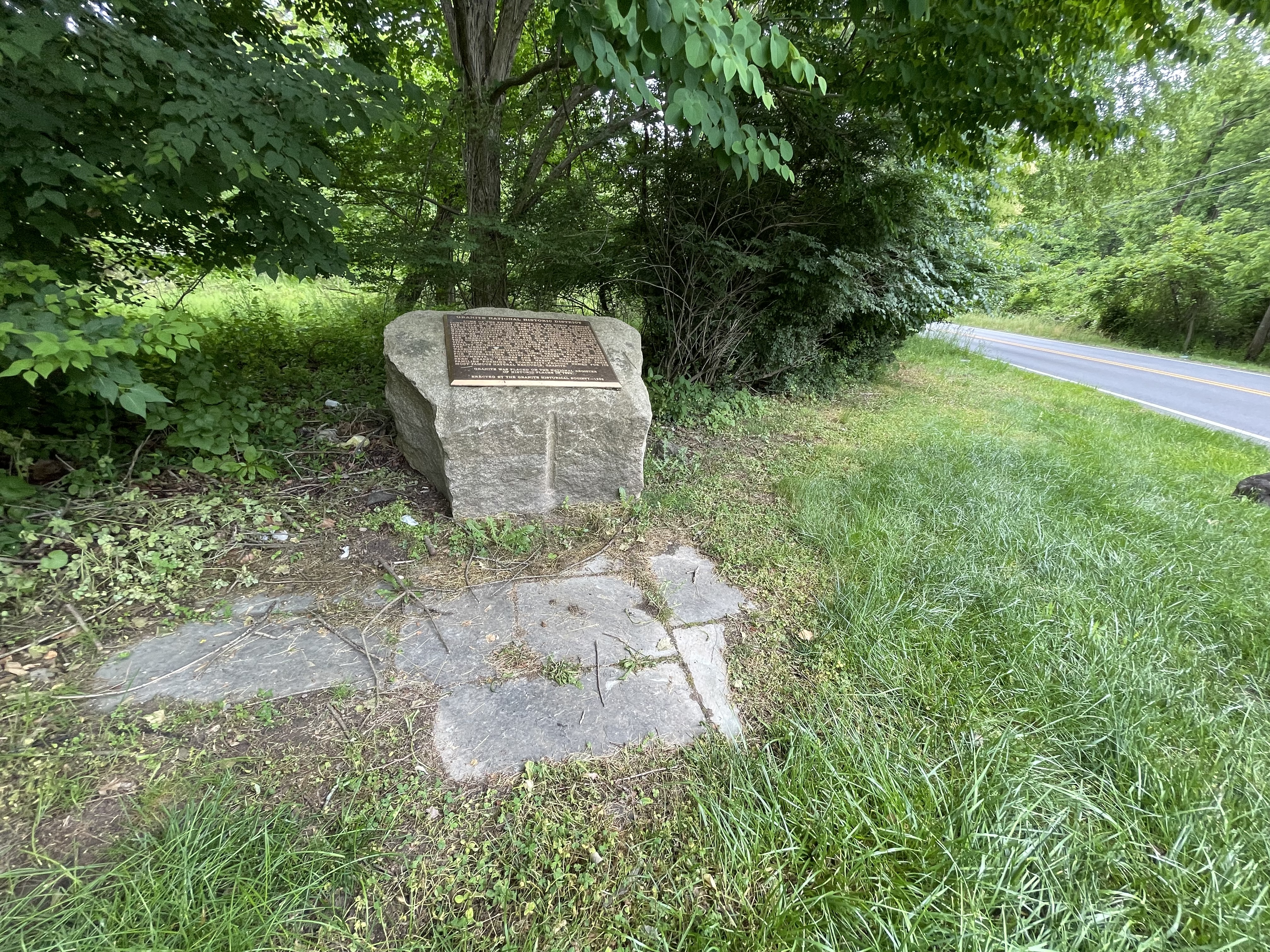
Plaque commemorating the creation of the Granite National Historic District
