= Sarah Collins Fernandis =

American social worker

- Born: March 8, 1863; Port Deposit, Maryland, U.S.
- Died: July 11, 1951 (aged 88); Baltimore, Maryland, U.S.
- Resting place: Arbutus Memorial Park
- Occupation(s): Social worker, educator, writer, settlement worker

Sarah A. Collins Fernandis (March 8, 1863 – July 11, 1951) was an American social worker, writer, and community leader, based in Baltimore, Maryland. She organized settlement houses in Washington, D.C., and Rhode Island, and worked for improved living conditions and healthcare for Black city residents.

== Early life ==
Sarah Collins was born in Port Deposit, Maryland, during the American Civil War, and raised in Baltimore, the daughter of Caleb Alexander Collins and Mary Jane Driver Collins. Her father worked at a lumberyard after the war, and her mother was a laundress. She earned an undergraduate degree from Hampton Institute in 1882, and a master's degree in social work from New York University. She wrote the lyrics to the Hampton Institute alma mater.

== Career ==
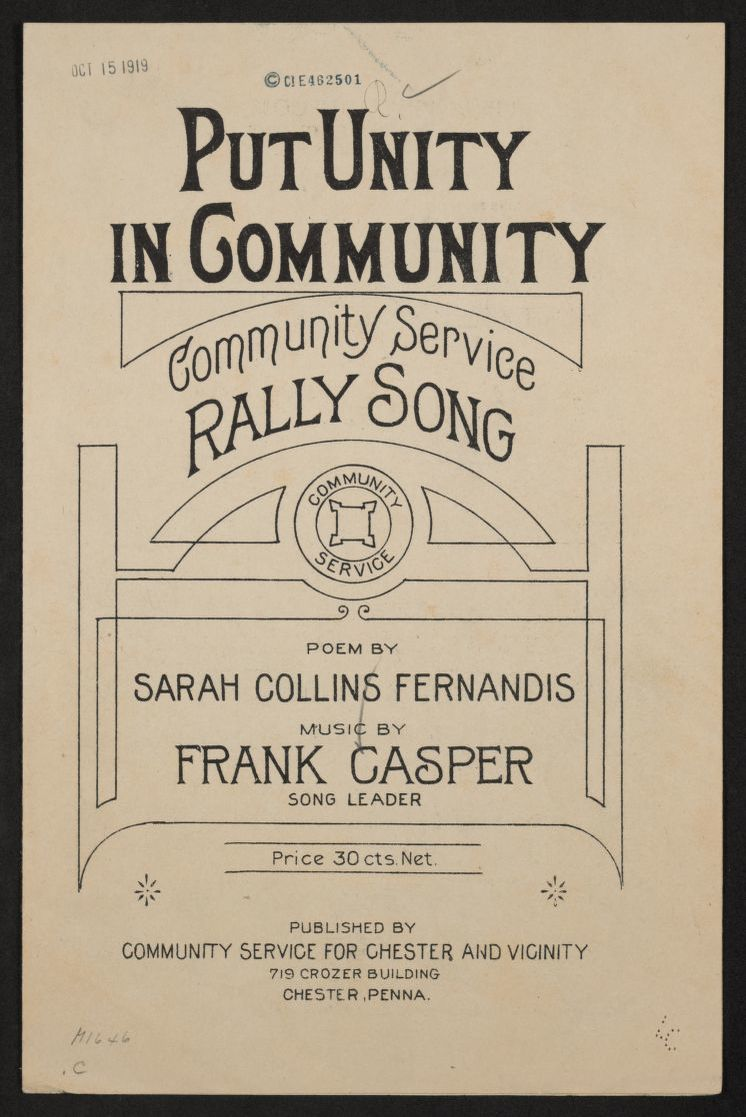
"Put Unity in Community" (1919), a rally song written by Sarah Collins Fernandis, music by Frank Casper, in the collection of the Library of Congress.

Collins taught school for about twenty years, in Virginia, Maryland, Tennessee, Georgia, and Florida, sometimes under the auspices of the Women's Home Missionary Society of Boston. She organized and led the Colored Social Settlement House in Washington, D.C., in 1902. She later was head resident at another settlement house in East Greenwich, Rhode Island from 1908 to 1912. She improved the houses and their neighborhoods with libraries, classrooms, clinics, playgrounds, childcare, events, and even basic banking services.

She was founder and president of the Women's Cooperative Civic League in 1913, and during World War I she organized a War Camp Community Center for Black soldiers stationed in Pennsylvania. In 1920, she became the first Black social worker employed by the Baltimore public health department. She organized to establish the Henryton State Hospital for Black tuberculosis patients. She retired from the city health department in 1933, but opened a National Youth Administration office in 1936, to help place homeless young women in employment and housing. She also lectured for the National League of Women Voters, lobbied for compulsory school attendance laws and for quality low-income housing.

Fernandis wrote songs for her educational and community-building work, and her poems were often published in the Southern Workman. She published two volumes of poetry, Poems and Vision, in 1925.

== Personal life ==
Sarah Collins married barber John Fernandis in 1902. Sarah Collins Fernandis died in 1951, aged 88 years, in Baltimore. There is a room at the YMCA in Baltimore named for Fernandis. She was buried in Arbutus Memorial Park.
