= Ammendale Normal Institute =

Former school in Maryland, US

- U.S. National Register of Historic Places
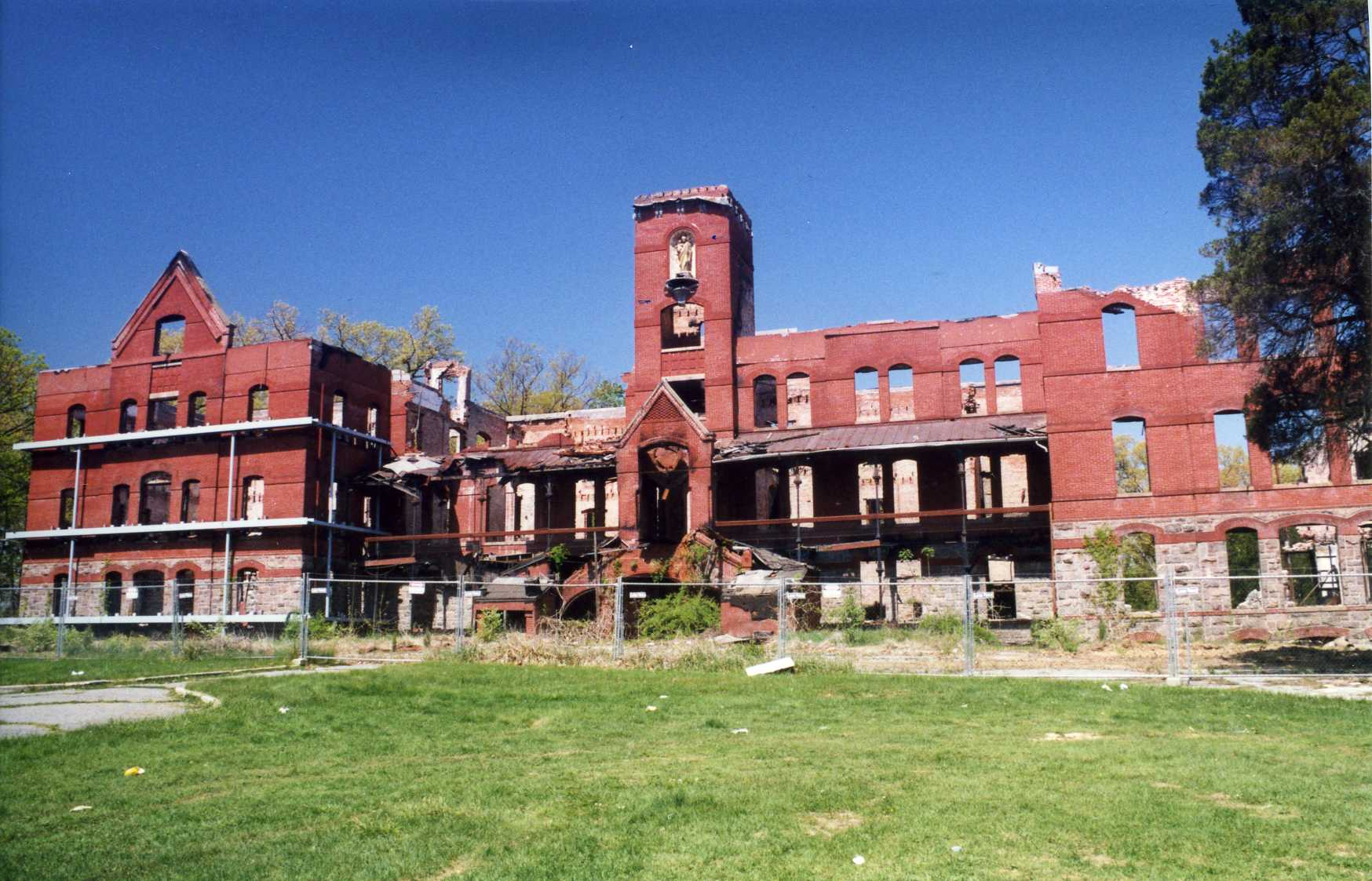
- Ruins of the main building before it was demolished

- Location within Maryland Location within the United States
- Location: Jct. of Ammendale Rd. and U.S. 1, Beltsville, Maryland
- Coordinates: 39°3′8″N 76°54′5″W
- Built: 1880
- Architectural style: Italianate, Queen Anne
- NRHP reference No.: 75002081
- Added to NRHP: April 14, 1975

The Ammendale Normal Institute is a U.S. historic location in Beltsville, Maryland. Bought in 1880, it was a school and novitiate operated by the Institute of the Brothers of the Christian Schools. The Ammendale area is named after the previous owner, Daniel Ammen.

Construction of the main building began in 1883 and was completed in 1884 with Thomas C. Kennedy as the leading architect.

== Religious use ==
Also known as "Christian Brothers" and "Ammen Institute," the building had seen several uses over its lifetime. Though it last served as a sort of "retirement home" for aging or retired Brothers; in recent history, it was also used as an active monastery. Peter Boyle is a notable alumnus of what has been described as the monastery's 'boot-camp'.

The main building suffered a devastating fire in April, 1998. Its ruins stood until late 2006 when what was left of the building was demolished. Ammendale was one of many historical buildings in the region with valuable real estate that was developed after a fire set to the structure, including Troy Hill (1990), Avondale Mill (1991), St. Mary's College (1997), Henryton State Hospital (2007), (2011) In 2014, NAI Michael placed 8 acres containing the foundation of the Normal Institute and the remaining historic brick barn up for sale. The nearby St. Joseph's Catholic Chapel is a recognized historic site. There is also a parish cemetery and one for the Brothers.

== St. Joseph’s Catholic Chapel ==
St. Joseph's Catholic Chapel, built in 1880, on 20 acres of land for a novitiate plus five acres for the church donated by Admiral Daniel Ammen, from whom the Ammendale name is derived. It is a front-gabled brick chapel with ornate Queen Anne detail. Jigsawn vergeboards adorn the eaves of the principal gable front, the gothic-arch windows are filled with stained glass, and the interior walls and ceilings are sheathed with pressed tin in a pattern of fleurs-de-lis, palmettes, and a rich, multicourse cornice. A large cemetery adjoins the chapel.

== Gallery ==
Buildings at the Ammendale Normal Institute
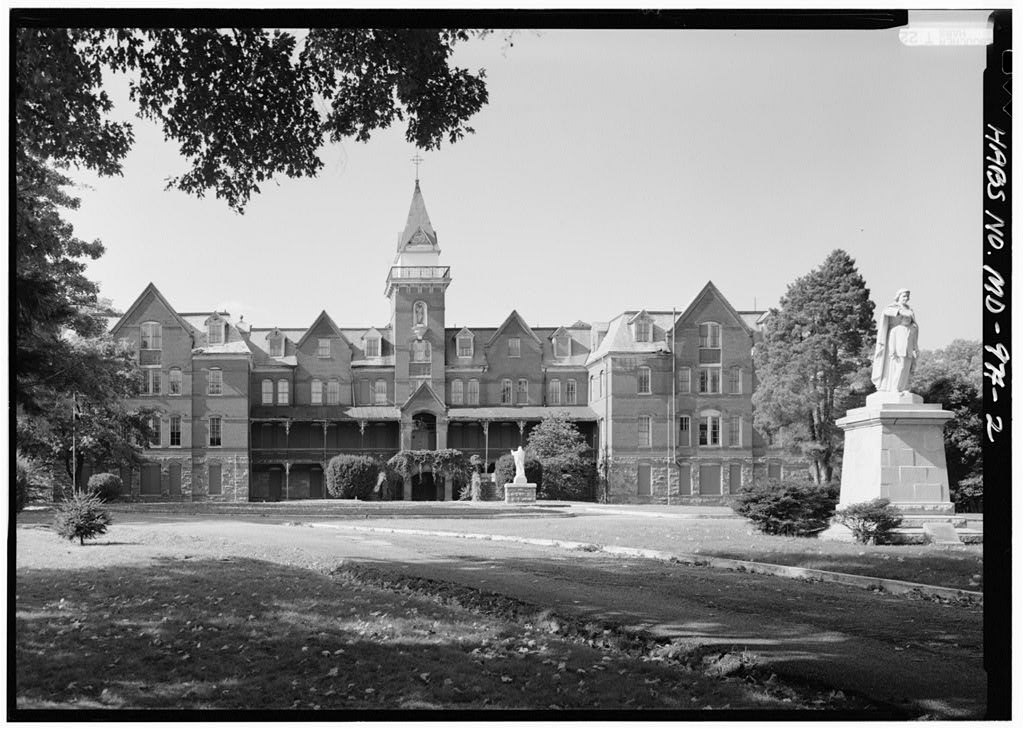
Front of the main building at Ammendale Normal Institute

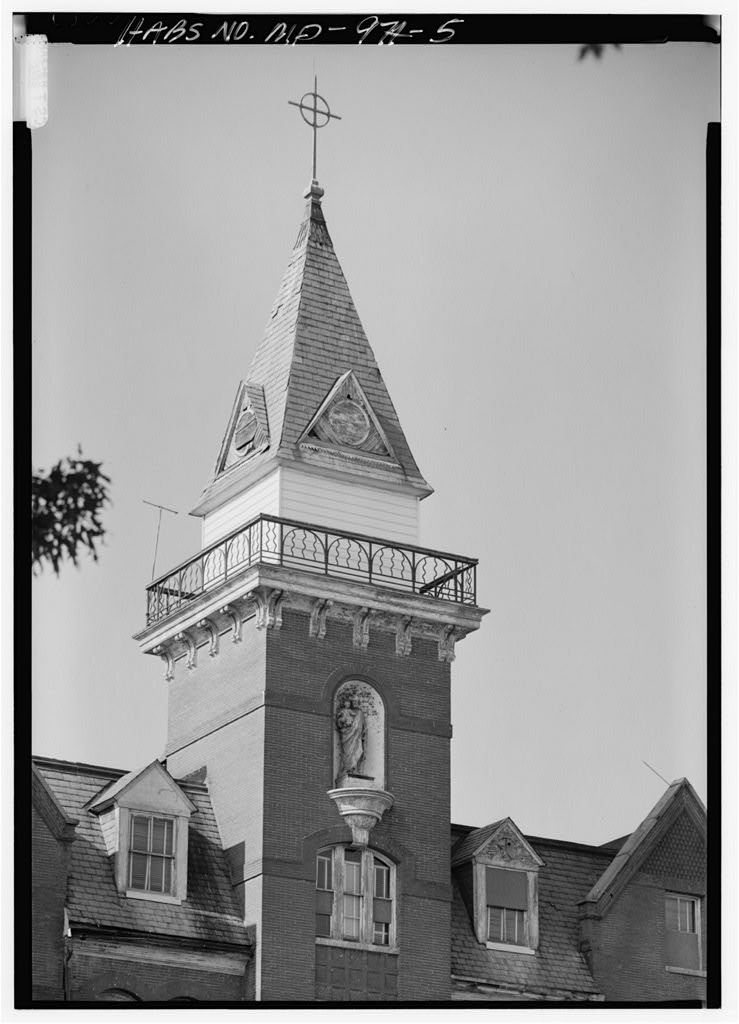
Spire on the Main Building at Ammendale Normal Institute

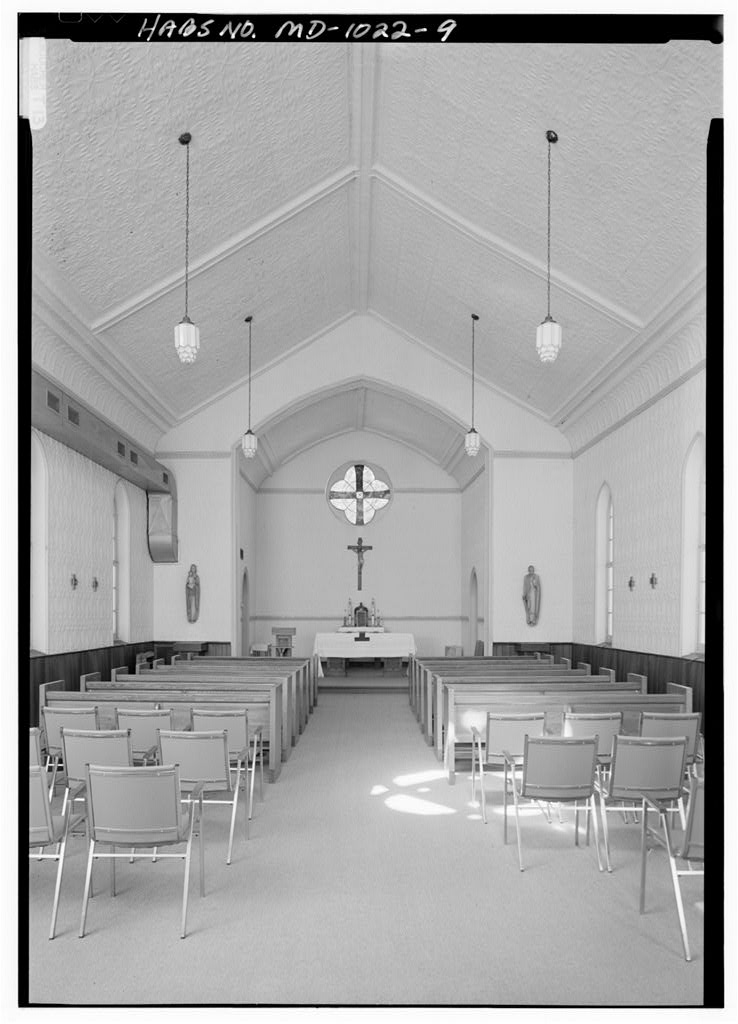
The interior of St. Joseph's Chapel, Ammendale Normal Institute.

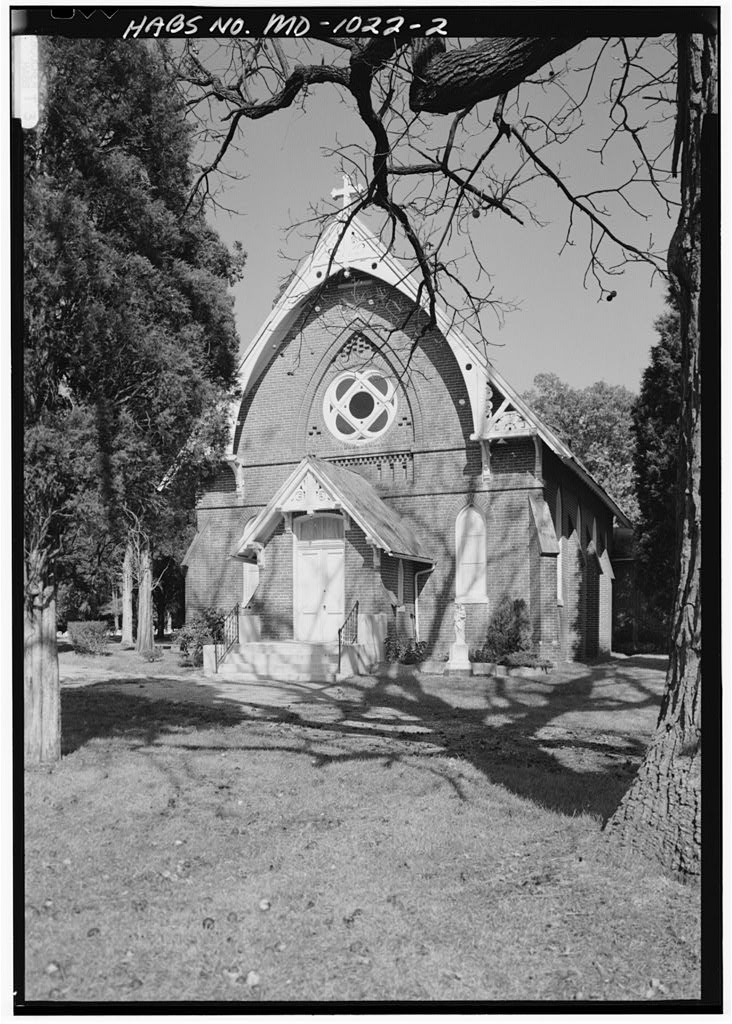
The exterior of St. Joseph's Chapel at the Ammendale Normal Institute
