= Henryton State Hospital =

Coordinates: 39°21′14.1″N 76°54′55.4″W

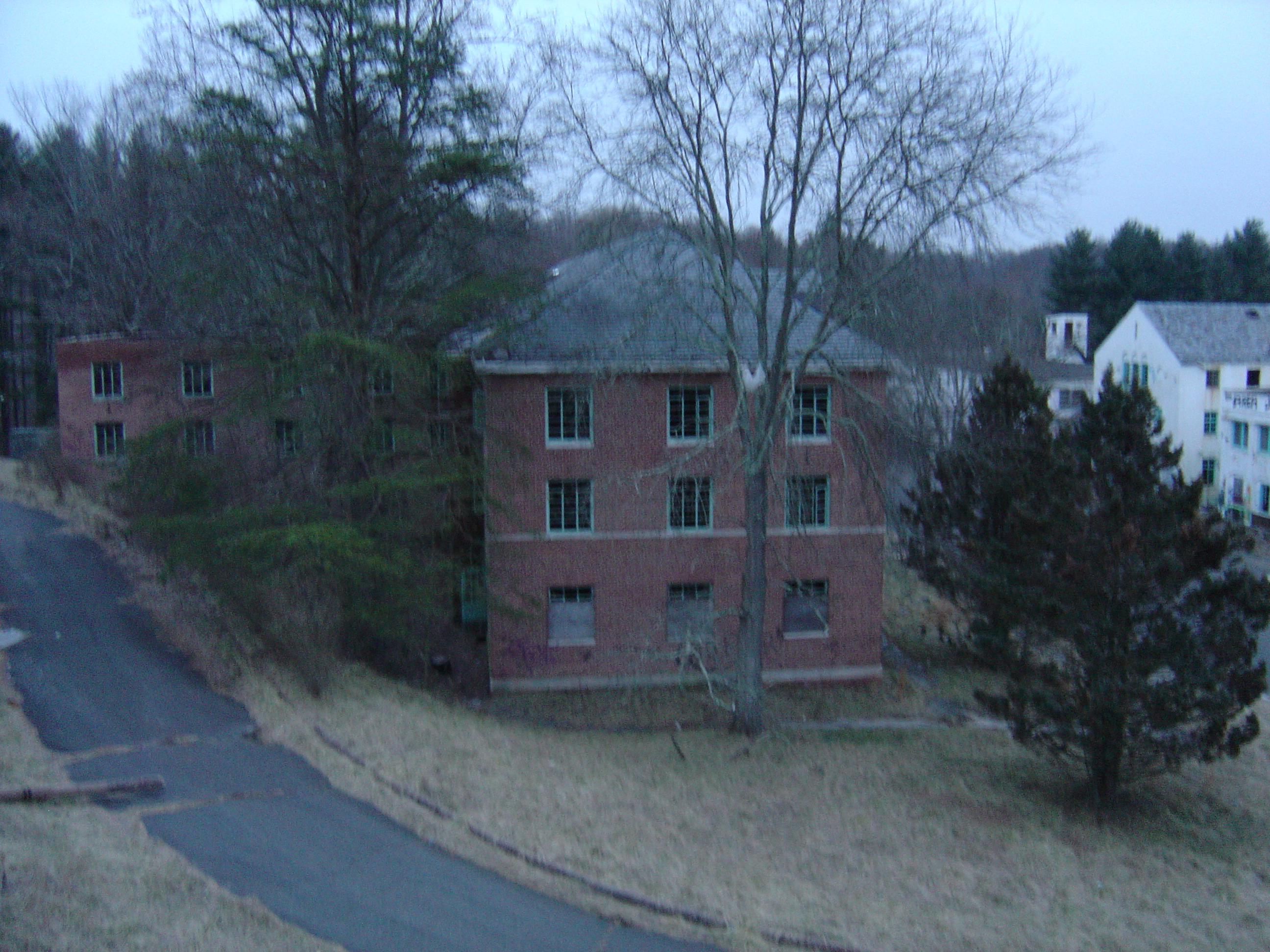
- Original administration building

Geography
- Location: Marriottsville, Carroll County, Maryland, Maryland, United States

Organization
- Type: Specialist

Services
- Speciality: African American Tuberculosis hospital, rehabilitation hospital

History
- Former name: Henryton Tuberculosis Sanatorium
- Opened: 1922
- Closed: 1985
- Demolished: 2013

Links
- Lists: Hospitals in Maryland

Henryton State Hospital is a now-demolished hospital complex in Marriottsville, in southern Carroll County, Maryland, just across the Howard County line. The complex was located within Patapsco Valley State Park and along its southern end runs CSX's Old Main Line Subdivision and is very close to the Henryton Tunnel. The Henryton State Hospital center, or the Henryton Tuberculosis Sanatorium as it was called, was erected in 1922 by the Maryland Board of Mental Hygiene. It was established as a facility to treat African Americans suffering from tuberculosis. This was one of the first such facilities in Maryland erected to provide African Americans with the same level of treatment as white people. Other accounts state that this was more of containment Hospital rather than a treatment facility. They contend that Henryton was used more for the exile and quarantine of tuberculosis patients.

The original complex opened in 1922 and consisted of six main buildings and one utility plant. These buildings were erected between the years of 1921 and 1923. The establishment of the Henryton Sanatorium was one of the final steps in Maryland's program to treat all of the state's tubercular patients. In the late twenties and early thirties the tuberculosis rate among African Americans in Maryland was quadruple the rate among whites. This placed a heavy burden on the hospital to deal with the increasing number of patients. In 1938 the hospital was budgeted $270,000 for the construction of new buildings to house 200 more patients. A refrigerated morgue was demanded after the hospital cremated and disposed of the remains of an African American child before the parents were contacted. The new buildings roughly doubled the size of the overall facility, and several more municipal buildings added even more space to the complex. However, by the time the new buildings were completed in 1946, the tuberculosis rates had dropped, leaving much more room than was necessary.

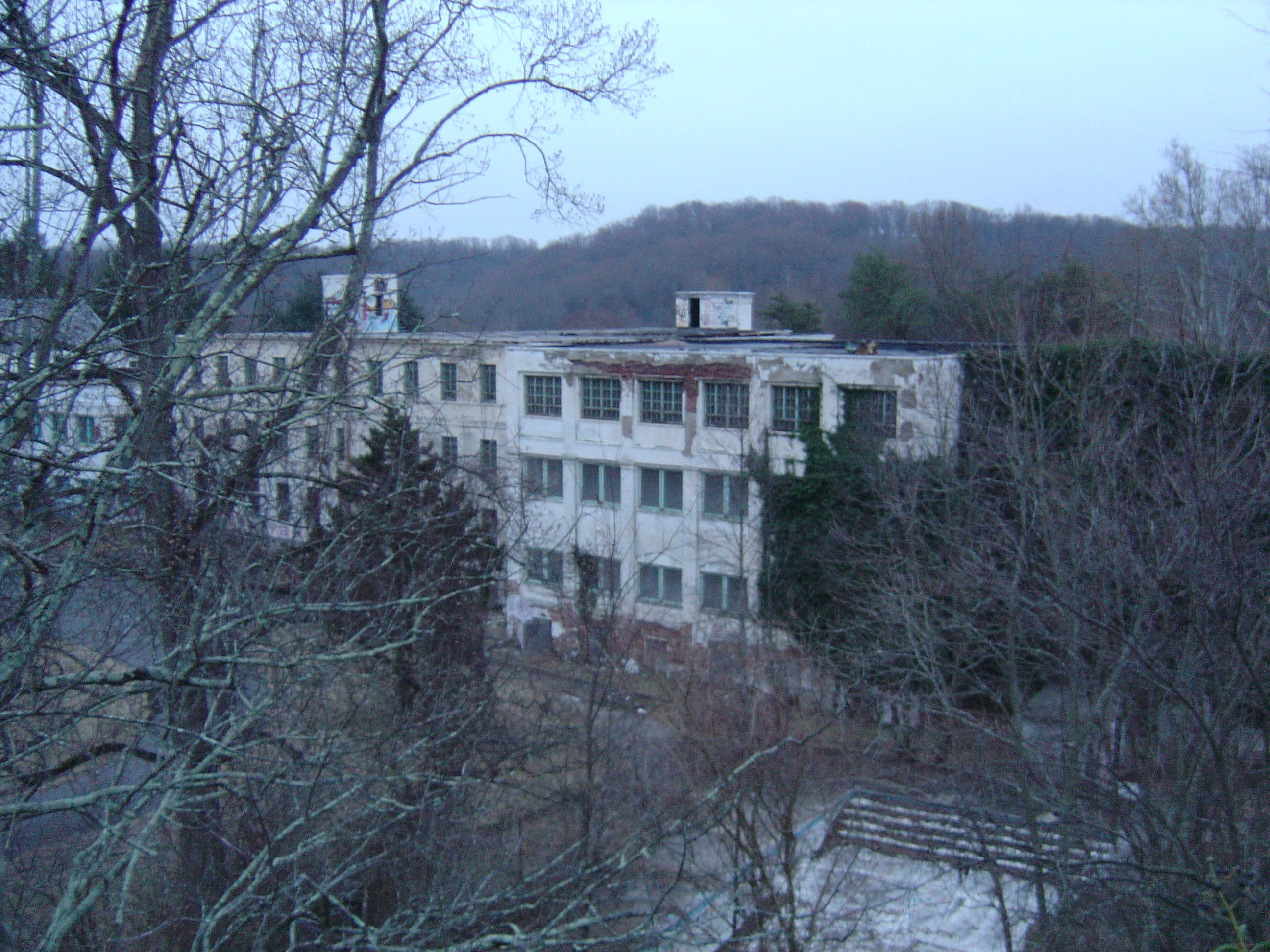
The newer building at the complex

== Henryton State Hospital Center ==
In 1963 the Maryland Board of Mental Hygiene and the Department of Health merged to become the Maryland Department of Health and Mental Hygiene (DHMH). As part of the act that created the new department, Henryton Sanatorium became the Henryton State Hospital Center. The hospital ended operations as a tuberculosis treatment facility and was converted to serve as a facility for the training and rehabilitation of “severely and profoundly retarded ambulatory [Maryland] residents ages eighteen and over”.

The hospital was not, in fact, used as a facility to treat the "criminally insane," contrary to the popular belief. The location, and layout, combined with the almost total lack of security, not to mention the complete lack of anything remotely resembling prisoner enclosures, would not have been conducive to the complex serving as even a minimum security facility.

At the time the hospital reopened in 1963, there were 200 residents living at Henryton out of the allowable 330. Once the renovation and conversion of the facility was fully completed in the early 1950s, the maximum occupancy was 400 patients. The rehabilitation program was a great success and returned many of its patients to their respective communities and some to the workforce. Admission to the hospital was covered by the Mental Retardation Administration, a division of Maryland Special Services, for new patients and through the Rosewood State Hospital for patients already receiving care elsewhere. Henryton also ran a respite care program with admission by special request.

In 1972, Hurricane Agnes swept away the Henrytown Bridge which served the facility and Henrytown road since the early 1800s.

The American mindset in the late seventies and early eighties shifted from institutionalization to more outpatient and home care which led to decreasing resident numbers at Henryton. The Maryland DHMH decided to end the training program in 1984 because of the low numbers of enrollment and residents. In 1985, Henryton had fewer than 100 resident patients and operations at the center were being phased out. By the fall of 1985, the facility was emptied, locked, boarded up, and closed for good. Henryton State Hospital was not present on the Maryland DHMH budget for fiscal year 1986.

== Closing ==
In the decades since the facility's closure, the Henryton State Hospital complex had become popular with urban explorers, vandals, drifters, and drug addicts. The facade of most of the buildings had been extensively damaged and are covered in graffiti. Most of the windows were broken out, making the grounds around the hospital very dangerous. The doors to all of the buildings had been broken in, allowing access to the inside. Although the furnishings and equipment were removed before the facility closed, there was still remarkable damage from people going through. Visiting the Henryton State Hospital complex without the express written consent of the Maryland DHMH is trespassing, but the possible charges and fines seem not to deter most vandals. However, the decades of wear on the buildings without maintenance and the presence of large quantities of asbestos made Henryton a dangerous place to explore.

Henryton has also been the site of many suspicious fires since its closure, the most well-known taking place in the early morning of December 19, 2007. The blaze raged for three and half hours, caused heavy damage to the main building, and took eighty firefighters from three counties to extinguish. Henryton again caught fire on April 28, 2011. This incident damaged the roof of a four-story building and required the assistance of firefighters from four counties.

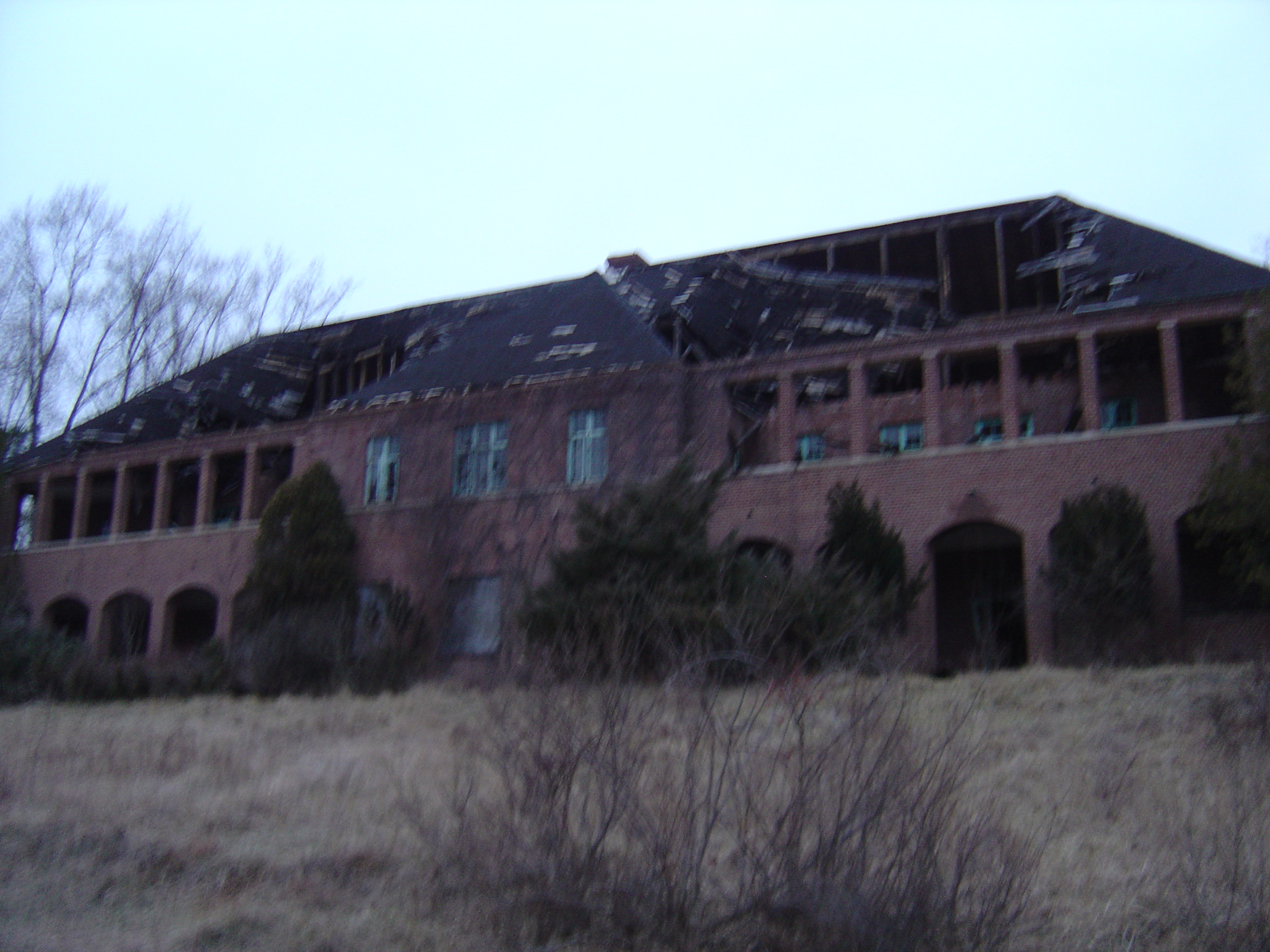
Henryton has suffered from extensive damage over the years

The hospital was one of many historical buildings in the region with valuable real estate that was lost to arson, including Troy Hill (1990), Avondale Mill (1991), Ammendale Normal Institute (1998), Phelps Log Cabin – moved from North Laurel to Elkridge (2001), and Thistle Manufacturing Company (2003).

== Rehabilitation efforts ==
After closing, several groups and individuals showed interest in buying the property from its owner, the Maryland Department of Health and Mental Hygiene. The most determined among these was a non-profit organization which was founded specifically for the rehabilitation and preservation of the Henryton State Hospital. Starting in Spring 2008, Save Henryton worked to save the abandoned property.

On April 15, 2012, another fire was started in the Henryton complex that resulted in the destruction of the roof of one of the main buildings. With an increase of recurring vandalism and the costs and risk to firefighters, the Carroll County Government once again pushed for demolition of the property. $3.5 million had been allocated to the razing of Henryton (including asbestos removal) beginning in Spring 2013, with over $2 million planned in 2014 to complete the demolition. Despite rumors to the contrary, the state of Maryland had not removed the funds from the 2013 budget.

== Demolition ==
Henryton State Hospital had been slated on the state's capital budget to remove asbestos and raze the building. The schedule for the Maryland Department of General Services originally showed that the buildings were to be demolished in May 2014, according to testimony from the FY13 capital budget proposal. Recent fires and emergency calls pushed the Department of General Services to act.

The project was originally approved for about $3.05 million, though the Department of General Services stated it would cost a little over $4 million. The project was completed in September 2013. A site wall with a small plaque is all that remains on site. The property will be reincorporated to the Patapsco Valley State Park which surrounds it. Grass has been planted over the former buildings' original locations.

== See also ==
- Patapsco Valley State Park
- Urban Exploration
- Glenn Dale Hospital
- Griggs House
- Sarah Collins Fernandis
