= Howard County Department of Planning and Zoning =

Government department of Howard County, Maryland

The Howard County Department of Planning and Zoning (DPZ) manages planning and development in Howard County, Maryland, a Central Maryland jurisdiction equidistant between Baltimore, Maryland and Washington, D.C.

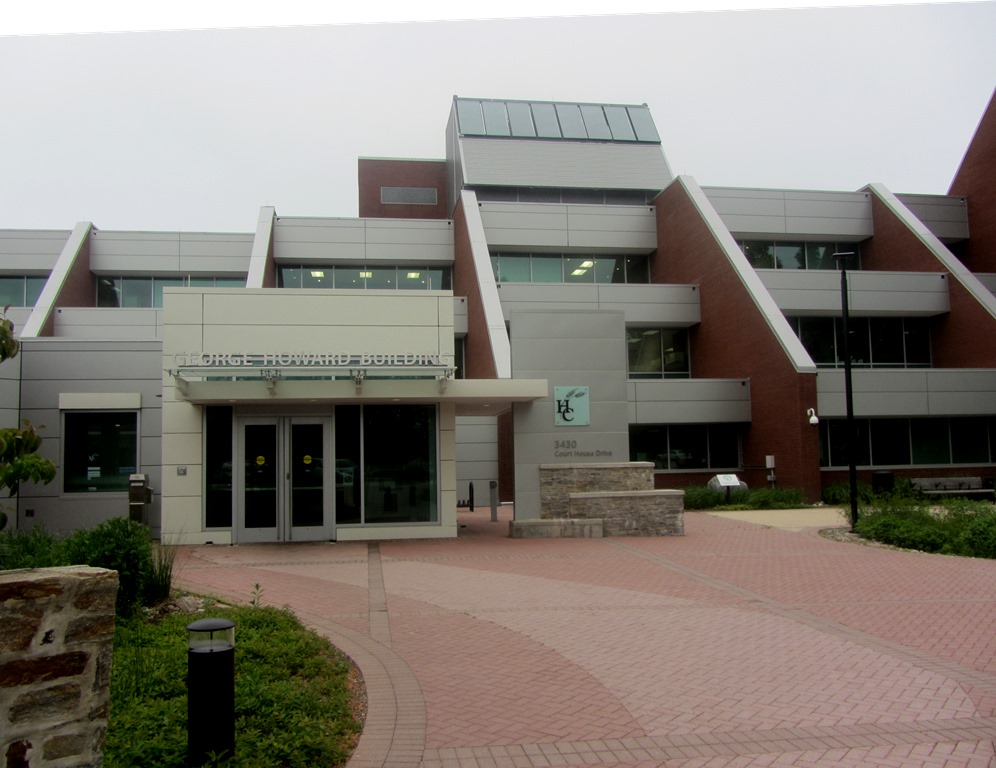
George Howard Building in 2014

Land use in Howard County has evolved over time. Roughly 60 percent of land in Howard County is dedicated, protected for rural uses, with the remaining 40 percent shifting over time from suburban to focused, mixed use nodes. Affluent Howard County offsets higher infrastructure costs of low-density development with high-valued homes that generate greater property and transfer taxes.

The Department of Planning and Zoning provides staff and guidance to several citizen volunteer boards, including the Planning Board, the Agricultural Land Preservation Board the Historic District Commission, the Design Advisory Panel, and the Cemetery Preservation Advisory Board.

The Director of the Department operates as executive secretary of the planning board with five members with five-year terms. The planning board advises on comprehensive zoning, the General Plan, amendments to the zoning regulations, and conditional uses. The Board also is the design authority for most sketch plans and certain site development plans.

The department recommends zoning regulations to align with the County general plan. As of 2013, the county operates 41 separate zoning classifications. A comprehensive zoning review occurs every ten years. Zoning regulations are also created and changed in "comp-lite" reviews, as well as from council bills.

== History ==
Planning was managed by the state of Maryland until the First edition of Howard County Subdivision and Land Development Regulations on 7 March 1961

- 1934 – Elkridge became the first in county to deploy water without federal aid.
- 1943 – The Metropolitan District was formed to bring water and sewer to Ellicott City, sponsored by P.G. Stromberg, I.H. Taylor, Charles E. Miller, Murray G. Peddicord, John A. Lane, and W. Emil Thompson.

The Zoning Enabling Act of 1948 was formed to create a zoning board of all three County Commissioners. James Macgill was the Zoning Commissioner. Established first set of zoning ordinances.

Norman E. Moxley was Chairman in 1951.

In 1951 the Department proposed the first county subdivision regulations.

In 1954, the department created the first County Zoning Code.

In 1956 it approved the regulation of subdivisions.

- 1958 – First county sewer plan adopted to provide county-wide low-density service.
- 1960 – Planning department releases "A Planning Policy and Design Concept for Howard County". Recommended travel to Baltimore's central business district for commercial activity.
- 1961 – 1976 "Loop-hole" subdivisions period. Family subdivisions and 5 acre or larger lots are exempt from subdivision regulations.
- Wilmer M Sanner was the Planning Commission Chairman from 1962-1967. He sold the majority of his 73 acres (30 ha) Simpsonville farm to Howard Research and Development prior to the public announcement of the Columbia project.
- 1965 – Rouse lawyer Jack Jones briefs county planners that without awarding "New Town" zoning, the board would have to conduct 120,000 individual zoning hearing for the land they just purchased.
- 1965 -"New Town" (Columbia) zoning passed as an amendment to existing zoning ordinances. Zoning recommenced 2.5 units per acre, minimum of 2500 acres, and 80% ownership by a single entity.

In 1968, J. Hugh Nichols was a member of the Planning Commission.

- 1971, December 8 – The County Council passes a 1971 General Plan for development, projecting 200,000 more residents by the year 2000 than the current population of 61,000.
- 1977, October 3. Comprehensive zoning maps updated.
- 1980, April 13, Former planning director and retiring Judge, James MacGill overturns rule that requires developers to set aside land for public use on large projects.
- 1981, November 1 – GOP recommends removing planning board member William P. Brendel for rezoning property he owned on the historic St. Charles College ruins for a more valuable use.
- 1983, A 20-year development strategy based on Montgomery County is authored by Robert K. McNamara from the National Association of Realtors to implement Planned Employment Centers, Floating Zones, and Density Exchanges against citizen opposition concerned about spot zoning.
- 1985 Comprehensive Rezoning focuses on townhome development projects at Long Gate, Mount Joy, Burliegh Manor, Turf Valley.
- 1988, The task force on development and growth is formed to respond to growth issues, the board which included former County Executive Edward L. Cochran and developer Earl Armiger recommended concentrating growth in areas that can sustain it.
- 1989 – A moratorium on residential construction is imposed by County Executive Elizabeth Bobo. It is lifted 18 months later.
- 1990 – General Plan update considered the first true growth management plan for Howard County.
- 1992 – Howard County Council adopts adequate public facilities ordinance, which places limits on residential construction based on capacity of public schools and roads. The legislation also creates the pacing of development through housing allocations. Western Howard county is mapped as Rural Conservation and Rural Residential, and Eastern Howard County is zoned for denser development.
- 1993 – The Howard County General Plan and Water and Sewer Plan are amended to bring public water to counter groundwater contamination at Alpha Ridge Landfill.
- 1997 – The State of Maryland passes "Smart Growth" legislation creating Priority Funding Areas (PFA) and zoning that supersedes local. Planning Director Joseph Rutter proposes a minimum housing density of 3.5 units per acre in PFA areas which overlap the entire county's water and sewer districts.
- 2004 – The 2004 Comprehensive Zoning Plan includes a Senior Housing Master Plan.
- 2006 – "Comp Lite" decreased time between comprehensive rezoning hearings.
- 2008 – Future County Council candidate Jon Weinstein is contracted through his company Line of Sight to implement program management processes and utilities to speed the land development process. The "P3" program included ProjectDox, Project Management, and ProjectStat.
- 2008 – 17 October The department of Planning and Zoning moves to Stanford Blvd.
- 2012 – PlanHoward was an update of the 2000 Howard County General Plan. The County's General Plan has historically been revised approximately every ten years (1960, 1971, 1982, 1990, 2000). Regular updates are necessary for guiding decisions related to development, land preservation, changing demographic and employment trends, neighborhood sustainability, capital projects, County services and other key issues. The plan was adopted by the County Council during its July 2012 legislative session.
- 2013 – New and revised zoning provisions for Route 1 corridor; new rural crossroads zoning, as well as farm friendly provisions.

== Operations ==
Marsha McLaughlin has been a planning commission from 2002 to the present.

== Programs ==
- Agricultural Preservation Program - Howard County has designated the Western Tier for agricultural preservation, leaving the central (Columbia/Ellicott City) and Eastern portions in a priority service area for denser development. State senator James A. Clark, Jr., a multigenerational owner of Clark's Elioak Farm, helped champion legislation to fund agricultural preservation. The program is partially funded through a combination of agricultural use-change taxes and transfer taxes from countywide new home sales and re-sales. The County pays the property owner small interest payments over thirty years for its development rights with a final balloon payment to the owner funded using 30 year zero coupon treasury obligation bonds.
