= Avondale Mill =

Historic site in Maryland, US

- U.S. National Register of Historic Places
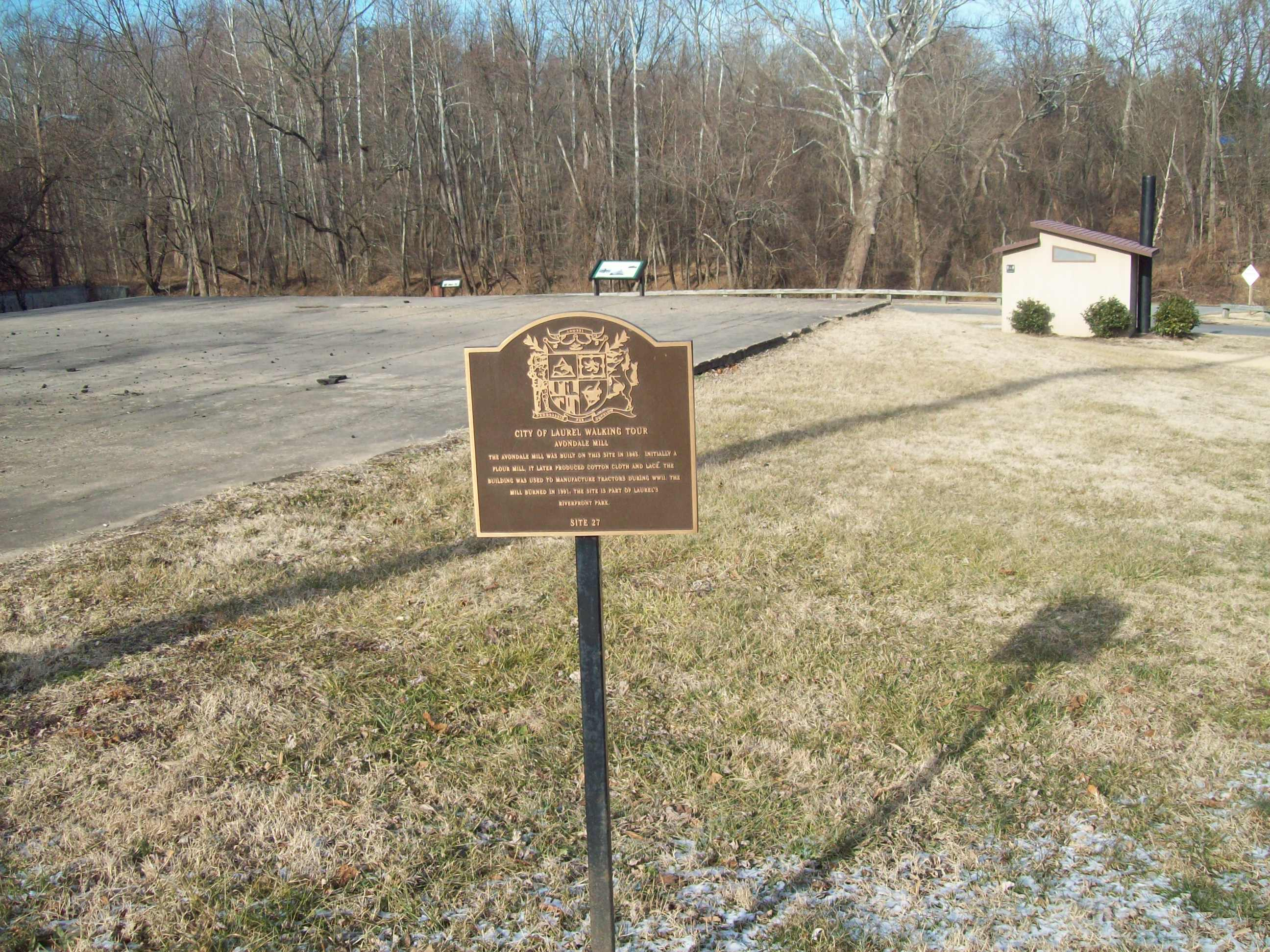
- Avondale Mill Site, January 2011

- Location within Maryland Location within the United States
- Location: 21 Avondale St., Laurel, Maryland
- Coordinates: 39°6′25″N 76°50′46″W
- Built: 1844
- NRHP reference No.: 79003267
- Added to NRHP: September 20, 1979

The Avondale Mill was a large gable-front stone structure, three stories in height, and 10 bays long by three wide. It was located on the bank of the Patuxent River in the city of Laurel, Prince George's County, Maryland. It was constructed in 1844–1845 for Captain William Mason & Son of Baltimore. It was complemented by the neighboring Laurel Mill built in 1811, S.D. Heath's machine shop, and Richard Israel's flouring mill. At that time it was provided with the machinery for the manufacture of fine cloth, running as many as 1,500 cotton spindles with 150 employees. In 1845, industrialist Peter Gorman was responsible for the first macadamized (paved) road in Laurel, Avondale Street next to the new Mill.

The mill was sold for $10,000 with a $13,000 ground rent in 1850 to S.P. Heath and James Arthur (Webb Heath & Co.). In the mid-1850s, it was converted to a gristmill. The waters of the Patuxent provided an 8–9 foot fall and gave the mill 60-70 horsepower to use, along with steam power fueled by coal from Cumberland as early as 1854. George William Brown purchased the 21.7 acre property and outbuildings from Benjamin F. Crabbs, but sold his holdings in a mortgage auction on 20 October 1897. By 1904, the mill employed only 4 people, but produced $10,400 in product annually. Avondale Mill was the only one of Laurel's 19th century mills to have survived into the late 20th century. A devastating fire on December 19, 1991, destroyed the mill. The remains were then demolished and the site cleared for use as a community park.

It was listed on the National Register of Historic Places in 1979.

== See also ==
- Laurel Mill

== Gallery ==
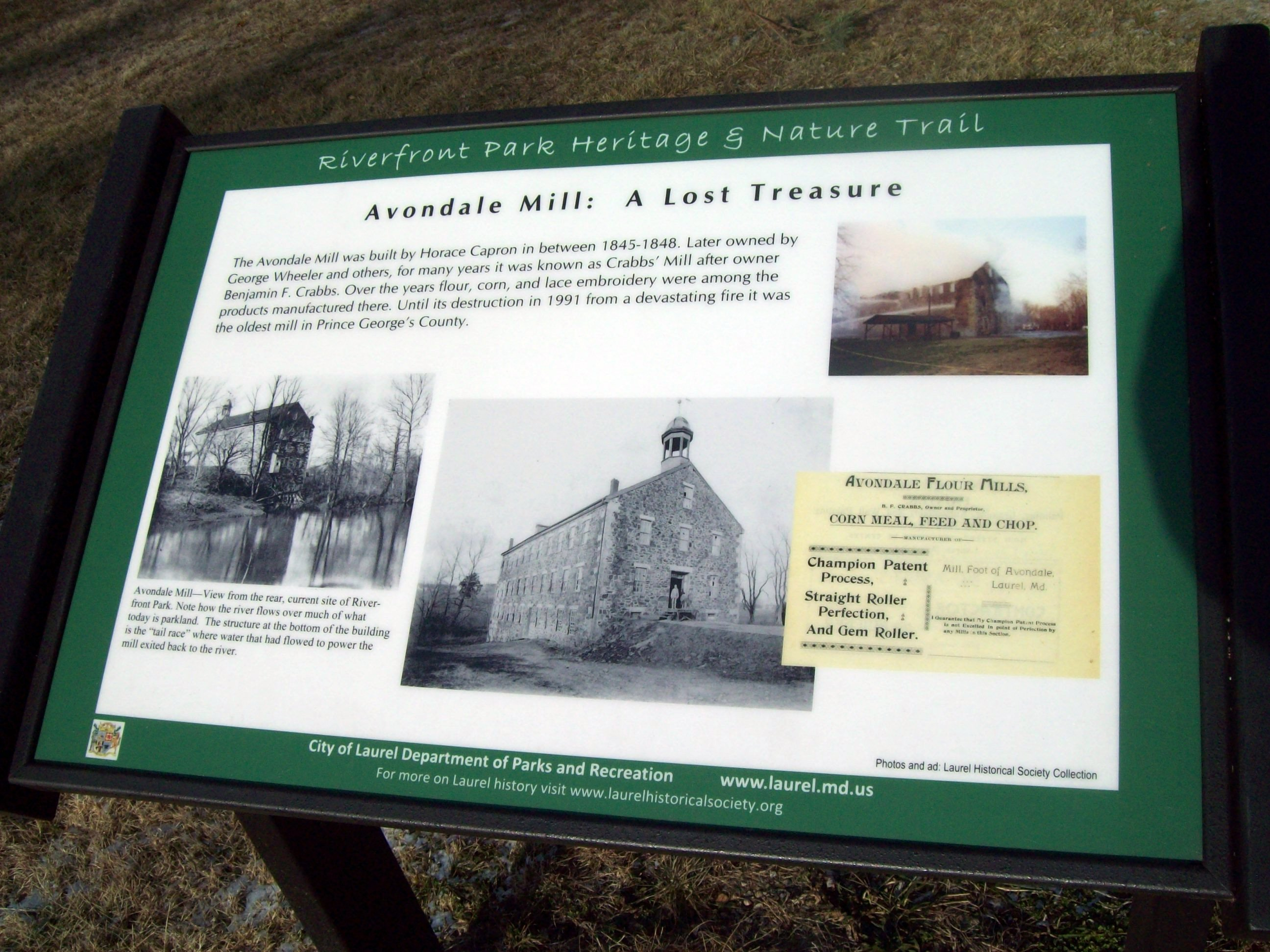
Avondale Mill Site Plaque, January 2011
