= First Baptist Church of Guilford =

Church in Maryland, United States

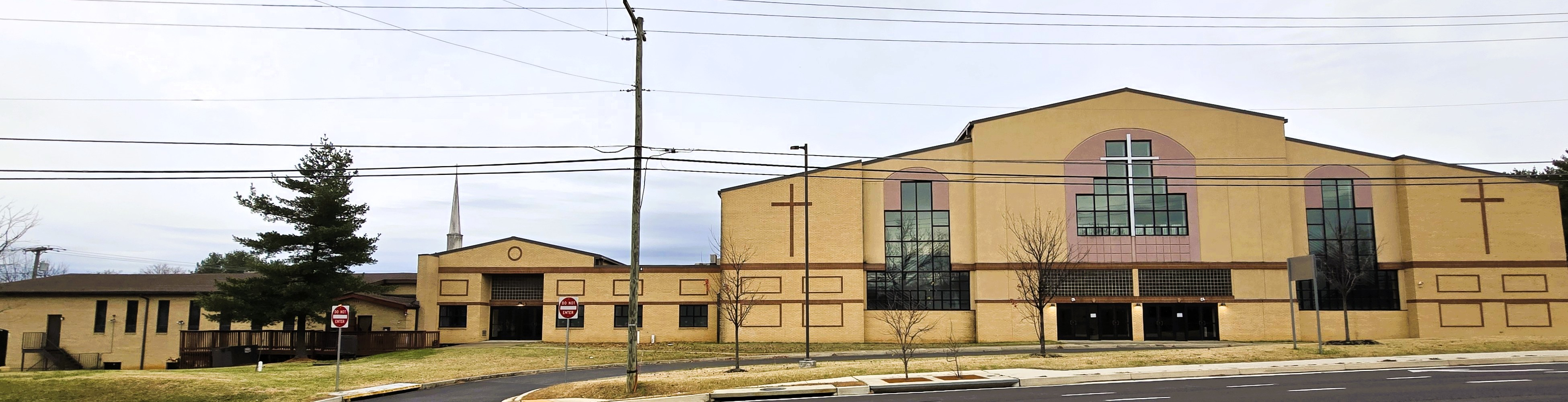
- First Baptist Church of Guilford from across Oakland Mills Road
- Interactive map of the First Baptist Church of Guilford area

General information
- Location: Columbia, Maryland
- Coordinates: 39.164693°N 76.831036°W
- Completed: 1900

First Baptist Church of Guilford, is a historic Baptist Church located at 7504 Oakland Mills Road in the Guilford section of Columbia, Maryland.

The church was founded in 1900 with its first building constructed in 1903.

== See also ==
- List of Howard County properties in the Maryland Historical Trust
- Asbury Methodist Episcopal Church (Annapolis Junction, Maryland)
- Brown Chapel United Methodist Church
- Daisy United Methodist Church
- First Baptist Church of Elkridge
- Hopkins United Methodist Church
- Locust United Methodist Church
- Mt. Moriah Lodge No. 7
- Mount Pisgah African Methodist Episcopal Church (Ellicott City, Maryland)
- St. Stephens African Methodist Episcopal Church
- West Liberty United Methodist Church
