= Mount Gregory United Methodist Church =

Church in Maryland, United States

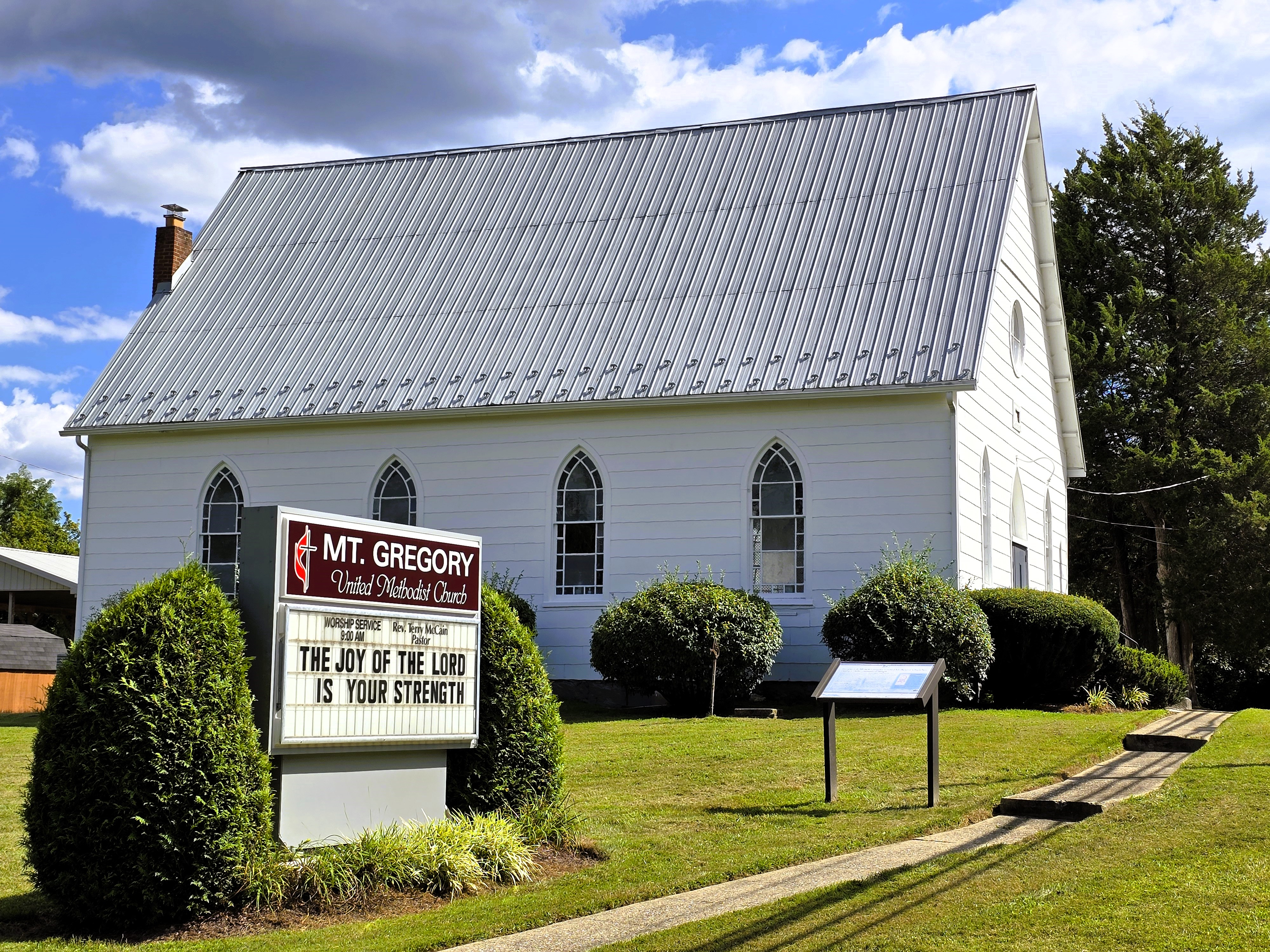
- Interactive map of the Mount Gregory United Methodist Church area

General information
- Location: 2325 Roxbury Mills Road, Cooksville, Maryland
- Coordinates: 39.307623°N 77.020755°W
- Completed: 1898

Height
- Roof: Shingle

Mount Gregory United Methodist Church is a historically black United Methodist Church located at 2325 Roxbury Mills Road in Cooksville, Maryland. The building was constructed in 1898.

== See also ==
- List of Howard County properties in the Maryland Historical Trust
- Asbury Methodist Episcopal Church (Annapolis Junction, Maryland)
- Brown Chapel United Methodist Church
- Daisy United Methodist Church
- First Baptist Church of Elkridge
- Hopkins United Methodist Church
- Locust United Methodist Church
- Mt. Moriah Lodge No. 7
- Mount Pisgah African Methodist Episcopal Church (Ellicott City, Maryland)
- St. Stephens African Methodist Episcopal Church
- West Liberty United Methodist Church
