= Simpson-Poplar Springs African Methodist Episcopal Church =

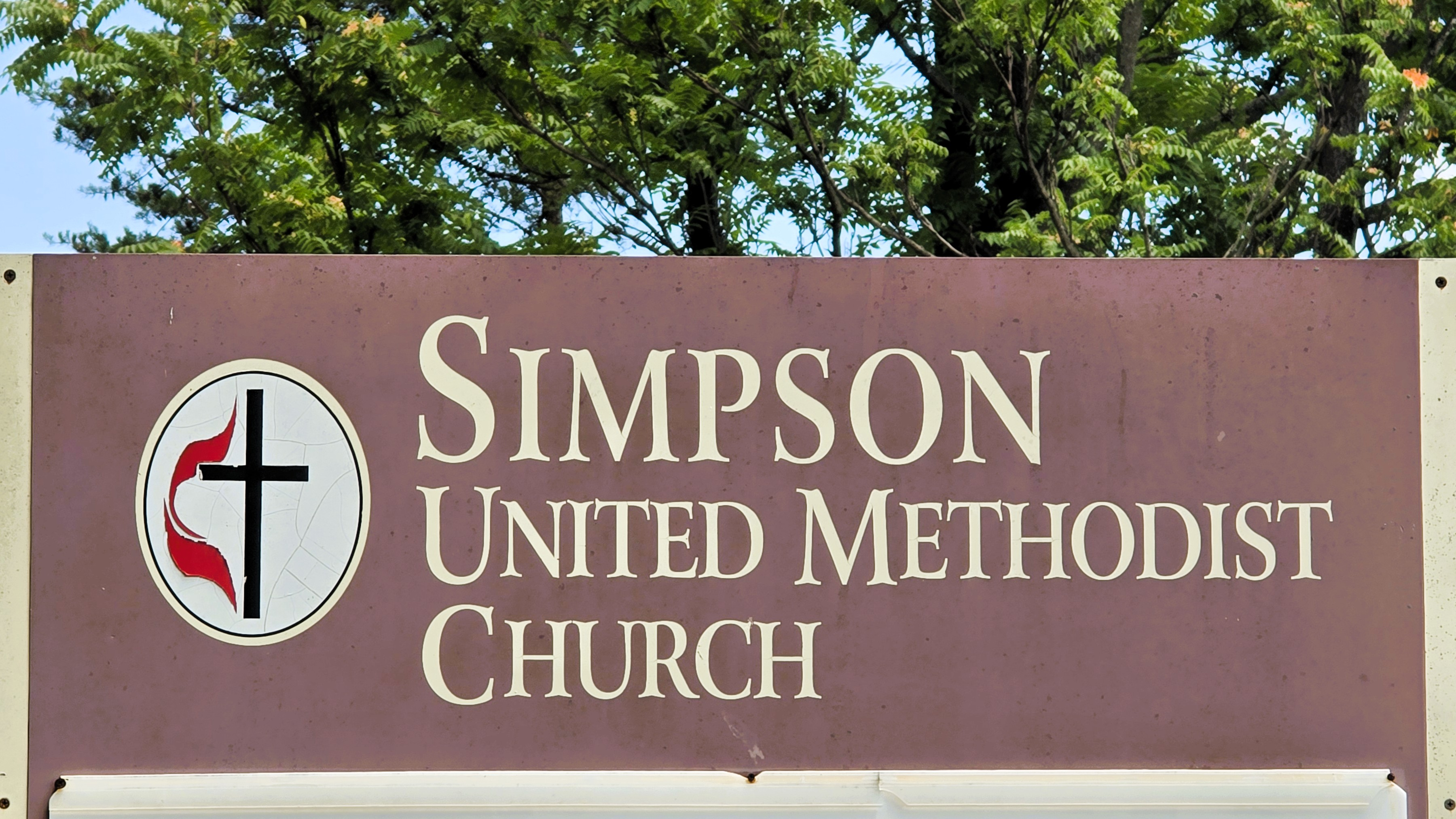

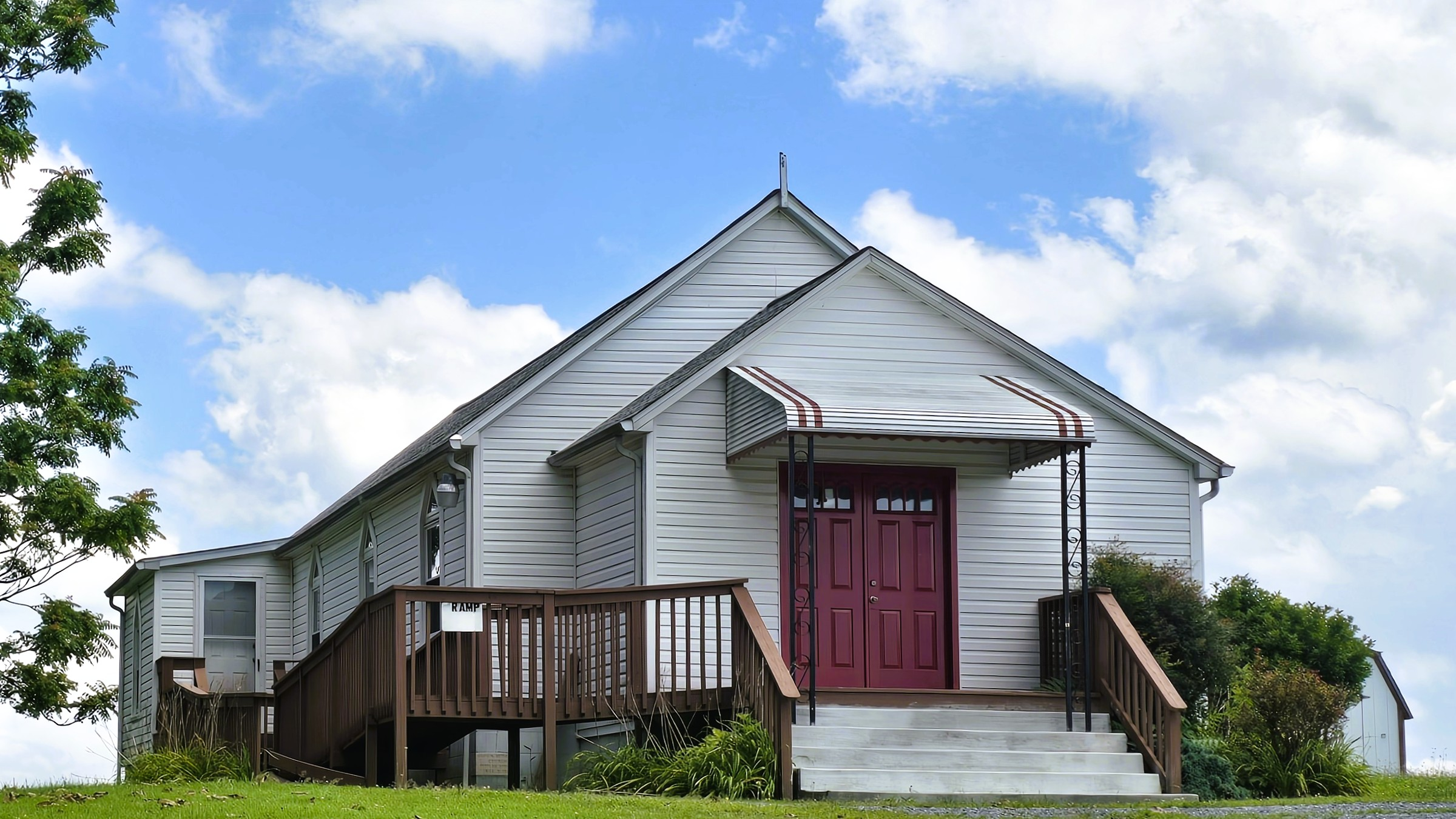
- Interactive map of the Simpson-Poplar Springs African Methodist Episcopal Church area

General information
- Location: Poplar Springs, Maryland
- Coordinates: 39.338438°N 77.101397°W
- Completed: 1893

Height
- Roof: Shingle

Simpson-Poplar Springs African Methodist Episcopal Church is a historic African Methodist Episcopal Church located at 16901 Hardy Road in Poplar Springs, near Mount Airy, Maryland.

The building was constructed in 1893.

== See also ==
- Asbury Methodist Episcopal Church (Annapolis Junction, Maryland)
- Brown Chapel United Methodist Church
- Daisy United Methodist Church
- First Baptist Church of Elkridge
- Hopkins United Methodist Church
- Locust United Methodist Church
- Mt. Moriah Lodge No. 7
- St. Stephens African Methodist Episcopal Church
- West Liberty United Methodist Church
