= St. Luke African Methodist Episcopal Church (Ellicott City, Maryland) =

Church in Maryland, United States

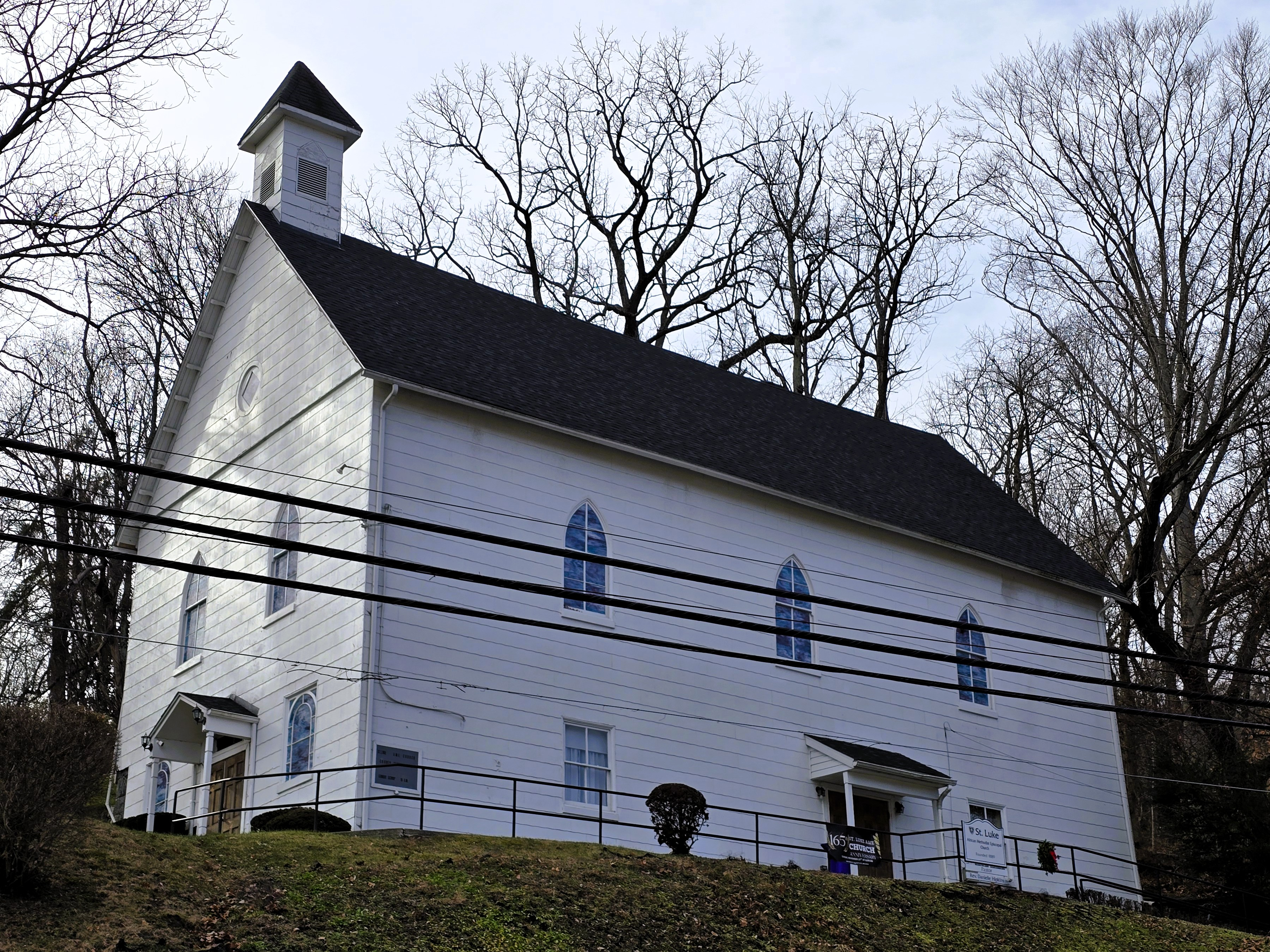
- The church in 2025
- Interactive map of the St. Luke African Methodist Episcopal Church area

General information
- Location: Ellicott City, Maryland, 8411 Main Street
- Coordinates: 39.268541°N 76.801416°W
- Completed: 1889

Height
- Roof: Shingle

Website
- stlukeame-ellicottcity.org

St. Luke African Methodist Episcopal Church is a historic African Methodist Episcopal Church located at 8411 Main Street in Ellicott City, Maryland.

The building was constructed in 1889.

== See also ==
- Asbury Methodist Episcopal Church (Annapolis Junction, Maryland)
- Brown Chapel United Methodist Church
- First Baptist Church of Elkridge
- Hopkins United Methodist Church
- Locust United Methodist Church
- Mt. Moriah Lodge No. 7
- St. Stephens African Methodist Episcopal Church
