= West Liberty United Methodist Church =

Church in Maryland, United States

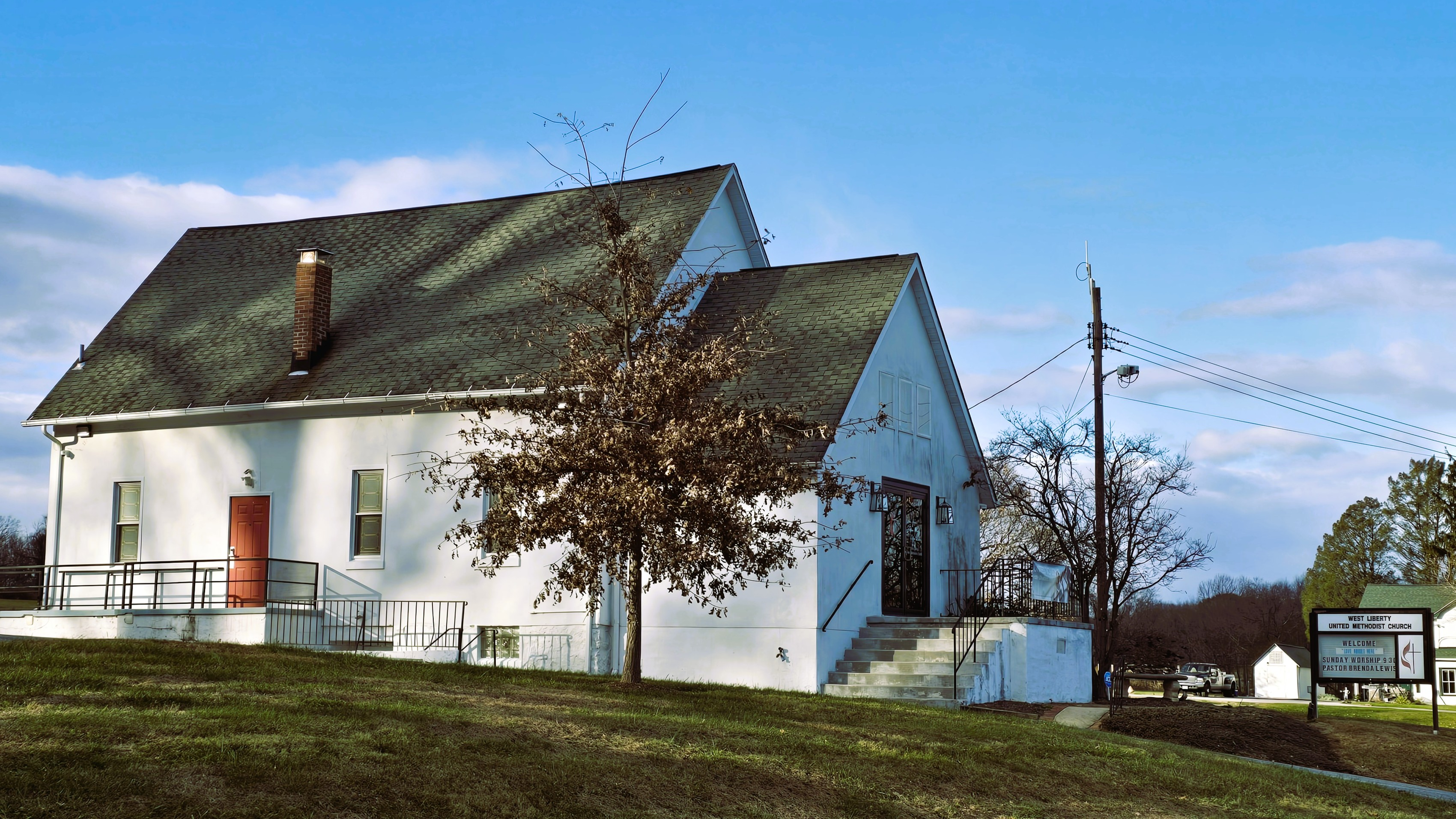
- West Liberty United Methodist Church in November 2025
- Interactive map of the West Liberty United Methodist Church area

General information
- Location: Marriottsville, Maryland, 2000 Sand Hill Road
- Coordinates: 39.316075°N 76.928754°W
- Completed: 1890

Height
- Roof: Shingle

West Liberty United Methodist Church is a historically black United Methodist Church located at 2000 Sand Hill Road in Marriottsville, Maryland.

The building was constructed in 1890.

== See also ==
- Asbury Methodist Episcopal Church (Annapolis Junction, Maryland)
- Brown Chapel United Methodist Church
- Daisy United Methodist Church
- First Baptist Church of Elkridge
- Hopkins United Methodist Church
- Locust United Methodist Church
- Mt. Moriah Lodge No. 7
- St. Stephens African Methodist Episcopal Church
