= Daisy United Methodist Church =

Church in Maryland, United States

Daisy Church
- Daisy United Methodist Church
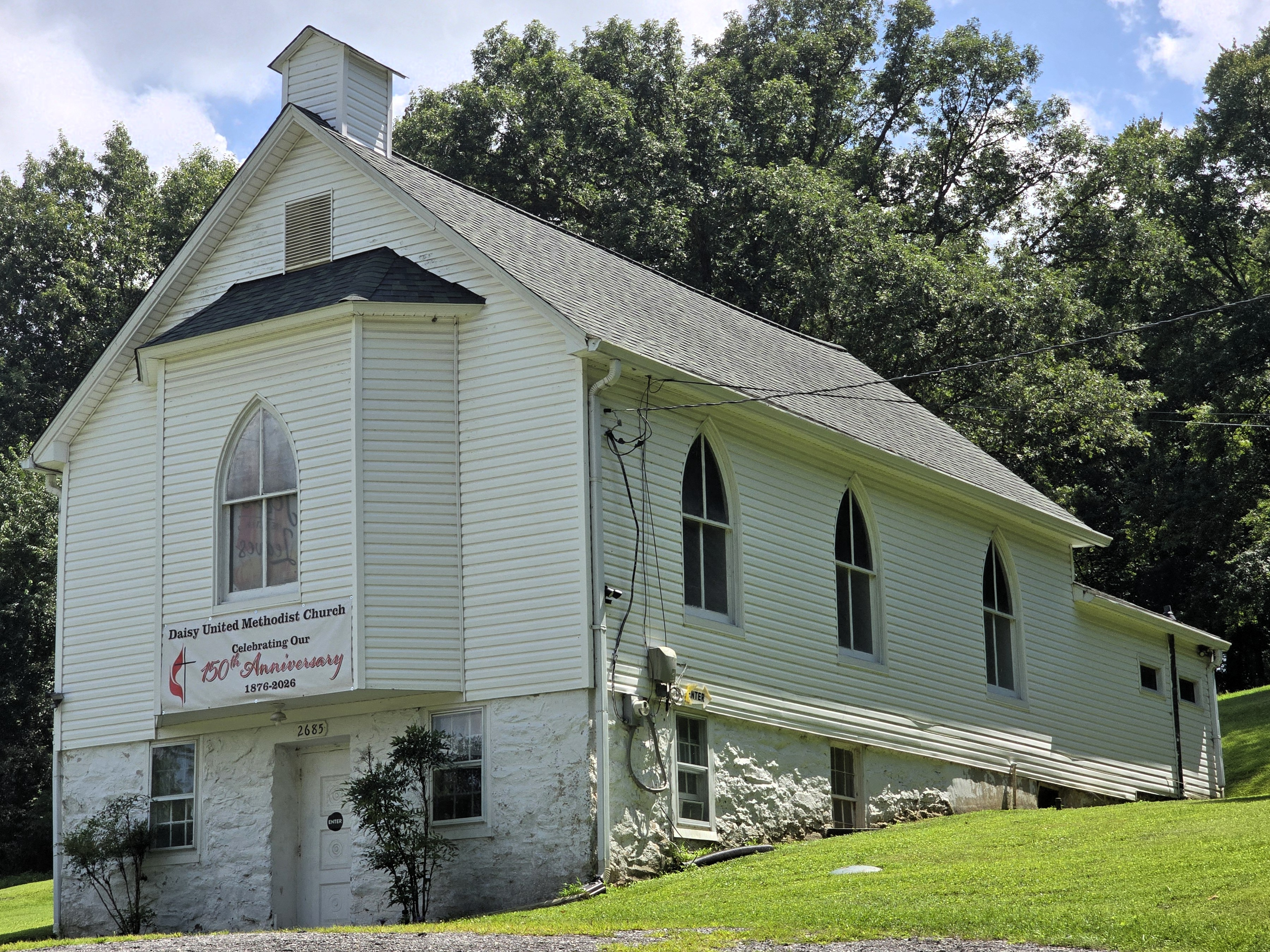
- Daisy Church
- 39.298634°N 77.065093°W
- Location: 2685 Daisy Road; Woodbine, Maryland 21797
- Country: United States
- Language: English
- Denomination: United Methodist
- Website: daisyumc.org

Architecture
- Completed: 1890

Clergy
- Pastor: Kathy Duppins-Smallwood

Daisy United Methodist Church, is a historic African American Church located at 2685 Daisy Road in Woodbine, Maryland. The building was constructed in 1890.

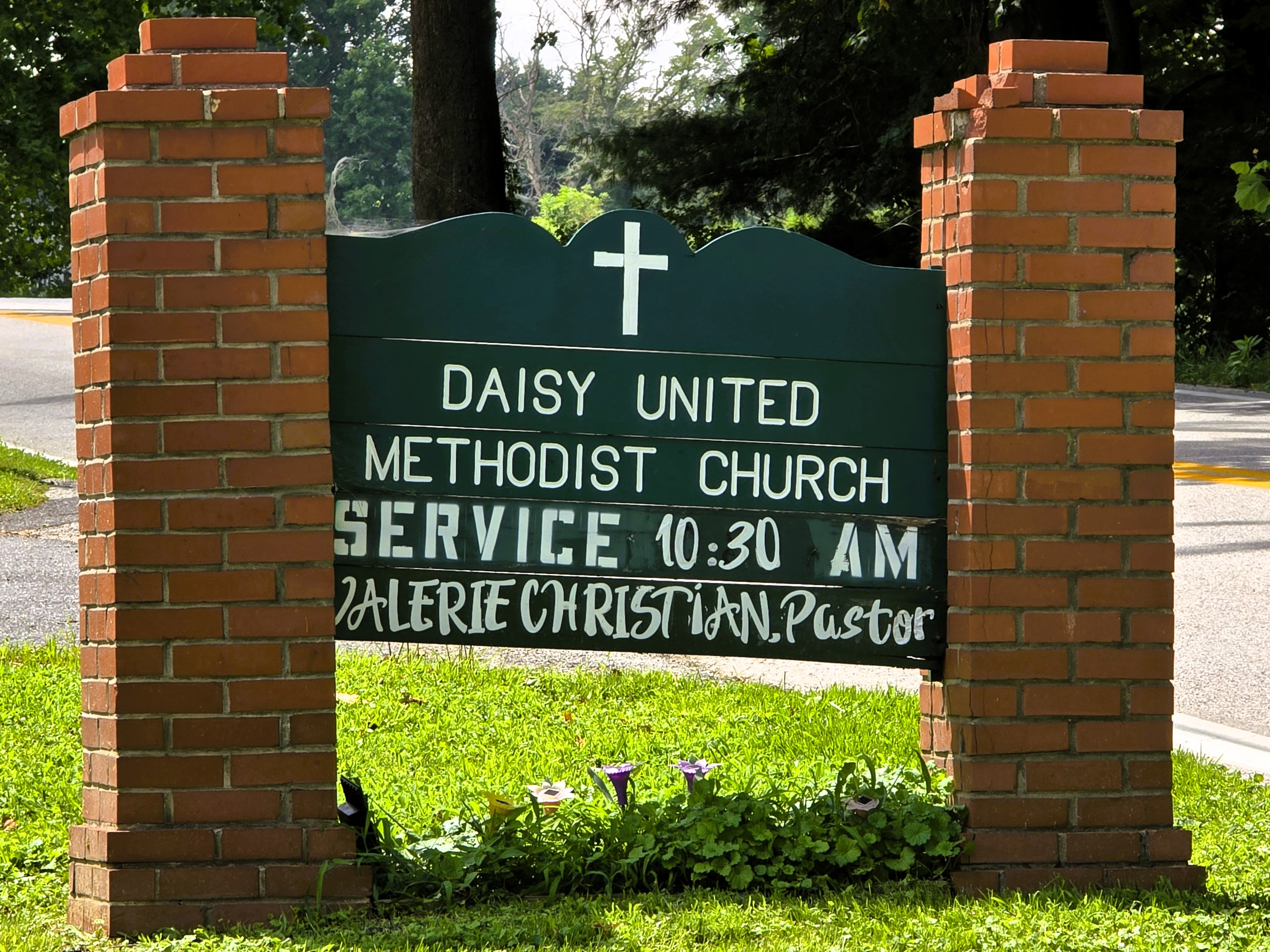
Daisy United Methodist Church sign

== See also ==
- List of Howard County properties in the Maryland Historical Trust
- Asbury Methodist Episcopal Church (Annapolis Junction, Maryland)
- Brown Chapel United Methodist Church
- First Baptist Church of Elkridge
- Hopkins United Methodist Church
- Locust United Methodist Church
- Mt. Moriah Lodge No. 7
- St. Stephens African Methodist Episcopal Church
- St. Luke's African Methodist Episcopal Church
