= Rorabaugh House =

- Location within Maryland
- 39°07′57.7″N 76°47′59.7″W
- Nearest city: Jessup, Maryland

History
- Built: 1854-1863

Site notes
- Area: 10750 Guilford Road, Jessup Maryland
- Architectural style: Romanesque

The Rorabaugh House was a historic Romanesque house located on Guilford Road in Jessup, Maryland.

The structure was built by William P. Cresson in a period after Howard County was split off from Anne Arundel County. Micheal Fitzsimmons purchased the property on October 5, 1863, for $4,600. The two-story, L-shaped wood-framed house sat on property subdivided down to 4.5 acres. The adjoining lots and structures created for the daughters of the heirs were destroyed to create Maryland Route 32.

The house was once owned by William C. Bevan, a politician and member of the Maryland House of Delegates. The house was razed between 1984 and 1988.

== See also ==
Mt. Moriah Lodge No. 7
