= Oak Hill (Jessup, Maryland) =

Historic manor in Maryland, United States

- Location within Maryland
- 39°10′32″N 76°47′16″W
- Location: Jessup, Maryland

Site notes
- Architectural style: Victorian
- Governing body: Private

Oak Hill is a historic manor located at Jessup, Maryland, United States.

Oak Hill is a historic manor on a 235-acre farm between the Dorsey's Branch of the little Patuxent and the Old Annapolis road. The site is now dominated by the I-95 and Route 175 interchange, and the Port Capitol drive housing development, known as "Port Capital Village".

The manor houses were built and maintained by the Orson Adams (1835–1907) family. Adams was the president of the Commercial National Bank of New York, using Oak Hill as a summer home. A Victorian manor house and an English Manor house were built onsite and noted in 1876 Hopkins maps. For a period they operated as antique stores before being purchased by the Rouse Company for land development. Within ten years of ownership by Rouse, both historic structures were omitted from the historic register, and burned down. Oak Hill was one of many historical buildings in the region with valuable real estate that was developed after a fire set to the structure, including Ammendale Normal Institute (1998), Troy Hill (1990), Duvall Farm, Avondale Mill (1991), St. Mary's College (1997), and Henryton State Hospital (2007, 2011).

The Oak Hill youth detention complex in neighboring Anne Arundel County was named after the historic location.

== See also ==
- Spurrier's Tavern
- Savage Mill Historic District
