= Mount Zion United Methodist Church (Ellicott City, Maryland) =

Church in Maryland, United States

- Interactive map of the Mount Zion United Methodist Church area

General information
- Location: Ellicott City, Maryland
- Coordinates: 39.2693°N 76.8059°W
- Completed: 1874

Height
- Roof: Shingle

Mount Zion United Methodist Church was a historic African American Church located at 8537 Main Street in Ellicott City, Maryland.

The building was constructed in 1874.

The church closed in December 2018 due to a decline in the number of members. As of November 2025, the building hosts an Ethiopian Orthodox Tewahedo Church congregation.

== See also ==
- Asbury Methodist Episcopal Church (Annapolis Junction, Maryland)
- Mt. Moriah Lodge No. 7
