= St. Luke African Methodist Episcopal Church =

St. Luke African Methodist Episcopal Church may refer to:

- St. Luke African Methodist Episcopal Church (Lawrence, Kansas)
- St. Luke African Methodist Episcopal Church (Ellicott City, Maryland)
