= Waterloo, Maryland =

Unincorporated community in Maryland, United States

Waterloo, Howard County, Maryland
- Unincorporated area
- Location within Maryland Location within the United States
- Coordinates: 39°10′19″N 76°47′7″W
- Country: United States
- State: Maryland
- County: Howard
- CDP: Jessup
- Settled: 1771
- Founder: Thomas Spurrier
- Named for: Battle of Waterloo

Government
  - Councilman: Calvin Ball, III; District 2
- Time zone: UTC-5 (Eastern)
  - Summer (DST): UTC-4 (EDT)
- ZIP code: 20794, 21075
- Area code: 410, 443, and 667

Waterloo is an unincorporated community located in Howard County in the U.S. state of Maryland. Located at the intersection of Waterloo Road and Washington Boulevard, the neighborhood is encompassed mostly by Jessup and partially by Elkridge.

== History ==
Spurrier's Tavern was a prominent location along the post road from Philadelphia to Georgetown. During the American Revolution, Spurrier's tavern was significant as a supply and resting point for the Continental Army; George Washington was a frequent visitor. It became the central meeting place of the Elk Ridge Militia. The tavern was renamed to "Waterloo" in 1815 by the innkeeper after the Battle of Waterloo. Hence, the area around the tavern followed the name of "Waterloo".

The greater Waterloo area is now referenced as Jessup. The Maryland State Police Waterloo barracks retain the old name of the community.

== Neighborhoods ==
- Cedar Villa Heights, a mid twentieth century neighborhood located off Cedar Avenue.
- Dorset Gardens at Blue Stream, a new townhouse community located adjacent to the U.S. 1 Flea Market.
- Howard Square, a major mixed-use development initiated in 2013 located across from the Waterloo Barracks.
- Lark Brown, a townhouse and commercial community located on Old Waterloo Road and Lark Brown Road.
- Mission Place, an apartment complex on Mission Road and Washington Boulevard
- Montevideo, an established residential community located at the crossroads of Montevideo Road and Forest and Wigley Avenues.
- Ridgely's Run, a small light residential neighborhood with a community center located off of Mission Road.

== Education ==
Currently, no schools exist in the immediate area of Waterloo. The closest schools include Deep Run Elementary School on Old Waterloo Road, Thomas Viaduct Middle School in Oxford Square, Bollman Bridge Elementary School and Patuxent Valley Middle School in Savage.

In 2016, funding has been requested to construct a new high school on the Mission Road Quarry Site, currently owned by Savage Stone. The school would alleviate crowding along the Route 1 Corridor.

== Industry ==
Waterloo includes a number of large industrial centers.

- East Columbia Marketpace
- Maryland Wholesale Food Market
- Maryland Seafood Market
- US 1 Flea Market

== Public transit ==
Waterloo is 1.9 miles (3.1 km) (a four-minute drive) from Jessup station (MARC Camden Line). The area is also served by a number of bus routes that interchange at the Maryland Wholesale Food Market Transportation Hub. They include RTA 408/Gold, 409/Purple, 410/Silver and MTA 320.

== Notable people ==
- Mary Surratt (1823-1865), American boarding house owner convicted as a conspirator in the assassination of Abraham Lincoln and sentenced to death
