= Mount Airy, Maryland =

- Town
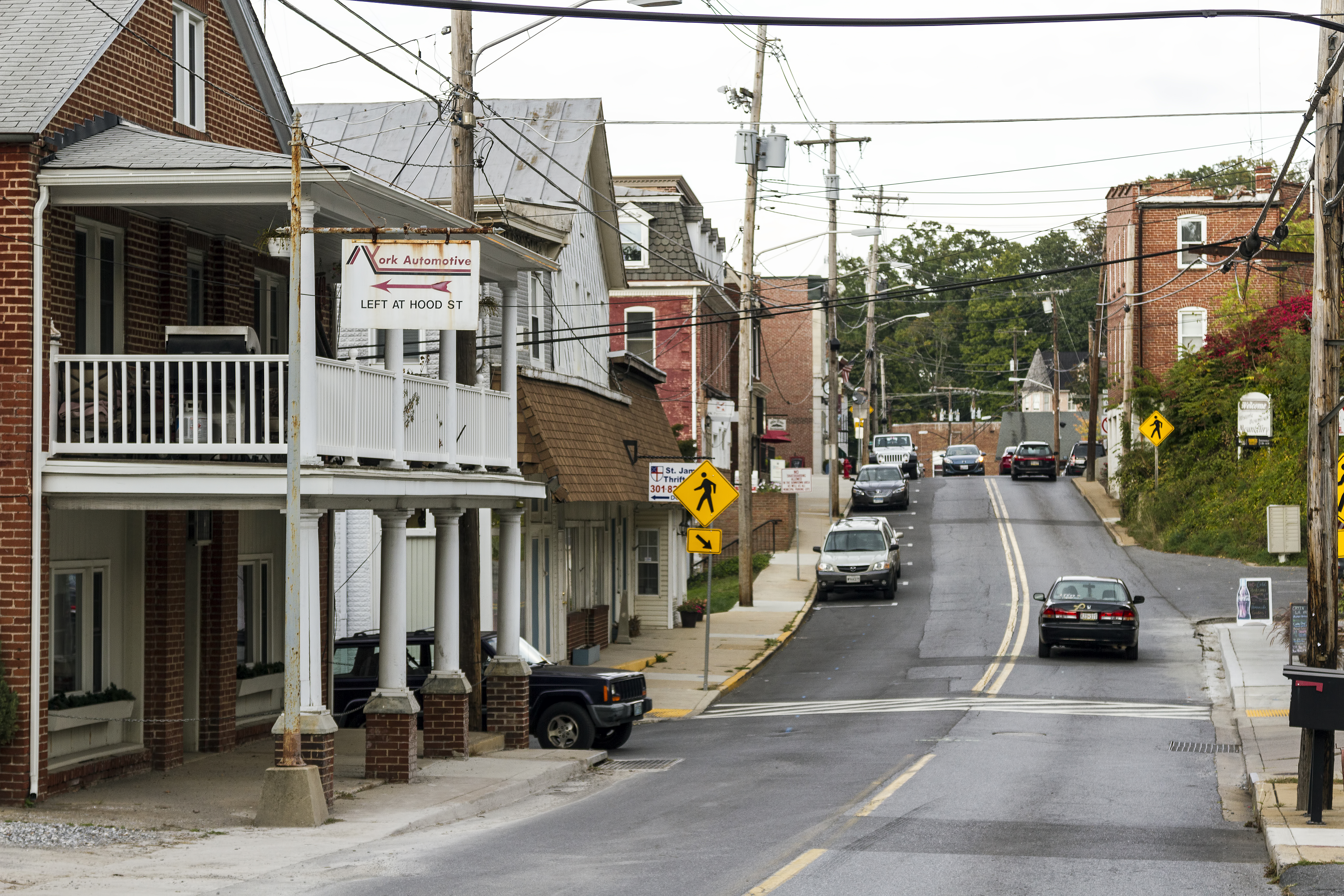
- Main Street in Mt. Airy

- Flag Seal Logo

- Location in Carroll County

- Location in Frederick County
- Coordinates: 39°22′29″N 77°9′20″W
- Country: United States of America
- State: Maryland
- Counties: Frederick, Carroll
- Settled: 1830
- Incorporation: 1894

Government
  - Type: Mayor-Council

Area
  - Total: 4.14 sq mi (10.71 km^{2})
  - Land: 4.12 sq mi (10.68 km^{2})
  - Water: 0.012 sq mi (0.03 km^{2})
- Elevation: 764 ft (233 m)

Population (2020)
  - Total: 9,654
  - Density: 2,343.2/sq mi (904.7/km^{2})
- Time zone: UTC-5 (Eastern (EST))
  - Summer (DST): UTC-4 (EDT)
- ZIP code: 21771
- Area codes: 301, 240
- FIPS code: 24-53875
- GNIS feature ID: 2391316
- Website: www.mountairymd.gov

Mount Airy is a town in Carroll and Frederick counties in the U.S. state of Maryland. It is part of both the Washington Metropolitan Area and Baltimore Metropolitan Area. As of the 2020 census, the population was 9,654.

== History ==
The community was first settled in 1830 and continued to develop throughout the decade, beginning with the construction of house settlements along Parr's Ridge. A man named Henry Bussard built the first of these houses. This town was known for its train station on the Baltimore and Ohio Railroad (B&O) at Parr's Ridge. The railroad ran from Baltimore to Frederick, cities to the east and west, respectively, of Mt. Airy. Following 1830, the town received its official name after the suggestion of "Mount Airy" from an Irish B&O worker who complained about his freezing ears on a windy work day. Over the years, milling, canning and sewing industries initially helped support Mt. Airy's economy.

The town's proximity to the National Road contributed to its growth. The National Road ran west from Baltimore to Illinois. By the 1890s, the town's growth had increased significantly and three new churches were built (one Episcopal and two Methodist, among which the Simpson-Poplar Springs African Methodist Episcopal Church). In 1901, a very important bridge was constructed. It's known by residents as the Twin Arch, and it helped with railroad transportation. Three great fires (1903, 1914, and 1925) caused setbacks in growth, but the town rebuilt every time.

When Carroll County defined its permanent boundaries in 1837, Mount Airy was divided between two counties, Carroll and Frederick; the town has remained in two counties since that time. About one mile south of the town is the junction of Carroll, Frederick, Howard and Montgomery counties at the source of the South Branch of the Patapsco River.

The town was originally settled in the early 1830s by a core group of six families. Dorsey, Davis and Bussard were the most prominent names in that first settlement, which was followed closely by the construction of the B & O railroad line in 1831. Because Mount Airy sits at an elevation of 830 feet (250 m), a series of four inclined planes were constructed in order for the trains to climb the steep hills. Locomotives and cars were lifted with the assistance of horses and steam winches. Passengers had to disembark during this process. Plane #4, located west of the town at the intersection of Woodville Road and MD Route 144, is still a recognized location today. In 1839 the planes were abandoned, and the new line was constructed north of where Mount Airy is today. This was a result of more powerful locomotives that had been constructed and heavier loads were being hauled. In 1901, a railroad tunnel was constructed on the south side of town and the existing line into town became a spur line into the center of Mount Airy. The town named the first resident, Henry Bussard, the station agent for the new train station. Mr. Bussard was the first major landowner in Mount Airy.

By 1846, the town was sparsely settled with several houses, a store, barber shop and shoemaker shop. Pine Grove Chapel, circa 1846, now a historic monument, was constructed to fill the need for a community church. From the time it was constructed, the chapel basement functioned as a private school. The chapel remained open during the early part of the Civil War despite soldier encampments in proximity. The school and church were closed later because of distracting soldier activity around the vicinity of the school. After the war ended, the church reopened in 1867 after undergoing a renovation.

In 1893, the Carroll County Board of Education funded the construction of a three-room schoolhouse which was completed in September 1894. The building, approximately 1,700 square feet (160 m^{2}) in size, was located on the east side of Main Street, 1/4 mile south of the railroad tracks. It is now part of the Calvary United Methodist Church property.

With the incorporation of the town in 1894 came the establishment of the town government structure, including a mayor and council. The first Mount Airy mayor was Byron S. Dorsey, who served ten years in that office between 1894 and 1904. In 1900, the town population had grown to 332 residents. By 1910, the town population was 428, and it was determined that the town had enough student population to justify a state-accredited high school. A high school with classes was organized, but an official high school building to house all eleven grades was not constructed at that time.

The town of Mount Airy endured three disastrous fires during the first quarter of the 20th century. The first fire occurred in 1902 and destroyed the business section of the southern side of the downtown area. The second fire was in 1914 and consumed the north side of the downtown business section. The third fire took place about ten years later, in 1925, and again, the northern side of the downtown business district was destroyed. As a result of the 1925 fire, the Mount Airy Volunteer Fire Company was organized in 1926.

During the late 1920s and early 1930s the town continued to flourish despite the onset of the Great Depression. The 1930 U.S. Census tallied the town population at 845 persons, an increase of 91 people since 1920. The railroad company largely contributed to the growth of not only the population, but the town's economy as well. As a result, expanded town services included necessary public utilities such as electric service when Potomac Edison was established in Mount Airy. The thriving economy supported the initiation of several large businesses in the 1930s, such as a poultry operation, two automobile garages, an ice factory, and the creation of the Mount Airy Canning Company, which provided about 250 jobs. In 1932, the first motion picture theater opened in Mount Airy, establishing a core business district. During that time, the town also saw the purchase of land for a town park, the opening of a grocery store and a lumberyard, and the dedication of Pine Grove Chapel for use as a nonsectarian chapel. In 1935 a Southern States Cooperative was established in the town, which survived for 91 years, until 2026.

The Mount Airy Historic District that includes the railroad station was added to the National Register of Historic Places in 1984.

Currently, Mt. Airy is no longer economically dependent on the railroad, as citizens work a variety of different jobs. Many of its citizens work in Washington, DC, or Baltimore; the city is a part of both of those cities' metropolitan areas. Mt. Airy is a neighborhood community for these job centers. Mt. Airy is similar to back in the day with the National Road but now with Interstate 70 bordering the southern end of the city with an interchange with MD-27. In the last few decades Mount Airy has seen significant growth, as laid out in the Mount Airy Master Plan from the 1994 to 2003 update. In 2007, President George W. Bush made a speech in Mount Airy.

Mt. Airy hosts townwide events each year including the Main Street Chili Cookoff, Celebrate Mount Airy in August, Mount Airy Oktoberfest in September, Shop Small and A Main Street Christmas in December.

== Geography ==
Mount Airy is located on the border between Frederick and Carroll counties, in the far eastern part of Frederick County and the southwest corner of Carroll County. Mount Airy's Main Street, formerly MD 27 and now Maryland Route 808, runs atop Parrs Ridge in a northeast–southwest direction with elevations ranging between 800 and 850 feet (240 and 260 m). Numerous valleys that extend outward toward the east and west from this ridge give the town its unusually hilly topography. Mount Airy straddles the division of two major drainage basins. Within the Frederick County portion of the town are the headwaters of Woodville Branch and Ben's Branch which are parts of the Linganore Creek watershed, as well as the headwaters of Bush Creek in the southwestern part of the town. The Linganore watershed drains into Lake Linganore, a secondary source of public water for Frederick County. The Linganore and Bush Creek watersheds are part of the Lower Monocacy River watershed, with eventual drainage to the Potomac River. The east side of Mount Airy drains via tributaries of Middle Run and the South Branch of the Patapsco River to Baltimore Harbor. Both the Potomac and the Patapsco are part of the Chesapeake Bay watershed.

According to the U.S. Census Bureau, the town of Mount Airy has a total area of 4.13 square miles (10.70 km^{2}), of which 4.12 square miles (10.67 km^{2}) is land and 0.01 square miles (0.03 km^{2}), or 0.29%, is water.

=== Transportation ===
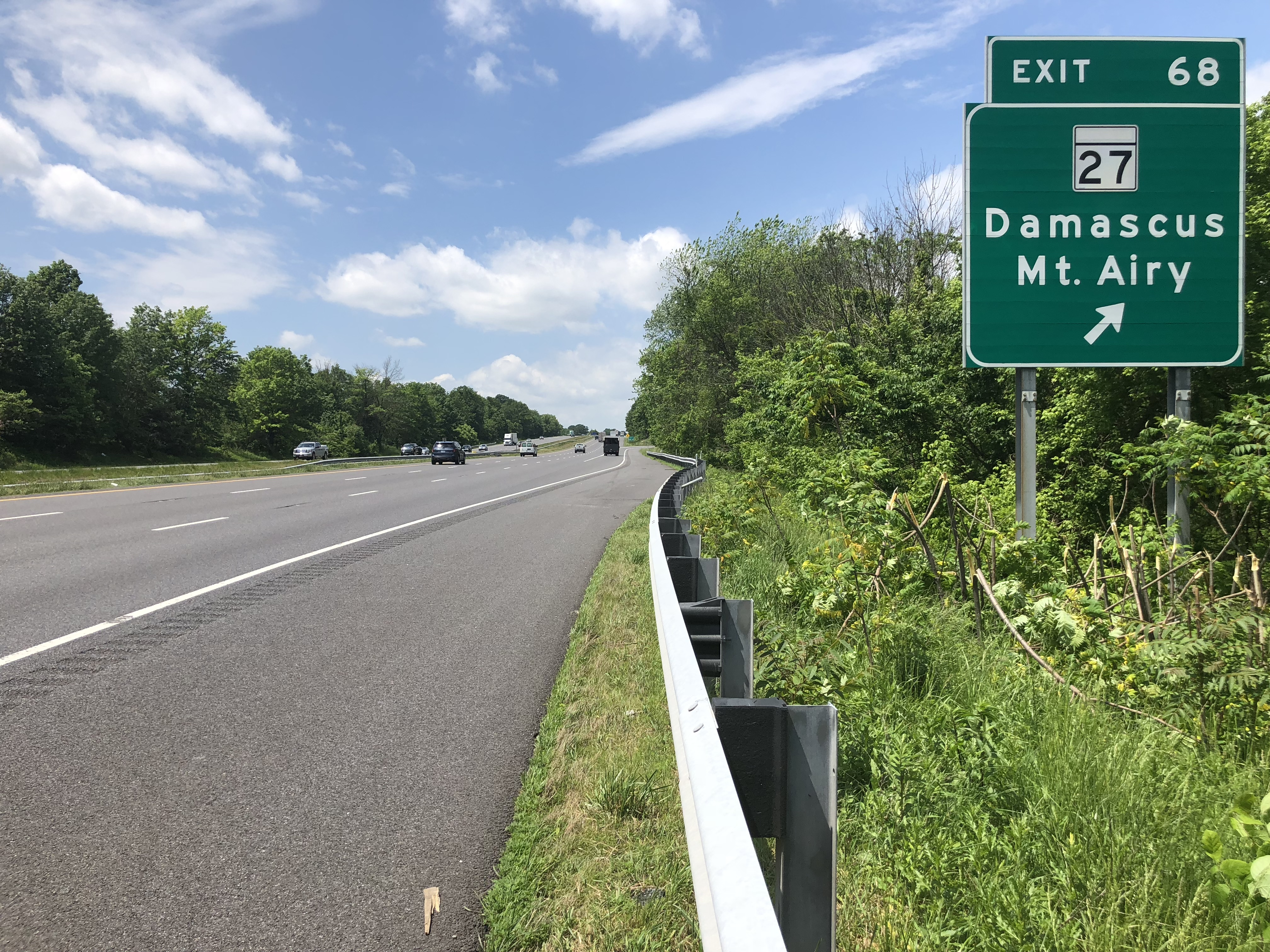
The exit for Mount Airy along I-70/US 40

The primary means of travel to and from Mount Airy are by road. The most prominent highway serving the town is Interstate 70 and U.S. Route 40, which forms the southern border of Mount Airy and leads east 32 miles (51 km) to Baltimore and west 14 miles (23 km) to Frederick. Maryland Route 27 (Ridge Road) runs through the east side of the town, leading northeast 16 miles (26 km) to Westminster, the Carroll County seat, and southwest 14 miles (23 km) to Interstate 270 in Germantown. Maryland Route 808 follows the original route of Maryland Route 27 through downtown Mount Airy.

=== Climate ===
Mount Airy is similar to Westminster in its position astride Parrs Ridge, and has a humid, temperate climate, more specifically a humid subtropical climate falling short of a humid continental climate, with four rather well defined seasons. The general atmospheric flow is from west to east but alternate surges of cold air from the north and of warm humid air from the south occurs in the area, causing highly variable weather. Nearness to the Atlantic Coast allows coastal storms to make up any deficiency of precipitation resulting from the passage of weather systems over the mountains to the west.

The average annual temperature is approximately 54 degrees, with January generally the coldest month and July the warmest. Temperatures exceed 90 degrees Fahrenheit an average of 27 days a year. The Town of Mount Airy is in the USDA Plant Hardiness Zone 7a for an annual extreme minimum temperature of 0-5 degrees Fahrenheit.

The average annual precipitation totals about 45 inches, with February the driest and August the wettest month. During the growing season, which averages about 177 days from April through to September, the last part of July through to the first part of August is the driest, with an average of 85-90 degrees. The average seasonal snowfall in Mount Airy per year is 28 inches, which is equal to the U.S. national average.

Climate data for Mount Airy, Maryland
Month	Jan	Feb	Mar	Apr	May	Jun	Jul	Aug	Sep	Oct	Nov	Dec	Year
Record high °F (°C)	77 (25)	79 (26)	85 (29)	93 (34)	96 (36)	100 (38)	103 (39)	103 (39)	103 (39)	92 (33)	83 (28)	78 (26)	103 (39)
Mean daily maximum °F (°C)	40 (4)	44 (7)	54 (12)	65 (18)	74 (23)	83 (28)	87 (31)	85 (29)	78 (26)	67 (19)	55 (13)	44 (7)	64.7 (18.2)
Mean daily minimum °F (°C)	20 (−7)	22 (−6)	30 (−1)	38 (3)	48 (9)	57 (14)	62 (17)	60 (16)	53 (12)	41 (5)	32 (0)	25 (−4)	40.7 (4.8)
Record low °F (°C)	−22 (−30)	−20 (−29)	−9 (−23)	15 (−9)	25 (−4)	33 (1)	39 (4)	35 (2)	26 (−3)	14 (−10)	5 (−15)	−12 (−24)	−22 (−30)
Average precipitation inches (mm)	3.37 (86)	2.62 (67)	3.63 (92)	3.38 (86)	4.16 (106)	4.31 (109)	3.53 (90)	3.22 (82)	3.87 (98)	3.49 (89)	3.63 (92)	3.19 (81)	42.40 (1,077)
Average snowfall inches (cm)	9.8 (25)	10.1 (26)	3.2 (8.1)	.2 (0.51)	0 (0)	0 (0)	0 (0)	0 (0)	0 (0)	.1 (0.25)	.9 (2.3)	3.7 (9.4)	28.0 (71)
Source: The Weather Channel

== Demographics ==
Historical population
Census	Pop.	Note	%±
1880	91		—
1900	332		—
1910	428		28.9%
1920	754		76.2%
1930	860		14.1%
1940	791		−8.0%
1950	1,061		34.1%
1960	1,352		27.4%
1970	1,825		35.0%
1980	2,450		34.2%
1990	3,730		52.2%
2000	6,425		72.3%
2010	9,288		44.6%
2020	9,654		3.9%
U.S. Decennial Census

=== 2020 census ===
As of the 2020 census, Mount Airy had a population of 9,654. The median age was 38.7 years. 25.6% of residents were under the age of 18 and 12.3% of residents were 65 years of age or older. For every 100 females there were 96.2 males, and for every 100 females age 18 and over there were 94.2 males age 18 and over.

100.0% of residents lived in urban areas, while 0.0% lived in rural areas.

There were 3,379 households in Mount Airy, of which 41.9% had children under the age of 18 living in them. Of all households, 62.4% were married-couple households, 12.1% were households with a male householder and no spouse or partner present, and 20.3% were households with a female householder and no spouse or partner present. About 19.5% of all households were made up of individuals and 10.2% had someone living alone who was 65 years of age or older.

There were 3,489 housing units, of which 3.2% were vacant. The homeowner vacancy rate was 0.9% and the rental vacancy rate was 6.7%.

Racial composition as of the 2020 census
Race	Number	Percent
White	8,145	84.4%
Black or African American	263	2.7%
American Indian and Alaska Native	27	0.3%
Asian	227	2.4%
Native Hawaiian and Other Pacific Islander	3	0.0%
Some other race	226	2.3%
Two or more races	763	7.9%
Hispanic or Latino (of any race)	655	6.8%

=== 2010 census ===
As of the census of 2010, there were 9,288 people, 3,107 households, and 2,453 families residing in the city. The population density was 2,254.4 inhabitants per square mile (870.4/km^{2}). There were 3,225 housing units at an average density of 782.8 per square mile (302.2/km^{2}). The racial makeup of the town was 92.1% White, 2.4% African American, 0.2% Native American, 2.2% Asian, 0.9% from other races, and 2.1% from two or more races. Hispanic or Latino of any race were 4.7% of the population.

There were 3,107 households, of which 50.1% had children under the age of 18 living with them, 65.2% were married couples living together, 9.3% had a female householder with no husband present, 4.4% had a male householder with no wife present, and 21.0% were non-families. 16.7% of all households were made up of individuals, and 7.7% had someone living alone who was 65 years of age or older. The average household size was 2.97 and the average family size was 3.36.

The median age in the city was 36.1 years. 32% of residents were under the age of 18; 6.1% were between the ages of 18 and 24; 28.2% were from 25 to 44; 25.4% were from 45 to 64; and 8.3% were 65 years of age or older. The gender makeup of the town was 48.5% male and 51.5% female.

=== 2000 census ===
As of the census of 2000, there were 6,425 people, 2,123 households, and 1,717 families residing in the city. The population density was 1,678.5 inhabitants per square mile (648.1/km^{2}). There were 2,179 housing units at an average density of 569.3 per square mile (219.8/km^{2}). The racial makeup of the town was 94.71% White, 2.58% African American, 0.23% Native American, 0.87% Asian, 0.25% from other races, and 1.35% from two or more races. Hispanic or Latino of any race were 1.34% of the population. 24% of Mount Airy's residents were German, 19% Irish, 12% English, 7% Italian, 4% Scottish, 3% French, 3% Black or African-American, 2% Dutch, 2% Polish and 2% Welsh. People of Scotch-Irish, British, Ukrainian, Yugoslavian, Russian, French-Canadian, Czech, Swedish and Norwegian descent each comprised 1% of the population.

There were 2,123 households, out of which 51.4% had children under the age of 18 living with them, 69.0% were married couples living together, 8.5% had a female householder with no husband present, and 19.1% were non-families. 14.9% of all households were made up of individuals, and 5.2% had someone living alone who was 65 years of age or older. The average household size was 3.02 and the average family size was 3.37.

In the city the population was spread out, with 34.4% under the age of 18, 5.4% from 18 to 24, 37.1% from 25 to 44, 16.9% from 45 to 64, and 6.2% who were 65 years of age or older. The median age was 33 years. For every 100 females there were 98.5 males. For every 100 females age 18 and over, there were 93.2 males.

The median income for a household in the city was $66,967, and the median income for a family was $76,214. Males had a median income of $52,177 versus $35,054 for females. The per capita income for the city was $25,380. About 2.0% of families and 3.3% of the population were below the poverty line, including 4.4% of those under age 18 and 1.8% of those age 65 or over.

== Education ==
The portion in Carroll County is in the Carroll County Public Schools school district. The Carroll County portion of Mount Airy is home to two elementary schools and one middle school. The first, Mount Airy Elementary, was built and occupied in 1935. In the mid-1980s, the school received major renovations both inside and out. The school has a natural-gas-fired heating system, school-wide air conditioning, and Internet access from the classrooms and computer lab. Parr's Ridge Elementary School was built in 2005 due to serious overcrowding at Mount Airy Elementary. Parr's Ridge enrolls students from kindergarten through Grade 2, while Mount Airy Elementary School enrolls students in grades 3–5. Mount Airy Elementary is located next to Mount Airy Middle, which is located next to Parr's Ridge Elementary. Mount Airy Middle School was originally constructed in 1958 and served as a high school until 1965 (when South Carroll High School was completed), then served as a middle school until 2013. Construction began on a new middle school in June 2011 and was opened for the school year starting in the fall of 2013. The old middle school building was demolished in the same year. Students in grades 9 through 12 in the Carroll County portion attend South Carroll High School 10 miles (16 km) northeast of town.

The portion in Frederick County is in the Frederick County Public Schools school district. Accordingly, students in that county go to schools in that school district instead of the Carroll County school district. School zoning for Frederick County areas is as follows: Twin Ridge Elementary School, Windsor Knolls Middle School, and Linganore High School. Twin Ridge Elementary School is located on the western edge of Mount Airy. Linganore High is 7 miles (11 km) west of town.

Mount Airy is also home to a private school, Mount Airy Christian Academy, which offers pre-school - 12th grade education.

== Notable people ==
- Joe Alexander (born 1986), American-Israeli professional basketball player for Maccabi Tel Aviv
- Josh Boone (born 1984), NBA player
- Phil Breno (born 1995), soccer player
- John M. Gaver Sr. (1900–1982), thoroughbred trainer in Racing Hall of Fame
- Rob Havenstein (born 1992), NFL player
