= Guilford Road =

Historic road in Maryland

- Interactive map of Guilford Road
- Location: Jessup, Maryland, Savage, Maryland, Columbia, Maryland, Clarksville, Maryland
- Postal code: 20701, 20794, 20759, 21029, 21046

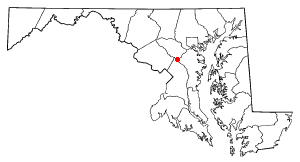

Guilford Road is a historic road north of Savage, Maryland that traverses Anne Arundel and Howard Counties in an area that was first settled by English colonists in the mid-1600s. Today's Guilford road is a series of disconnected segments bisected multiple times by the construction of Maryland Route 32.

The Christ Church Guilford was built along the road in 1701, tended by Reverend McGill who built Athol Manor along the road in 1740. Oak Hall was built by Richard Dorsey on the road near Christ Church in 1809 as a companion to the 1706 Waveland house built by Larkin Dorsey on the "New Year's Gift" tract. In 1860, the Mt. Moriah Lodge No. 7 was built along the road.

== Origins ==
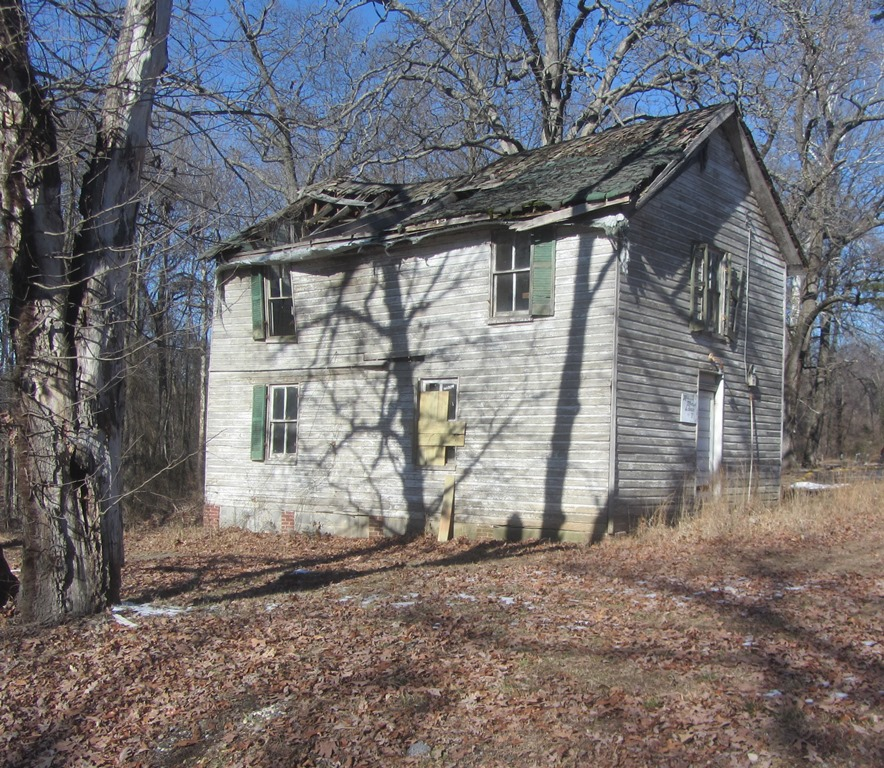
Mount Mariah Lodge

Simon Martenet's 1860 map of Howard County shows the road in great detail. The road was built Westward from Annapolis Junction, Maryland to Magnolia, to Guilford, Maryland across the Columbia Turnpike to Simpsonville, Maryland to Clarksville, Maryland where it merges with Old Annapolis Road to form the "Rolling Road". In 1887 funds were provided to build a bridge over the Little Patuxent River. In 1891, Howard County turned the path into a widened public road from Guilford to the post Road (U.S. Route 1).

== History ==
The quarry and milling town of Guilford, Maryland share the name with the road. shortly after the Howard District of Anne Arundel County was formed, Free African Americans in the slave state gathered around the crossroads of Guilford and the Postal road (U.S. Route 1) to form Asbury Methodist Church. In 1974, Howard County planners considered the Guilford Community of 700 black residents, not dense enough, proposing subsidized housing for the neighborhood. In 1975, Ellsworth Iager attempted to dissolve the residential component of the black community along the road for commercial development.

== Route (East to West) ==
Intersection	Location	Notes
National Business Parkway	39°07′22.6″N 076°47′05″W	Beginning of the modern Guilford Road at the National Business Parkway traffic circle.
Brock Bridge Road	39°07′31.6″N 076°47′20.7″W	Brock Bridge Road – Cut off to the South by Route 32
Hilder Avenue	39°07′41.3″N 076°47′28.3″W	
Pumphouse Road	39°07′43.1″N 076°47′28.3″W	

== See also ==
- Rorabaugh House
