= Mount Airy Historic District (Mount Airy, Maryland) =

Historic district in Maryland, United States

- U.S. National Register of Historic Places
- U.S. Historic district
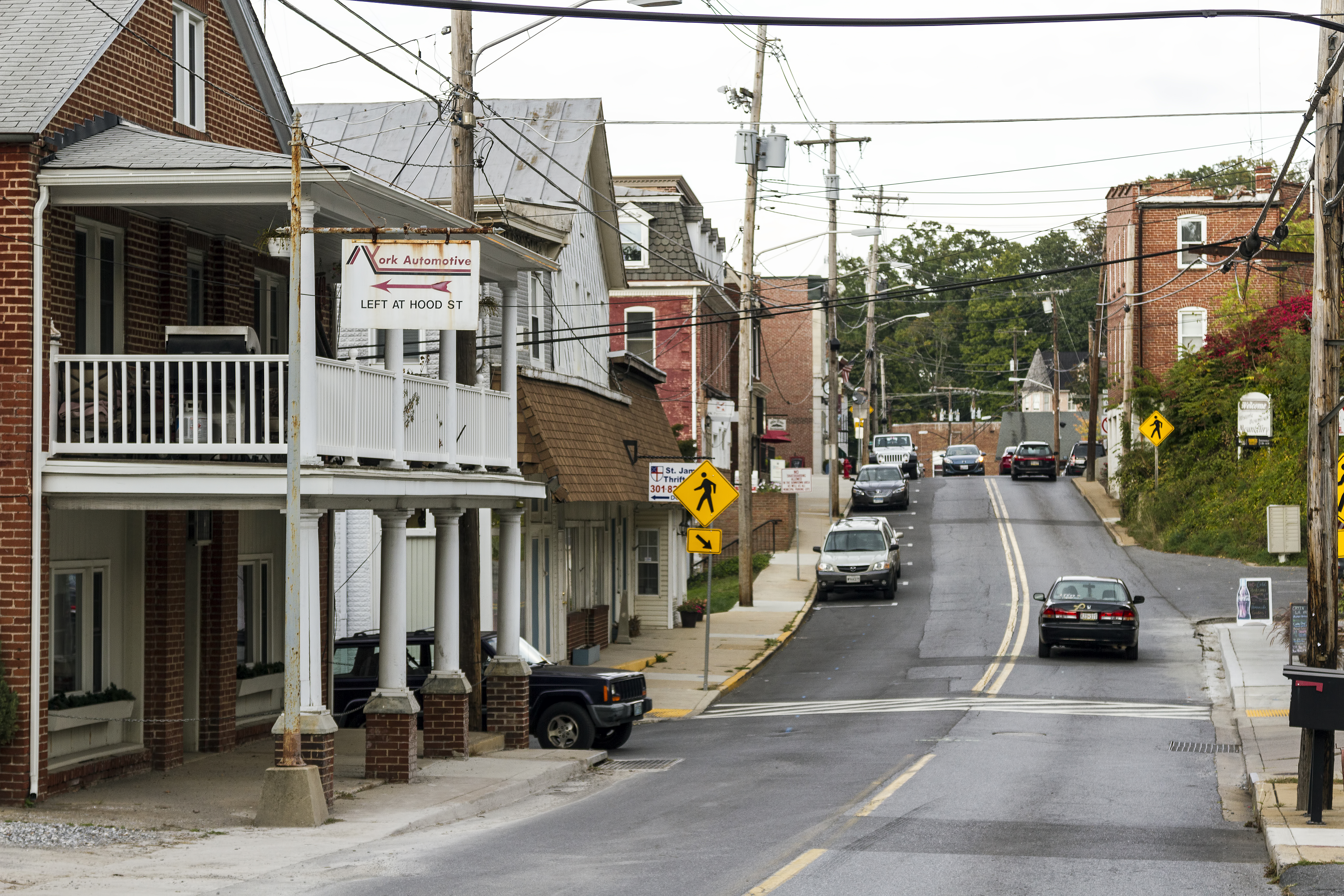
- Main Street

- Location within Maryland Location within the United States
- Location: Roughly Main, Church, Maple, Park, Hill, and Warfield Sts., Mount Airy, Maryland
- Coordinates: 39°22′31″N 77°9′21″W
- Area: 102 acres (41 ha)
- Built: 1838
- Architectural style: Late 19th And 20th Century Revivals, Late Victorian, Bungalow
- NRHP reference No.: 84001589
- Added to NRHP: September 13, 1984

The Mount Airy Historic District is a national historic district in Mount Airy, located in Carroll and Frederick County, Maryland. The district comprises a cohesive group of commercial, residential, and ecclesiastical buildings dating from the late 19th through early 20th centuries. The brick Baltimore and Ohio Railroad station, designed by E. Francis Baldwin and constructed in 1882, represents the town's origin as an early transportation center for the region, which dates back as early as 1838. A group of early-20th century commercial structures represent the rebuilding of Mount Airy's downtown after a series of fires between 1903 and 1926. The residential areas are characterized by houses illustrating vernacular forms and popular stylistic influences of the late 19th and early 20th century. Three churches are located within the district.

It was added to the National Register of Historic Places in 1984.
