= Spurrier's Tavern =

Former tavern in central Maryland, U.S.

- Location within Maryland
- 39°10′19.5″N 76°47′11.5″W
- Nearest city: Jessup, Maryland

History
- Built: 1771
- Demolished: after 1852

Spurrier's Tavern was a well-known tavern and horse-changing depot which stood by the main road between Baltimore and Washington, D.C. (now U.S. Route 1) from 1771 to 1835 near what is now Jessup, Maryland. George Washington visited the tavern several times during his presidency. After an 1835 fire, the building was repaired for residence by the family of its owner, who died there in 1852. It was demolished sometime thereafter.

== 1700s ==
William Spurrier was from what is now western Howard County where his father Thomas Spurrier owned two properties, Spurrier's Lot and Grime's Venture. Thomas Spurrier sold Spurrier's Lot and Grimes Venture to his sons Joseph and Richard in 1788. About 1760, William Spurrier married Ann Brown. By a will dated March 18, 1755, Ann Brown had inherited 300 acres (120 ha) from her father. The land was a part of a tract known as Brown's Purchase. On the Brown's Purchase tract, at the junction of the north–south and east–west roads, was William and Ann Spurrier's dwelling. In August 1771, Spurrier was given a license to keep an inn or ordinary.

In 1783, William Spurrier was compensated 13 pounds by the government. Elements of the French Army, on the way back from the victory over the British at Yorktown in 1781, camped near the tavern. Spurrier probably provided lodging and/or food and beverages to some of the French officers. In the 1780s, Spurrier had financial problems and in June 1788, to protect his assets, conveyed much of his personal property, including Brown's Purchase and the tavern to his son John. In November 1788, William went bankrupt.

In the 1790s, George Washington, while President, frequently made the journey from Mt. Vernon to the seat of government, at the time in Philadelphia. Washington avoided public houses where possible, he preferred staying in private homes. He sometimes stayed at a public house. According to his diary Washington stopped at Spurrier's a number of times.

Thomas Twining, a British passenger on a stage coach trip from Baltimore to Georgetown in April 1796, described Spurrier's as a "solitary inn" at which they "found the usual substantial American breakfast".

== 1800s ==
William Spurrier died in January 1801. John Spurrier died in 1810. The Maryland Chancery Court ordered the tavern property and other lands to be sold to settle John Spurrier's estate. Rosalie Stier Calvert bought the tavern and land with her father's money at public auction in June 1811 for $20,000.

The Stiers were a Belgian aristocratic family that came to the United States as refugees from the European wars of the 1790s. For a time, the Stiers lived at the William Paca House in Annapolis before building Riversdale House in Prince George's County. Rosalie Stier married George Calvert in 1799. Circumstances forced her Stier relations to return to Belgium and Rosalie Calvert's father left Riversdale to her along with funds to invest for her children. The Spurrier's tavern property was earmarked for Rosalie's oldest child, Caroline.

The Spurrier family had leased the property to Henry McCoy on a seven-year lease before putting the property up for auction. As the lease holder, McCoy had naming rights. The tavern was known as McCoy's until 1818. In 1814, McCoy became postmaster of McCoy's post office, the first post office along the north–south road in what is now Howard County. The post office was closed in 1815 and reopened in the tavern in 1819 as Waterloo, remaining open until 1836.

George Calvert became the president of the new Baltimore – Washington Turnpike Company, charted in 1812. In constructing the new turnpike, the road was rerouted further west, just south of the tavern so as not to distance it from passing traffic. Rosalie Calvert also bought 505 acres (204 ha) of land along the north–south road, in part to prevent anyone from building a tavern in competition with hers.

With the development of Washington City as the federal capital, stage coach traffic on the Baltimore-Washington road was growing. In October 1816, Rosalie Calvert wrote to her father, living in Belgium, a status report on the prospering tavern. Business was so good Rosalie had planned to build a new brick stable, two houses for the coachmen's families and a cook house to replace an old rotten one. She also planned stabling for an additional 40 horses. The lease holder also had the obligation to provide oats for the horses. There were a few hundred acres available to grow the oats.

In 1818, Henry McCoy's lease expired and Rosalie Calvert selected Jeremiah Merrill as the next lease holder. On various contemporary maps, the tavern was labeled Waterloo, Merrill's Wateroo and Merrill's. Calvert and her family were pro-English and considered the British to be the saviors of their home country, Belgium. The family estates were near the site of the Battle of Waterloo. Calvert named the tavern Waterloo. She named another property she bought with her father's money Waterloo as well. Rosalie Calvert died in 1821. An 1827 lithograph by T.M. Baynes shows the inn as a tall two-story 3-bay wide structure with front porch, lantern, and sign servicing stagecoaches. It had individual rooms and hot baths for travelers.

=== Decline and later ownership ===
The B&O Railroad was constructing the Thomas Viaduct across the Patapsco River near Elk Ridge Landing as part of the railroad's route to Washington City. By 1834, the viaduct was nearing completion, and the railroad was laying the railroad tracks to Washington. One operation was just east of the Waterloo Tavern where crews were cutting a pass through a hill, called Jessup's Cut. In late 1834, the railroad crews rioted and the violence spread west to the tavern. Several outbuildings were damaged. The local Maryland militia was called out to restore order. By the late spring of 1835, construction was complete, the tracks had all been laid and the B&O company started running trains to Washington. The B&O Washington line spelled doom for the stage companies operating along the Baltimore-Washington Turnpike. Conveniently, there was a fire at the tavern during July 1835. Just as conveniently, contemporary newspaper accounts of the fire related that a stage coach had stopped during the fire and the passengers were available to help evacuate Merrill's property from the tavern. The fire enabled Merrill to get out of his lease.

The tavern, though not destroyed, was no longer a viable business enterprise. In January 1836, George Calvert dumped the Waterloo property on his daughter. The property was transferred to Caroline Calvert Morris with her brother George Henry Calvert designated as trustee, thus leaving Caroline's husband with no control over the property.

Caroline Calvert had married Thomas W. Morris in 1823. In the late 1830s, the family lived at the Waterloo property during warmer weather while Thomas Morris was effecting repairs to make the old tavern building suitable as a year-round residence. The Morris family was living full-time at Waterloo by 1839. By the early 1840s, Thomas Morris had changed the name of the property to Glenthorne. The name did not stick and the property was known as Waterloo in the land records after Thomas Morris died.

Caroline died in 1842. Her father had died in 1838 and left his entire estate to his two sons. Thomas Morris made efforts to determine which of the Calvert properties were actually a part of George Calvert's estate and which belonged to Rosalie's father's (Henri Stier's) estate, to try determine if his wife, Caroline, had an interest in any other properties that were not part of her father's estate. Ultimately, through a lawsuit, in 1846, Thomas Morris was able to obtain an additional $11,000+ for the devalued state of the tavern property but little else from George Calvert's estate.

Thomas Morris died at the property in 1852. After their uncle George H. Calvert transferred control of the Waterloo properties to the four surviving children of Caroline and Thomas Morris, they sold the properties in three transactions in 1852 and 1853. By 1852, the holdings were 400 acres (160 ha) in four parcels, Brown's Purchase, Second Discovery, the Anvil, and a second segment of Brown's Purchase. All but the Anvil, including Waterloo Farm, were sold to David P. Hayes, who continued to own some of the property as late as 1891.

== 1900s ==
In 1917, the state of Maryland bought parts of two former farms adjoining the Baltimore and Washington boulevard at Waterloo, totaling 530 acres (210 ha), for the use of the Maryland House of Correction. Referred to as Shamrock farm and Waterloo farm, both were described favorably by the Maryland State College of Agriculture (renamed a few years later as the University of Maryland). According to a 1980 inventory of the Maryland House of Correction by the Maryland Historical Trust, "farming was discontinued during the 1960s and lands were sold off to the Maryland State Police, the Patuxent Institution, the Maryland Correctional Institution for Women and the Correctional Camp Center, and the Maryland Wholesale Produce Market complex on the southeast corner of Route 1 and Route 175."

== Present ==
The former location of Spurrier's Tavern is now the major intersection of U.S. 1 and Maryland Route 175 in Jessup, Maryland. A Holiday Inn now occupies the site, which bears Maryland historical markers. At least three such markers have been posted along these roads. The text of the markers has changed slightly over the years, adding some detail and removing notice of its being the place where George Washington's horse died. Washington mentioned Spurrier's several times in his diary entries.

=== Historical marker text ===
U.S. 1 northbound, north of MD 175
Spurrier's Tavern 'Waterloo' – In 1771 William Spurrier opened a tavern at the intersection of the main routes linking Baltimore, Washington and Annapolis. Now US 1 and MD 175. As Traffic increased it served as the first horse changing station for stages southbound from Baltimore; by 1811 the stables offered lodging for 80 horses. After 1815 owner Rosalie Siers Calvert of Riversdale, a Belgian native, renamed the tavern 'Waterloo' to celebrate Napoleons defeat. In 1835 A fire and competition from the new railroad put an end to the tavern. But the local area is still known by the name. – Maryland Historical Trust, Maryland State Highway Administration (photo)

Spurrier's Tavern – Thomas Spurrier's stood at nearby crossroads connecting two important overland routes in colonial days (now U.S. 1 and MD. 175.) George Washington stopped here at least 25 times between 1789 and 1798. His diary noted July 18, 1795: "Dined and lodged at Spurrier's where my sick horse died." Waterloo Inn later occupied the site, but this "popular resort" did not survive into the 20th century. – Maryland Bicentennial Commission, Maryland Historical Society (reported missing and replaced)

MD 175 eastbound, west of U.S. 1
Spurrier's Tavern Stood On This Site – George Washington stopped here at least twenty five times between 1789 and 1798. On July 18, 1795, his diary says: "Dined and lodged at Spurrier's where my sick horse died." – State Roads Commission

== See also ==
- List of Howard County properties in the Maryland Historical Trust
- Oak Hill (Jessup, Maryland)
