= Jessup, Maryland =

- Census-designated place
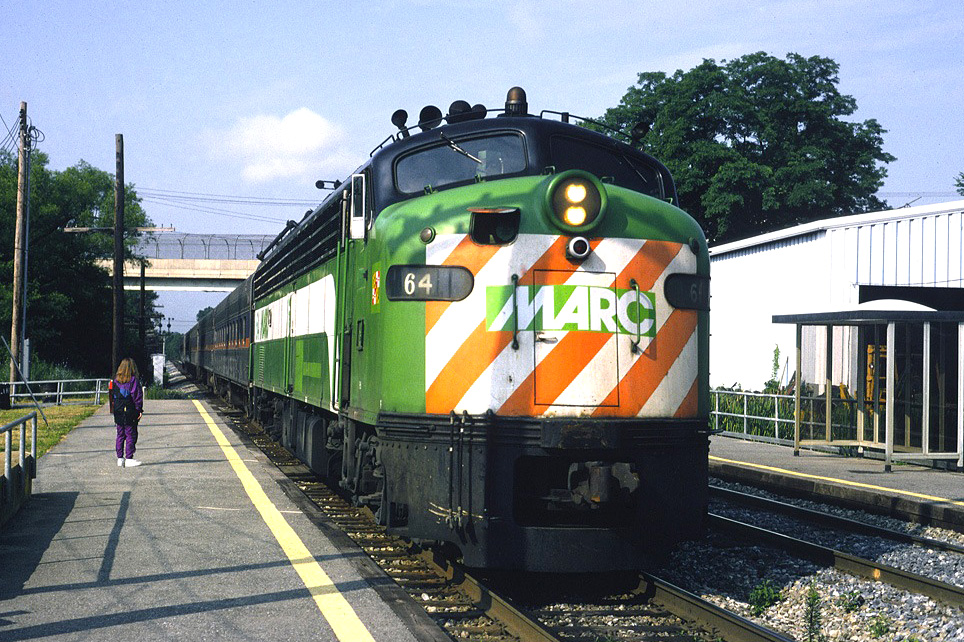
- A MARC train at Jessup in June 1994

- Location of Jessup, Maryland in Anne Arundel County
- Coordinates: 39°8′57″N 76°46′31″W
- Country: United States
- State: Maryland
- Counties: Anne Arundel; Howard
- Established: 1863
- Founder: Jonathan Jessup

Area
  - Total: 6.05 sq mi (15.68 km^{2})
  - Land: 6.05 sq mi (15.66 km^{2})
  - Water: 0.0039 sq mi (0.01 km^{2})
- Elevation: 217 ft (66 m)

Population (2020)
  - Total: 10,535
  - Density: 1,741.9/sq mi (672.56/km^{2})
- Time zone: UTC−5 (Eastern (EST))
  - Summer (DST): UTC−4 (EDT)
- ZIP code: 20794
- Area codes: 240, 301, 410, 443
- FIPS code: 24-42550
- GNIS feature ID: 0590560

Jessup (/ˈdʒɛsəp/ JESS-əp) is an unincorporated community and census-designated place in Howard and Anne Arundel counties, about 15 miles (24 km) southwest of Baltimore, Maryland, United States. Per the 2020 census, the population was 10,535.

== Geography ==
Jessup is located at 39°08′18″N 76°46′30″W (39.138374, −76.774929). According to the United States Census Bureau, the CDP has a total area of 5.3 square miles (13.6 km^{2}), all land. As of the 2010 census, the center of population for the state of Maryland is located on the grounds of the Clifton T. Perkins Hospital Center in Jessup.

== History ==
Jessup is located near the site of the historic Spurrier's Tavern, a farm and tavern located on the post road between Baltimore and Washington (Route One) where George Washington traveled regularly.

The location of the town was named Pierceland on early maps, but the post-civil war name more commonly given was Jessup's Cut, or Jessop's Cut, a post village in Howard County on the Baltimore and Ohio Railroad. The name is generally attributed to Jonathan Jessup, a civil engineer who worked on the Baltimore and Ohio Railroad and the hand-dug "cut" through Merrill's Ridge he managed as a project. The crews took over 200,000 tons of clay from the clay hill that blocked the trains in freezing weather. The clay was turned into bricks by some of the prisoners from the Maryland Penitentiary who also worked on the Maryland House of Corrections when it was being built. Some of those inmates were then transferred to the House of Correction and they knew the walls were made from Jessup's Cut, hence "the CUT". The name was shortened to Jessups in 1963. Into the mid 20th century, the town was called "Jessups", then was shortened to "Jessup".

Since the mid-19th century, the area has been home to various penal institutions. Inmates today still refer to these jails as "the cut," perhaps unaware of the origin of the name. The Maryland House of Correction, operated by the Maryland Department of Corrections, included a large onsite farm worked by prison labor to provide food for prisoners onsite and offsite. Prisoner labor was discouraged by job seekers in the 1970s much as it did 100 years earlier during the construction of the B&O at Jessup's Cut. The state-run Maryland Food Center occupies the land. The prison closed to inmates in 2007. However, it is referred to several times in the NBC television series Homicide: Life on the Street and the HBO original series, The Wire. Even though the maximum security prison is now closed, the town still houses a major minimum security prison, Brockbridge Correctional Facility, for violent offenders who are not deemed a threat to society due to the nature of their crimes.

Jessup contains many warehouse delivery facilities. Due to its geographically central location in the state, Jessup is also home to the Maryland Food Center, which includes the Maryland Produce Market and the Maryland Seafood Market. The largest facility was operated by Giant Food, with a 60-acre (24 ha) 760,000 sq ft (71,000 m^{2}) facility until September 2012. The company outsourced distribution to C&S Wholesale Grocers, relocating its operations to Pennsylvania. In 2013, Coastal Sunbelt Produce announced plans to relocate its 900-employee facility out of state claiming the facility was unable expand to adjacent empty parcels. Howard County was unable to relocate the facility to the vacant state-run facility, or the vacant 760,000sqft Giant Food facility with an offer to gift state land intended for a transportation hub to the company. County Executive Ken Ulman brokered a deal with Preston Scheffenacker Properties, rezoning the historic Duvall Farm site in Laurel, for light industrial use and issued county financed low-interest loans to relocate the facility out of Jessup.

Civil engineer Blake Van Leer put the railroad to use again by creating the first recycle and waste transfer stations on rail to cut emissions. Its official name is Annapolis Junction Recycling & Transfer Station, despite being located in Jessup. This facility sends most material out of state to Virginia.

Kingdon Gould's Laurel Sand and Gravel company, which includes Savage Stone, Fairfax Materials, Allegany Aggregates, Laurel Asphalt, and S.W. Barrick & Sons, purchased the 625-acre chase property in Eastern Jessup, North of the historic town of Savage, Maryland. The site is home to the Savage Stone quarry, mining Baltimore Gabbro rock for road bed construction. The facility started operations in 2005 after special zoning approval with a 25-year reserve in materials. Ridgley's Run Community Association directors Kingdon Gould and his son provided community approval of the project in exchange for the construction of the Ridgley's Run Community Center.

To the north of the quarry, Orson Adams built two nineteenth-century Victorian Manor Houses named Oak Hill on a 235-acre estate that anchored the community. The homes burned down after the Rouse Company purchased the land and have been redeveloped into apartments.

Resident film maker Wayne Shipley used Jessup as the production location for One-Eyed Horse (2008) and Day of the Gun (2013). Portions of Cry-Baby (1990) and Die Hard with a Vengeance (1995) were filmed in Jessup, with TA Travel Center standing in for Nord des Ligne Truck Stop in the latter film.

== Neighborhoods ==
Major neighborhoods of Jessup include:

- Jessup, community surrounding Jessup station in Anne Arundel County.
- Guilford, located at the intersection of US 1 and Guilford Road.
- Waterloo, located at the intersection of US 1 and Waterloo Road.

== Notable people ==
- Arnold Elzey, a major general in the Confederate army during the Civil War, retired to a small farm near Jessup.
- DeWanda Wise, an actor, was born in Jessup.

== Demographics ==
Historical population
Census	Pop.	Note	%±
2000	7,865		—
2010	7,137		−9.3%
2020	10,535		47.6%
U.S. Decennial Census; 2010 2020

=== Racial and ethnic composition ===
Jessup CDP, Maryland – Racial and ethnic composition Note: the US Census treats Hispanic/Latino as an ethnic category. This table excludes Latinos from the racial categories and assigns them to a separate category. Hispanics/Latinos may be of any race.
Race / Ethnicity (NH = Non-Hispanic)	Pop 2000	Pop 2010	Pop 2020	% 2000	% 2010	% 2020
White alone (NH)	2,412	2,472	2,759	30.67%	34.64%	26.19%
Black or African American alone (NH)	5,317	4,282	5,748	67.60%	60.00%	54.56%
Native American or Alaska Native alone (NH)	10	11	22	0.13%	0.15%	0.21%
Asian alone (NH)	26	55	617	0.33%	0.77%	5.86%
Native Hawaiian or Pacific Islander alone (NH)	0	0	1	0.00%	0.00%	0.01%
Other race alone (NH)	2	12	29	0.03%	0.17%	0.28%
Mixed race or Multiracial (NH)	17	37	260	0.22%	0.52%	2.47%
Hispanic or Latino (any race)	81	268	1,099	1.03%	3.76%	10.43%
Total	7,865	7,137	10,535	100.00%	100.00%	100.00%

=== 2020 census ===
As of the 2020 census, Jessup had a population of 10,535. The median age was 35.8 years. 10.9% of residents were under the age of 18 and 5.0% of residents were 65 years of age or older. For every 100 females there were 234.7 males, and for every 100 females age 18 and over there were 261.6 males age 18 and over.

100.0% of residents lived in urban areas, while 0.0% lived in rural areas.

There were 1,797 households in Jessup, of which 34.3% had children under the age of 18 living in them. Of all households, 43.4% were married-couple households, 23.4% were households with a male householder and no spouse or partner present, and 25.0% were households with a female householder and no spouse or partner present. About 26.0% of all households were made up of individuals and 5.1% had someone living alone who was 65 years of age or older.

There were 1,908 housing units, of which 5.8% were vacant. The homeowner vacancy rate was 0.9% and the rental vacancy rate was 7.0%.

=== 2000 census ===
As of the census of 2000, there were 7,865 people, 379 households, and 280 families residing in the CDP. The population density was 1,858.0 inhabitants per square mile (717.4/km^{2}). There were 398 housing units at an average density of 94.0 per square mile (36.3/km^{2}). The racial makeup of the CDP was 67.73% African American, 31.28% White, 1.03% Hispanic or Latino, 0.33% Asian, 0.27% from other races, 0.22% from two or more races, 0.15% Native American, and 0.03% Pacific Islander.

There were 379 households, out of which 29.6% had children under the age of 18 living with them, 57.5% were married couples living together, 9.5% had a female householder with no husband present, and 26.1% were non-families. 20.1% of all households were made up of individuals, and 6.1% had someone living alone who was 65 years of age or older. The average household size was 2.68 and the average family size was 3.04.

In the CDP, the population was spread out, with 3.2% under the age of 18, 15.9% from 18 to 24, 62.5% from 25 to 44, 16.3% from 45 to 64, and 2.0% who were 65 years of age or older. The median age was 34 years. For every 100 females, there were 499.9 males. For every 100 females age 18 and over, there were 539.7 males.

The median income for a household in the CDP was $48,000, and the median income for a family was $55,139. Males had a median income of $26,003 versus $24,950 for females. The per capita income for the CDP was $19,052. About 5.0% of families and 7.1% of the population were below the poverty line, including 7.1% of those under age 18 and 4.7% of those age 65 or over.

== Transportation ==
The Jessup stop on the Camden Line of the MARC Train system provides commuter rail service.

The major highways that run through Jessup are Interstate 95, U.S. Route 1 and Maryland Route 175. Exit 41 off I-95 provides access via MD 175 east.

== Government ==
The Federal Bureau of Prisons operates the Mid-Atlantic Region Office in Jessup and in Anne Arundel County. The Clifton T. Perkins Hospital Center, built in 1960, is a Maryland State-run maximum security hospital for criminals who are adjudged not guilty by reason of insanity.

== See also ==
- List of Howard County properties in the Maryland Historical Trust
