= Maryland House of Correction =

Former prison in Jessup, Maryland, US

Coordinates: 39.1437°N 76.7774°W

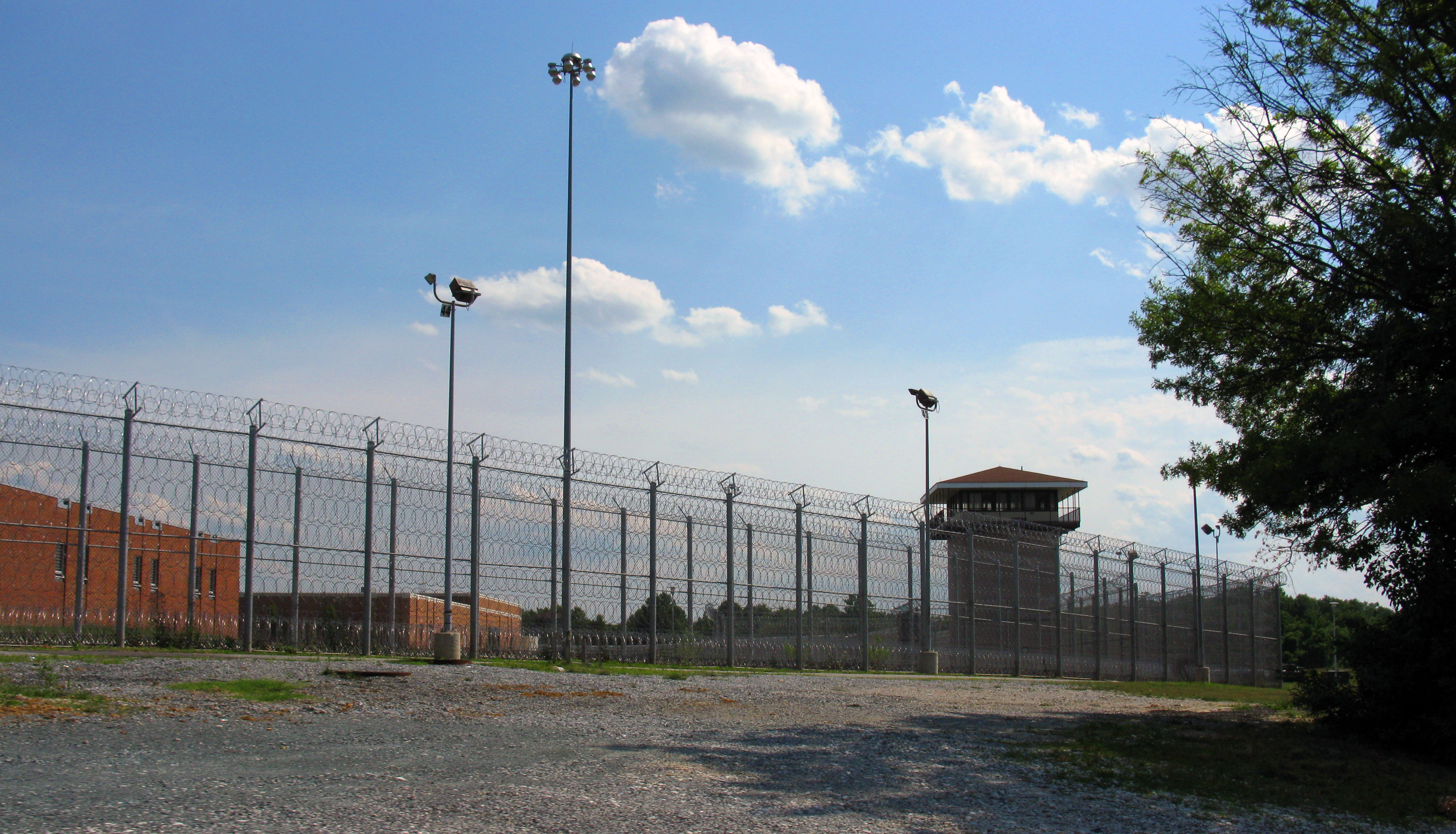
Maryland House of Correction, 2008. Taken after closure.

The Maryland House of Correction, nicknamed "The Cut" or "The House", was a Maryland Department of Corrections state maximum security prison in an unincorporated area in Maryland. The prison opened in 1879 and became infamous for the high levels of violence that took place inside its walls. The state, under Governor Martin O'Malley, closed the prison in March 2007.

The prison was situated on 800 acres (3.2 km^{2}) south of Maryland Route 175 between U.S. 1 and the Baltimore–Washington Parkway. Most of its territory was in Anne Arundel County, while portions were in Howard County.

== History ==
The facility was built on land near the former Spurrier's Tavern and a hand-dug section of the B&O railroad called "Jessop's Cut". In 1897, the Baltimore Sun editor petitioned for prison workers to perform road labor to relieve pressure on the overcrowded facility. The nickname "The Cut" was often used during HBO's series The Wire, and during the show's second season many scenes were set at Jessup.

The Maryland House of Correction had a long history of harsh living conditions for inmates and dangerous conditions for correctional officers. Large prison riots occurred in 1945, 1964 and 1972.

The prison was replaced in 2003 by North Branch Correctional Institution, a supermax prison in Cumberland, Maryland, with far greater control features and security. Demolition of the former prison began in January 2014.

== Death of correctional officer ==
In July, 2006, a Maryland correctional officer, David Warren McGuinn, was killed in the House of Corrections.

== See also ==
- Maryland Department of Public Safety and Correctional Services
- List of law enforcement agencies in Maryland
- List of United States state correction agencies
- List of U.S. state prisons
- Prison
