= Hopkins United Methodist Church =

Church in Maryland, United States

- Interactive map of the Hopkins United Methodist Church area

General information
- Location: Highland, Maryland
- Coordinates: 39.1909°N 76.9736°W
- Completed: 1882

Height
- Roof: Shingle

Hopkins United Methodist Church is a historic African American Church located at 13250 Highland Rd in Highland, Maryland.

The building was constructed in 1882. Operated as the Hopkins Chapel Colored School by order of the Howard County Public School board on December 5, 1883.

== See also ==
- Asbury Methodist Episcopal Church (Annapolis Junction, Maryland)
- Brown Chapel United Methodist Church
- First Baptist Church of Elkridge
- Locust United Methodist Church
- Mt. Moriah Lodge No. 7
- St. Stephens African Methodist Episcopal Church
