= Duvall Farm =

- Location within Maryland
- 39°06′35″N 76°49′46″W
- Location: Laurel, Maryland

History
- Built: Early 19th century

Site notes
- Area: Laurel
- Architectural style: Wood Frame

The Duvall Farm was a historic farm located in North Laurel, Howard County, Maryland, United States, now the site of Coastal Sunbelt Produce.

== History ==
The Duvall Farm was a historic farm worked by descendants of one of Maryland's earliest settlers, Mareen Duvall (1625–1699). The farm was situated on Whiskey Bottom Road, a historic path that once linked Mareen Duvall's Davidsonville plantation to other family plantations formed as settlers moved westward. Simon J. Martenet's 1860 Map of Howard County Maryland shows the farm along the crossroads of Route One, where George Washington once travelled. Robert L. Duvall and his wife Margret owned the property against the B&O tracks giving it the name "Elm Ridge". The site was the low point where barrels of Maryland Rye Whiskey would be delivered from nearby distilleries to load on trains, giving it the name "Whiskey Bottom". In 1914, a freight train struck the barn co-owned by Dr. Warfield and Duvall containing 6,000 pounds (2,700 kg) of tobacco.

In 1991, a Laurel man was charged with killing and setting his girlfriend Cathy May Baier on fire next to the race track, which resulted in a brush fire.

In April 2013 the Duvall Farm was burned from large brush fires that were considered connected to arson on the Laurel Fuel and Oil Company. Fire investigators ordered the house demolished rather than stabilize the historic structure.

The farm was adjacent to historic Laurel Park race track and rezoned for high density "transit-oriented development" under growth policies of Parris Glendening. The agricultural farm was rezoned in anticipation of reconstruction of the Laurel Racetrack station requested by Howard County Executive Kenneth Ulman, whose father was on the Maryland Racing Commission.

In 2014, Ulman provided a "development fast track" to relocate Coastal Sunbelt's facilities from Savage, Maryland. The Transit Oriented Development zoning was rapidly amended to include light industrial uses in January 2014. Since spot zoning for the benefit of a single entity is illegal, the zoning law also included a provision to expedite former planning and zoning director's Joseph Rutter's housing development project around the Rosa Bonheur Memorial Park Cemetery. Ulman was quoted in a newspaper saying "I think this was the fastest rezoning in Howard County history, because this about job creation. We had to get it done". Coastal Sunbelt Produce was offered $1 million in loans and $150,000 in Howard County tax credits to relocate to a 240,000-square-foot (22,000 m^{2}) Preston Scheffenacker Properties facility built on the Duvall Farm with a 99-year lease. The new facility covering the majority of the 33-acre site had a groundbreaking on August 18 with Lieutenant Governor Anthony Brown attending. The 900-employee Coastal Sunbelt operation said it would add 400 new jobs to meet the terms of its state loan.

== See also ==
- Duvall Bridge (Laurel, Maryland)
- Belair Mansion (Bowie, Maryland)
- Savage Mill
