= First Baptist Church of Elkridge =

Historic African American Church in Elkridge, Maryland, US

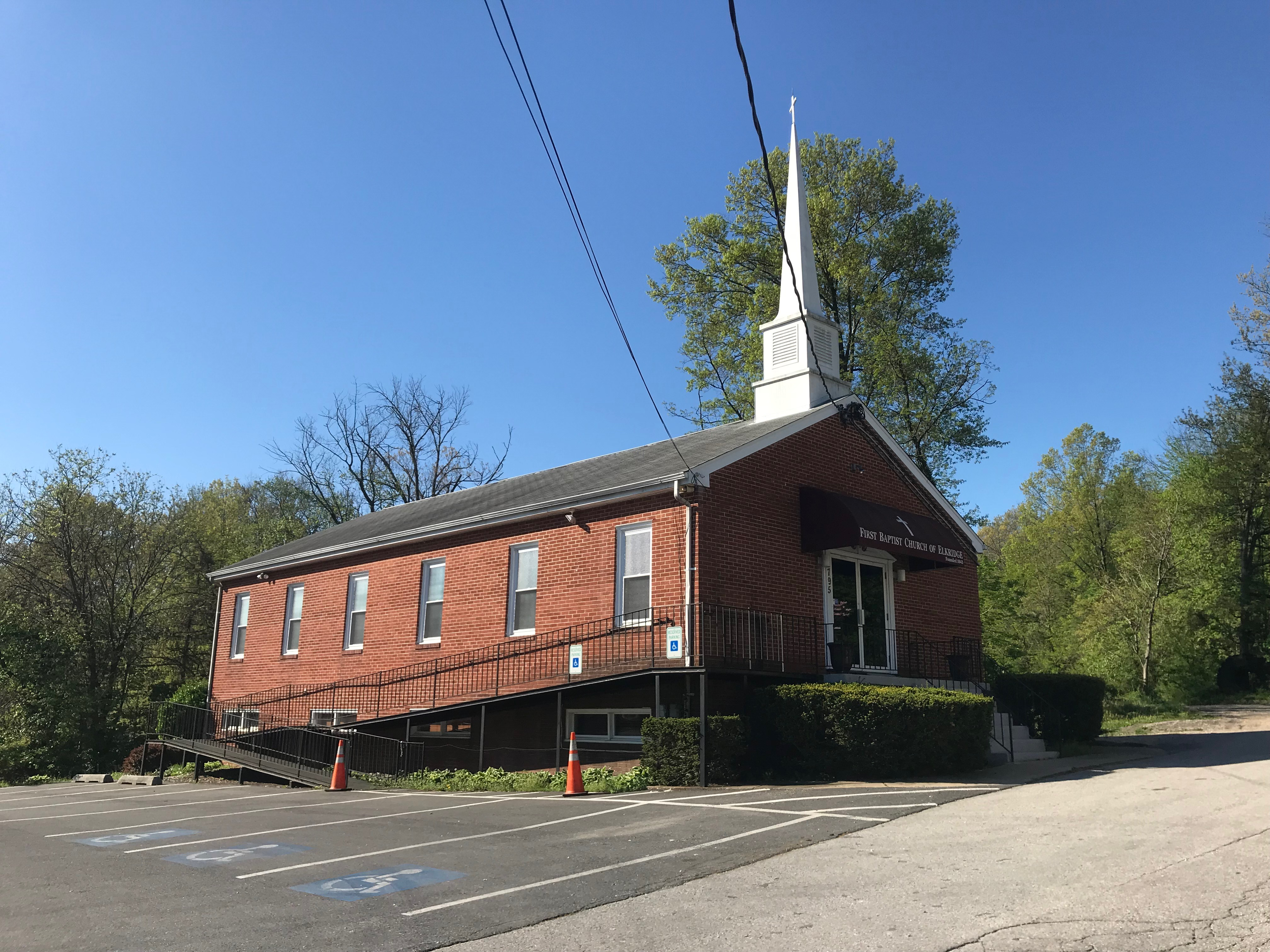
- First Baptist Church of Elkridge in April 2019
- Interactive map of the First Baptist Church of Elkridge area

General information
- Location: Elkridge, Maryland
- Coordinates: 39.2120744°N 76.7076942°W
- Completed: 1877

Height
- Roof: Shingle

First Baptist Church of Elkridge is a historic African American Church located at 5795 Paradise Ave in Elkridge, Maryland.

The building was constructed in 1877.

== See also ==
- Asbury Methodist Episcopal Church (Annapolis Junction, Maryland)
- Brown Chapel United Methodist Church
- Locust United Methodist Church
- Mt. Moriah Lodge No. 7
- St. Stephens African Methodist Episcopal Church
