= Brown Chapel United Methodist Church =

Church in Dayton, Mayland, US

- Interactive map of the Brown Chapel United Methodist Church area

General information
- Location: Dayton, Maryland
- Coordinates: 39.241350°N 76.992749°W
- Completed: 1875

Height
- Roof: Shingle

Brown Chapel United Methodist Church was a historic African American Church located at 13893 Dayton Meadows Ct in Dayton, Maryland.

The building was constructed in 1875. The church closed July 1, 2011.

== See also ==
- Asbury Methodist Episcopal Church (Annapolis Junction, Maryland)
- Locust United Methodist Church
- Mt. Moriah Lodge No. 7
