= St. Stephens African Methodist Episcopal Church =

Church in Maryland, United States

- Interactive map of the St. Stephens African Methodist Episcopal Church area

General information
- Location: Elkridge, Maryland
- Coordinates: 39.193516°N 76.778555°W
- Completed: 1874

Height
- Roof: Shingle

St. Stephens African Methodist Episcopal Church, is a historic African American church located at 7741 Mayfield Ave, Elkridge, Maryland.

The building was constructed in 1874.

== See also ==
- Mount Zion United Methodist Church (Ellicott City, Maryland)
- Asbury Methodist Episcopal Church (Annapolis Junction, Maryland)
- Mt. Moriah Lodge No. 7
