= Locust United Methodist Church =

Historic church in Columbia, Maryland

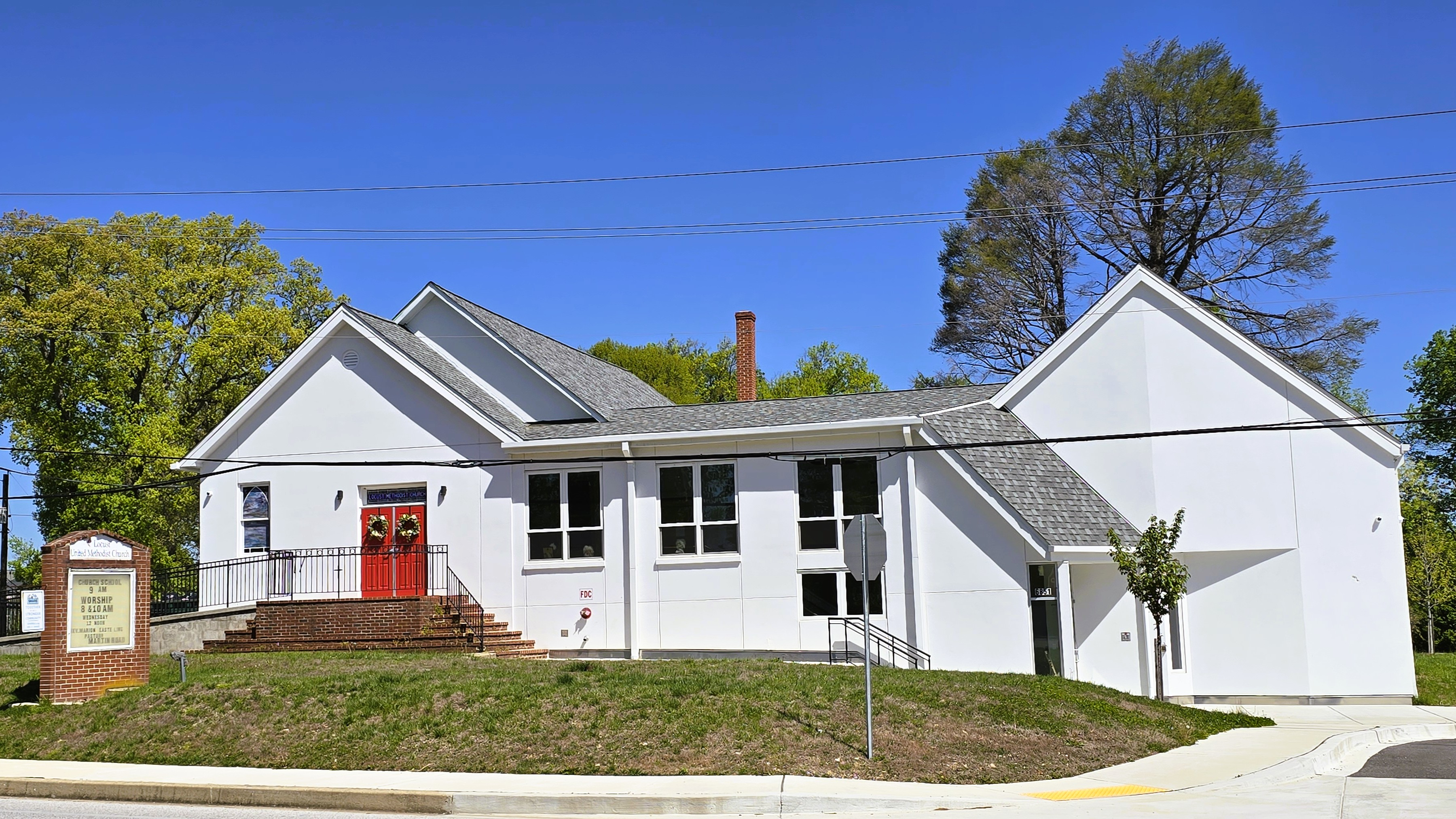

- Location within Maryland Locust United Methodist Church (the United States)
- Interactive map of the Locust United Methodist Church area

General information
- Location: 8105 Martin Road, Columbia, Maryland 21044
- Coordinates: 39.183754°N 76.877052°W
- Completed: 1843–1871
- Affiliation: United Methodist Church

Height
- Roof: Shingle

Website
- locustumc.org

The Locust United Methodist Church is a historic African-American church in Columbia, Maryland. (Once Simpsonville, Atholton and Freetown)

The building was constructed in a predominantly African-American community known as Freetown.

== See also ==
- Asbury Methodist Episcopal Church (Annapolis Junction, Maryland)
- Mt. Moriah Lodge No. 7
