= Asbury Methodist Episcopal Church (Annapolis Junction, Maryland) =

Church in Maryland, United States

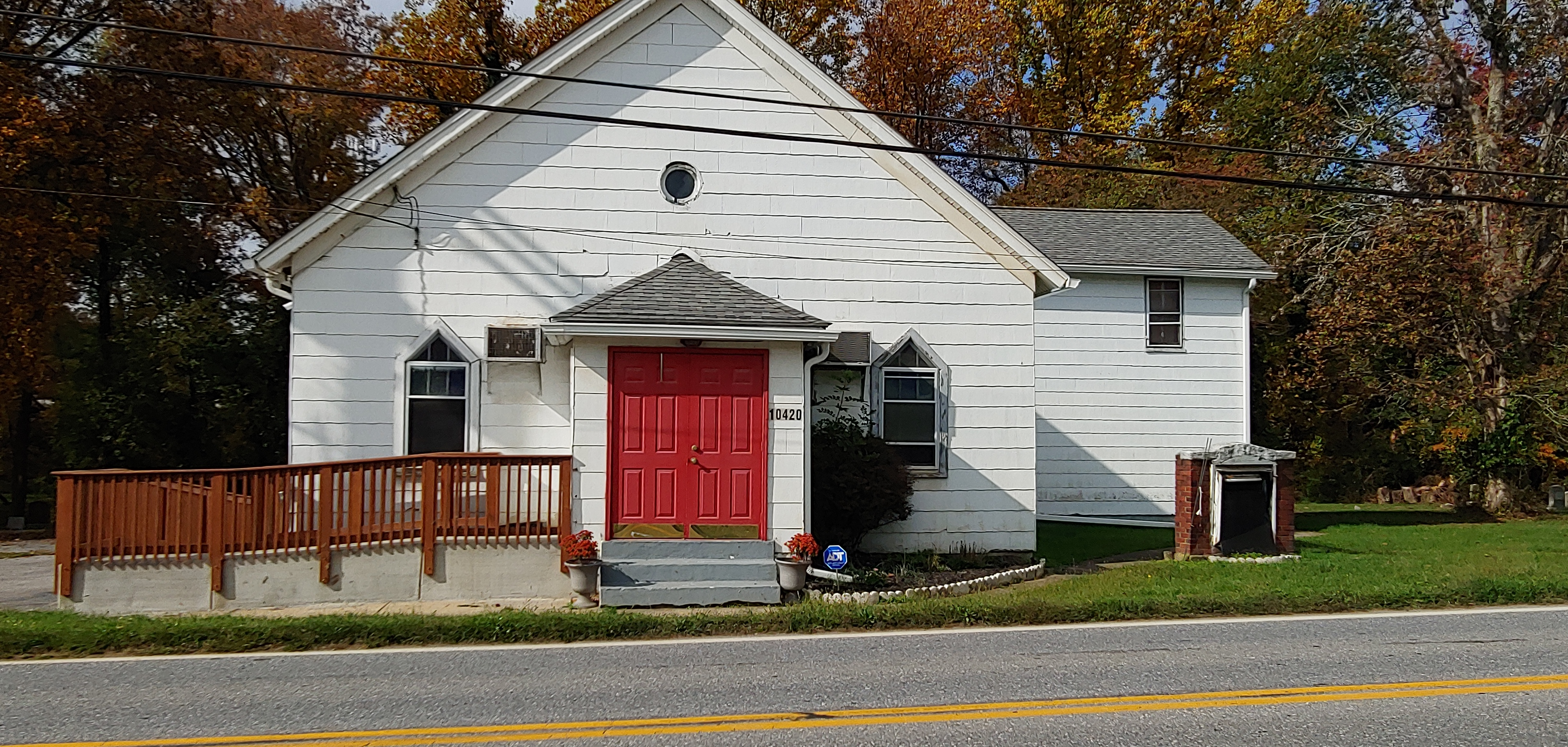
- Interactive map of the Asbury Methodist Episcopal Church area

General information
- Location: Guilford Road Annapolis Junction/Savage/Jessup Maryland
- Coordinates: 39.138732°N 76.806630°W
- Completed: 1875

Height
- Roof: Shingle

Asbury Methodist Episcopal Church, is a historic African American Church located in Jessup, Maryland.

The building was constructed in a predominantly African American community along Guilford Road, one of the "rolling roads" for hand-rolled barrel shipment of tobacco to market in Annapolis, Maryland. The site is associated with religious activities since 1860, in the final years of slavery in the newly formed Howard County. The wood-frame church has a later structure adjoined to serve as a schoolhouse. The church cemetery is situated to the North and West of the church. The graveyard boundaries were not formally defined, with several unmarked gravemounds surrounding the site. There are ten historical sites registered in the Maryland Historical Site Registry along the historical road within a mile of the church, but a reviewer commented there are "none along this segment of the road". The adjacent historic residences under pressure from development have had their construction dates removed from state tax records. The church has been reviewed and certified as being a significant example of architecture, ethnic history and religion. The Mt. Moriah Lodge No. 7 was built adjacent to the church in 1875.
