= Mt. Moriah Lodge No. 7 =

Historic building in Maryland, United States

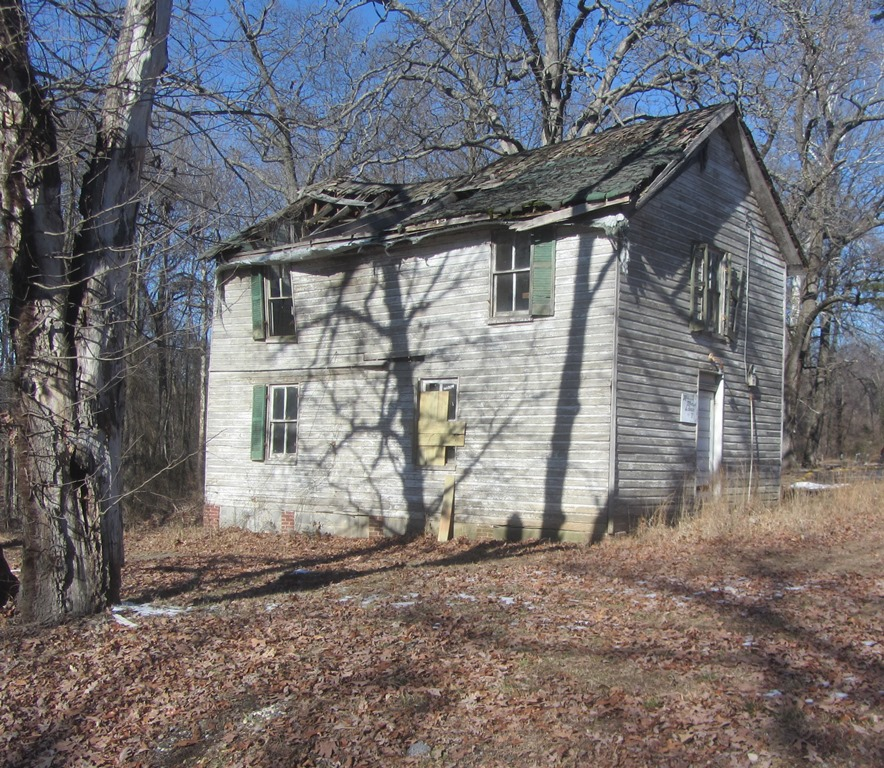
- Lodge in 2015
- Interactive map of the Mt. Moriah Lodge No. 7 area

General information
- Location: Guilford Road Jessup, Maryland
- Coordinates: 39.13829°N 76.80658°W
- Construction started: 1896
- Completed: 1896

Height
- Roof: Shingle

Design and construction
- Developer: Trustees and directors of Mount Moriah Lodge Number 7 Benevolent Sons and Daughters of Abraham

Mt. Moriah Lodge No. 7, is a historic building located in Jessup, Maryland. It is a two-story lodge constructed in the late 19th century.

The two-story building was constructed in a predominantly African American community along Guilford road, one of the "rolling roads" for hand-rolled barrel shipment of tobacco to market in Annapolis, Maryland. The building was constructed in conjunction with Asbury United Methodist Church built prior to 1860.

The building is a wood sided two-story gable front building constructed on brick columns. The bottom floor was open for community use. The side yard has a shared cemetery for Lodge members with a mix of marked and unmarked graves. The building resides on a half acre lot provided by Cornelius and Catherine Mack for $16 in 1896. An adjoining lot to the church was set aside for a colored school, which was not built. The modern Maryland Route 32 built in the 1960s parallels Guilford Road and is considered detrimental to the historical character of the site. In a 2003 historical inventory, the building was listed as vacant and had significant roof damage from a fallen tree and the property boundaries were reduced to a quarter acre.
