= List of roads in Howard County, Maryland =

== A ==
Road	Route	Places	Landmarks	Notes
All Saints Road	Whiskey Bottom Road to Old Scaggsville Road	Laurel	North Laurel community	

== B ==
Road	Route	Places	Landmarks	Notes
Baltimore National Pike	Edmondson Avenue (in Baltimore) to Frederick	Ellicott City; West Friendship; Cooksville; Lisbon	Brick House on the Pike	"Baltimore National Pike" is the designation for US-40 throughout Howard County. West of Ellicott City, US-40 merges into I-70, and the two routes share a path until Frederick. This part of I-70 is also known as Baltimore National Pike.
Banneker Road	Little Patuxent Pkwy to Shepherd Square	Town Center	Banneker Fire Station	Named after Benjamin Banneker
Bethany Lane	Old Frederick Road to Baltimore National Pike	Ellicott City	Enchanted Forest	Continues north of MD-99 as Old Mill Road and south of US-40 as Centennial Lane.
Brighton Dam Road	Ten Oaks Road to Market Street (in Montgomery County)	Clarksville	Triadelphia Reservoir; Brookeville Woolen Mill and House; Montrose	
Brightfield Road	Montgomery Road to Old Montgomery Road	Ellicott City		
Bonnie Branch Road	Montgomery Road to Ilchester Road	Ellicott City	Saint Mary's Seminary ruins	Named for Bonnie Branch
Broken Land Parkway	The Mall in Columbia to Guilford Road	Columbia; Owen Brown; Kings Contrivance	The Mall in Columbia; Lake Elkhorn	Exit 18 off US-29. Exit 14 off Maryland Route 32
Burntwoods Road	Roxbury Mills Road to Maryland Route 32	Glenwood, Glenelg	Glenelg High School	Continues as Andrea Drive beyond traffic circle interchange with Maryland Route 32.

== C ==
Road	Route	Places	Landmarks	Notes
Carrs Mill Road	Frederick Road to Maryland Route 97	Cooksville, Woodbine	Carrs Mill Park, Western Regional Park	Continues as McKendree Road east of MD Route 97
Cedar Lane	Harpers Farm Road to Guilford Road	Harper's Choice; Hickory Ridge; Simpsonville	Howard County General Hospital; Simpsonville Mill; James and Anne Robinson Nature Center	Continues south of Guilford Road as Pindell School Road. A second road known as "Cedar Lane" also exists north of this one from Rivendell Lane to a dead end just north of MD-108.
Centennial Lane	Baltimore National Pike to Clarksville Pike	Ellicott City	Centennial High School; Centennial Park	Continues north of Baltimore National Pike as Bethany Lane and south of Clarksville Road as Beaverbrook Road. Centennial Lane was built in 1876 as a shortcut through Burleigh Manor property between Clarksville and Ellicott City.
Centre Park Drive	Maryland Route 100 to Old Annapolis Road	Columbia		Exit 1C off of MD 100
Chatham Road	Ramblewood Road (Becomes Michaels Way) to Dead End	Ellicott City	First Lutheran Church	Two segments divided by Frederick Road (Runs as N. Chatham Road north of Frederick Road.)
Clarksville Pike	US-29 interchange to Montgomery County line (at Patuxent River)	Clarksville; Wilde Lake; Dorsey's Search; Highland	Centennial Park; Middle Patuxent Environmental Area; Rocky Gorge Reservoir	Exit 21 off US-29. MD-108 continues east of US-29 interchange as Old Annapolis Road, and in Montgomery County as "Ashton Road".
Coca-Cola Drive	Hi-Tech Drive to Dorsey Road	Hanover	Oxford Square, Thomas Viaduct Middle School	Exit 8 off MD 100. Crosses into Anne Arundel County after CSX tracks. Named after Coca-Cola for planned bottling plant that was never built.
College Avenue	Saint Paul Street to Bonnie Branch Road	Ellicott City	Sheppard Pratt at Ellicott City, Seven Hills	
Cradlerock Way	Broken Land Parkway to Homespun Drive; circles back to Broken Land Parkway	Owen Brown	Lake Elkhorn, East Columbia Branch Library	Marked as North and South Cradlerock Way to distinguish circle entrances from Broken Land Parkway.

== D ==
Road	Route	Places	Landmarks	Notes
Dobbin Road	Oakland Mills Road to Snowden River Parkway	Long Reach	East Columbia Business District	Named for Judge George Washington Dobbin
Dorsey Road	Scarlet Oak Drive to dead end southeast of Race Road (in Anne Arundel County)	Elkridge	Dorsey MARC rail station	Continues northwest as Meadowridge Road. There is another Dorsey Road in Anne Arundel County, most of which is designated MD-176.
Dorsey Run Road	Dorsey Road in Elkridge to Deer Creek Court (in Anne Arundel County)	Elkridge Jessup Savage	Jessup MARC rail station, Dorsey MARC rail station	Provides an alternate bypass route to Washington Boulevard.
Ducketts Lane	Bauman Drive to Washington Boulevard	Elkridge	Ducketts Lane Elementary School	

== E ==
Road	Route	Places	Landmarks	Notes
Eden Brook Drive	Old Columbia Road to Dead End south of First League	Kings Contrivance	Dickinson Park; Kings Contrivance Village Center	Exit 15 off of MD 32
Eliot's Oak Road	Maryland Route 108 to Harpers Farm Road	Columbia	Columbia Athletic Club; Longfellow Neighborhood	Named for T. S. Eliot
Executive Park Drive	Maryland Route 100 to Traffic Circle with Weathered Drive and Santa Fe Court	Columbia	Montjoy	Exit 1B from MD 100

== F ==
Road	Route	Places	Landmarks	Notes
Farewell Road	Stevens Forest Road to Oakland Mills Road	Columbia		Continues west as Night Street Hill
Frederick Road	Two discontinuous roads: Lakeview Drive to Baltimore National Pike; Baltimore National Pike to Baltimore Street (in Baltimore)	Ellicott City; Lisbon; Cooksville; West Friendship	Roberts Inn	Known as Main Street in historic Ellicott City
Florence Road	Shaffers Mill Road to Ed Warfield Road	Woodbine		
Furnace Avenue	Begins at Main Street in Elkridge and ends at the Deep Run Bridge in Howard County. Terminates at a T Intersection in Anne Arundel County with Furnace Avenue and Ridge Road.	Elkridge; Hanover	Elkridge Furnace Complex	Named for the Elkridge Furnace

== G ==
Road	Route	Places	Landmarks	Notes
Gerwig Lane	Dead end west of Minstrel Way to Guilford Road	Columbia		
Gorman Road	Kindler Road to Washington Boulevard (in Prince George's County	Savage, North Laurel		Becomes Johns Hopkins Road in Fulton
Governor Warfield Parkway	Little Pauxent Parkway to Little Pauxent Parkway	Columbia Town Center	An entrance to The Mall in Columbia	Continues south of Little Pauxent Parkway as Banneker Road. Named after former Maryland governor Edwin Warfield.
Great Star Drive	Clarksville Pike to Guilford Road	Clarksville, River Hill	River Hill Village Center	Exit 19 from Maryland Route 32 (Northbound only)
Guilford Road	Two segments: Clarksville Pike to Sanner Road, and Old Columbia Road to National Business Parkway in Anne Arundel County	Clarksville, Columbia, Kings Contrivance, Savage	Guilford Park, Kings Contrivance Village Center, Mt. Moriah Lodge No. 7	Exit 10D from Maryland Route 32 (Northbound only)

== H ==
Road	Route	Places	Landmarks	Notes
Hall Shop Road	Clarksville Pike to Guilford Road	Highland	Schooley Mill Park	
Hanover Road	Old Washington Road to Deep Run Bridge	Elkridge		Continues in Anne Arundel County to Ridge Road.
Harriet Tubman Lane	Cedar Lane to Martin Road	Columbia	Harriet Tubman School	Named for Harriet Tubman
Hoods Mill Road	Woodbine Road to Frederick Road	Cooksville		Exit 76 off I-70
High Tor Hill	Phelps Luck Drive to Tamar Drive	Columbia	Phelps Luck Elementary School	
Hipsley Mill Road	Jennings Chapel Road to Laytonsville Road (in Montgomery County)	Woodbine		

== I ==
Road	Route	Places	Landmarks	Notes
Ilchester Road	Montgomery Road to Patapsco River. Becomes River Road in Baltimore County, and ends at Frederick Road.	Ellicott City, Catonsville	Saint Mary's Seminary Ruins, Patapsco Valley State Park, Patterson Viaduct	

== J ==
Road	Route	Places	Landmarks	Notes
Jennings Chapel Road	Florence Road to Roxbury Mills Road		Jennings Chapel Methodist Church	Named for Jennings Chapel
Johns Hopkins Road	Pindell School Road to Gorman Road		Applied Physics Laboratory	Exit 15 off US-29

== K ==
Road	Route	Places	Landmarks	Notes
Kilimanjaro Road	Stevens Forest Road to Oakland Mills Road	Columbia	Oakland Mills Middle School, Oakland Mills High School	Named for Mount Kilimanjaro

== L ==
Road	Route	Places	Landmarks	Notes
Landing Road	Montgomery Road to Ilchester Road	Elkridge	Rockburn Branch Park, Cascade Falls	Named for Elkridge Landing
Lark Brown Road	Allen Lane to Old Waterloo Road	Elkridge, Columbia	Columbia Restaurant Park, Gateway Overlook Shopping Center	
Lawyers Hill Road	Montgomery Road to Levering Avenue/River Road	Elkridge	Lawyers Hill Historic District	Named for Lawyers Hill
Levering Avenue	Lawyers Hill Road/River Road to Main Street (Elkridge)	Elkridge	Lawyers Hill Historic District, Thomas Viaduct, Patapsco Valley State Park	
Little Patuxent Parkway	Waterloo Road to end at circle to itself	Town Center	The Mall in Columbia; Howard County General Hospital; Howard Community College; Merriweather Post Pavilion	Named for the Little Patuxent River
Long Corner Road	Dead end north of Frederick Road to Damascus Road in Montgomery County	Mt. Airy		
Long Gate Parkway	Montgomery Road to Meadowbrook Lane	Ellicott City		Exit 1A off MD-100, used to access MD-103 from US-29 northbound.

== M ==
Road	Route	Places	Landmarks	Notes
Main Street (Ellicott City)	Name for Frederick Road in historic Ellicott City	Ellicott City	Ellicott City Historic District, Ellicott City Station	
Main Street (Elkridge)	Two disconnected segments: Old Washington Road to Brumbaugh Street and Railroad Avenue to Washington Blvd	Elkridge	Historic Elkridge, Brumbaugh House, Grace Cemetery	Original route of U.S. Route 1. Bisected by CSX Railroad.
Maple Lawn Boulevard	Johns Hopkins Road to Maryland Route 216	Fulton	Maple Lawn	Continues as Sanner Road north of Johns Hopkins Road
Marriottsville Road	Frederick Road to Runnymead Road (in Baltimore County)	Ellicott City; Woodstock	Waverley	Exit 83 off I-70
Marshalee Drive	Montgomery-Meadowridge Roads to Montgomery Road	Ellicott City; Elkridge	Marshalee, Timbers at Troy Golf Course	
Mayfield Avenue	Montgomery-Meadowridge Roads to Waterloo Road	Ellicott City; Elkridge	Mayfield Woods Middle School	
Meadowridge Road	Brightfield Road to Washington Boulevard	Elkridge		Exit 4 off MD-100. Continues northwest of Brightfield Road as Montgomery Road, and southeast of Washington Boulevard as Dorsey Road
Mellenbrook Road	Maryland Route 108 to Mellen Court	Columbia	Thunder Hill Elementary School	Continues northward as Bendix Road
Mission Road	Guilford Road to Washington Boulevard	Jessup	Ridgely's Community Center, Savage Mine	
Montgomery Road	Old Washington Road to Old Columbia Pike	Ellicott City; Elkridge	Elkridge Elementary and Middle Schools, Ellicott Mills Middle School, Elkridge Corners Shopping Center, Long Gate Shopping Center	Exit 23 off US-29 for Maryland Route 103 portion in Ellicott City.
Montevideo Road	Washington Blvd to Race Rd in Anne Arundel County.	Elkridge		Used as the town line for Elkridge and Jessup.

== O ==
Road	Route	Places	Landmarks	Notes
Oakland Mills Road	Sohap Lane to Guilford Road	Oakland Mills, Columbia, Maryland	Christ Church Guilford	
Old Annapolis Road	Eastern segment runs east from US-29 to Waterloo Road. Western segment runs west from Old Route 108 to Centennial Lane.	Columbia	Dorsey's Search, Centennial Park North	Exit 21 off US-29.
Old Columbia Pike	Frederick Road to Montgomery Road	Ellicott City		Formerly designated MD-987
Old Columbia Road	Three discontinuous segments: Twin Knolls Road to Dead End, Dead End beyond Eden Brook Drive to Johns Hopkins Road, and Maryland Route 216 to Harding Road.	Columbia, Fulton	Oakland Mills Blacksmith House and Shop	All three roads run parallel to US 29.
Old Frederick Road	Twin Arch Road to US-29	Mt. Airy; Woodbine; Cooksville; Sykesville; Marriottsville; Woodstock; Ellicott City		
Old Montgomery Road	Three discontinuous roads: Oakland Mills Road to Brunners Run Court, Majors Lane to dead end after Welcome Home Drive, Tamar Drive to Montgomery Road (MD Route 103)	Columbia; Ellicott City	Was the original alignment of Montgomery Road heading west.	
Old Washington Road	Washington Boulevard and Abel Street to Washington Boulevard and Main Street	Elkridge	Historic Elkridge; Saint Augustine Church; Elkridge Fire Station	Was originally the route of U.S. 1 in Elkridge.
Owen Brown Road	Two segments: Cedar Lane to Dead End beyond Dewey Drive, and Dead End to Dead End (between Forty Winks Way and Orient Lane)	Owen Brown, Oakland Mills		

== P ==
Road	Route	Places	Landmarks	Notes
Pfefferkorn Road	Frederick Road to Ten Oaks Road	West Friendship		Exit off of MD 32 for Burntwoods Road
Phelps Luck Drive	Tamar Drive to Old Annapolis Road	Columbia	Jackson Pond	Continues north as Centre Park Drive
Pindell School Road	Guilford Road to Scaggsville Road	Fulton, Highland		

== R ==
Road	Route	Places	Landmarks	Notes
Race Road	Furnace Avenue to Hanover Road. Second leg continues on Anne Arundel County side of Hanover Road, and terminates at Route 175	Hanover, Jessup	Deep Run	
Ridge Road	Bond Street (in Carroll County to I-270 interchange (in Frederick County)	Mt. Airy		Exit 68 off I-70
Ridge Road	Rogers Avenue to Dead End, east of Patapsco River Road	Ellicott City	Ridge Road Business Area; Ellicott City Post Office	Exit 24A off US 29; Referred to as N. Ridge Road north of Baltimore National Pike
River Road	Lawyers Hill Road/Levering Avenue to Rockburn Hill Road	Ellicott City, Elkridge	Patapsco Valley State Park	Continues northwest as a park service road until the Swinging Bridge. The original segment connected to Ilchester Road, but was washed away and is now a walking path.
Robert Fulton Drive	Snowden River Parkway to Columbia Gateway Drive	East Columbia Business District	Snowden Square Shopping Center, Columbia Gateway Business Park	Exit off Snowden River Parkway
Rogers Avenue	Frederick Road to US-29	Ellicott City	Howard County Government Campus	Continues west of US-29 as Old Frederick Road
Rowanberry Drive	Montgomery Road to Washington Boulevard	Elkridge	Elkridge Branch Library; Elkridge Fire Station	Continues north as Lawyers Hill Road, and east as Pine Avenue
Roxbury Mills Road	Frederick Road to Montgomery County line	Brookeville; Glenwood	Roxbury Mill; Patuxent River State Park; Union Chapel	continues north of Frederick Road as Hoods Mill Road and south of Patuxent River as Georgia Avenue.

== S ==
Road	Route	Places	Landmarks	Notes
Saint Johns Lane	Old Frederick Road to Montgomery Road	Ellicott City	Mount Hebron High School	Exit 23 off US-29 Southbound.
Sand Hill Road	Old Frederick Road to Frederick Road	Ellicott City	Crestlawn Cemetery	
Scaggsville Road	Clarksville Pike to Doves Fly Way	Highland; Fulton; North Laurel	Reservoir High School	Exit 13 off US-29. West of US-29, designated as MD-216. East of US-29, splits off MD-216 and carries no numerical designation. MD-216 continues as a separate road to Laurel. On its north end, continues north of MD-108 as Highland Road with no numerical designation.
Seneca Drive	Martin Road to Wesleigh Drive	Columbia	Atholton Elementary School	Exit 17 off US-29
Shaker Drive	Allview Drive to Guilford Road (continues as Eden Brook Drive)	Columbia		Exit 17 off US-29
Sheppard Lane	Folly Quarter Road/Carroll Mill Road to Maryland Route 108	Clarksville		
Snowden River Parkway	MD-100 to Broken Land Parkway (continues as Patuxent Woods Drive)	Columbia; Ellicott City		Exit 3 off MD-100
South Entrance Road	U.S. Route 29 to Little Patuxent Parkway	Columbia	Central Library; Merriweather Post Pavilion; Toby's Dinner Theatre	Exit 19 off US 29 (southbound only). Originally the southern entrance to Columbia.
Stansfield Road	Old Bond Mill Road to Old Scaggsville Road	Scaggsville; Laurel	Rocky Gorge Reservoir	
Stephens Road	Gorman Road to Maryland Route 216	Laurel	Rocky Gorge Reservoir	Exit off of eastbound MD 216; Continues as Stone Lake Drive north of Gorman Road
Stevens Forest Road	Middle Drive to Beechwood Drive	Columbia	Oakland Mills Village Center	
Sykesville Road	I-70 interchange to Old Washington Road (in Carroll County	West Friendship; Marriottsville		Exit 80 off I-70. Continues north of Old Washington Road as Washington Road, and south of I-70 interchange known only as MD-32 with no name.

== T ==
Road	Route	Places	Landmarks	Notes
Tamar Drive	Rainprint Row to Saddle Drive	Long Reach	Long Reach Village Center	
Thunder Hill Road	Old Annapolis Road to Santiago Road	Oakland Mills	Oakland Mills Village Center	
Toll House Road	Frederick Road to Old Columbia Pike	Ellicott City		Ellicott City Truck Route
Town and Country Boulevard	North Ridge Road to Rogers Avenue	Ellicott City		Continues east as Adderley Avenue and west as Normandy Center Drive
Triadelphia Road	Frederick Road to Triadelphia Mill Road	Ellicott City, Glenelg	Triadelphia Ridge Elementary School	
Trotter Road	Clarksville Pike to Gentle Light Lane	Columbia	Middle Patuxent Environmental Area; River Hill Pool	Continues as Meadow Vista Way north of MD 108
Twin Rivers Road	Harpers Farm Road to Columbia Mall Circle	Columbia	The Mall in Columbia; Wilde Oak Village Center	

== W ==
Road	Route	Places	Landmarks	Notes
Washington Boulevard	Dover Street (in Baltimore) to near Cherry Lane (in Prince George's County)	Elkridge; Jessup; Guilford; Savage; North Laurel	Trinity Church	Exit 3 off I-195, 6 off MD-100, and 12 off MD-32.
Waterloo Road	Montgomery Road to Little Patuxent Parkway	Also is name for MD 175 from MD 108 junction to Oceano Avenue in Jessup, Maryland	Ellicott City; Columbia; Elkridge	Exit 2 off MD-100. Carries two designations on different parts of the route: MD-104 and MD-108.
Watersville Road	Frederick Road to Old Frederick Road	Mount Airy		Runs as two East/West segments from Watersville Road heading north. East Watersville Road continues as Hardy Road beyond Frederick Road.
Whiskey Bottom Road	Maryland Route 198 to Dead End	North Laurel	Edy's Ice Cream Plant	
Woodbine Road	Liberty Road (in Carroll County to Annapolis Rock Road	Woodbine; Mt. Airy; Lisbon	Patuxent River State Park	Exit 73 off I-70.
Woodstock Road	Old Frederick Road to Baltimore County line (continues as Old Court Road)	Woodstock		
