= James Macgill (judge) =

American judge

- Born: November 9, 1912
- Died: June 1993 (aged 80)
- Education: Johns Hopkins
- Occupation: Judge
- Known for: First Howard County Zoning director, First Howard County Planning director, Howard County Judge, artist.
- Successor: J. Thomas Nissel

James Macgill (November 9, 1912 – June 1993) was an American judge from Howard County, Maryland.

James Macgill is a direct descendant of James Macgill, the rector for Christ Church Guilford, appointed in 1730. Macgill lived at the Manor House Athol in Simpsonville, Maryland. He grew up in one of the stone buildings east of the manor house, settled on a parcel named Warfields Contrivance. Macgill would sell the homestead to land developer and businessman Kingdon Gould, who would operated the building as a restaurant named King's Contrivance.

Macgill attended Howard County Public Schools, and Donaldson Preparatory in Ilchester, Maryland. His family owned an interest in the Display Doughnut Corporation in Ellicott City. Macgill graduated from the Johns Hopkins University in 1934 and the University of Maryland School of Law in 1939, passing the Maryland Bar the same year. During 1941–1944, he served with the British army driving an ambulance in India and Burma theaters. In 1948, he became the county's first zoning commissioner, and in 1951, became the first planning director. In 1955, he was appointed assistant judge and in 1965 became chief judge and judge of the Juvenile court. In 1963, Macgill ruled that slot machines in Maryland were unconstitutional as a form of lottery. He appointed members to draft a powerful form of charter government in October 1964 (taking until 1970 to be voted in). Macgill retired in 1980. His last case ruled that Howard County could not require developers to set aside public space for county use as a park or school. On March 1, 1980, Governor Harry Hughes appointed J. Thomas Nissel to replace Macgill.

In 1984, Macgill was chosen as a judge and sculptor to serve as arbitrator between the Howard Arts United chosen by the County Council, and Arts Grants Committee chosen by executive J. Hugh Nichols to distribute art funds from the county.
