= Athol (Simpsonville, Maryland) =

Atholton
- Location within Maryland
- 39°19′19″N 76°50′00″W
- Nearest city: Simpsonville, Maryland

History
- Built: abt 1732

Located in the Simpsonville area of Columbia in Howard County, Maryland, United States, Athol Plantation.

Reverend James Macgill of Scotland, built the plantation house on lands patented in 1730. The stone house was constructed by masons brought from his homeland stating in 1732, and was completed in 1740. A square cupola and porch were added in the 19th century, and later removed. In 1866 the house was the residence of Richard Gambrill MacGill. From 1927 to 1946 the Melvin Coar family occupied the house.

== See also ==
- Atholton, Maryland
- Christ Church Guilford
