= Forest View =

Forest View or Forestview may refer to:

== Education ==
- Forest View High School, Tokoroa, New Zealand
- Forest View High School (Illinois), Arlington Heights, Illinois, US
- Forestview High School, Gastonia, North Carolina, US
- Forest View, a Durham Public Schools elementary school, North Carolina, US

== Places ==
- Forest View, Illinois, US
- Forest View (Howard County, Maryland), a building on the US National Register of Historic Places
- Forestview, Prince Edward Island, Canada
- Forest View, a locality in Municipal District of Smoky River No. 130, Alberta, Canada
