= Shipley House =

Historic house in Maryland, U.S.

- Nearest city: Alpha, Maryland
- Coordinates: 39°19′13″N 76°54′58″W
- Built: c. 1830

The Shipley House was located in Alpha, Howard County, Maryland, near Marriottsville. The house was among five other buildings supporting a farm in Alpha, Maryland. The 55-acre (22 ha) property was part of a 3,440-acre (1,390 ha) land grant named Woodford patented in 1727. John Taylor acquired the land and 2,707 acres (1,095 ha) of the estate were sold to Phillip Hammond in 1744. In 1777, Charles Hammond bequeathed 1,500 acres (610 ha) of Woodford and his slaves to his son. Nathan Shipley acquired a portion and through inheritance, Joshua H. Shipley acquired 77 acres (31 ha) of the Woodford estate, raising 12 children on-site. The slave plantation harvested tobacco and grain crops. The frame farm house was constructed in 1830. Outbuildings included a wellhouse (1900), a frame shed (1835), and a bank barn (1884).

John and Mary O'Mara farmed and maintained the property as Sunnyside Farm, raising hoses and cattle until sale in 1979. The farm was purchased by Howard County in 1979 as possible expansion space for the controversial Alpha Ridge Landfill project. The county boarded up the properties without maintenance. In August 1992, the firm of Goodwin and Associates determined that the deterioration that occurred in twelve years of ownership by Howard County negated any effort to preserve the property. The land was converted to the Alpha Ridge Community Park in 1994, demolishing the Shipley House and outbuildings to replace them with a complex of revenue generating ball fields and facilities.

== See also ==
- Alpha Ridge Landfill
