= Hatfield Safe House =

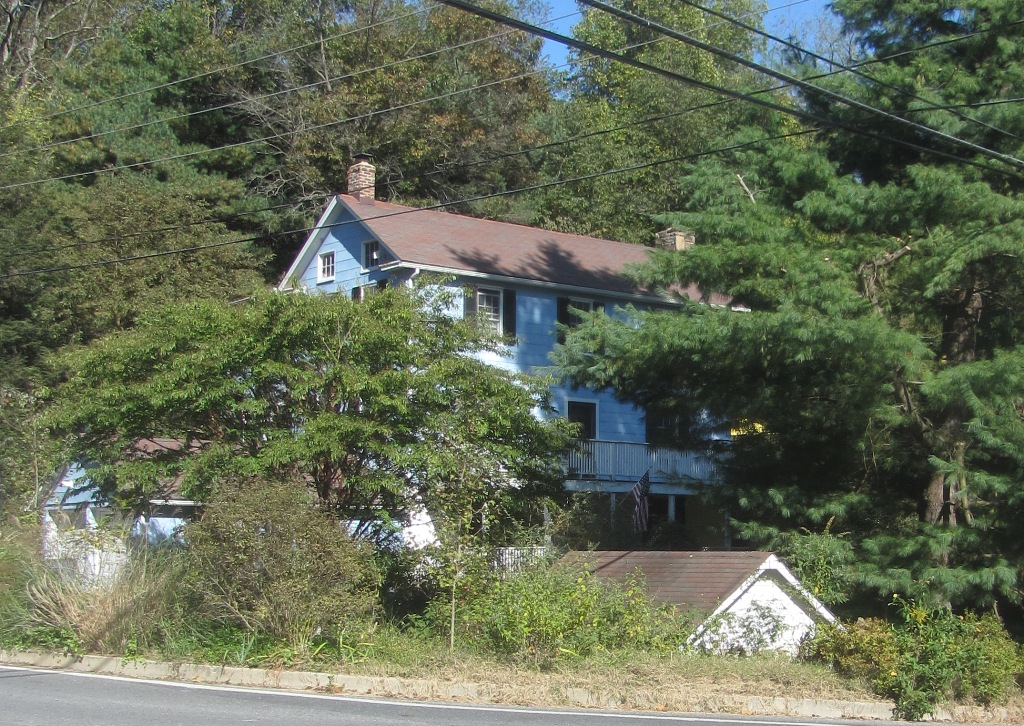
- Hatfield Safe House

- Location within Maryland
- 39°11′18″N 76°53′34″W
- Location: 6691 Cedar Drive (Simpsonville) Columbia, Maryland

History
- Built: 1840

Site notes
- Area: 3 acres (1.2 ha)
- Governing body: Private

Hatfield Safe House, or Simpsonville Mill Miller's House is a historic home located at Columbia, Howard County, Maryland, United States.

The three-story wood-framed house is three bays wide and one bay deep on a 9-acre parcel.

A house was built on a stone foundation built in 1755 for a possible grist mill. It is known as a safe house for the Underground Railroad. The original structure burned down, with a new frame building built on the original foundation.

From 1865 to 1878 it was owned by William Braysahaw. In 1878, James Simpson resided at the residence to which "Simpsonville" is named. In the late 1920s the terraced landscape was dotted with chicken coops. From 1909 to 1934 the house was the residence of county commissioner William W. Inglehardt. The building is a component of Simpsonville Historic District.

== See also ==
- Simpsonville Mill
- James and Anne Robinson Nature Center
