= Alpha Ridge Landfill =

Landfill in Maryland, United States

- Country: United States
- Location: Marriottsville, Maryland
- Coordinates: 39°18′17.935″N 76°54′6.973″W
- Status: Operational
- Commission date: 1980
- Site area: 590 acres

Power generation
- Nameplate capacity: 1059KW

External links
- Website: www.howardcountymd.gov/Departments/Public-Works/Bureau-Of-Environmental-Services/Alpha-Ridge-Landfill

The Alpha Ridge Landfill (Alpha Ridge Sanitary Landfill) is a municipal solid waste landfill located in Marriottsville, Maryland, once known as the postal town of Alpha, Maryland.

Alpha Ridge is the third official landfill built in Howard County, Maryland. Howard County's first landfill was New Cut in Ellicott City, Maryland which operated from 1944 to 1980 followed by Carr's Mill, operated between 1953 and 1977.

== History ==
Alpha Ridge was proposed in the late 1970s as an unpopular project that strained the public participation process to address the needs of a population expansion that would quadruple while it was in operation. The search for a third County landfill started in 1973 with opposition causing the drop of selections at Triadelphia Road and Route 144, Interstate 70 and Sand Hill Road and Henryton Road at Route 99. In 1976 the search centered around the 600-acre Burliegh Manor slave plantation purchased by future Maple Lawn developer Steward Greenbaum. Community members quit the site study claiming they were denied meaningful participation. When updating the historical status of the plantation in 1976, County archivist Cleora Barnes Thompson added "It should be stated here that the presence of a landfill in the surrounding area of Burliegh might not be in any way harmful as it will prevent the encroachment of future suburban development and will later provide a large area for a park, recreation or open space". Protests from citizens and Goodloe Byron against Clarksville, Guilford and Ellicott City sites left Marriotsville as the site with least opposition. Gibes Realty-Woodbrier Enterprises put together an offer of $3900 an acre to purchase land contracts. The Company owners, Robert and James Moxley were the original land speculators for Columbia and children of former County Chairman Norman E. Moxley. In February 1977 the Gibes-Woodbrier Alpha Ridge site was selected at the end of County Executive Edward L. Cochran's term. His wife became the realtor for the subdivision of Burleigh Manor afterward. Howard County Citizens for Conservation gathered 3000 signatures against the project and sued the county for lack of public meetings on the selection. The suit was dismissed in May with acknowledgement that meetings did not have adequate notice. In May 1979 the Maryland State Health department granted the permit for Alpha Ridge. The initial site was built on a compacted base without liners. Residents were informed that Alpha Ridge would operate until the year 2000 without expansion and be converted to a park at the end of its collection phase. BFI Recycling service started in 1989 as part of a Maryland initiative to increase recycling to 20% by 1994. The same year a $52 million project was earmarked to bring the landfill into compliance with Maryland Environmental regulations. By 1990, Alpha Ridge operations cost $75 a ton. In 1992, Howard County proposed to expand the landfill, beyond its original 2.3 million ton capacity. $11 million was budgeted to install cell liners on the remainder of the property to bring capacity up to 6.8 million tons. Citizen opposed the expansion showing documentation from 1978 that the intent was not to expand. Public hearings on expansion in February were emptied by the fire marshal for overcrowding. In 1993, Ecker sought alternatives as groundwater contamination suits were imminent. He proposed a regional trash incinerator facility with Anne Arundel County to provide power to NSA. On 8 June 1994, the County Council voted 5–0 to start transporting trash out of the county. An Anne Arundel transfer site was choose for the USA Waste residential contract and the historic Trinity Church graveyard in Elkridge was selected as a transfer station for the BFI commercial waste contract by creating a solid waste overlay zoning for the site. Alpha ridge remained in operation as hearings were held about lack of notification for the Elkridge waste transfer facility, and concerns about importing out of county residential waste. The redirection of waste at Alpha Ridge lost the $60 per ton commercial waste revenue, but reduced the residential collection expense to $33 a ton. Alpha Ridge remains open as a recycling center and transfer station. The Trinity Church trash transfer location was converted to the Blue Stream Housing development in 2014.

== Environmental ==
The Alpha Ridge site was situated in a section of Marriottsville Maryland that was converting from mainly agricultural use to residential development. In 1987 The State granted permission to dig the landfill within 5 feet from the water table. Yearly water quality surveys were performed only in September 1978 and January 1991. By 1992, 1,600 residents in 300-400 subdivisions drew well water from the Alpha Ridge watershed. Well tests onsite in 1992 revealed contamination from seven paint and degreaser related compounds at eight times the current EPA limits and tetrachloroethene at twenty times the limits. A May 1992 test revealed that the clay lining and bedrock were not adequate to prevent contamination into the groundwater. In January 1993, the County executive claimed he had not been given the results to act upon. In 1993, the county faced multiple contamination issues, as the older Cars Mill landfill was found to have 390 drums of hazardous chemicals dumped on the landfill years after it was closed. In May 1993, Howard County Department of Planning and Zoning director Joeseph Rutter amends the county water service area to include land around the landfill including a new Donald R Reuwer development on the historic Waverly Plantation. The director announced the effort was for safety, not increased housing density around the contaminated site, but joined Reuwer's land development company later.

The 72 acre park was built on landfill property on the opposite side of the Little Patuxent River that flows through the site. A ten-year plan for waste was produced in January 1994, with a suggestion to continue to receive ash from a regional incinerator. In 1994 the park required chemical toilets due to the potential of groundwater contamination. In June 1995 The County council debated providing public water hookups to local residents at no cost, or providing loans for the service. Public Works Director James M. Irvin said it would take at least 18 months to provide. A year later resident were informed they would have to pay $4200 each to connect to clean water and would pay the county in 10 years of installments at 6% interest.

In 1995 Reston based SCS Engineers proposed a $15 million project to install a 68-acre 40 mm (2 in) thick plastic membrane over the landfill to minimize surface water from leaching. A series of 150-foot deep wells surrounding the landfill were designed to pump and "evaporate" pollutants into the air, then dump the treated water into the Little Patuxent River. Methane gas buildups would be vented to a burning facility. An additional $20 million was budgeted to perform similar remediation at Carr's Mill and New Cut landfills funded by an additional $120 trash tax implemented by Charles I. Ecker. In January 1997, Ecker announced that the plastic cap to keep rainwater out would be reduced to 43 acres (17 ha), excluding sloped surfaces. Three days later he flew toxicologist Laura Green in to discuss the cancer rates of the community, explaining that estrogen, sunlight, alcohol, asbestos, cigarettes and radiation are also contributors to cancer. Public water was made available for 280 homes in July 1997, with the Council excluding homes built after 1993, stating purchasers should have known the issues with contamination by then.

== Post collection ==
In 1994, Interstate commerce laws were enforced removing local municipalities monopolies on commercial dumping locations. Commercial operators were able to choose cheaper sites other than Alpha Ridge which charged up to $60 a ton. The County lost a dedicated source of income, leaving a liability. After dumping operations discontinued at Alpha Ridge, Howard County chose to export solid waste by an Anne Arundel County train terminal in Annapolis Junction, Maryland to the privately run King George County Landfill in Virginia. Both sites were developed by Blake Van Leer II and were the first waste on rail facilities in Maryland and Virginia.

Howard County has adapted a number of uses to capitalize on the long term liability of managing a landfill site. The County did not rename the landfill as a park for residential development marketing like the Carr's Mill Landfill site, but it did lay out over a dozen unusable dirt streets across the site to camouflage its use on street maps.

An onsite metal recycling program was initiated requiring contractors to provide daily deposits of fill-cover to the site.

== See also ==
- Shipley House
