= Rogers Avenue =

Rogers Avenue may refer to:

- Rogers Avenue (Baltimore)
  - Rogers Avenue (Metro Subway station), named for Rogers Avenue in Baltimore
- Rogers Avenue (Brooklyn); a former railway known as the Rogers Avenue Line had its name
- Rogers Avenue (Chicago)
- Rogers Avenue (Ellicott City, Maryland)
- Rogers Avenue (Fort Smith, Arkansas), the city is the home of Northside High School and Southside High School, who play an annual football game called the Battle of Rogers Avenue
