= Athol Manor =

Historic slave manor and rectory in Columbia, Maryland, US

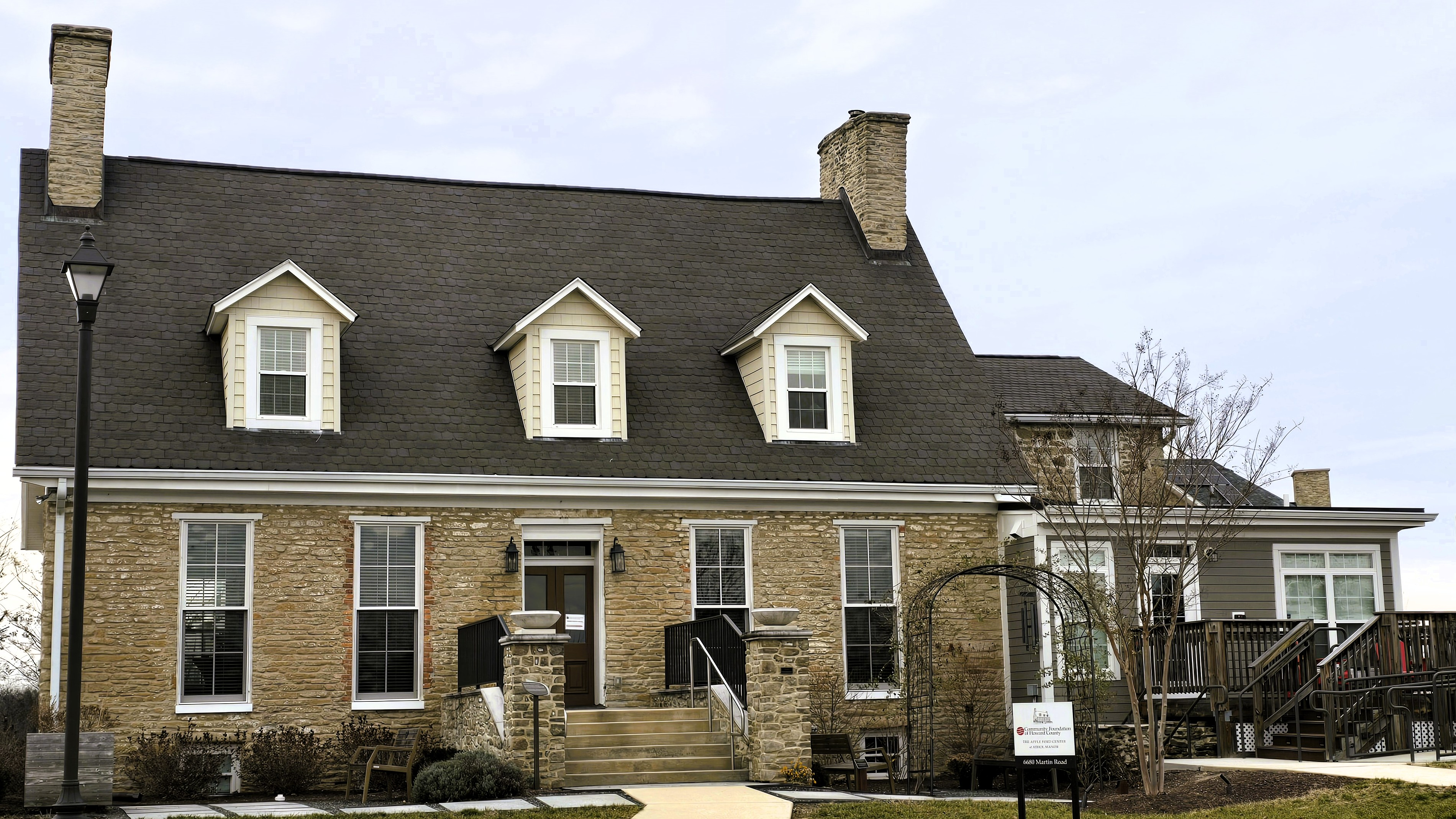
- Athol Manor in December 2015

- Location within Maryland
- 39°11′16″N 76°52′16″W
- Location: 6680 Martin Road Columbia, Maryland

History
- Built: 1740

Site notes
- Area: 2.332 acres (0.944 ha)
- Architectural style: Georgian Architecture
- Governing body: Private

Athol is a historic slave manor and rectory located in Columbia (Simpsonville), Howard County, Maryland, U.S.

== History ==
Athol Manor was built as the neighboring rectory of the Christ Church Guilford, which was built on the site of a 1711 burned church which was rebuilt. Edmund Lord Bishop of London sent Viscount of Oxenford, James MacGill to administer a chapel of ease in Queen Caroline Parish in Anne Arundel County. (later broke off to become Howard County.) On August 17, 1732, King Charles granted 600 acres (240 ha) to James MacGill to form a new Church of England in the Maryland Colony. The patent was titled "Athol" after MacGill's home in Scotland. The title named the county "Winkepin", a reference to the future Wincopin plantation. "Williams Lot", "Scantlings Lot", and "Brown's Hopyard" were combined into a new 875-acre (354 ha) patent named "Athole Enlarged" on September 29, 1763. MacGill brought laborers from Scotland and local slaves to construct the granite building where he raised eleven children with his wife Sarah Hilleary. Construction on Athole started in 1732, and finished by 1740. A side addition was built in 1768. A steep roof and door size windows were built to minimize taxes to Britain on certain features. A square cupola was added, and later removed due to deterioration. A conservatory was constructed in the 1980s.

In 1776, the American Revolutionary War caused the cutoff from the Church of England. MacGill accumulated a total of 837 acres (339 ha) to his estate before he died in 1779 and was buried on the estate. The property was contested among the MacGill heirs until sold to John Hathaway in 1821 for $3,944.50. In 1866 the house was the residence of Richard Gambrill MacGill. Subsequent owners included Nehemiah Moxley Sr, whose descendants would serve as county commissioner and subdivider of large tracts of Howard County to form the Columbia development. In 1927, the estate was conveyed by James Clark to local newspaper magnate Paul Griffith Stromberg. From 1927 to 1946 the Melvin Coar family occupied the house who added electricity, plumbing and central heating. Tom and Edwina Dike maintained the house until 1986 as Columbia was built on subdivisions of the land.

The property located adjacent to Route 29, has been subdivided down to 147 acres (59 ha) in 1863, 14 acres (5.7 ha) in 1976, and just 2.3 acres (0.93 ha) surrounding the site today. The site with a stone marker labeled Athol 1730, was purchased by the Rouse Company. Two Gravesites located on the estate were moved for residential development, gravesites to the east had tombstones removed without bodies re-interred before development. A 1997 historical survey recommending the property for National Historic Register status for significant contributions to history, Architecture and artistic merit. The recommendation was denied by the office of preservation services. All but one pre-colonial structures in the limits of the planned community of Columbia have been denied historic status. Martin Road Park was formed out of a small tract adjacent to the manor home.

== See also ==
- List of Howard County properties in the Maryland Historical Trust
- Simpsonville, Maryland
- Freetown, Maryland
