= Nissel =

Nissel is a surname. Notable people with the surname include:

- Angela Nissel (born 1978), American writer
- Muriel Nissel (1921–2010), British statistician and civil servant
- Siegmund Nissel (1922-2008), Austrian-born British violinist
- J. Thomas Nissel (born 1931), American lawyer and judge
