= Alpha, Maryland =

Unincorporated community in Maryland, U.S.

Coordinates: 39°19′16″N 76°55′40″W

Alpha is an unincorporated community in Howard County, Maryland, United States. A postal office operated from 27 February 1884 to 15 June 1915.

Alpha is the site of the Mt. View Cemetery. The town between Marriottsville, and Sykesville is not recognized by the name, but is dominated by the controversial Alpha Ridge Landfill. It was home to one of Howard County's earliest bicycle clubs active in 1891.
