= Brookeville Woolen Mill and House =

Historic mill and house in Maryland, United States

- U.S. National Register of Historic Places
- U.S. Historic district
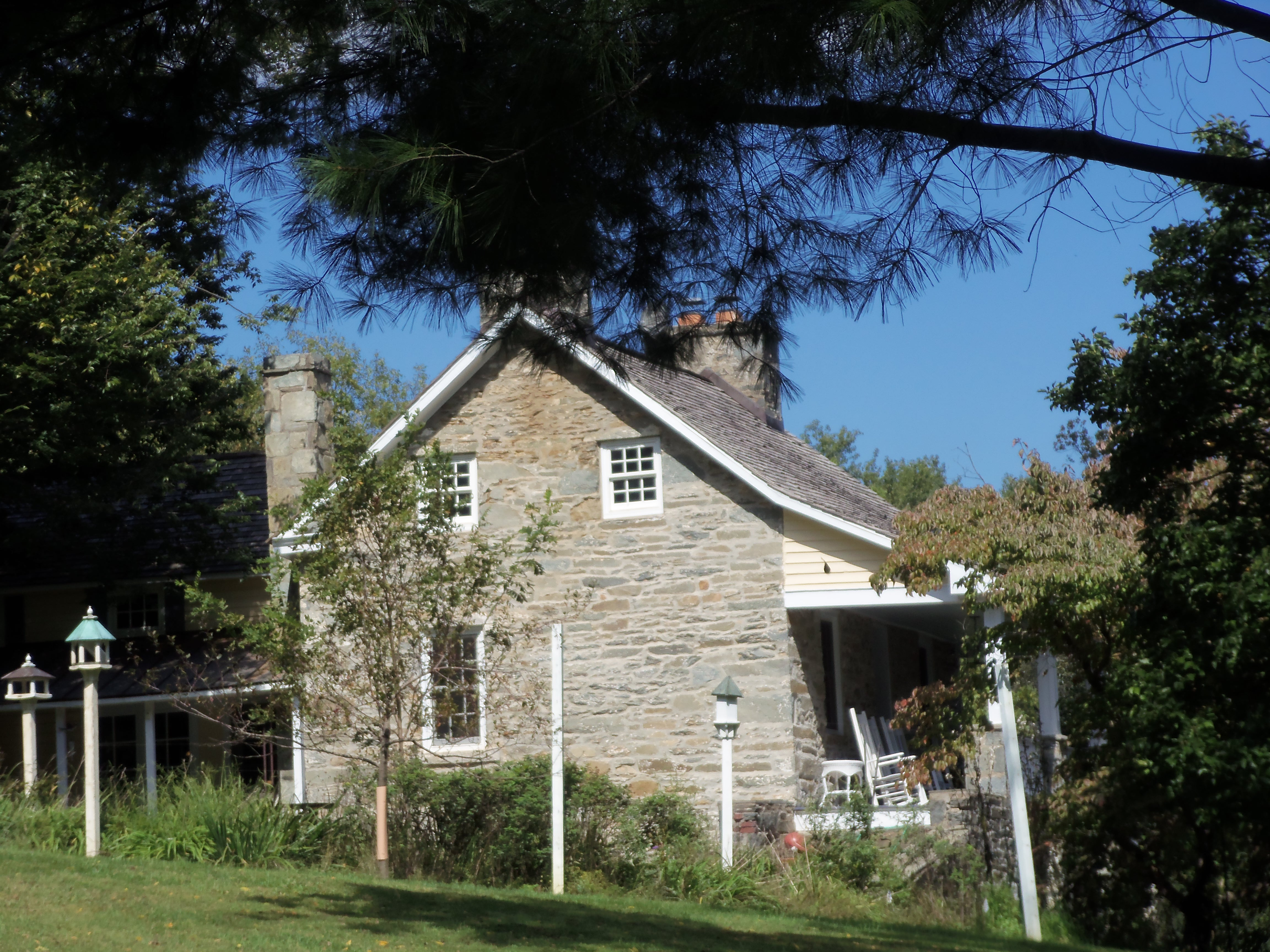
- House in September 2012

- Location within Maryland Location within the United States
- Nearest city: 1901 Brighton Dam Road, Brookeville, Maryland
- Coordinates: 39°11′51″N 77°2′53″W
- Area: 14 acres (5.7 ha)
- Built: 1783
- NRHP reference No.: 78001472
- Added to NRHP: September 6, 1978

The Brookeville Woolen Mill and House is a historic home and woolen mill located in Brookeville, Maryland, in Montgomery County. The complex consists of two buildings constructed of rubble masonry. The woolen mill is a small one-story structure. South of the mill are two stone worker's houses, one of which is a three-by-two-bay, 1 1/2-story stone house. The house was most likely constructed prior to 1783. The complex may have been built by the Riggs family, who later became well-known bankers and merchants in Washington, D.C.

It was listed on the National Register of Historic Places in 1978.
