= Forest View (Howard County, Maryland) =

Historic house in Maryland, United States

- U.S. National Register of Historic Places
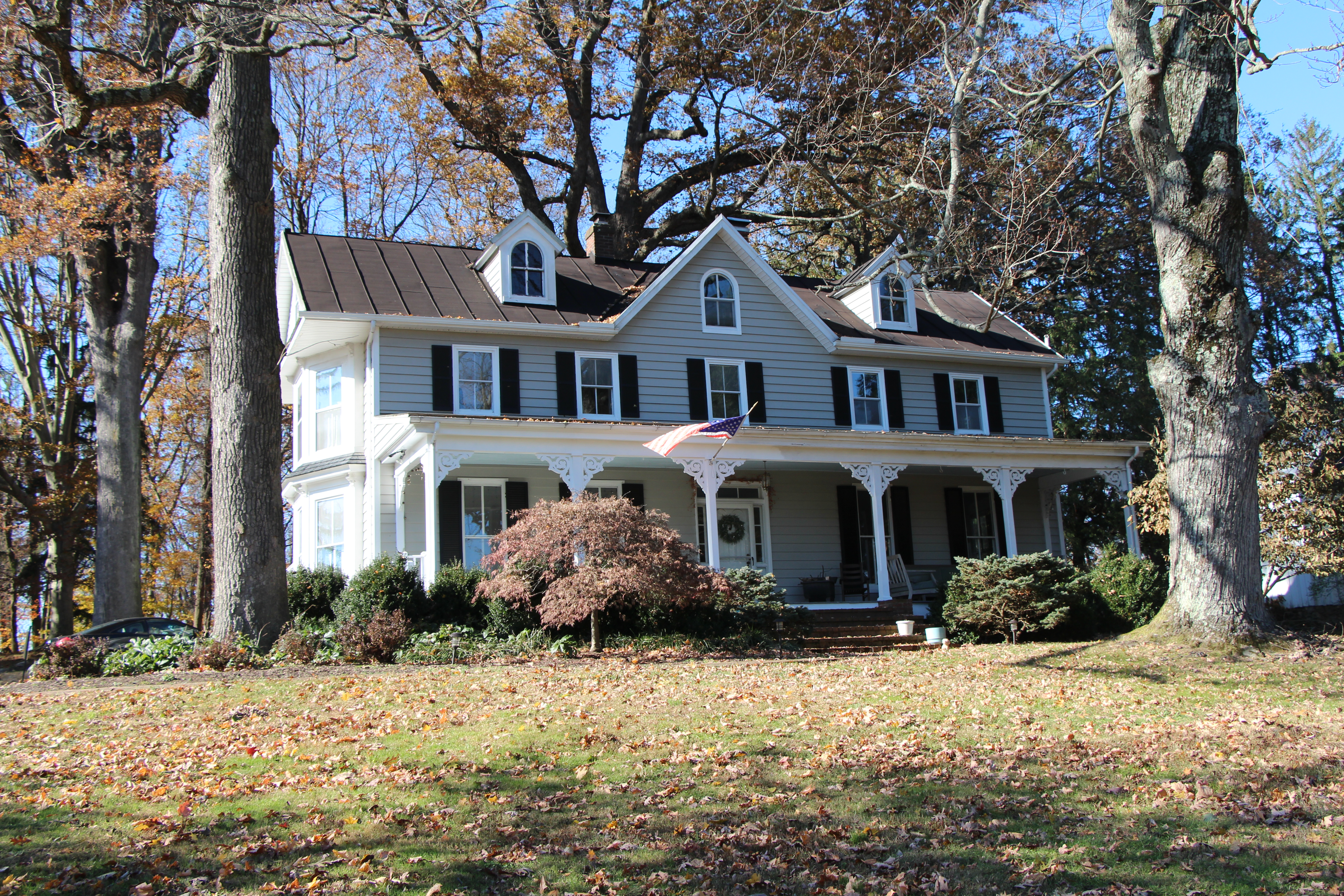

- Location within Maryland Location within the United States
- Location: 1805 Marriottsville Rd.
- Nearest city: Marriottsville, Maryland
- Coordinates: 39°19′17.5″N 76°53′46.8″W
- Built: 1861-1936
- NRHP reference No.: 100001894
- Added to NRHP: December 12, 2017

Forest View is a historic building located near Marriottsville, Howard County, Maryland, United States. The farm on which this house was built was a speculative venture that was begun 1860–1861, which was rare for that time period. In time production at the farm ended and the property was subdivided. Unlike many Howard County farms that suffered the same fate, the house was preserved. It is a 2½-story frame structure with a kitchen wing that extends out the back of the house. The original block was built in 1861, and additions have subsequently been added to the house including a second story over the kitchen wing. The Gothic Revival decorative features were added in the late 19th or early 20th century. The house's final form was realized about 1936. It was listed on the National Register of Historic Places in 2017.
