= UMBC Training Centers =

Technical and professional training programs

Coordinates: 39.25509°N 76.71365°W

University of Maryland, Baltimore County Training Centers
- Type: Public
- Established: 2000
- Location: Baltimore, Maryland; Columbia, Maryland; Augusta, Georgia, United States
- Campus: 6996 Columbia Gateway Drive Columbia, MD 21046
- Website: Official site

UMBC Training Centers is an extension of the University of Maryland, Baltimore County (UMBC) established in 2000 at UMBC's South Campus in Catonsville, Maryland. UMBC Training Centers provides technical and professional training programs remotely and directly at three campuses to individuals, groups, corporations, and government agencies around the country. The school's administrative offices are located at the Columbia campus at the Columbia Gateway Business Park.

The center partners with numerous educational institutions and organizations including the American Council on Education Bowie State University, University of Maryland, Baltimore County (UMBC), University of Maryland, University College (UMUC), and the University System of Maryland (USM).

== Programs ==
- Big Data Analytics
- Cybersecurity
- Engineering
- Human Resources
- Information Technology
- Leadership & Innovation
- Project Management
- Sonography
