= Oak Hall (Columbia, Maryland) =

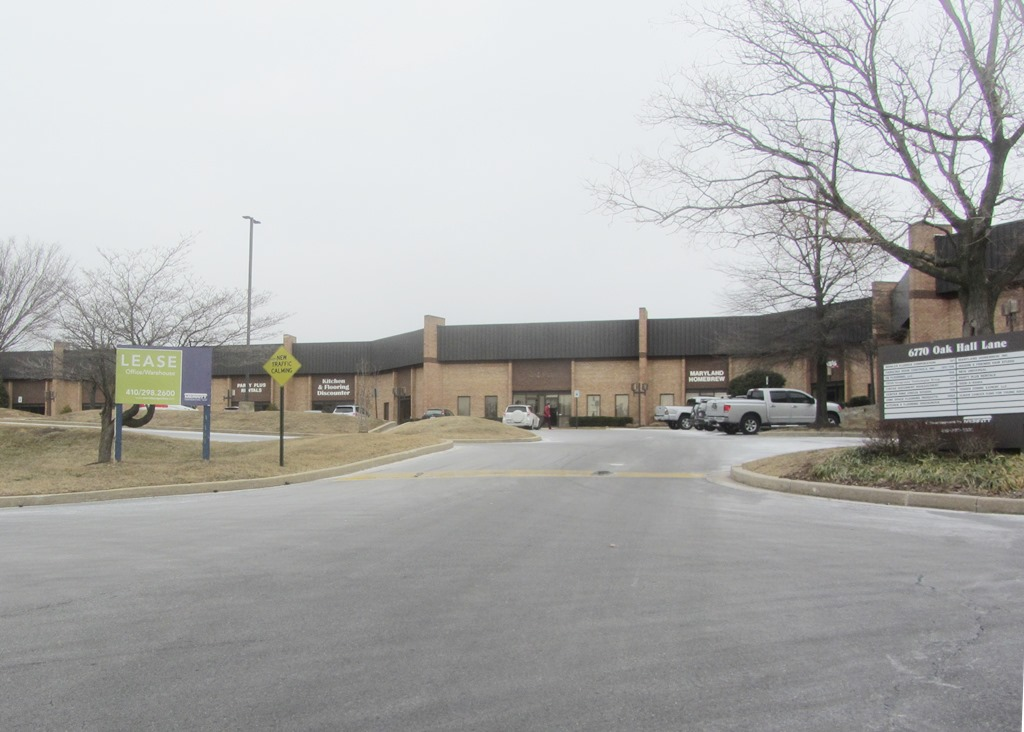
- Oak Hall site - Replaced with a Merritt properties office park

- Location within Maryland
- 39°11′08″N 76°49′20″W
- Location: 6770 Oak Hall Lane, Columbia, Maryland

History
- Built: 1809

Site notes
- Architectural style: Brick

Oak Hall was a historic farm and manor house located in Columbia, Howard County, Maryland. It was occupied by the Dorsey family from the time of construction in 1809 until it was demolished in 1985.

Oak Hall was built by Richard Dorsey in 1809, it was a sister house to the Waveland Manor built by his brother. Both houses were on a land grant originally named New Year's Gift, which contained the Dorsey Family estate Elkhorn c. 1732. Oak Hall had 19 rooms and nine fireplaces. Outbuildings included a large frame barn. The manor was located adjacent to Christ Church Guilford.

The Dorsey family remained Confederate sympathizers through the Civil War, providing more militia than any other family in the state.

Oak Hall remained in good condition throughout its history, but was demolished in November 1985 for commercial development. Oak Hall Lane in Columbia terminates at the former location, and is now called Oak Hall Business Park, named for the place it demolished in traditional Columbia fashion.

== See also ==
- List of Howard County properties in the Maryland Historical Trust
- Christ Church Guilford
