= Simpsonville Mill =

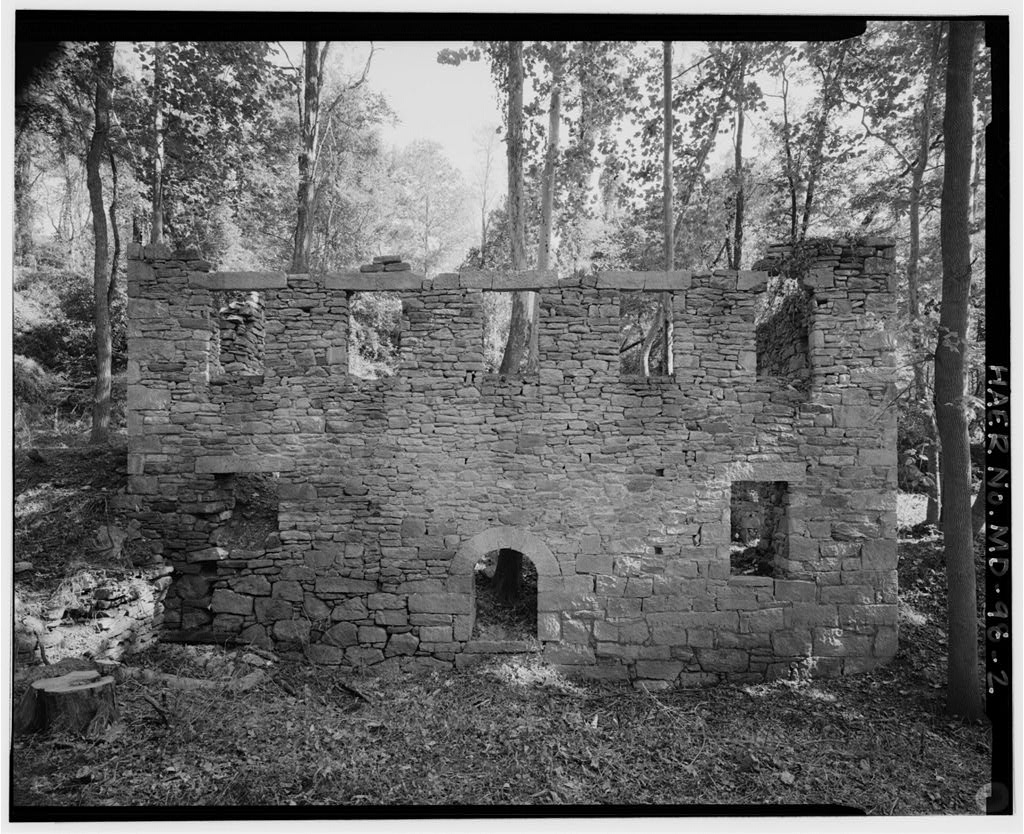
- Interactive map of the Simpsonville Mill area

General information
- Type: Grist Mill
- Location: Cedar Lane, Columbia, Maryland
- Coordinates: 39.18829°N 76.89433°W
- Completed: Mid 1700s

The Simpsonville Mill is a historic pre-colonial mill complex in Simpsonville, Maryland, part of the Columbia, Maryland land development.

Part of the stone mill ruins are located under the Cedar Lane bridge spanning the Middle Patuxent River adjacent to the James and Anne Robinson Nature Center.

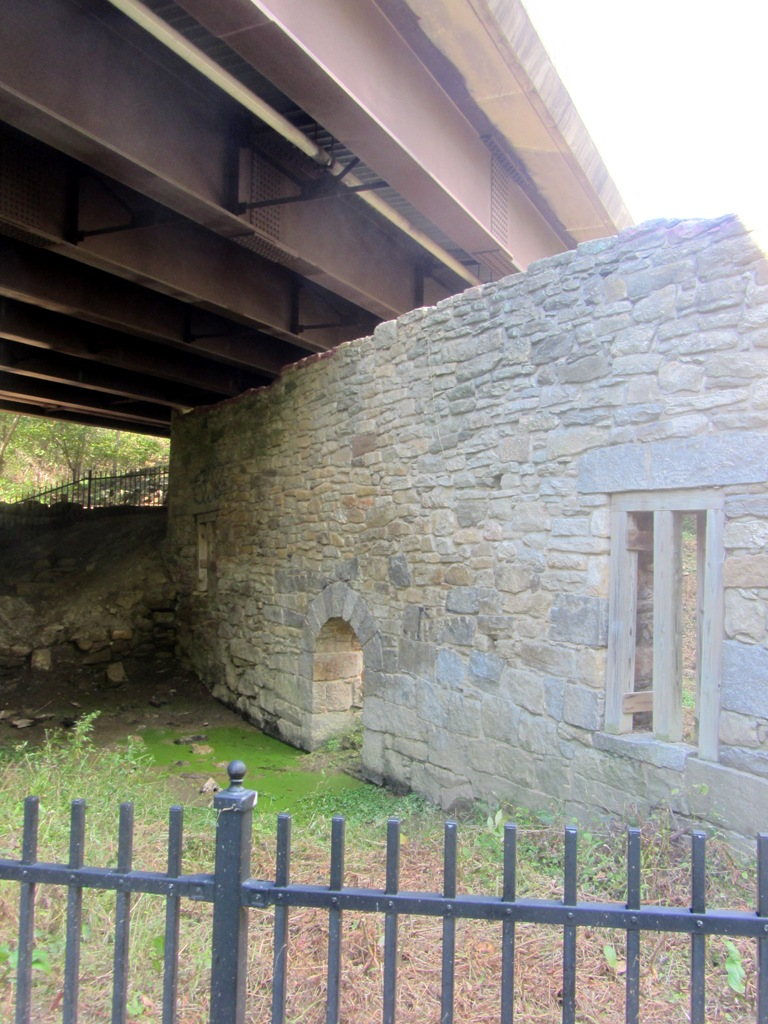
Simpsonville Mill under State Highway Administration bridge to Columbia

== History ==
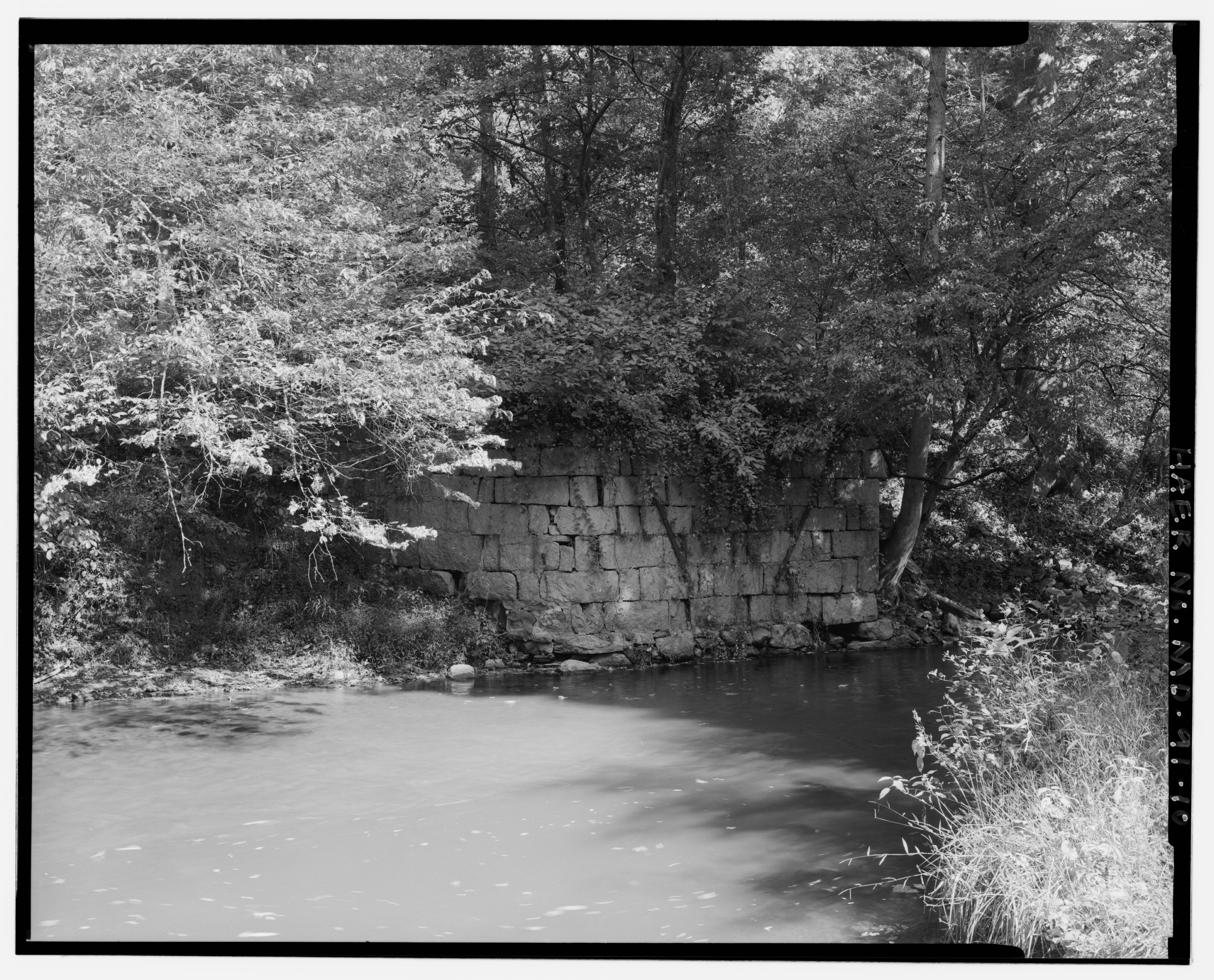
Headgate for the mill

The Mill has been known as Joshua Warfield's mill, Richard Owing's Mill, and Simpsonville Mill. Annapolis-raised John Hobbs Jr. purchased property along the Middle Patuxent River Valley in 1741, selling it to Joshua Dorsey in 1749. In 1768, Joshua Dorsey listed the stone mill in his will. The property was acquired by Vachel Worthington in 1789. Richard Owings purchased 11 acres surrounding the mill in 1796 and expanded the property to 1000 acres. The Owings brothers operated several local mills when Napoleonic Wars caused a brief surge in flour prices, making operations very profitable at $11.00 or more a barrel, but declined shortly afterward. In 1852, Charles Ridgley Simpson bought 215 acres surrounding the mill. Production shifted to wool cloth with six employees manning six spindles, four looms, and two carders. William Simpson inherited the mill after his brother's death in 1854. After the conclusion of the Civil War, William Bradshaw operated the mill from 1865 until his death in 1877. The mill was auctioned off and the Ellicott City Times described the mill at this time as

A large three story woolen factory driven by a new turbine wheel of 25 horsepower. Grist Mill, and Saw Mill, Blacksmith and Wheelwright Shop. A Store Building with eight dwelling houses, A large switzer barn with stabling for twelve horses with all necessary farm buildings 215 acres under cultivation and good fencing

James Simpson brought the mill back to the Simpson family in 1878 who subsequently sold off a small parcel of the property and converted from wool production back to milling. Justice of the Peace Charles R. and Mary Wilson owned the mill from 1904 to 1909. From 1909 to 1934 former Howard County Commissioner William Welling Iglehart purchased the property with his brother John Iglehart. Iglehart operated the building as a sawmill, grist mill and pre-prohibition basement cider mill with production decreasing rapidly by 1915. In 1917, John Iglehart took over. In 1920, a mill fire gutted the building, leaving the stone walls mostly intact. As the Great Depression hit, the Eueka-Maryland Assurance Company took over in 1934 after the Igleharts defaulted on a mortgage. In 1963, Howard Research and Development purchased the property.

Howard Research and Development (Rouse Corporation) purchased the 58.5-acre site during the formation of the Columbia, Maryland development, changing the land to "New Town" zoning which was later changed to R-ED (Residential - Environmental). In 1977, a new bridge was proposed across the Middle Patuxent River at a raised height of 14 feet above water level. A historic inventory was performed in 1979 with little mention of the building's history, noting that it was up to the developer if they chose to submit the property to the national register. In 1993, a state highway project realigned a bridge across the Middle Patuxent to span the mill site. A $350,000 archeological dig was performed, finding a dozen homes, a blacksmith and wheelwright shop including evidence of a post office and other shops. A portion of the land forms the Middle Patuxent Environmental Area. In 1994, the Maryland State Highway Administration announced it would build a bridge over the historic mill with matching stone arches. Project engineer John Murphy said, "It really will be something. It's going to be beautiful".

In 2014, the millsite was placed on the Preserve Howard top ten most endangered list due to delays transferring the property from the State Highway Administration. In 2015, the site ownership was transferred to Howard County, remaining on the endangered list.

== Simpson Mill Historical District ==
The Mill stood at the center of a small milling district that was deemed eligible for three out of four categories for the National Register of Historic Places.

- The heavily modified Hatfield residence is built on a 1755 stone foundation, still resides next to the mill site and stood as the residence of several mill owners including the Igleharts.
- The Johnson site – Eight stone foundations relating to the mill.
- The Robinson House and barn adjacent to the mill was demolished in 2004 to build the James and Anne Robinson Nature Center.
- The Owings-Myerly House – 1847 Granite faced building with 1917 addition. The 142-acre tract was purchased by land developers Richard H. Vogel, William A. Vogel, Frederick D. Vogel and Mary L. Farley, who formed the Vogel Farm Partnership in 1978. The house was acquired by eminent domain in 1982, determined not eligible for historic status. The slave quarters were demolished in 1984 for a new intersection and the main house was demolished in 1992.
- Rock Quarries – Two rock quarries are onsite.
- Owings Cemetery – A half dozen tombs of the Owings Family located on an overgrown portion of a private Cedar Lane residence.
- Water Control – Headrace, floodgate, overflow dam, water gate, overflow channel, wheelpit, wheelpit walls, tailrace, headgate walls.
- Wheelwright Shop – Pre-1860 log cabin structure. Basement filled and cabin moved in 1984 for the Cedar Lane Re-alignment.
