= Atholton, Maryland =

Unincorporated community in Maryland, U.S.

Coordinates: 39°10′54″N 76°52′28″W

Atholton is an unincorporated community in Howard County, Maryland, United States. A postal office operated from May 26, 1897, to November 1900 and again from 1903 to July 1917.

Atholton was founded at the crossroads of Old Columbia Pike, Guilford Road and Clarksville Pike. Atholton takes its name from a 600-acre (240 ha) land grant named "Athole" granted from King Charles to James Macgill August 17, 1732. He built a nearby manor house named "Athol" built between 1732 and 1740. In 1845, Nicolas Worthington freed seventeen of his slaves, and gave them 150 acres (61 ha) of the "Athol enlarged" land which was then called "Freetown". In 1869, the Atholton Colored Church was founded and renamed to the Locust Chapel (Locust United Methodist) between 1871 and 1876.

Atholton was situated one mile north of Simpsonville without well-defined boundaries. By the 1930s, postal service was concentrated at Simpsonville.

In 1962, Edward G Pickett and Walter Shank built the Atholton Village Shopping Center, which was one of the first commercial properties taken over by Columbia Research & Development (Rouse) in 1965. The same year the historic Volkmann home burned down by arson shortly after being purchased for the Holiday Hills Development.

== See also ==
- Atholton High School
- Simpsonville, Maryland
