= East Columbia Business District, Columbia, Maryland =

Coordinates: 39°12′29″N 76°48′46″W

East Columbia Columbia Crossing
- Business District
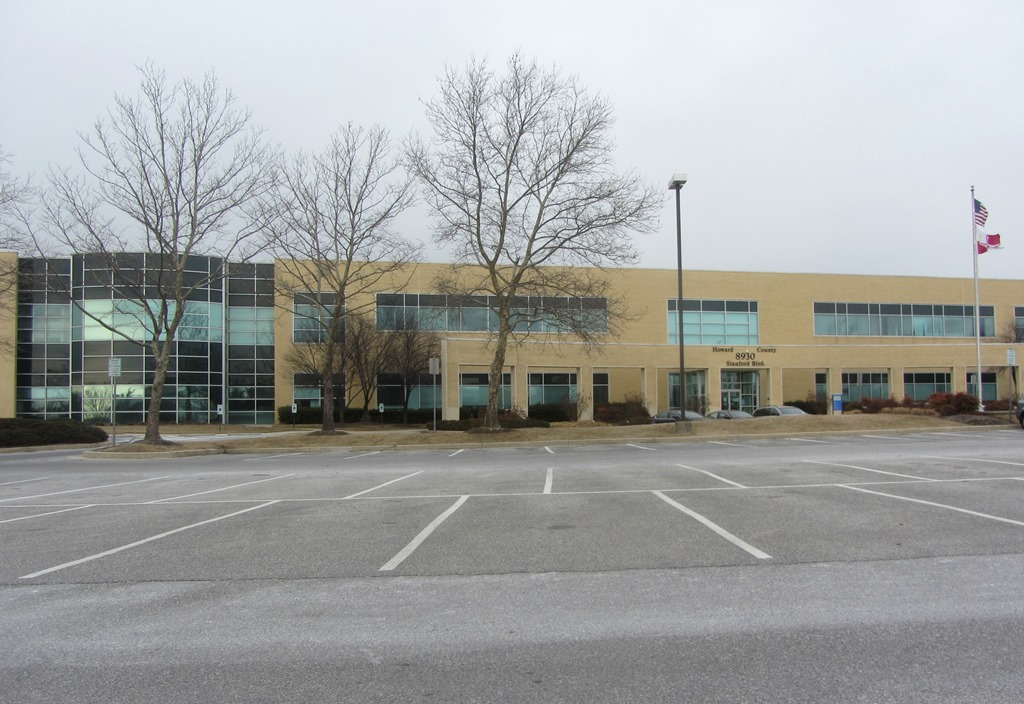
- The Howard County Government Campus in East Columbia
- Nicknames: "Dobbin", "Snowden"
- Interactive map of East Columbia
- Country: United States
- State: Maryland
- City: Columbia
- Named after: Location east of the Town Center

The East Columbia Business District is a section of the planned community of Columbia, Maryland, United States that features a number of large shopping centers and office parks. This district also includes the Columbia Gateway Business Park, which is home to more than 50 companies employing over 17,000 individuals. The business district provides shopping resources for much of Northeastern Howard County. Many locals refer to the area simply as "Dobbin" or "Snowden" due to the major roadways that serve it.

== History ==
During the early 1980s, Maryland Route 175, later known as Rouse Parkway, was extended from the Columbia Town Center to the Maryland Route 108 interchange as a four-lane divided highway. Starting in the 1970s, Columbia's first major business park, the Columbia Gateway Business Park, was developed, eventually comprising 630 acres. Additional major retail developments took place, including Dobbin Center in 1983 and Snowden Square Shopping Center in the early 1990s. In 1997, one of the largest shopping centers, Columbia Crossing, opened on the north side of Route 175 and Dobbin Road. Another large shopping center, Gateway Overlook, opened at the intersection of Routes 175 and 108 in 2007. A Wegmans supermarket opened on McGaw Road in 2012.

== Colleges ==
Numerous educational institutions have satellite campuses located in the Columbia Gateway Business Park:

- Howard Community College
- Johns Hopkins University
- University of Maryland, Baltimore County Training Centers
- University of Phoenix

== Shopping centers ==
- 6181 Old Dobbin Lane
- Columbia Auto Center
- Columbia Crossing I
- Columbia Crossing II
- Dobbin Center
- Snowden Center
- Snowden Square

== Major companies ==
The Columbia Gateway Business Park is home to a number of major companies including:

- Micros
- SAIC
- Motorola
- Nucletron Corp.
- CareFirst BlueCross BlueShield
- Johns Hopkins University
- Magellan Health Services
- Merkle
- Honeywell Technology Solutions
- Sparta, Inc.
- TRW
- MTH Electric Trains
- Wachovia Bank Operations Center
- Kaiser Permanente
- Sun MicroSystems
- CitiFinancial
- Maxim Healthcare
- CoStar Group
- Lifetime Fitness
- Cadmus Communications
- Northrop Grumman
- American Healthways
