= Elkridge Volunteer Fire Department =

Elkridge Volunteer Fire Department, Inc.

Agency overview
- Established: 29 April 1942
- Annual calls: 4672
- Fire chief: Russell Pryor
- EMS level: Paramedic

Facilities and equipment
- Stations: 1
- Engines: 2
- Trucks: 0
- Squads: 1
- Ambulances: 2
- Wildland: 1

Website
- http://elkridgevfd.org/

The Elkridge Volunteer Fire Company is based out of 5700 Rowanberry Drive Elkridge, MD 21075.

== History ==
The Elkridge Volunteer Fire Department, Inc. was started with a meeting on 8 April 1942 with Dr. Charles Nitsch, Lewis C. Toomey, Sr., and John F. O’Malley in attendance. The Fire Department was founded on 29 April 1942. Edward Falter served as first Fire Chief. The first fire truck "Daisy" was assembled by a volunteer force from a junkyard 1934 truck chassis. The effort made national news as the first citizen-made piece of equipment built under the office of civil defense, with an NBC show "Not for Glory."

In 1948 "Station One" was built on Old Washington Road, just north of the "Dead Man's Curve" near Ducketts Lane.

In 2011, plans were unveiled for a new fire station. Explosive call volume growth was cited as the reason for the change followed by press releases that equipment did not fit in the original firehouse. The County spent $1.1 million to purchase a 5-acre site on Bauman Drive and Montgomery Road with a second $500,000 purchase pending to remove a private household. Design and engineering costs of $1.78 million were budgeted. The 33,757 two-story $10–15 million station is funded by state and county grants with a requirement that the Volunteer company self fund the building of a community hall to replace the one that will be closed at the original site. The new site moved away from downtown Elkridge allowing the fire department to service new developments at Rockburn within a six-minute window. The upgraded facility will also allow the purchase of new vehicles without customization.

The 2014 capital budget listed the project as two years behind, funding the reduced amount of $10 million for the capital project. On 8 September 2014, a groundbreaking ceremony was held onsite by County officials Ken Ulman and Courtney Watson.
