= Middle Patuxent Environmental Area =

Wildlife area in Howard County, Maryland

- Location within Maryland
- Location: Central Maryland, United States
- Nearest city: Columbia, Maryland
- Coordinates: 39°12′35″N 76°54′27″W
- Area: 1,021 acres (4.13 km^{2})
- Website: www.middlepatuxent.org

The Middle Patuxent Environmental Area (MPEA) is a 1,021-acre (4.13 km^{2}) wildlife area in Clarksville, Maryland and operated by the Howard County Department of Recreation and Parks. It is located next to the River Hill village in the town of Columbia, Maryland, in the United States. The MPEA was created in 1996 for educational, research, and recreational purposes.

== History ==
The Middle Patuxent River had become silt clogged from farm runoff killing off some fish species habitat. By the 1980s construction activity for the planned community of Columbia caused water quality to reach its lowest levels. In 1991, The Rouse Company proposed the sale of the environmentally sensitive undeveloped land valued at $1.9 million to a Rouse managed trust paid for by Howard County for $2.2 Million. In 1993, students raised $16,000 to save the 1864 Pfieffers Corner schoolhouse from demolition on its five-acre (2.0 ha) Elkridge site. The County Planning director Joseph Rutter, pushed for a rapid purchase of the Rouse property to allow for the school to be relocated to the new MPEA. After the property was purchased, the county choose a separate site in Elkridge for the school relocation.

In 1996, Program Open Space grant money was used to purchase 1,021 acres (4.13 km^{2}) of land from the Rouse related developer of Columbia, Howard Research and Development. After the sale, HRD was still able to count the acreage towards its Columbia open space requirements. $1.76 million was donated by HRD to form the Middle Patuxent Environmental Foundation to manage the park.

In 1999, The Columbia development arm of the Rouse company, Howard Research and Development sold 31 acres or the environmental area to the adjacent W.R. Grace company. In 2014, an adjoining W.R Grace 69-acre (28 ha) parcel zoned planned employment center was combined using a new "community enhancement floating" district overlay developed by the Howard County Department of Planning and Zoning to convert the commercially zoned property into a 180-unit residential development occupying a portion of the original environmental area. The planning board unanimously approved the project which resides in a school district requiring the highest amount of portable classrooms in the county to mitigate overcrowding. Council member Mary Kay Sigaty was quoted saying "The Community Enhanced Floating District" has given the public access to one of the treasures we do have in the county".

In 2007, a study determined that the Patuxent River was "fair to poor biological conditions and only partial support of habitat conditions" from runoff related to development in the Hobbit's Glen area. The Middle Patuxent Environmental Foundation was formed to study the issue in 2015 with a $38,000 Watershed Assistance Grant Program.

The MPEA is home to over 40 species of mammals, and numerous amphibians, reptiles, fishes, butterflies, plants and other wildlife. The MPEA has 5.4 miles (8.7 km) of hiking trails including the 2.4-mile (3.9 km) Wildlife Loop Trail and the 2.3-mile (3.7 km) South Wind Trail. Both trails pass along the Middle Patuxent River.

== See also ==
- Simpsonville Mill
- James and Anne Robinson Nature Center
