= J. Thomas Nissel =

American judge

- Born: December 29, 1930; Baltimore, Maryland
- Died: May 7, 2018 (aged 87); Sykesville, Maryland
- Citizenship: American
- Education: Loyola University, University of Maryland School of Law
- Occupation: Judge
- Known for: Judge in the Circuit Court for Howard County, Maryland
- Predecessor: James Macgill
- Successor: Dennis M. Sweeney
- Political party: Democratic
- Spouse: Irene (1933-2010)
- Parent(s): John J. Nissel Sr., Helen Sullivan
- Relatives: Rev John J Nissel Jr., Helen (Degenhard)

J. Thomas Nissel (December 29, 1930 – May 7, 2018) was the state's attorney for Howard County, Maryland and a judge in Maryland's district and circuit courts.

== Family ==
Nissel was the son of John J. Nissel, a postal supervisor. He and his wife Irene had six children. His son-in-law, Scott Rolle, became the state's attorney and a circuit court judge in Frederick County, Maryland.

== Career ==
Nissel graduated Loyola in 1952, and University of Maryland Law in 1955. From 1957 to 1963, Nissel served as a special attorney for the State's attorney office for seven years handling condemnation cases.

Nissel was appointed a member of the Howard Park advisory board, which was stood up in a contentious effort to purchase land owned by republican commissioner Charles E. Miller as parkland, rather than a hospital development in competition with the Rouse Company's Howard County General Hospital project.

In 1966, Nissel was appointed State's Attorney in March 1966 after Cornelius F. Sybert Jr. vacated the post suddenly. He announced he had no intent to run for any political office in the county. Later that year, he ran for State Senate on a slate with former county commissioner and land developer Norman E. Moxley against James A. Clark Jr. After losing the election, he served as council to the County Commissioners drafting low-income housing regulations for Ellicott City until leaving for private practice in December 1967, being replaced by Parks attorney Thomas L. Lloyd.

In July 1971, Nissel became the administrative head of the Howard and Carroll County district courts. On March 1, 1980, Governor Harry Hughes appointed Nissel to the Circuit Court for Howard County to fill the vacancy created when James Macgill retired. Nissel retired on January 1, 1991. He heard occasional cases as a retired judge as late as 2008.
