= Forestview, Prince Edward Island =

Locality in Prince Edward Island, Canada

Coordinates: 46.723°N 64.280°W

Location of Forestview in Prince Edward Island

Forestview is a locality in the Canadian province of Prince Edward Island.
