= Waverly (Marriottsville, Maryland) =

Historic house in Maryland, United States

- Waverley
- U.S. National Register of Historic Places
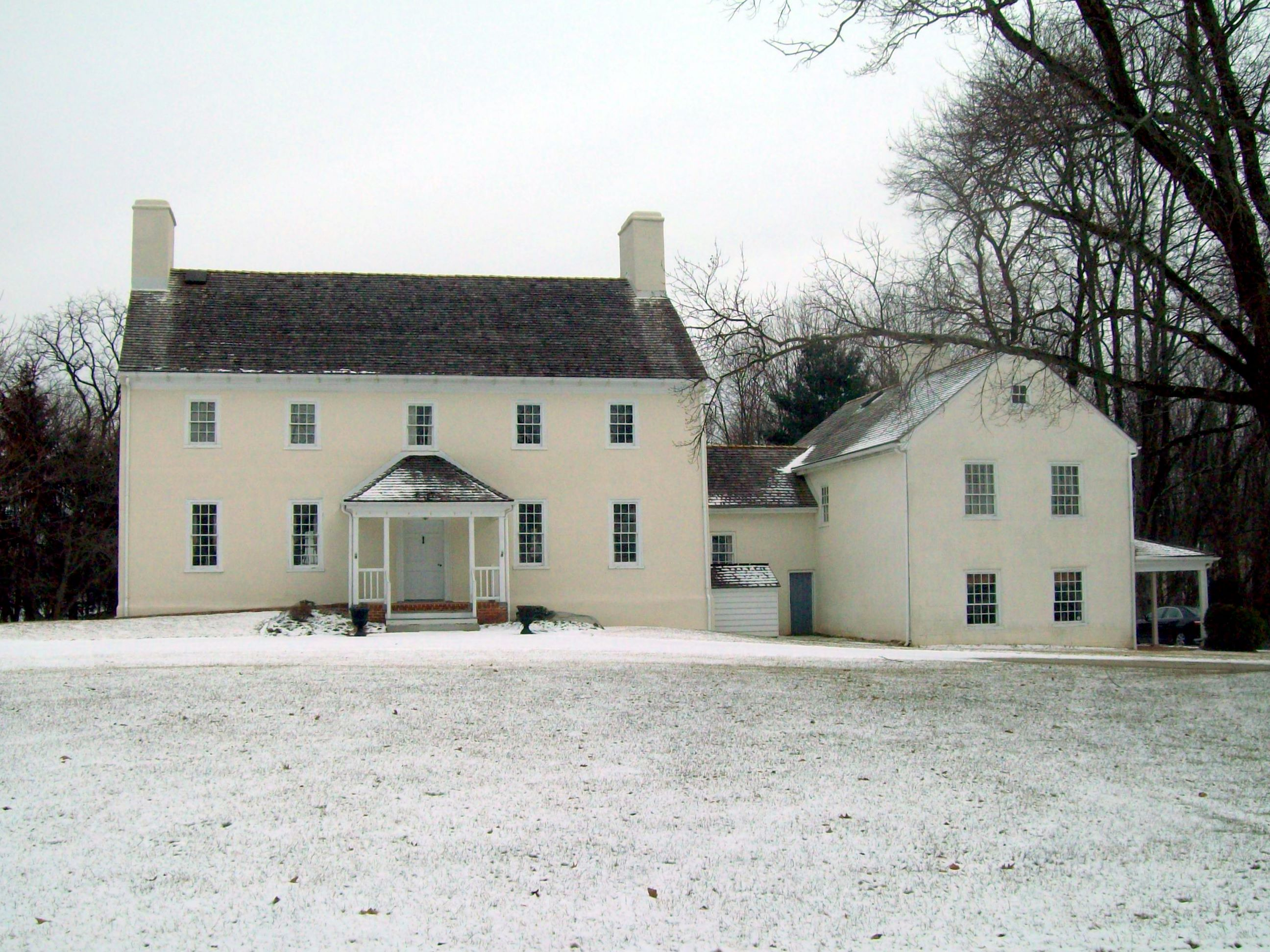
- Waverly, January 2011

- Location within Maryland Location within the United States
- Location: 2319 Waverly Mansion Drive, Marriottsville, Maryland
- Coordinates: 39°18′36″N 76°53′42″W
- Area: 4 acres (1.6 ha)
- Built: 1800
- NRHP reference No.: 74000958
- Added to NRHP: October 18, 1974

Waverly Mansion is a historic home located at Marriottsville in Howard County, Maryland, United States. It was built circa 1756, and is a 2 1/2-story Federal style stone house, covered with stucco, with a hyphen and addition that date to circa 1811. Also on the property are a small 1 1/2-story stone overseer's cottage and a 2-story frame-and-stone barn, and the ruins of a log slave quarter.

Waverly was a property developed on land first patented by Charles Carroll of Carrollton and later part of the 1703 survey "Ranter's Ridge" owned by Captain Thomas Browne. The land was resurveyed in 1726 as "The Mistake." It was purchased by John Dorsey and deeded to his son and daughter-in-law, Nathan and Sophia Dorsey as the next owners.

The property is associated with the Dorsey and Howard families. From the time it was established through the end of the Civil War, Waverly functioned as a plantation where unpaid slave labor was used for farm operations and creation of the wealth and lifestyle afforded to the Dorsey and Howard families. Through deeds, census records and an inventory taken upon the death of George Howard in 1846, information about the enslaved population at Waverly was uncovered. A 1965 article in the Ellicott City Times claimed that 999 slaves worked on the plantation at one time, but research has shown that between 7 and 25 enslaved men, women and children is more accurate. The Ellicott City Times article does not have any primary sources to back up this claim, nor is there an author's name credited to the article.

== History ==
The Dorsey Era

Daniel Carroll sold a parcel of land called "The Mistake" to John Dorsey of Edward in 1750, and Dorsey was apparently acquiring land on which to establish his four sons. On March 30, 1756 his youngest son, Nathan Dorsey, was deeded 700 acres and seven slaves from his father: Peter, Robin, Joo, Ben, Hagar, Pol and Jenny. This deed also included "all the stock of cattle, hoggs [sic], and sheep on the plantation where he now lives." Nathan married Sophia Owings of Baltimore County in 1748, and he likely began developing a plantation at Waverly to support his growing family, as Nathan and Sophia had three children by 1756. Research supports the idea that Nathan built the main block of the mansion circa 1756, which seems reasonable given that this section dates to the eighteenth century. In 1758, Nathan acquired more parcels of land, and by 1764 the acreage had grown from 700 to 875. In 1769, Nathan granted some of the land to his brothers Vachel and Edward.

The Howard Era

Nathan died in 1773 but the property remained in the Dorsey family until 1786, when his brother Edward Dorsey sold the farm to Colonel John Eager Howard of Baltimore. By 1798 the farm was being rented, or operated, by James Frost. Howard also periodically purchased adjacent parcels of land as they became available, beginning in 1793, and by 1817 had almost doubled the size of this farm. Then, in 1811 he gave the farm of 1,313 acres to his second son, George Howard as a wedding present. George had married Prudence Gough Ridgely of "Hampton," in Baltimore County, on 26 December 1811. George and Prudence named the property Waverly after the popular novel by Sir Walter Scott, Waverley. It is not known why the Howards dropped the second 'e' in the naming of their estate. The Howards likely took up residence on the farm shortly after their marriage, although John Eager Howard did not officially deed the property to his son until November 1822, where he hosted events such as partridge hunts. The addition of a hyphen and kitchen wing attached to the south side of the main portion of the house could have been added as early as 1811, if George took up residence then, or sometime shortly after 1822, once he held title to the farm. The Howards raised thirteen children at Waverly including eight sons and five daughters. Of the thirteen, eight survived to adulthood.

At Waverly, George led the life of a country gentleman and farmer. Howard was a slaveholder but paradoxically also agreed with the movement of colonizing free Blacks in Africa. But yet in 1842, Howard created and served as chair to the Maryland Slave-Holders Convention with Charles Carrol, Allen Thomas, CD Warfield, Upton Welsh, Benjamin Howard, Wesley Linthicum, and William H. Worthington as representatives from the Howard District of Anne Arundel County.

Howard was elected a member of the Governor's Council in January 1831 and worked closely with his predecessor Daniel Martin. When Gov. Martin died in July 1831, Howard, as President of the Council, succeeded him, taking the oath of office on 22 July of that year. When Martin's unexpired term ended in January 1832, the Maryland General Assembly elected Howard for a full-year term, receiving 64 of the 82 ballots cast. He advocated the establishment of a State Bank, opposed the doctrine of nullification, was a foe of lotteries, and urged the endowment of Maryland colleges. Howard retired to Waverly following the end of his term. He served as a presidential elector in 1836 and 1840, when he supported the Whig candidate. He died at his home on August 2, 1846, and was probably buried first in the family burial ground at Waverly. His remains were later removed to the Western Cemetery. His body was again removed, but its present resting place is unknown. He is believed to be buried in the Howard family vault at Old Saint Paul's Cemetery in Baltimore, Maryland, where his father John Eager Howard is also buried. There is a tombstone onsite for George Howard's son John Eager Howard, named after his grandfather, dated 1838. The stone was placed against the house, leaving the grave site unmarked and unidentified on the property. It is thought that this stone is the central portion of an obelisk, with the point and pedestal portions having been lost at an earlier time, perhaps when remains were removed from Waverly.

When George died, an inventory of the entire estate was taken, which included 25 enslaved men, women and children: Elias, Jim, Peter, Henry, Jolen, Jake, Bell, Dan, William (Mimah's son), Joshua, Henry, Joe, Mary, Prudence, Lizzie, Frances, Sidney, Sally & child, Mimah & child, Fanny & child, Betsey, and Old Nancy. More research is needed to determine whether any of the enslaved lived in the mansion, or if there were enough slave cabins on the property to accommodate 25 persons. Currently, there is the ruins of one slave cabin on what is now the Waverly Woods Golf Course property. More research is needed to determine whether the enslaved people at Waverly were buried on the grounds, possibly via a ground penetrating radar survey of the property.

After Prudence's death in 1847, she left Waverly in trust to her son, George Jr. A few years later he divided the farm into four parts, for himself and three of his brothers: Dr. Cornelius Howard, Captain Charles Ridgely Howard, and William Waverly Howard. Based on a map in the deed between George Jr. and William, George lived on the parcel that included the mansion. The 1850 slave census shows Charles Howard owning 23 enslaved men, women and children. There are no names on the census, only age and sex. There were four men ages 54, 46, 45 and 19; two females ages 60 and 21; nine girls ages 12, 10, 10, 8, 6, 5, 4, 2, and 1; and eight boys ages 14, 13, 12, 10, 5, 3, 3, and 1.

In 1854, 297.5 acres of the Waverly estate patented as "Delaware Bottom" were sold by William Howard. He described the land containing for a lime quarry, and lime kiln as heavily timbered without improvements and suitable for wheat and corn. During this time, the nearby Roland Maxwell house was used as a slave quarters for Waverly. Another stacked slate building ruins stands behind an office park next to a pond at 10275 Birmingham Way. Noted with little background in county records simply as the Alexander Hassan ruins after the last property purchaser, the building was part of the 600 acre property when Joseph Judick owned the farm, and kept in good condition until Hassan's ownership.

Judick and Brosenne Era

George Howard, Jr. sold the mansion and 300 acres to Joseph Judick, a Baltimore City stock dealer and Peoples Bank of Baltimore director, on 23 November 1858 for $15,462.28 (~$43.5 million in 2024) adding surrounding parcels totaling 600 acres. According to the 1860 census for District 3 of Howard County, MD, Judick owned eleven slaves, and four slave houses are also noted on the census. As in the 1850 census, only age and sex are listed for the enslaved. There was one 30 year old woman; three girls ages 16, 9 and 1; and seven boys ages 14, 12, 11, 7, 5, 3, and 2. It is interesting to note that for the race of each of the enslaved persons they are "M", which stood for Mulatto. At the time, that was the terminology used for persons of a mixed race. Judick was renting a portion of Waverly to Frederick Brosenne, but he continued living on the property until his death in 1881. At that time, Brosenne purchased Waverly from Judick's estate. The property was listed on the National Register of Historic Places in 1974.

Twentieth Century to Present

The Brosenne family continued to own Waverly until 1964, when it was purchased by the Larry Realty Co. and left vacant. Hassan-Glickfield and Larry Reality teamed together to propose the site to become the next Howard County landfill. When Alpha Ridge was selected instead, the site was subdivided from 279 acres down to 25.2 acres, then to 9.8 acres and again to 3.4 acres which were donated in 1975 to the Society for the Preservation of Maryland Antiques (now known as Preservation Maryland). In 1976 The State of Maryland funded $150,000 followed by $150,000 in federal matching money in 1978 for a restoration. Restoration started in June 1979 with a new roof and modern kitchen installation. In 1981 The Maryland Historical trust donated $32,000 (~$93,185 in 2024) to complete the restoration, using Columbia landscape architect Robert Shaw. Historic Waverly, Inc. was formed in 1985 to operate the facility for meetings and receptions. In 1988 Howard County conducted paid Golf Resources Associates to review land for golf course installations. The consultant recommended Larry Realty property with expansion to the east for a low cost facility. The Estate property was sold to Howard County in 1989 for $450,000.

In 1991, 682 acres of the original estate was developed as Waverly Woods. A 932 home development by Donald R Reuwer Jr's company Land Design and Development.

Reuwer, with three Howard County landowners, created the concept for Waverly Woods in the early 1980s. The landowners, who had been Reuwer's clients, each held large tracts of family land, nearly half of which had been deeded since the 1700s.

Today, Waverly is owned and managed by the Howard County Department of Recreation and Parks for weddings, special events, paranormal investigations and interpretive history events, scout programs, school groups, and living history summer camps.

== Gallery ==
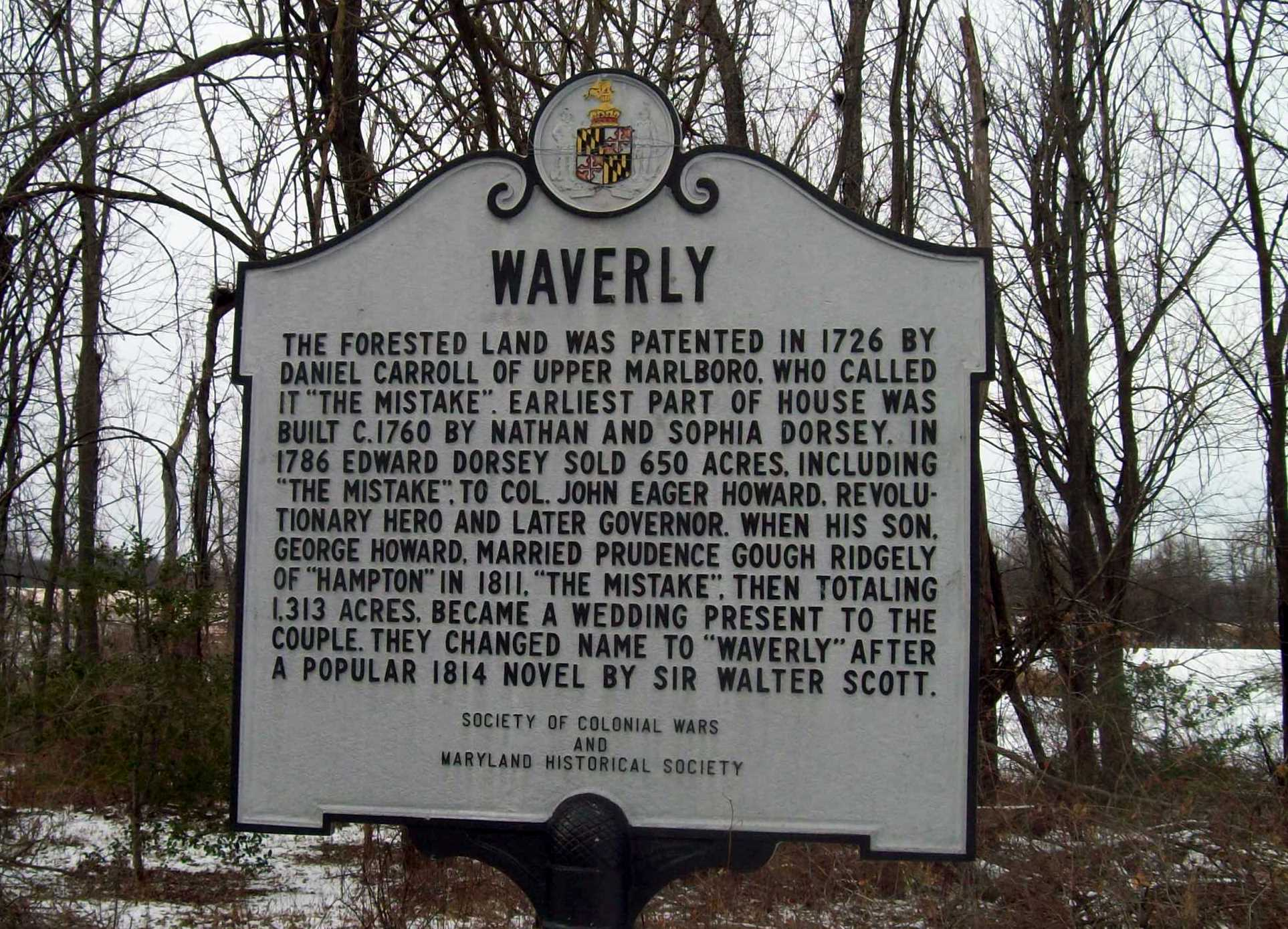
Waverly Historic Marker, January 2011

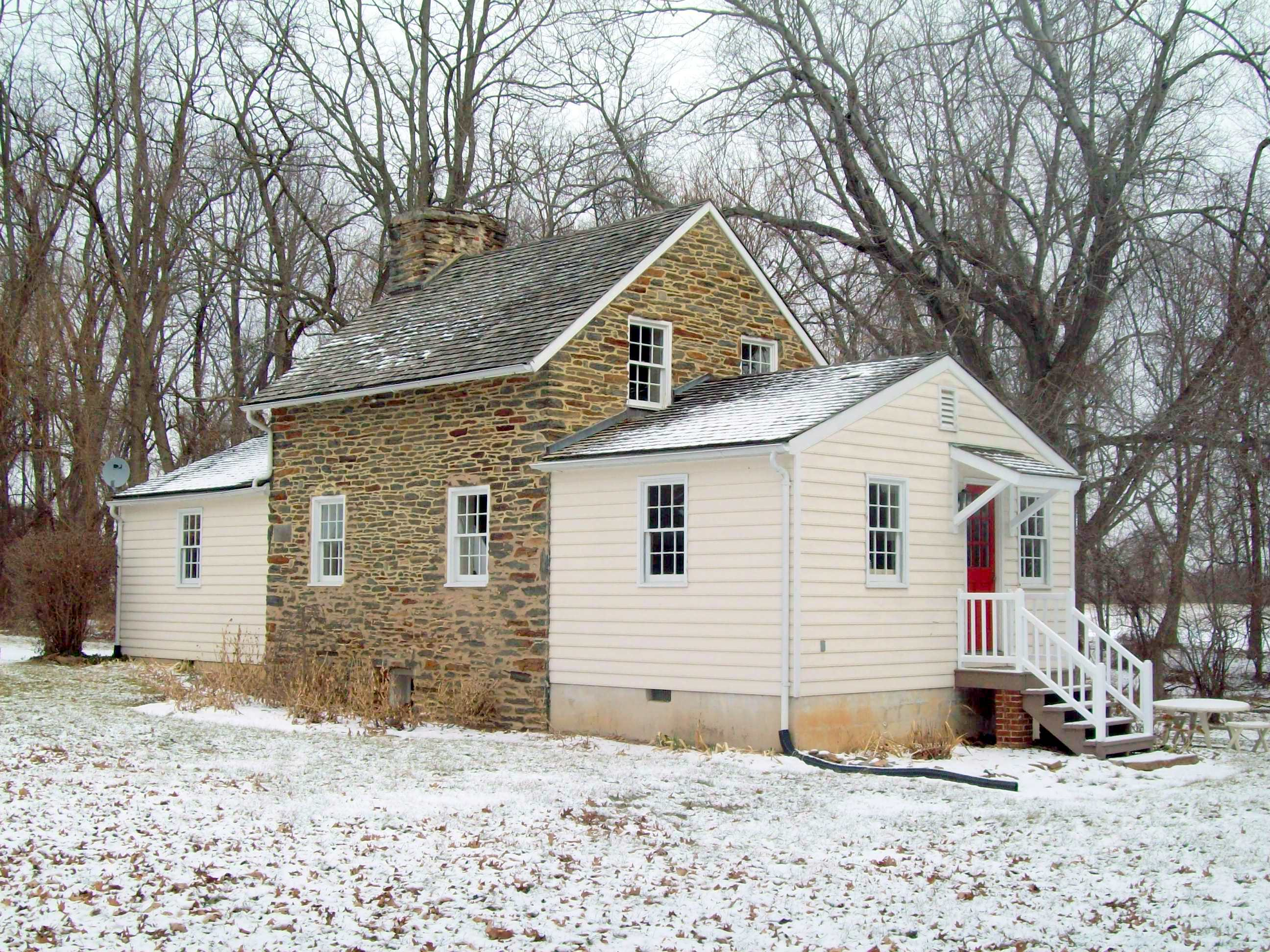
Waverly Overseer's House, January 2011

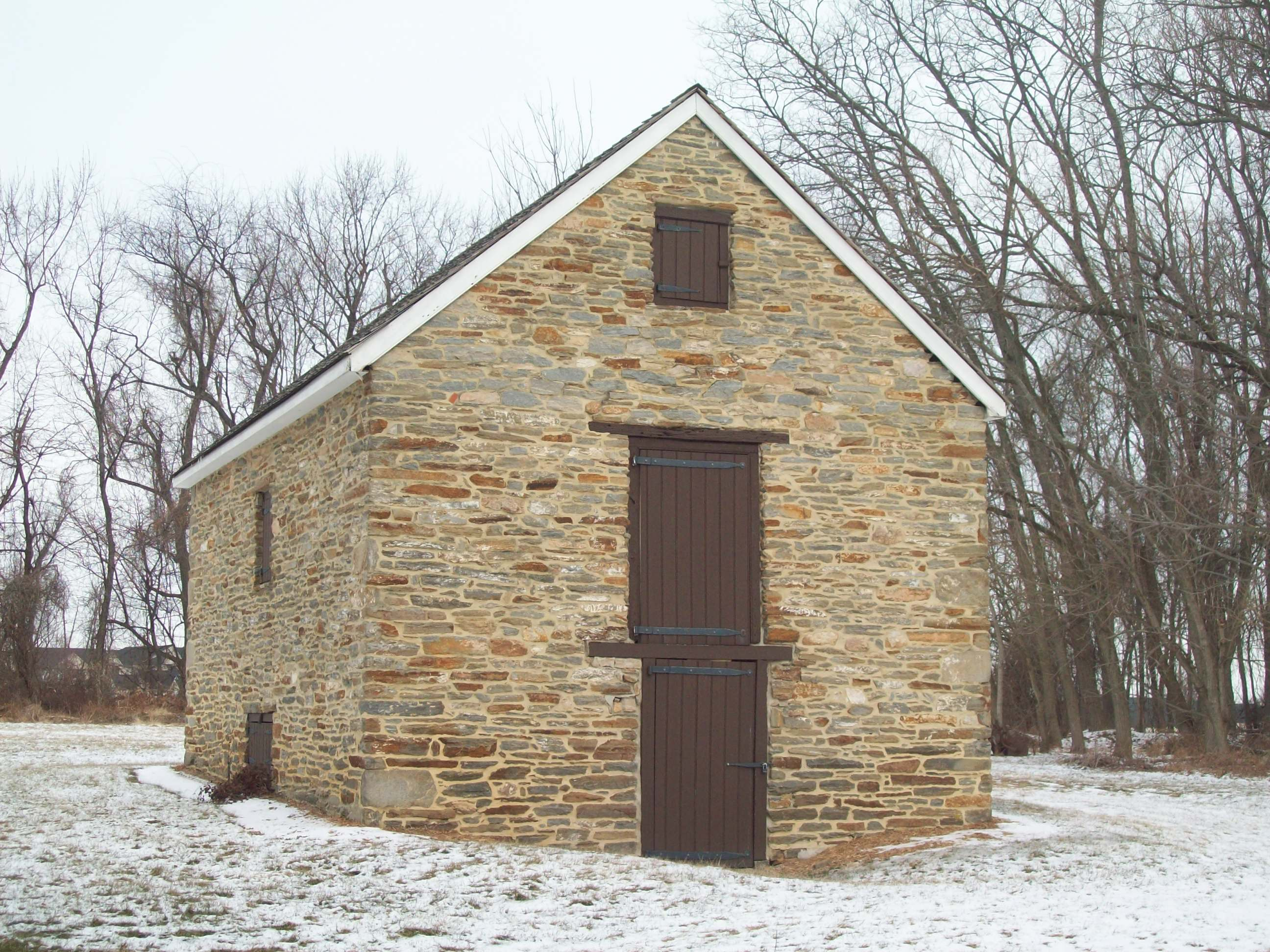
Waverly Dairy, January 2011

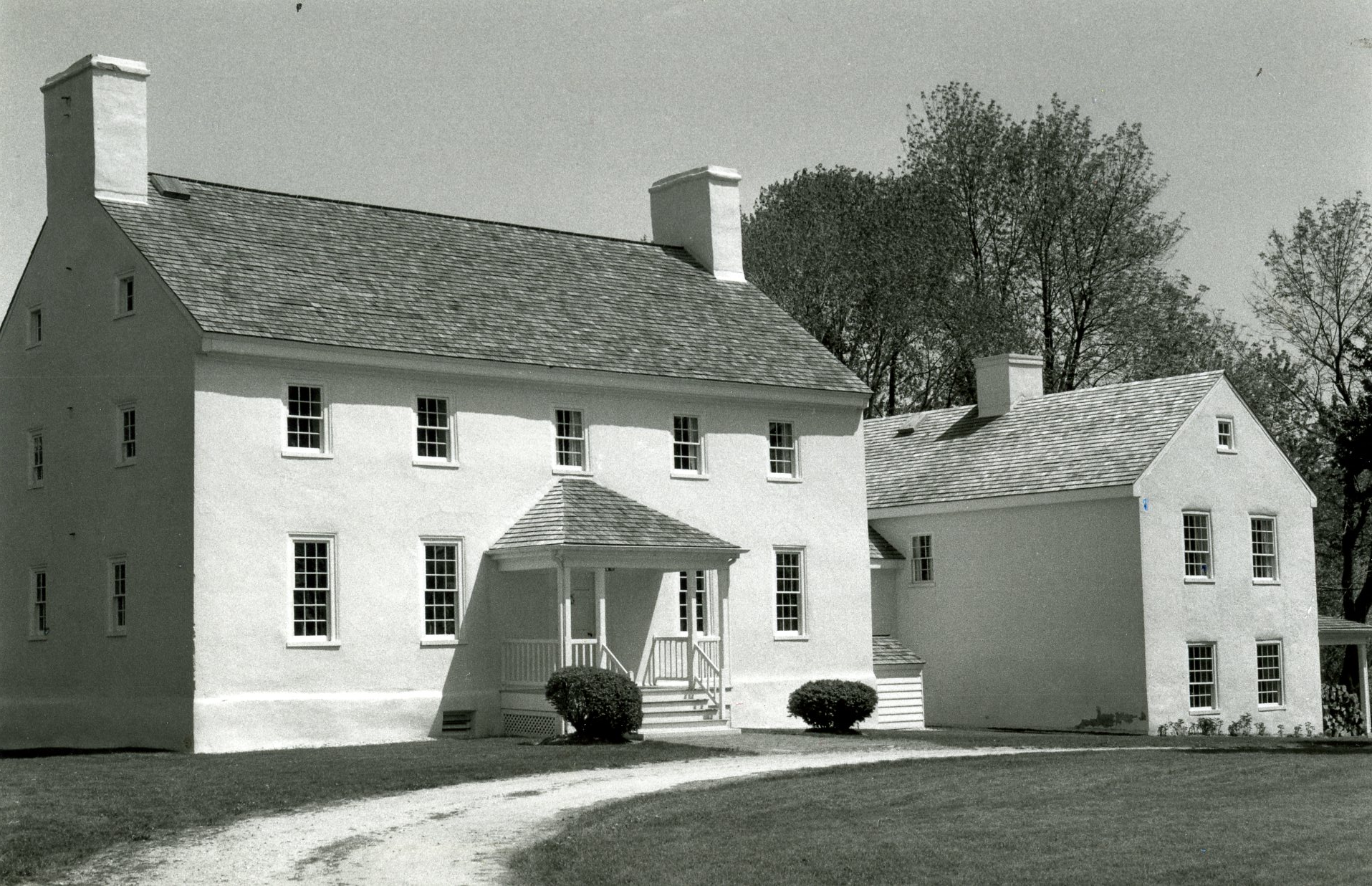

== See also ==
- List of Howard County properties in the Maryland Historical Trust
