= Christ Church Guilford =

Historic church in Maryland, US

- U.S. National Register of Historic Places
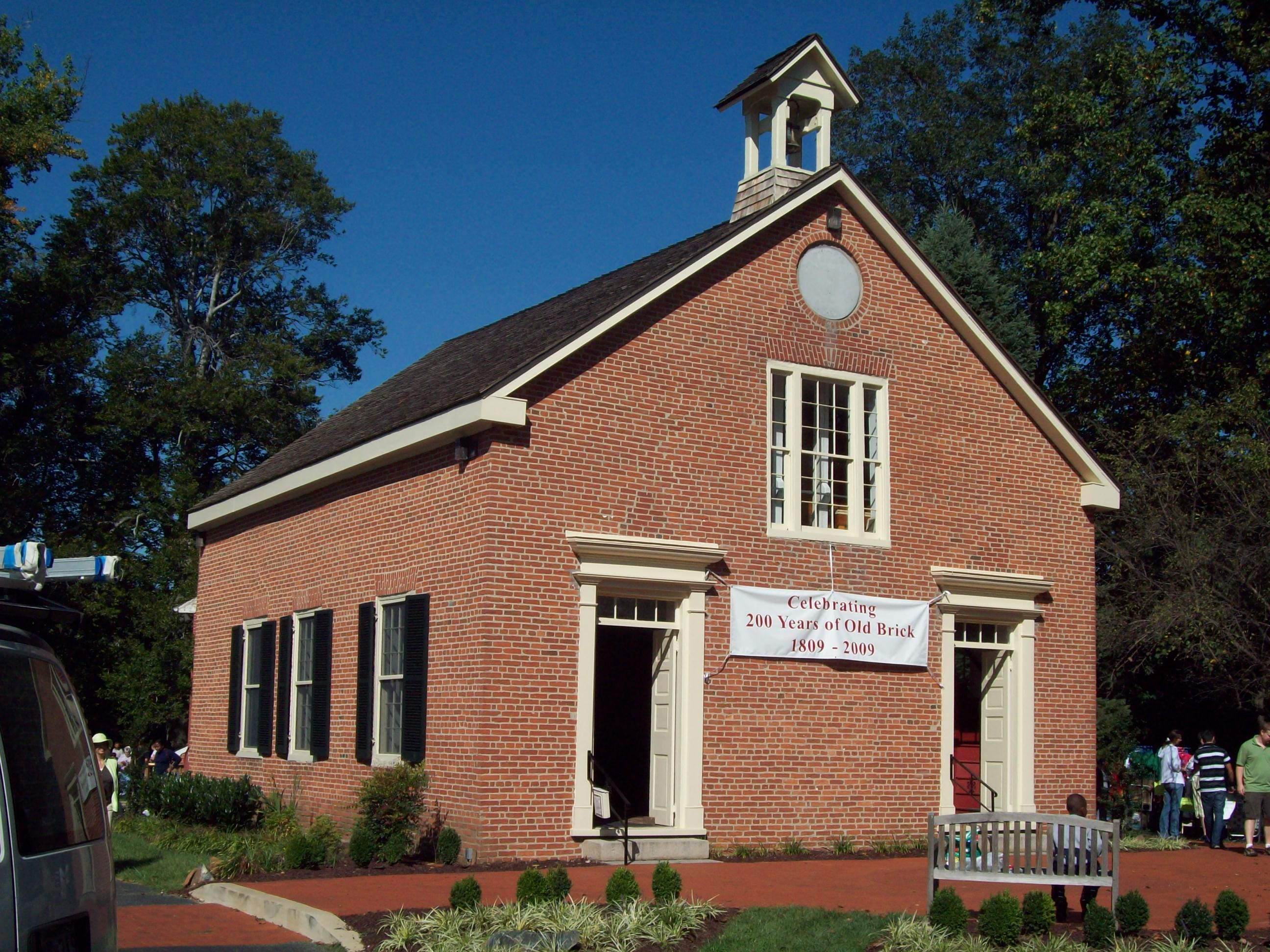
- Christ Church Guilford, September 2009

- Location within Maryland Location within the United States
- Location: North of Guilford at 6800 Oakland Mills Rd., Guilford, Maryland
- Coordinates: 39°11′4″N 76°49′41″W
- Area: 2 acres (0.81 ha)
- Built: 1809
- Architectural style: Georgian
- NRHP reference No.: 78001469
- Added to NRHP: January 30, 1978

The Christ Church Guilford, historically known as the "Old Brick Church," is an historic Episcopal church located about one mile from Guilford, now part of Columbia, in Howard County, Maryland. The small Georgian church was completed in 1809. It was constructed of handmade brick laid in English garden wall brick bond with unmarked joints.

The oldest artifact used by the church is a bible published in 1701 provided by Queen Anne. The original church was established in 1727 as Queen Caroline Parish Church. Trinity Church (Elkridge, Maryland), grew out of Christ Church. The structure replaced a ca1711 log frame building and is the second church building to be built on the 2-acre (0.81 ha) plot deeded to the parish in 1738 by Caleb Dorsey. It is the oldest church building still in use in Howard County.

== Architecture ==
The brick church has a steep gabled roof and is laid in English garden wall brick bond. The structure, two bays wide and three bays deep, faces east with twin entrance doors in the north and south bays. Each bay is rectangular, surmounted by a Federal-style transom and reached by two stone steps. The nave windows are rectangular, holding twelve-over-twelve lites and, decorated with splayed brick flat arched lintels. The interior contains a gallery which extends around three sides of the church.

== History ==
The Christ Church was funded by a parishioner poll tax on tobacco at Elkridge Landing, paying church and sheriff expenses. During the early 1800s the Episcopal Church in Maryland grew very slowly. The American Revolutionary War created tremendous conflicts within the Episcopal Church in the colonies. The clergy, who had been ordained in England, had taken an oath of allegiance to the king. This conflicted with their Oath of Fidelity required by the local assembly. Some clergy returned to England and others simply stopped preaching. After the end of the Revolutionary War the Church of England, the Episcopal Church's parent church, was disestablished as the state religion. Having lost its official government support, the church was low on funds, and few new churches were built.

In 1789, Anglican congregations in nine states adopted The Protestant Episcopal Church as their name and was formally separated from the Church of England. The American Episcopal church was incorporated as “the first Anglican Province outside the British Isles.” Churches that were built during the period of time after the founding of the American church were usually of an economical design. In 1809, the Christ Church was one of the first Episcopal churches constructed in the state after the Revolution. Judge Henry Ridgely oversaw the construction of the brick structure. The only architecturally sophisticated feature is the three-part window over the entrances. In the interior, the paneled gallery is a simple and direct interpretation of much larger churches built during the 18th century in major Episcopal cities like Philadelphia and London.

== Pastors ==
The Reverend James MacGill was chosen in 1728 as Christ Church's first full-time rector. MacGill was a native of Perth, Scotland who served in the church for 50 years., living in nearby Athol Manor. The Rev Thomas John Claggett was rector from 1781 to 1782; he became the first Bishop of Maryland in 1792, and was the first Episcopal bishop consecrated in America. In 1806 Rev Oliver Norris was appointed director. In 1830 Rev Billop was appointed rector.

== Historical significance ==
The structure was listed on the National Register of Historic Places in 1978.

== See also ==
- List of Howard County properties in the Maryland Historical Trust
- List of post 1692 Anglican parishes in the Province of Maryland
- Oak Hall (Columbia, Maryland)

== Gallery ==
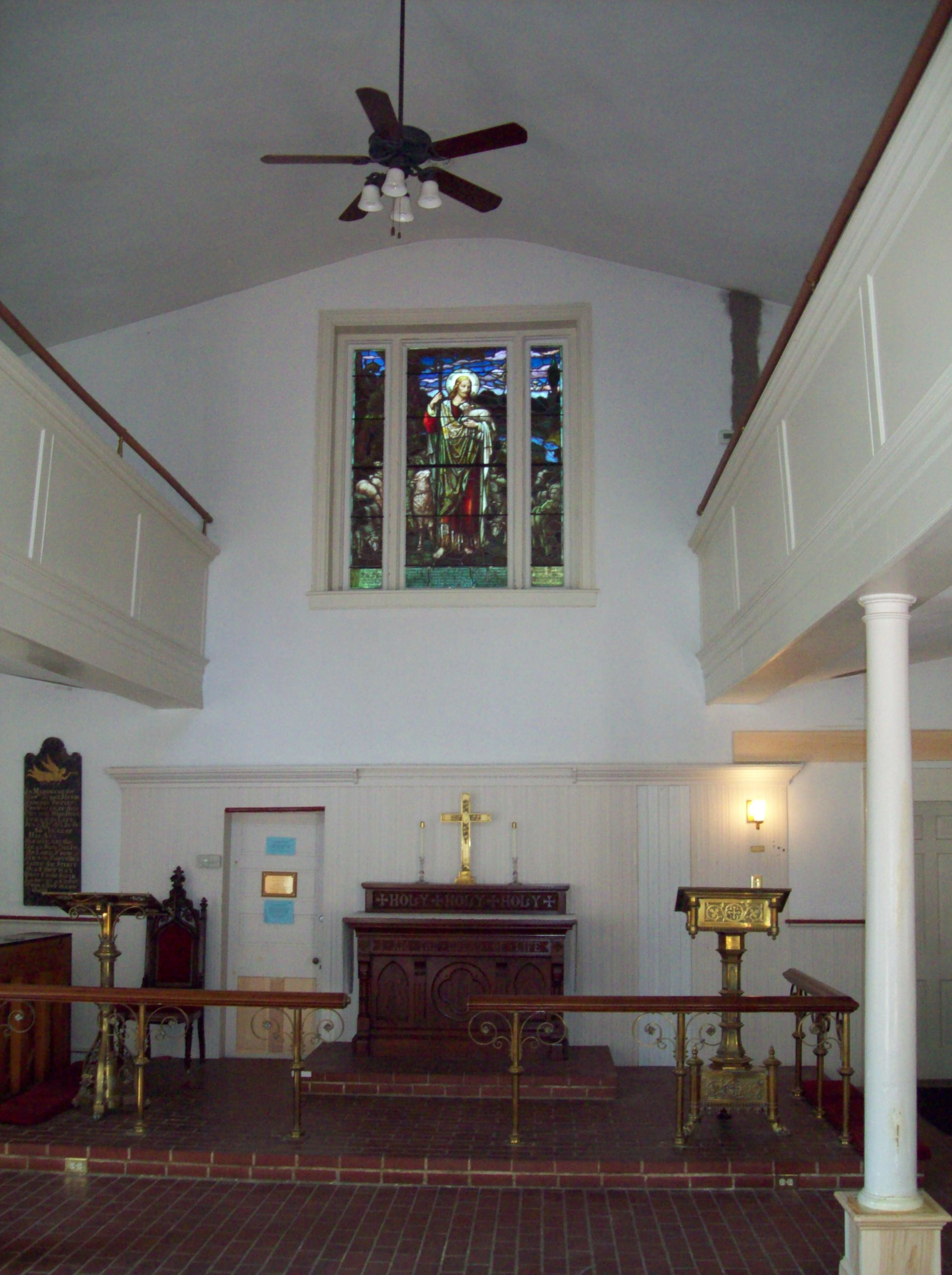
Christ Church Guilford Interior, September 2009

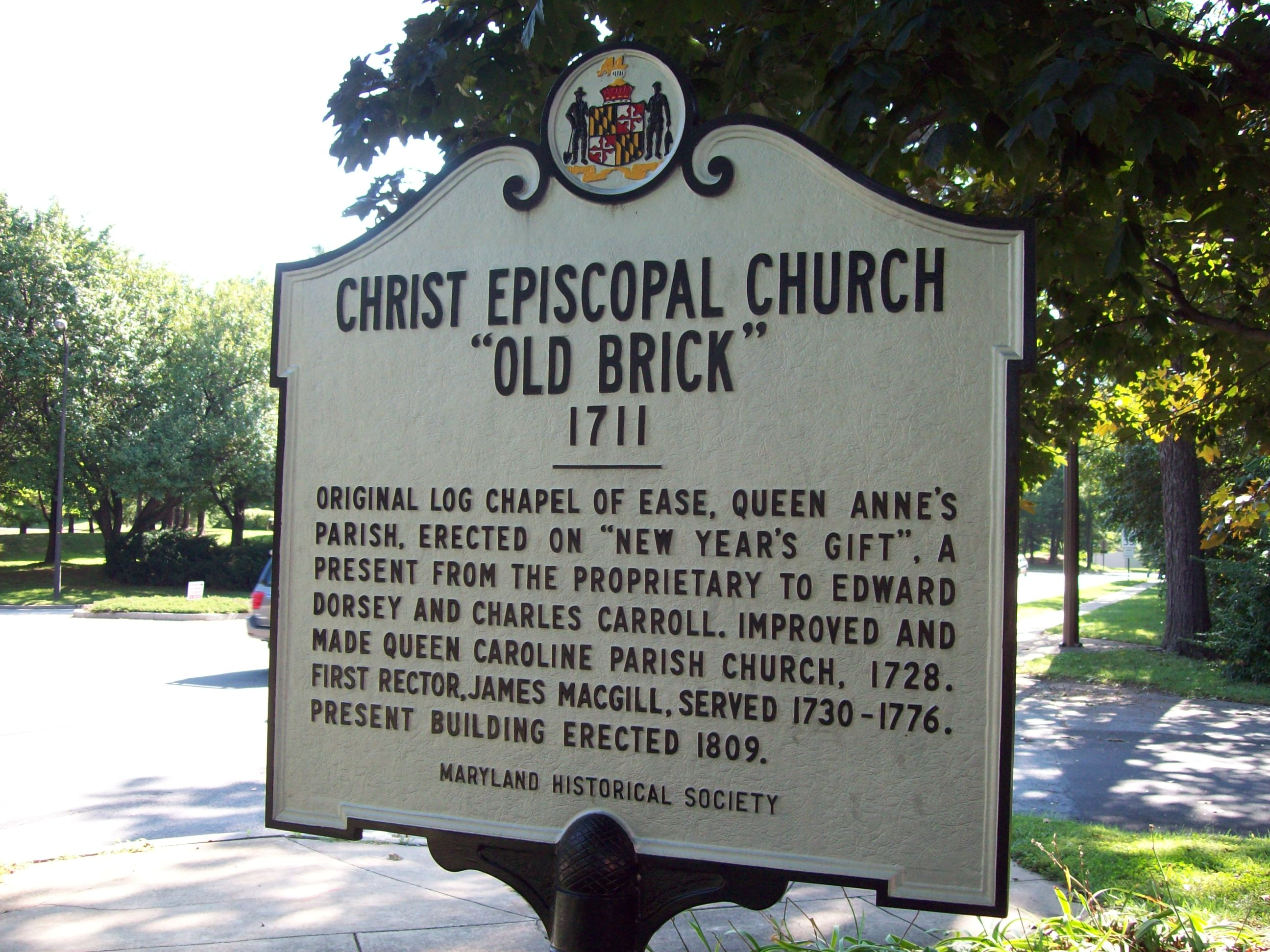
Christ Church Guilford Historic Marker, September 2009

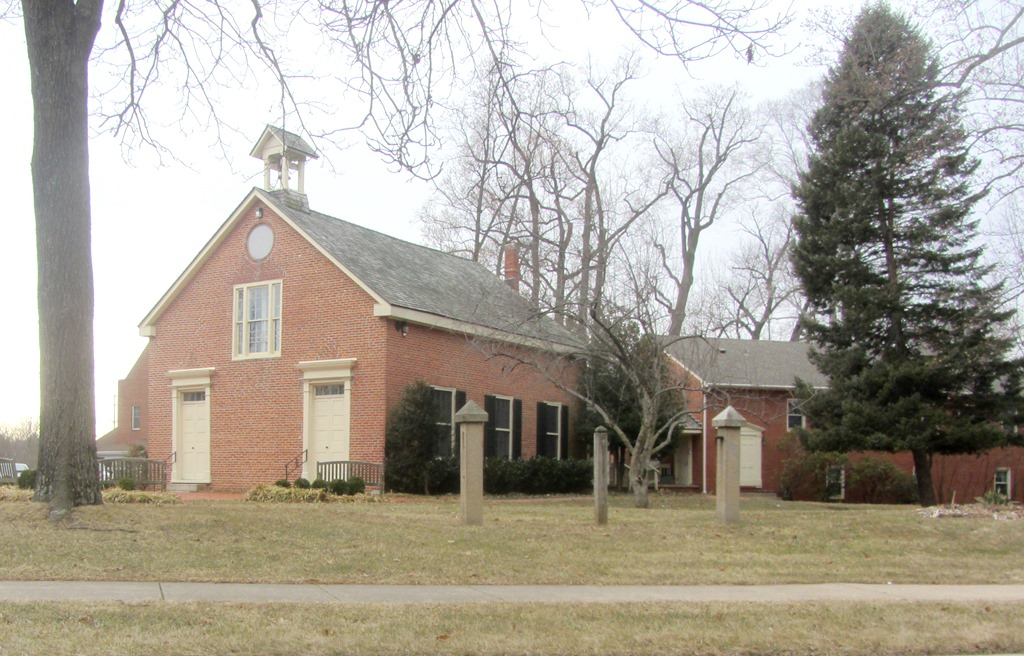
February 2015
