= Robinson Nature Center =

Nature education facility in Howard County, Maryland, U.S.

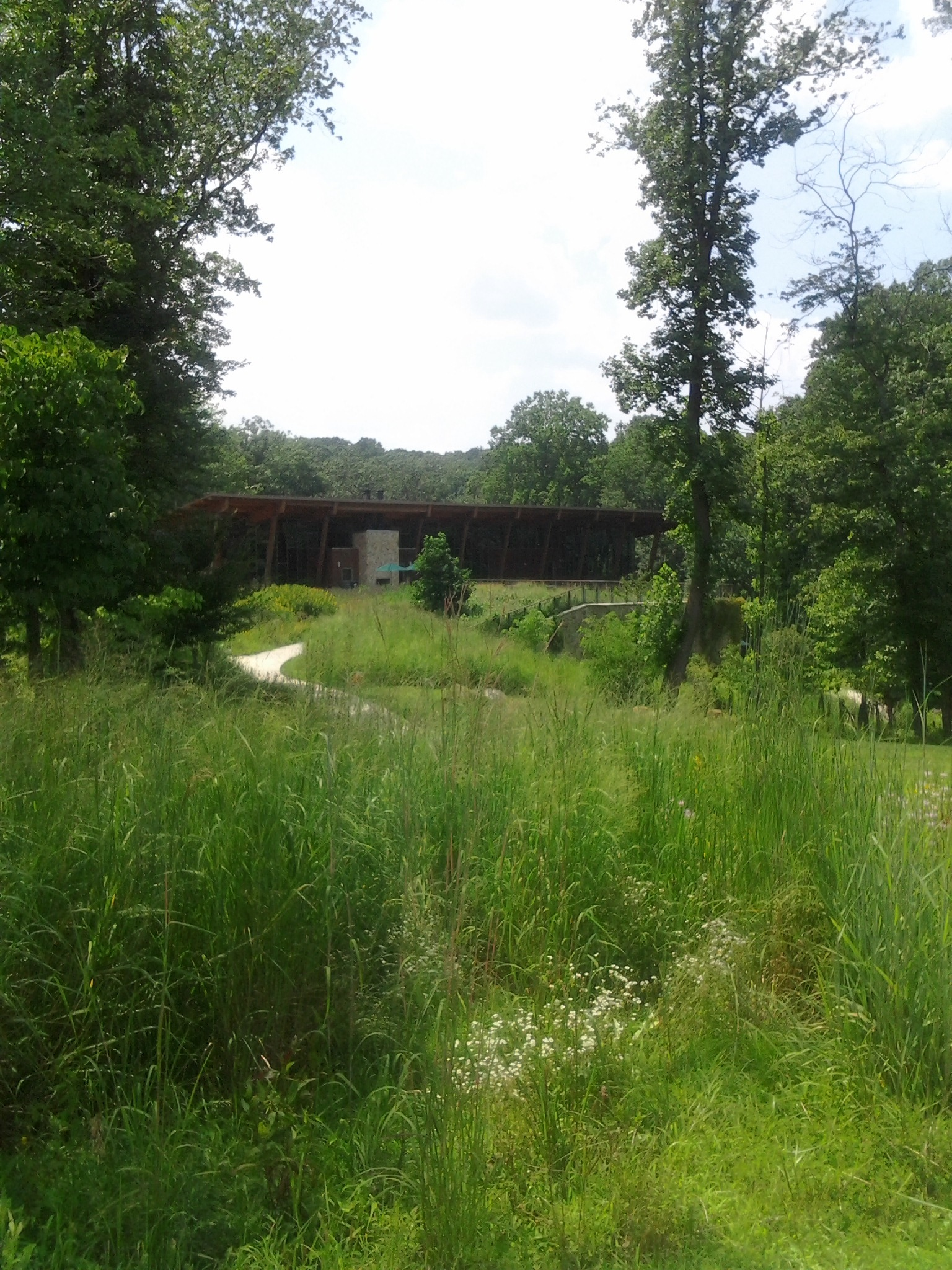
- Robinson Nature center building (background), and wildflower gardens (foreground).
- Interactive map of Robinson Nature Center
- Type: Nature center
- Location: 6692 Cedar Lane; Columbia, Maryland 21044
- Coordinates: 39.190606°N 76.894898°W
- Area: 22 acres (0.089 km^{2})
- Created: 2009
- Operator: Howard County, Maryland
- Website: www.howardcountymd.gov/RobinsonNatureCenter

The James and Anne Robinson Nature Center is a nature education facility situated on 18 acres of park land adjacent to the Middle Patuxent Environmental Area. Geothermal heating/air-conditioning, porous paving, solar panels, water conservation methods and other features make this building environmentally-friendly and have earned it the LEED Certified Platinum designation. Each year, the Center runs over 450 programs including field trips, public programs, birthday parties, home school and scout programs. James and Anne Robinson cared for the property for decades and kept it from being used by developers, ultimately arranging transfer to Howard County, Maryland for enjoyment by the general public. The Center continues to be partially supported by the James & Anne Robinson Foundation and is owned and operated by the Howard County Department of Recreation & Parks.

== Property history ==
The Nature Center was built on 18.3 of 22 acres of a 31-acre parcel that had been split from the Simpsonville Mill property by William and Rebecca Simpson and sold to Sophia Stern in 1891; subsequent sales were to Isaac Goldstein and Louis Abram in 1894, Eli Goldstein and family (Russian immigrants) in 1897, David and Agnes Johnson in 1902, Charles and Alice Baldwin in 1911, John Clifford and Martha Wall in 1914 (then 23.75 acres), and Harry and Rachel Saumenig in 1921. The property was purchased by James and Anne Robinson in 1957; it is adjacent to the modern Middle Patuxent Environmental Area and the core properties on Cedar Lane that were assembled to start the Rouse development of Columbia, Maryland. After decades of offers to buy the property for dense development, Anne Robinson approached the county in 2002 about passing the land to them for operation of a nature center. The purchase was settled on February 18, 2005, with funding from $1.7 million in county development excise taxes and $300,000 of Program Open Space money. The James & Anne Robinson Foundation, which Anne and her accountant created in 2003 to hold the property, returned $1 million of the proceeds of the sale as a contribution toward construction of the facility. Anne Robinson did not live to see the opening of the Nature Center; she died in 2005 at the age of 89. Her husband James had died in 1977.

In 2009, capital project funding of $1,010,000 was transferred from Meadowbrook Park, $250,000 from Rockburn Branch Park, $600,000 from Western Regional Park, $300,000 from Patapsco Female Institute, $600,000 from Cedar Lane School, $320,000 from Cedar Lane Athletic Improvements and Park Headquarters to build Robinson Nature Center. A total of $962,000 was budgeted for onsite road construction.

The center had its groundbreaking in 2009, although one Robinson family member expressed the family's unhappiness about the project. After the groundbreaking, the remains of the Robinson's mid-to-late 19th-century frame house adjacent to the Simpsonville Mill, in which Anne had lived until 2004 and which had been demolished in February 2005, were dismantled, as was a barn on the property. Wood from the barn was saved and, upon construction of the building, used to create siding and tables for an area in the front lobby dedicated to James & Anne Robinson as the "Legacy Room." The Nature Center, designed by GWWO Architects and built by Forrester Construction Co and KCI Technologies, opened on September 10, 2011.

The stone stairs that once led to the front porch of the Robinson house still remain on the property in their original location. A covered pavilion was erected in 2014 on the site of the house with the footprint of the original house etched in stonework on the pavilion's floor. In what was the front yard of the house, Anne Robinson had maintained planted gardens. Plants from these gardens were preserved, and a memorial garden was created around the original landscaping with the addition of native shrubs and trees, benches and a stone pathway.

== Anne Robinson's Letter of Instruction ==
In a notarized Letter of Instruction, dated September 25, 2002, Anne Robinson left guidance to Jeffrey D. Ring, her attorney-in-fact and Personal Representative under her Last Will and Testament. The letter stated:

I have lived the majority of my life on property known as 6692 Cedar Lane, Columbia, Maryland 21044 (the "Property"). I have become part of the Property, and the Property has become part of me. The memories of my late husband, James Howard Robinson; the beauty of the woods; the sounds of creatures; and the wonders of nature; all are part of me and my Property. It is my wish and desire to maintain my Property in its natural state for all to enjoy as I have. To that end, I have made provisions in my Last Will and Testament related to the disposition of my Property. In the event I become disabled or otherwise legally incompetent, I want all to know my desires and wishes. I am not concerned with the economic value of my Property nor am I concerned about leaving it to potential heirs. I want the Property to serve as a source of inspiration, education and beauty for the general public.

== Building ==
The 18-acre (7.3 ha) park features a 23,000 sq ft (2,100 m^{2}) LEED Platinum certified nature center building, built at a cost of $17.6 million. Constructed of reinforced concrete, with wood and stone above grade, the three-story building contains a 120-seat auditorium, 50-seat planetarium, solar panels, geothermal heating and parking for 112 vehicles on a parking lot constructed of permeable paving. A goal of the architect was to show how animals and plants co-exist with people in developed regions. A goal of the exhibit designer was to have people use the building as a starting point to learn about nature and then head outdoors to tour the trails and other areas.
