= Marriottsville, Maryland =

Unincorporated community in Maryland, United States

- Unincorporated community
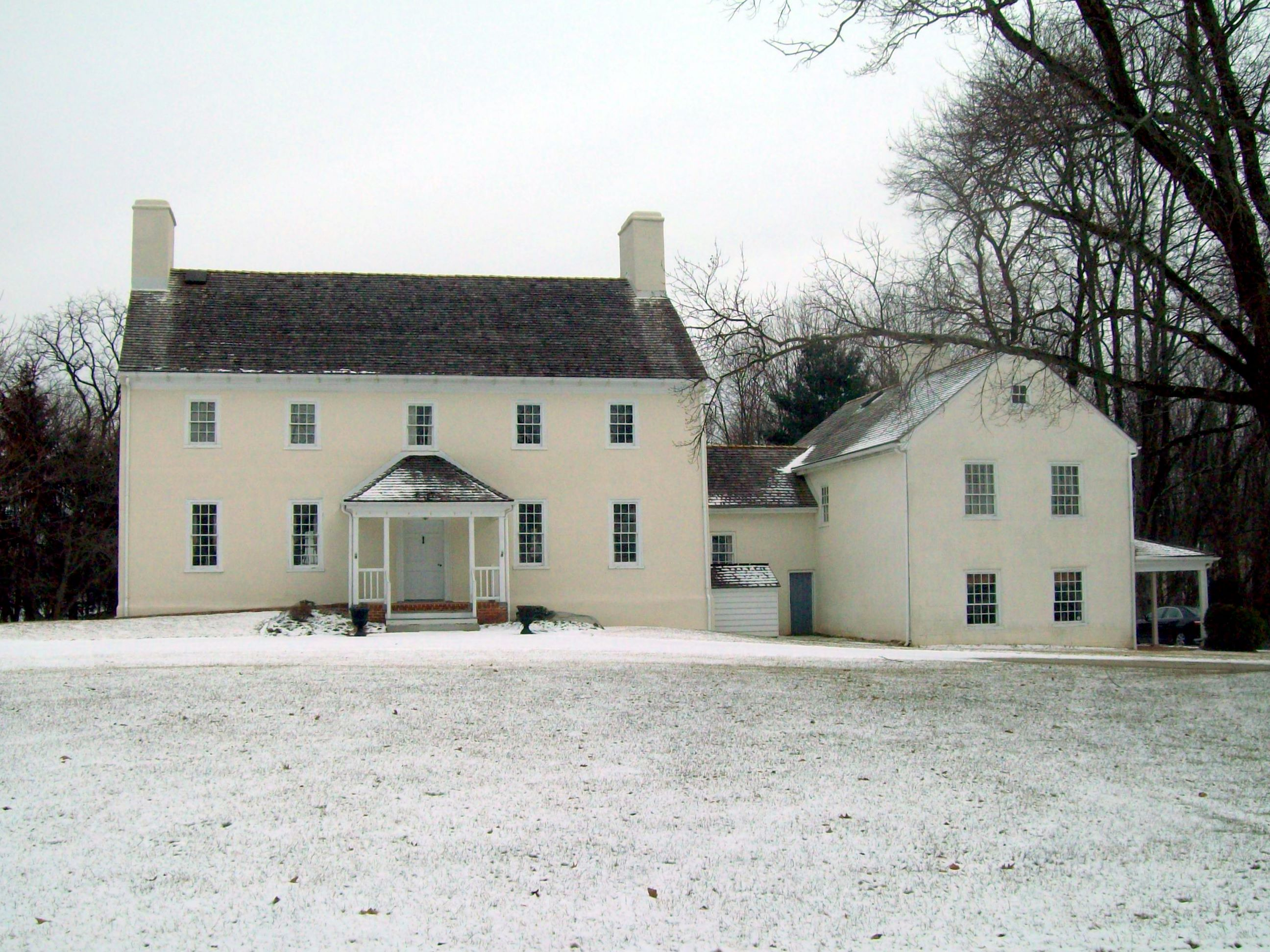
- Waverley Mansion

- Location within Maryland Location within the United States
- Coordinates: 39°21′00″N 76°53′58″W
- Country: United States of America
- State: Maryland
- County: Howard
- Elevation: 305 ft (93 m)
- Time zone: UTC-5 (Eastern (EST))
  - Summer (DST): UTC-4 (EDT)
- ZIP code: 21104
- Area codes: 410, 443, & 667
- GNIS feature ID: 590745

Marriottsville is an unincorporated community in Howard, Carroll and Baltimore counties, Maryland, United States. Marriottsville is located along Marriottsville Road near the Carroll County line, 10.3 miles (16.6 km) north-northwest of Columbia.

== History ==
Marriottsville is named after General William Hammond Marriott's estate. Marriott was an heir of John Marriott of Severn who settled in Anne Arundel County in 1664. The land was originally part of a large section of land patented by Charles Carroll of Carrollton. Waverley slave plantation occupied a significant portion of the land which was known as the Howard District of Anne Arundel County. The village was home to a magnesium limestone quarry, and was known for farms such as "Prospect Hill", and School Board member Henry O. Devries (1826-1902) farm.

On 22 March 1836, a railroad car derailed on a demonstration of the new railroad technology with 40 city leaders on board. In 1866, Reese's Mill was washed out by regional flooding.

From 1965 to 1974, large tracts of Marriottsville once known as Alpha were purchased by land speculators anticipating development. In 1977 County Executive Edward L. Cochran chose Marriottsville for a landfill site. Alpha Ridge Landfill opened in May 1980. An expansion plan proposed by Charles I. Ecker was suspended after contamination of groundwater was reported, which brought public water extensions, followed by density increases approved by the Howard County Department of Planning and Zoning for land development.

In 1998, Waverly Woods Golf Club opened in Marriottsville.

== Notable people ==
- George Howard (1789-1846) the twenty-second Governor of Maryland and son of John Eager Howard, also lived at "Waverly" after receiving it from his father in 1811.
- John Eager Howard (1752-1827) a Colonel in the Revolutionary War, U.S. Senator, namesake of Howard County and the fifth Governor of Maryland, owned the plantation "Waverly" which still stands in present-day Marriottsville.

== See also ==
- Ivy Hill (Marriottsville, Maryland)
