= Simpsonville, Maryland =

Unincorporated community in Maryland, United States

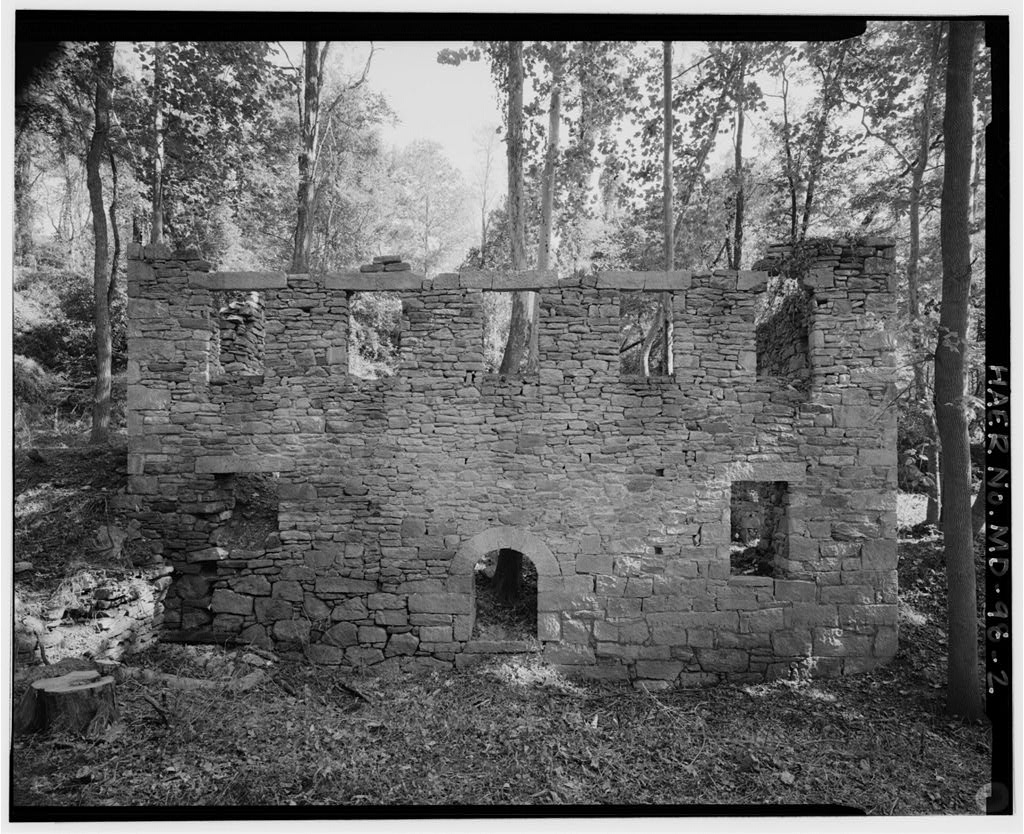
- Simpsonville Mill

- Location in Maryland
- Coordinates: 39°11′17″N 76°53′38″W
- Country: United States
- State: Maryland
- County: Howard
- Time zone: UTC-5 (EST)
  - Summer (DST): UTC-4 (EDT)
- Area code: 240 and 301

Simpsonville is an unincorporated community in Howard County, Maryland, United States.

== History ==
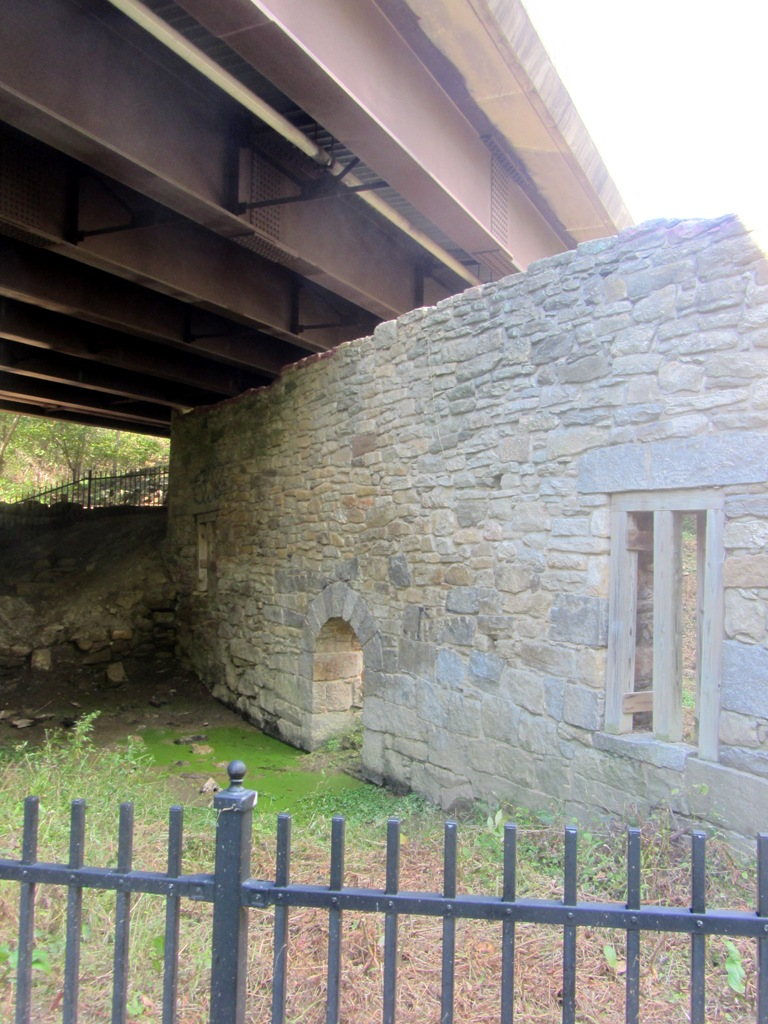
Simpsonville Mill under Cedar Lane bridge in 2014

People and nature have long flourished beside the Middle Patuxent River. Over 12,000 years ago, Native Americans hunted deer and gathered acorns and other wild food in the woods and waters. People from Woodland Indian cultures settled nearby approximately 2,000 years ago, leaving traces of their lives in the earthenware pottery and stone tools they left behind. In 1741, John Hobbs acquired the patent on the lands around Simpsonville. The land passed to Rachel Worthington in 1789, followed by Richard Owings in 1796. The early 19th century Simpsonville Mill water-powered grist mill and saw mill was built here, as well as a woolen factory, wheelwright shop, blacksmith shop, and nine houses. In 1850, the town became known as Simpsonville, named after its first postmaster, Charles Simpson. In 1852, Charles Ridgley Simpson bought 215 acres which included the mill and town center.

The Simpsons, Warfields, Owingses and other families lived in the Simpsonville for generations. In the 1920s and 1930s, mill owner John Iglehart kept detailed ledgers of purchases at his mill store. The Saumenigs, who owned the future Robinson property, shopped at the Iglehart store as early as 1926. The area was home to Howard County Commissioner De Wilton Partlett, who lost his home when his neighbor Fedora Boski burned his farm buildings and perished in the event in 1928. Simpsonville remained a hub for the local economy until undermined by the declining milling industry and the Great Depression. Nearby Atholton postal services were merged with Simpsonville. Lee Preston led Atholton High School students to conduct the first archeological excavations around Simpsonville in 1984. Over 42,000 artifacts have been recovered through decades of investigations, including machine parts, clothing, bottles, window glass, and two millstones. Primary documents, including wills, deeds, letters, and photographs, provide further insights into life and work in historic Simpsonville. The Simpsonville Mill Archaeological and Historic District is one of the few professionally studied mill sites in Maryland. Research at the site continues to reveal more about the roles of small industrial and commercial communities in Maryland's early economy.

From 1963 to 1966, The Rouse Company purchased large tracts of Simpsonville to develop Columbia. The development displaced farms and small scientific businesses like JEJA that bred scientific research primates. Throughout this time, inter-ethnic tensions were inflamed with cross burnings.

== See also ==
- Atholton, Maryland
- Simpsonville Mill
