= Oakland Mills =

Oakland Mills may refer to:

- Oakland Mills, Columbia, Maryland
  - Oakland Mills High School
  - Oakland Mills Blacksmith House and Shop
- Oakland Mills, New Jersey
