= Town Center, Columbia, Maryland =

Coordinates: 39°13′0″N 76°51′18″W

Town Center Downtown Columbia
- Village
- Columbia Town Center
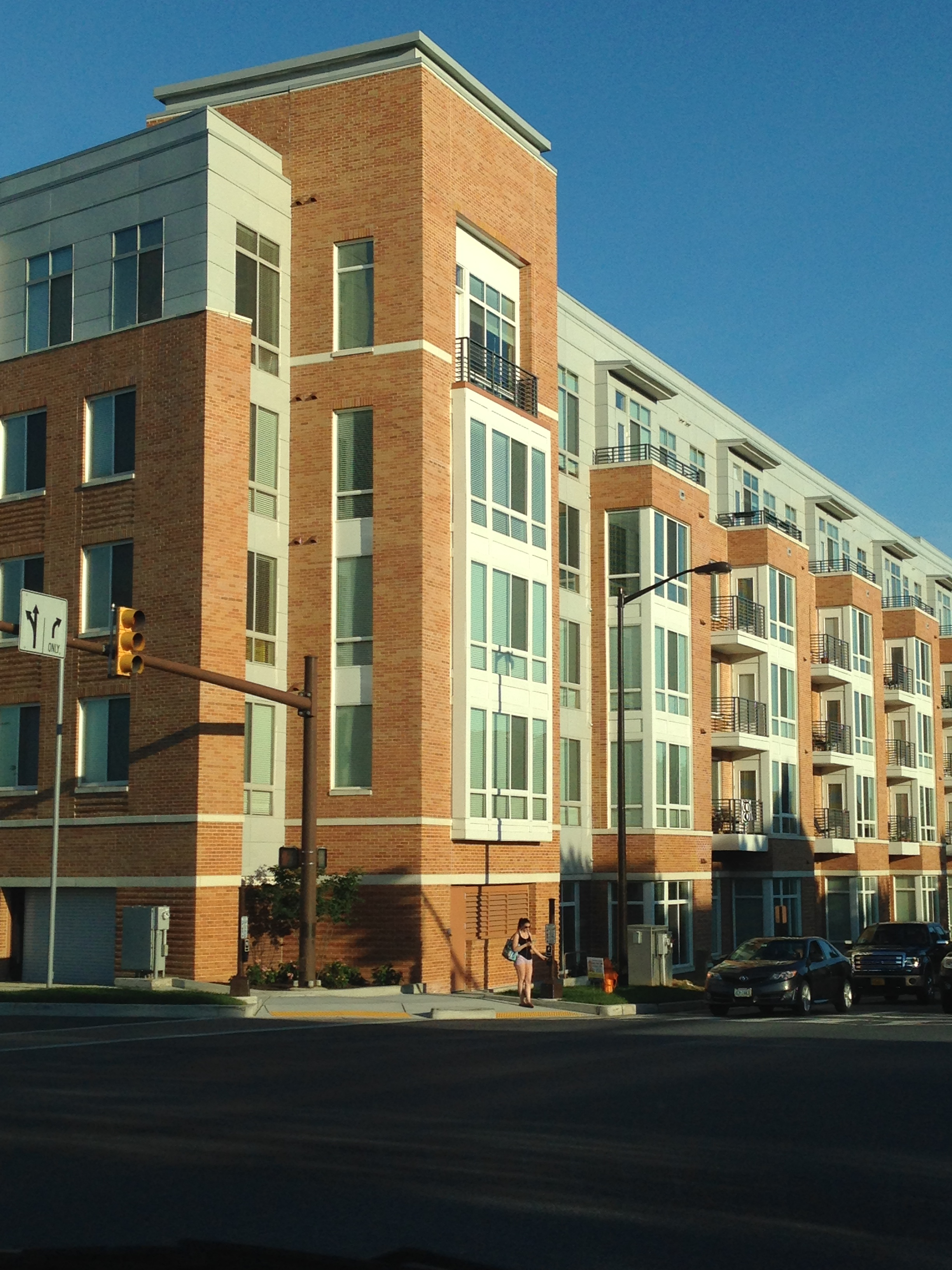
- Intersection of Broken Land Parkway and Town Center Avenue

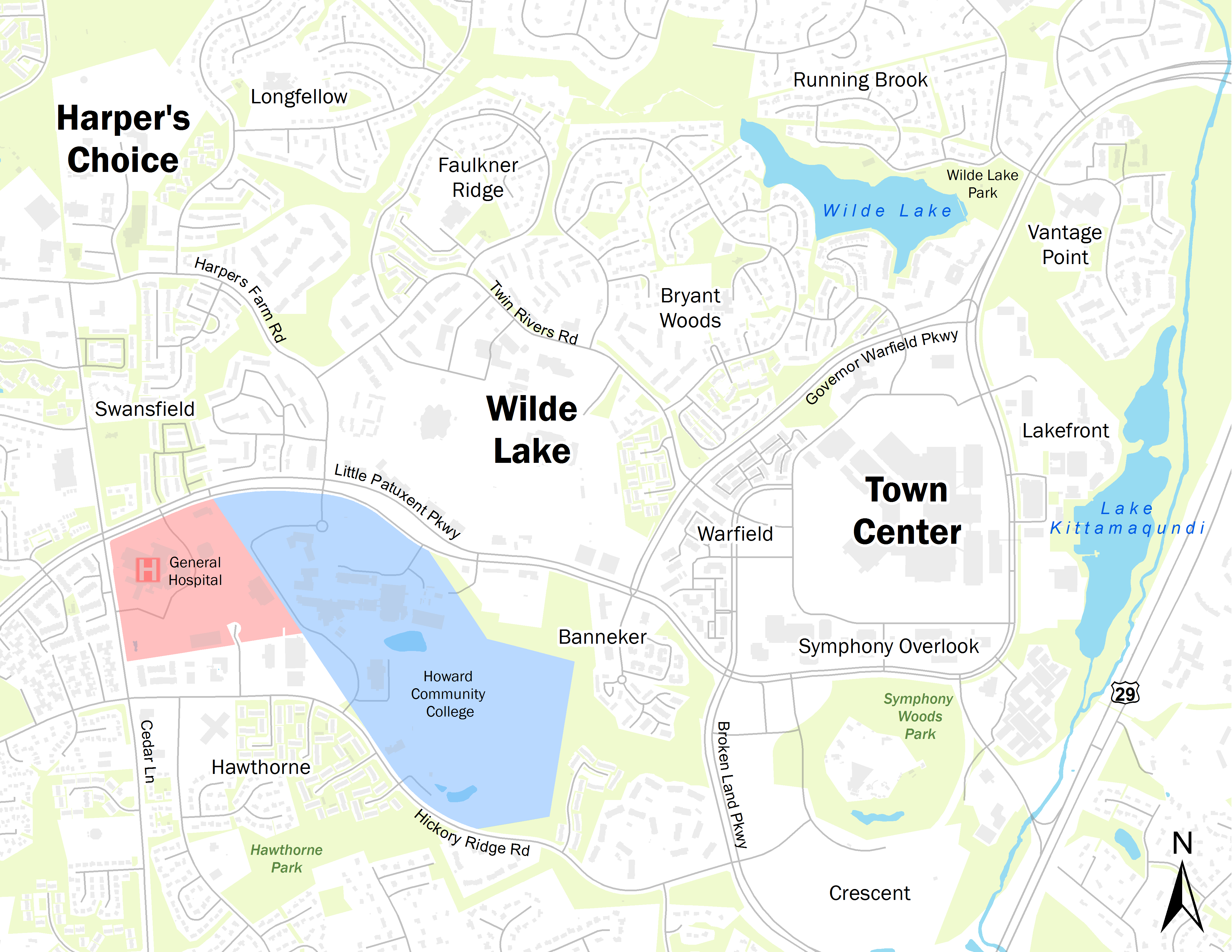
- Downtown Columbia featuring the Town Center and the Villages of Wilde Lake and Harper's Choice.
- Country: United States
- State: Maryland
- City: Columbia
- Established: 1974
- Founder: James Rouse
- Named for: Columbia's city center
- Website: www.columbiatowncenter.org

Town Center is one of the ten villages in Columbia, Maryland, first occupied in 1974. Town Center is a non-contiguous area and the most urban-like, ranging from multi-level high density apartments, homes and office buildings to single family homes.

The six residential neighborhoods in the village include Amesbury Hill, Banneker, Creighton's Run, Lakefront, Vantage Point, and Warfield Triangle.

== Names and history ==
The town center is constructed on the grounds of Oakland Manor, a former slave plantation. Construction started in 1966, with sidewalks linking major amenities added in 1984.

=== Original attractions ===
Columbia Exhibit Center is the facility built to market the project to visitors. The building was designed by the firm of Gehry, Walsh and O'Malley. The site hosted 215,000 in its first year.

Vantage Point is in the tract patented by John Dorsey as Dorsey's Adventure in 1688. The name comes from a poem by Robert Frost, and the street names are from Frost and William Cullen Bryant. It contains a house, Oakland Manor, built in 1811 by Charles Sterrett Ridgely. The Town Center village offices are in Oakland Manor. Oliver's Carriage House, a stable built by Robert Oliver, is on the grounds and is currently home to Kittamaqundi Community Church, a non-denominational religious congregation.

Amesbury Hill was originally set aside as an estate area for Rouse Company executives and was part of the Mercer Tract. Mercer Tract was owned by the parents of Lucy Mercer, the personal secretary to Franklin Delano Roosevelt. Creighton's Run, developed in 1979, was named for the boss of the construction company.

Banneker was first occupied in 1992, named for Banneker Road. The road was named for Benjamin Banneker.

The Residences at Vantage Point (originally named Vantage House) is a 13-story life care retirement community built in place of an 18th-century historical residence and opened in October 1990.

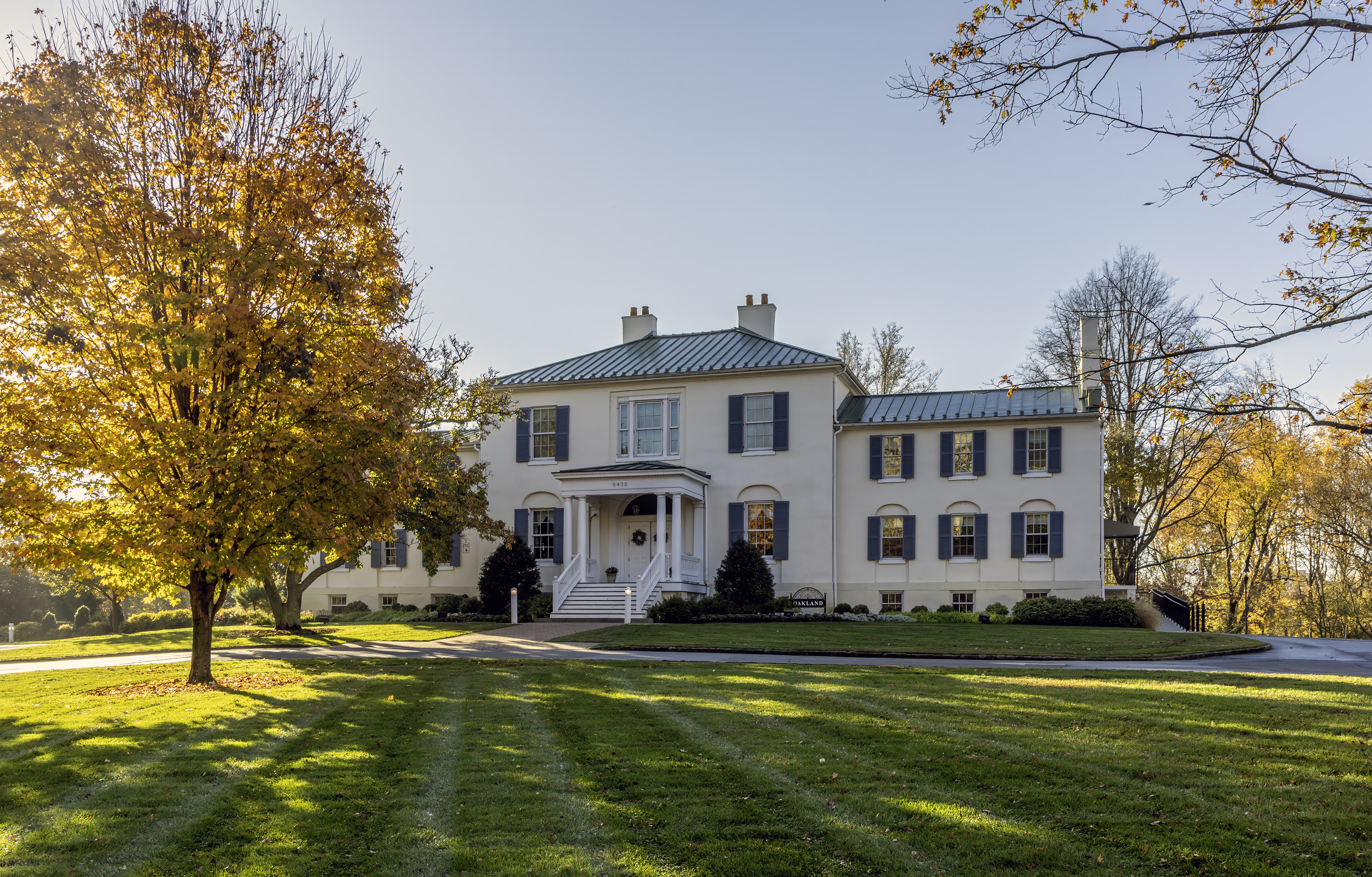
Oakland Manor

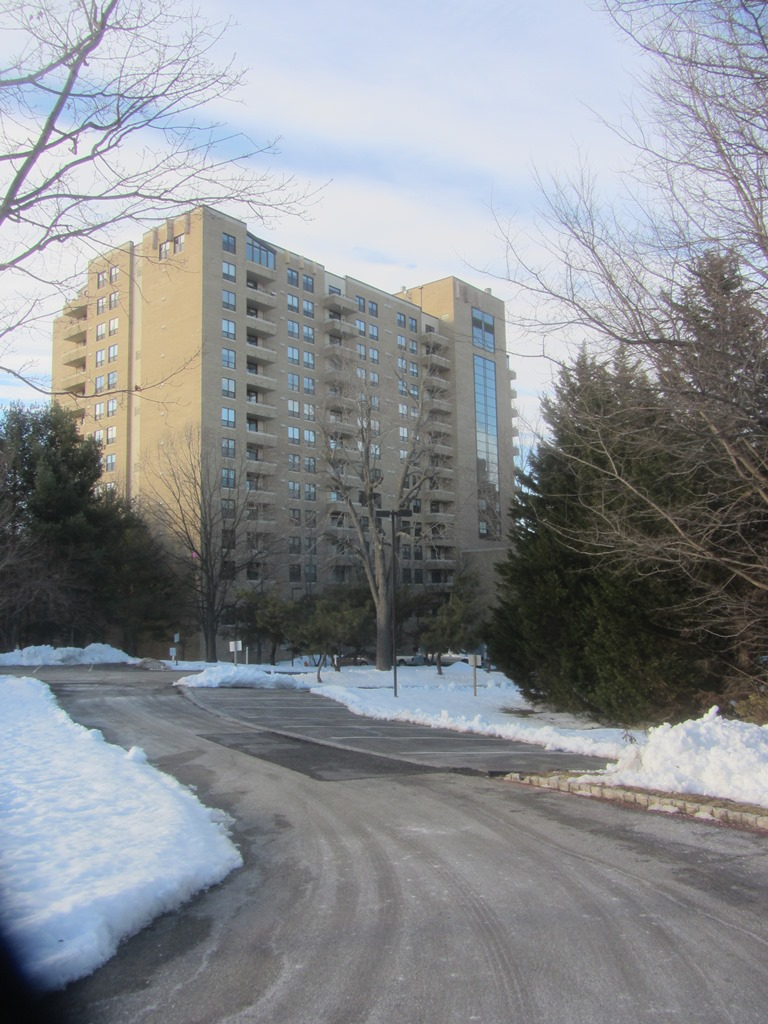
The Residences at Vantage Point

==== Frank Gehry buildings ====
Town Center features four buildings designed by Pritzker Prize-winning architect Frank Gehry:

- Banneker Fire Station (1967)
- Columbia Exhibit Center (1967)
- Merriweather Post Pavilion (1967)
- Rouse Company Headquarters (1974) (renovated into a Whole Foods Market in 2014)
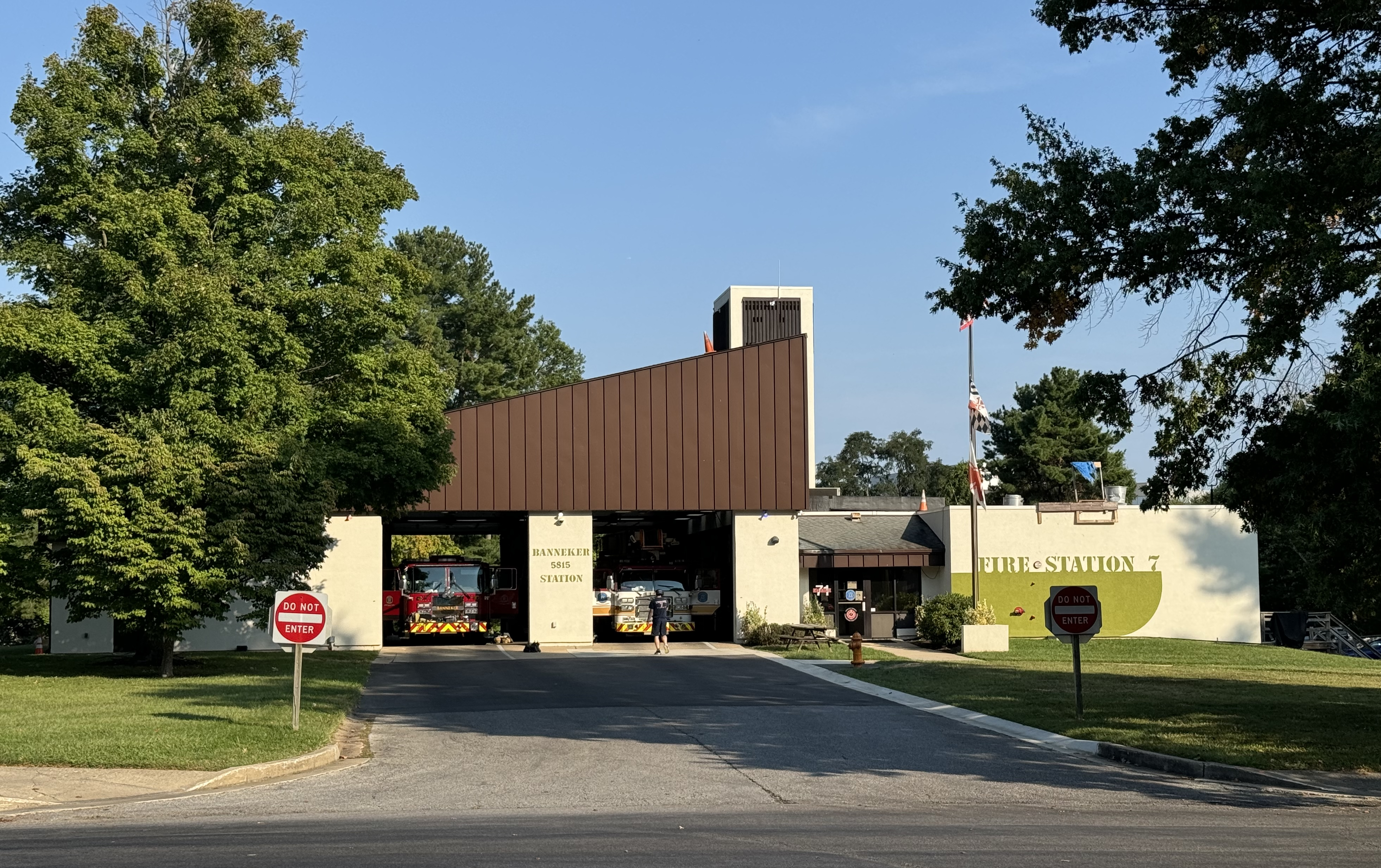
Banneker Fire Station

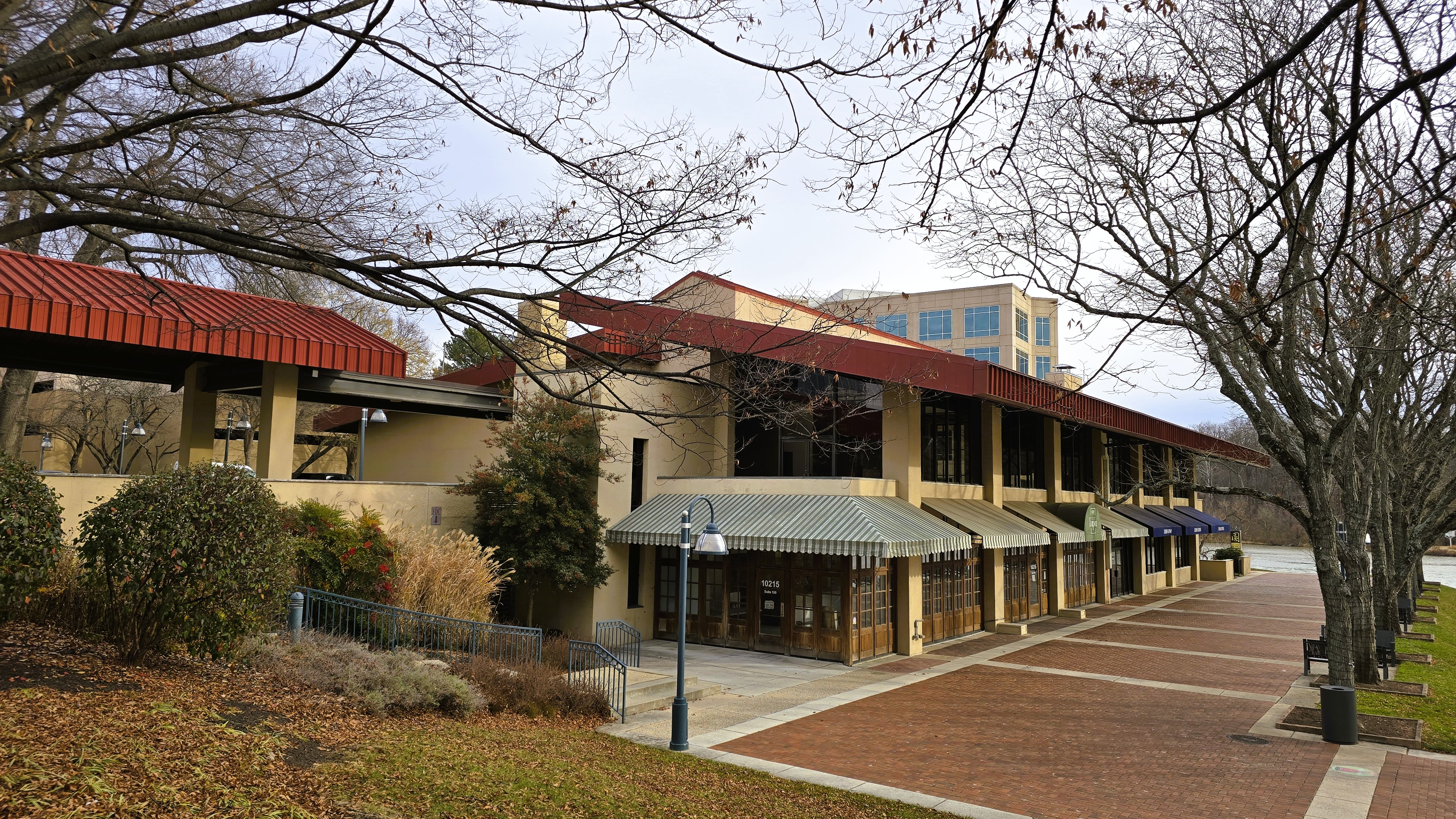
Columbia Exhibit Center

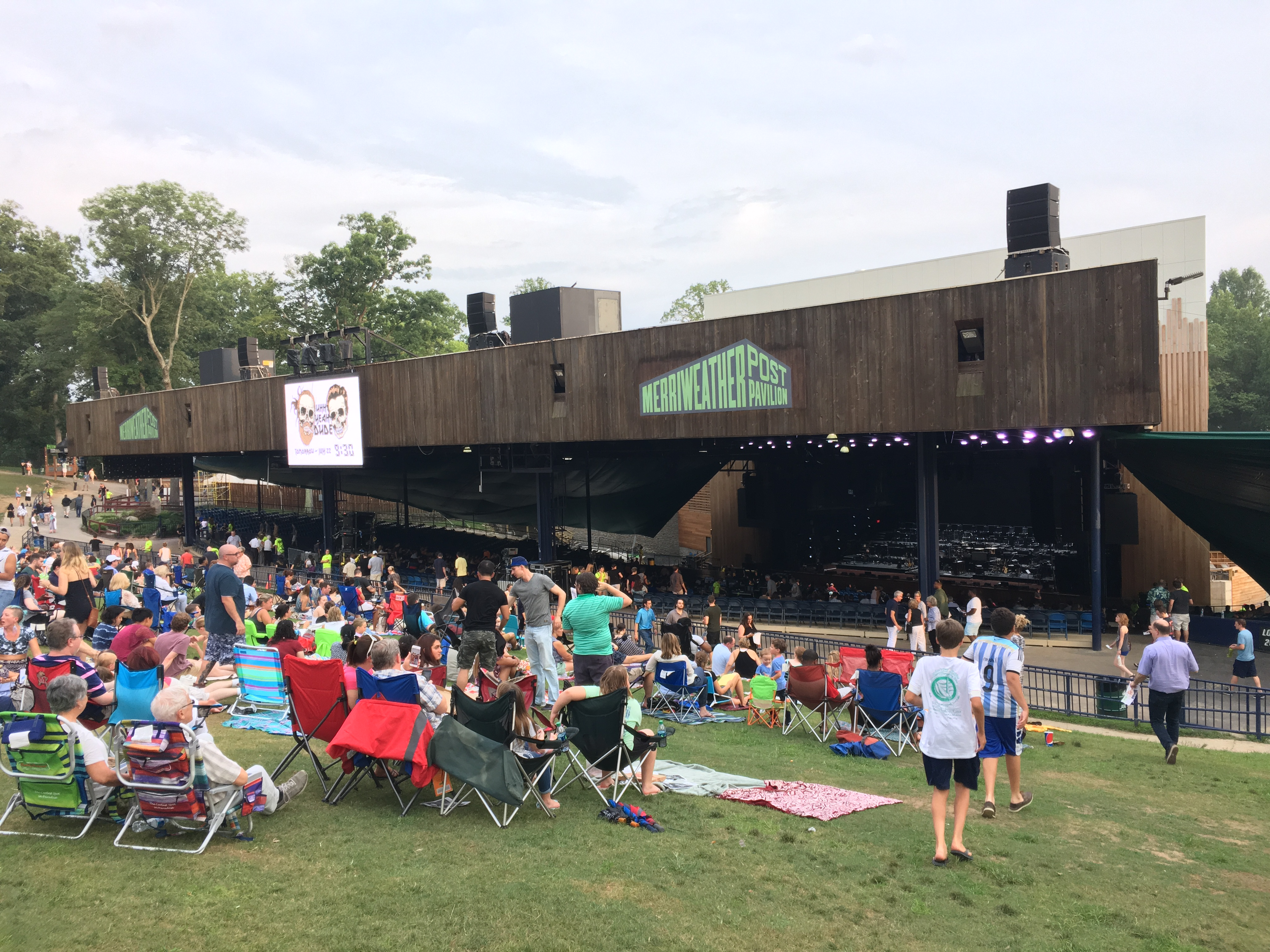
Merriweather Post Pavilion

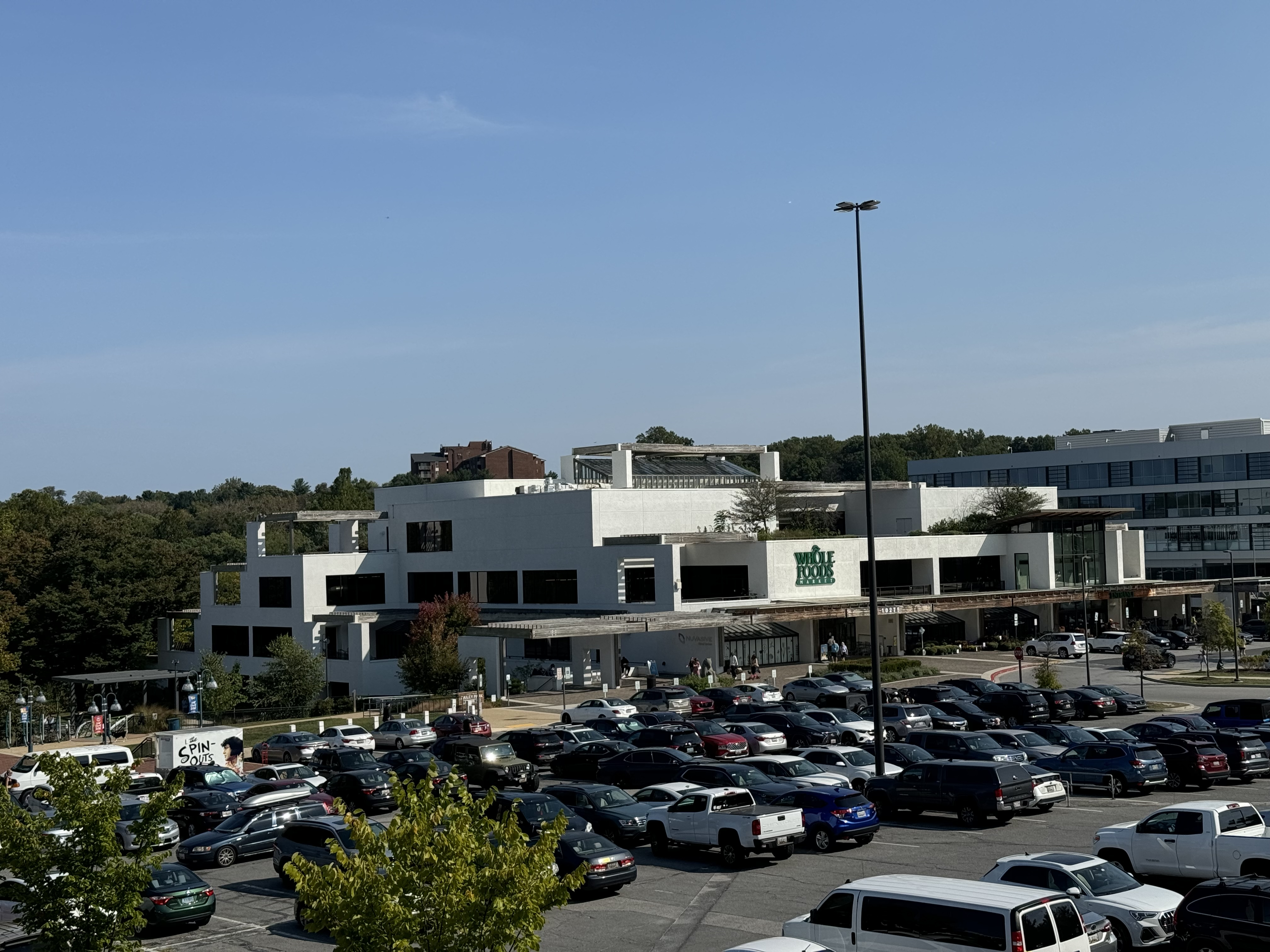
Rouse Company Headquarters

=== Redevelopment efforts ===
The Town Center is also referred to as "Downtown Columbia" due to its central location within Columbia, as well as the new urbanism-style redevelopment project under construction since 2010. The new development also created four new distinct neighborhood areas:

- Crescent, located south of the Merriweather-Post Pavilion and will be accessed off of Broken Land Parkway
- Lakefront, located west of Lake Kittamaqundi
- Symphony Overlook, located just north of Symphony Woods Park and south of the Columbia Mall Food Court
- Warfield, located in between Broken Land Parkway and Governor Warfield Parkway. In 1998 the first apartments were occupied in Warfield Triangle, named for Governor Warfield Parkway, in turn named for Governor Edwin Warfield.

== Services and entertainment ==
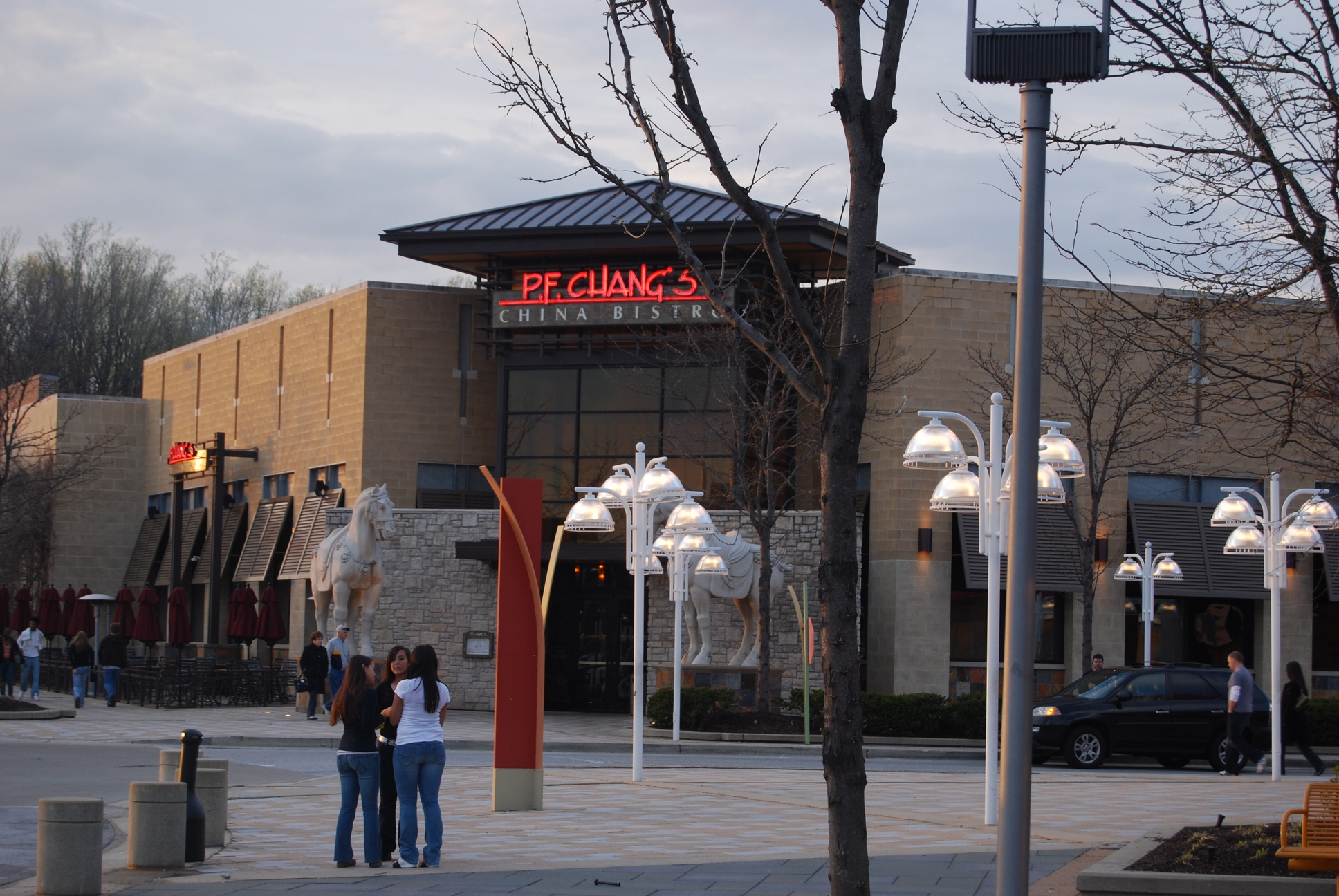
P. F. Chang's at The Mall in Columbia

The lakefront of 27-acre (110,000 m^{2}) Lake Kittamaqundi with the iconic People Tree sculpture, is the heart of the village, and the whole town. The lake's name is a Piscataway word described by the Columbia Association as "meeting place", or "Place of the Old Great Beaver" by Native American research. In the summer, the Columbia Association offers live entertainment and/or movies daily at the Kittamaqundi lakefront.

The Mall in Columbia, a large shopping and entertainment mall, is located within Town Center.

== Public transit ==
Columbia Town Center is a major hub for the Regional Transportation Agency of Central Maryland bus service. The central station is located at the Columbia Mall, directly west of the Main Entrance, Restaurant Row, and Sears. MTA and Metrobus provide service to this location as well.

In 2016, Howard County launched its first bike share pilot program for Columbia. The bike share will span across the Town Center from Howard County General Hospital at Cedar Lane to Blandair Park in Oakland Mills Village.
