= Columbia Town Center =

Columbia Town Center may refer to:

- Town Center, Columbia, Maryland
- The Mall in Columbia in Columbia, Maryland
