= Wilde Lake High School =

Public high school in Columbia, Maryland, U.S.

Coordinates: 39°13′3″N 76°52′21″W

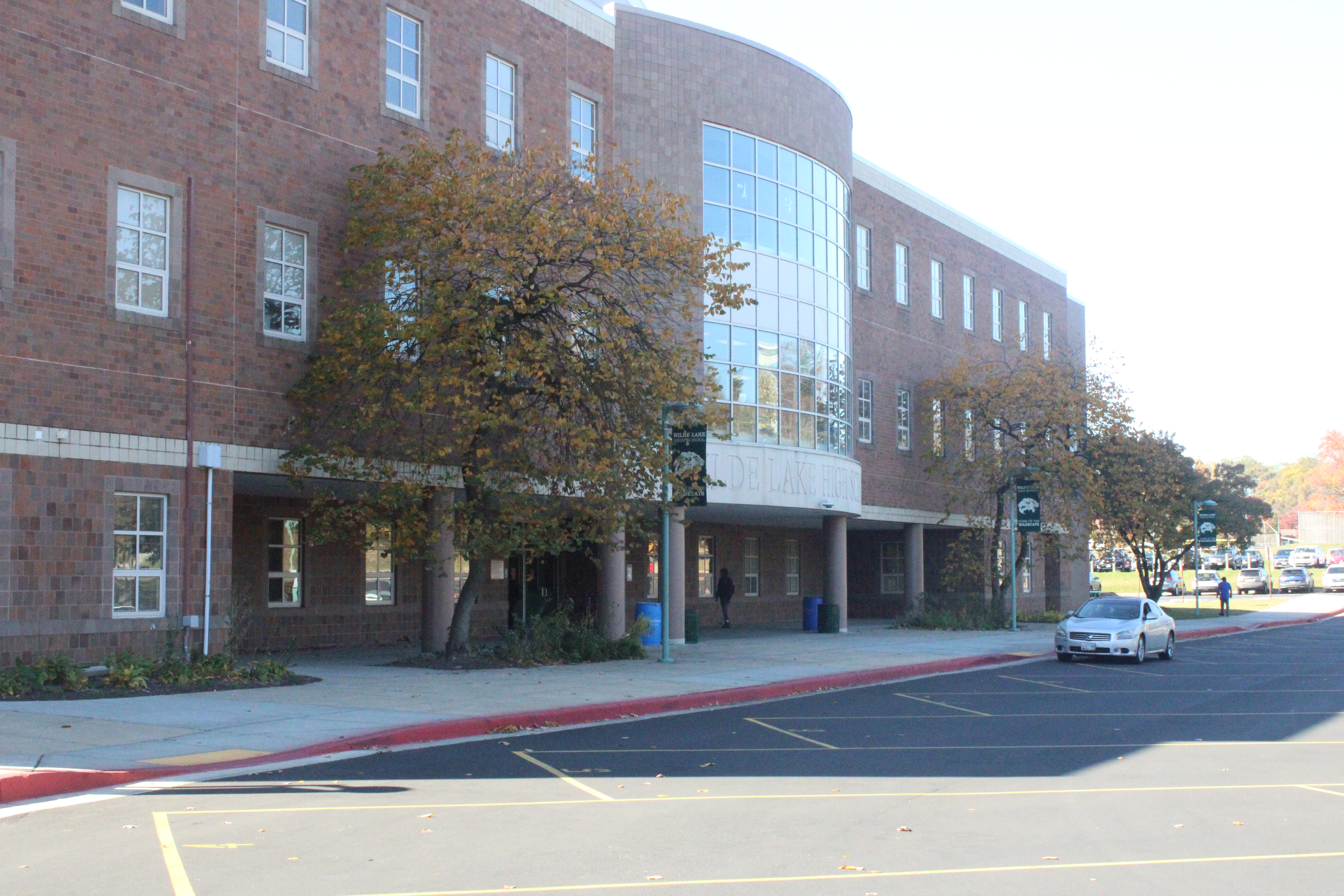

Location
- 5460 Trumpeter Road; Columbia, MD 21044; United States

Information
- Type: Public high school
- Established: 1971
- School district: Howard County Public School System
- Principal: Michael Brown
- Grades: 9–12
- Enrollment: 1,291
- Colors: Green and Gold
- Mascot: Wildecat
- Rival: Oakland Mills High, River Hill High, and Atholton High
- Newspaper: The Paw Print
- Website: wlhs.hcpss.org

Wilde Lake High School is a public high school located at the village of Wilde Lake in Columbia, Maryland, United States. It is one of the 13 public high schools in Howard County.

The school is centrally located in Howard County, and its district borders that of River Hill High School, Marriotts Ridge High School, Centennial High School, Howard High School, Oakland Mills High School, and Atholton High School.

== History ==
Bids were requested by January 1970 for a 1,350-seat school to be built for an estimated US$2.6 million. Opened in 1971 as a model school for the nation, it was Columbia's first high school. It had an open doughnut-shaped design with "open classrooms," and was a model school for new teaching settings.

In 1994, the original 910-student building, which did not meet current safety standards, was demolished. A new $20 million 1,200-seat building with a more traditional style was reconstructed on the same site by Cochran, Stephenson and Donkevoet. The new building, which opened in 1996, replicates the open design, with a central "main street", and halls surrounding it and a bridge across the second floor.

== Students ==
Student population
1990	1991	1992	1993	1994	1995	1996	1997	1998	1999
unk.	unk.	unk.	822	848	1,037	1,228	1,342	1,418	1,452
2000	2001	2002	2003	2004	2005	2006	2007	2008	2009
1,414	1,480	1,567	1,489	1,440	1,392	1,434	1,373	1,351	1,370
2010	2011	2012	2013	2014	2015	2016	2017	2018	2020
1,335	1,324	1,277	1,271	1,242	1,234	1,236	1,225	1,276	1,379

The racial makeup of the population during the 2017–2018 school year was 26.7% White, 43.8% Black or African American, 7.2% Asian, 14.6% Hispanic or Latino, 0% Native American, 0.4% Native Hawaiian or Pacific Islander, and 7.4% two or more races.

== Jim Rouse Theatre ==
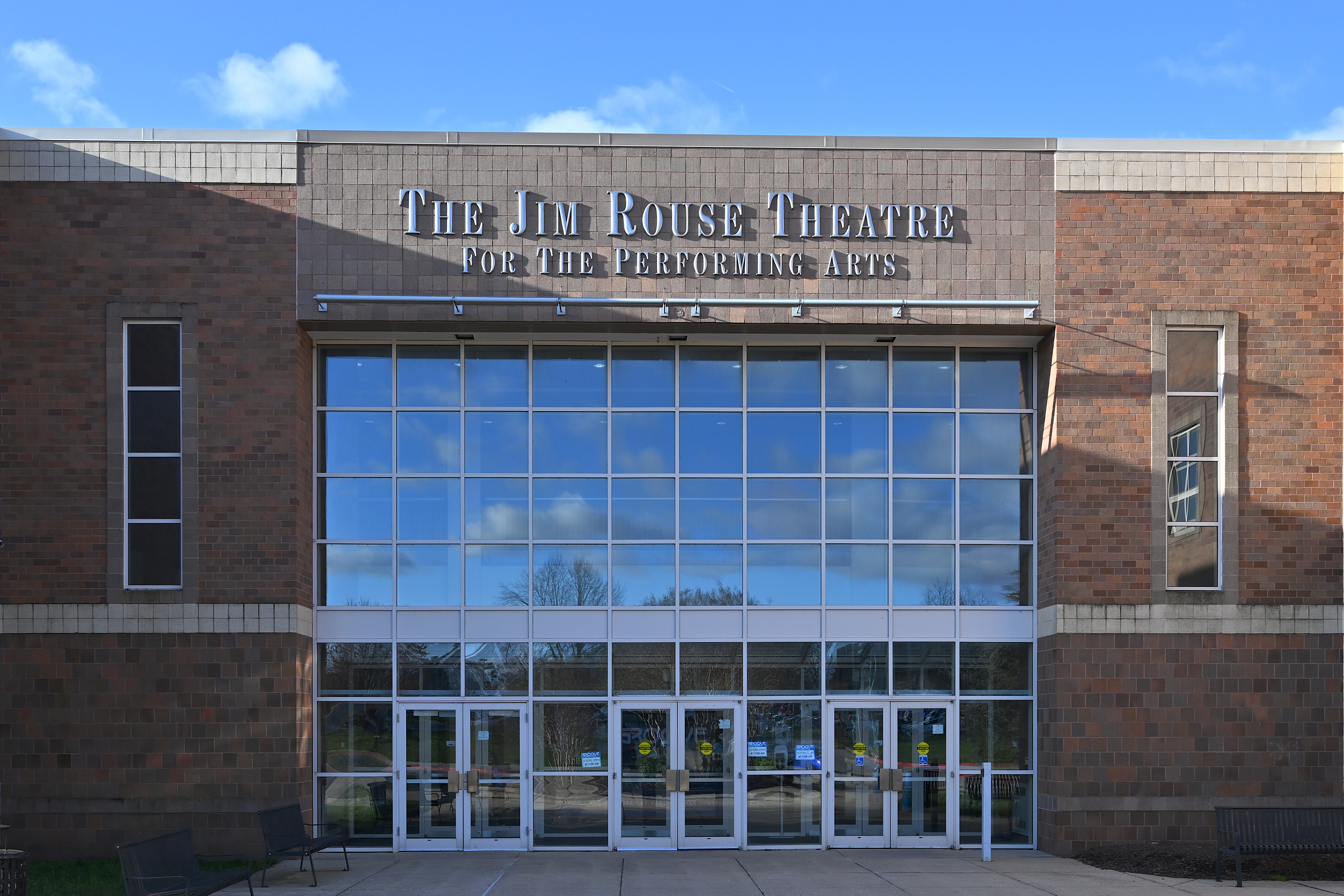
Jim Rouse Theatre at Wilde Lake High School

Wilde Lake has a modern 750-seat theater named for Columbia founder James Rouse, who went by "Jim". The theatre has its own separate entrance and is used by both school and community groups. The 12,500-square-foot performance space is also used for community meetings, sales rallies, exhibitions, and business training sessions. The theatre has a total of 739 seats and eight handicapped accessible locations. Coincidentally, Rouse’s grandson Edward graduated from Wilde Lake in 1987.

== Athletics ==
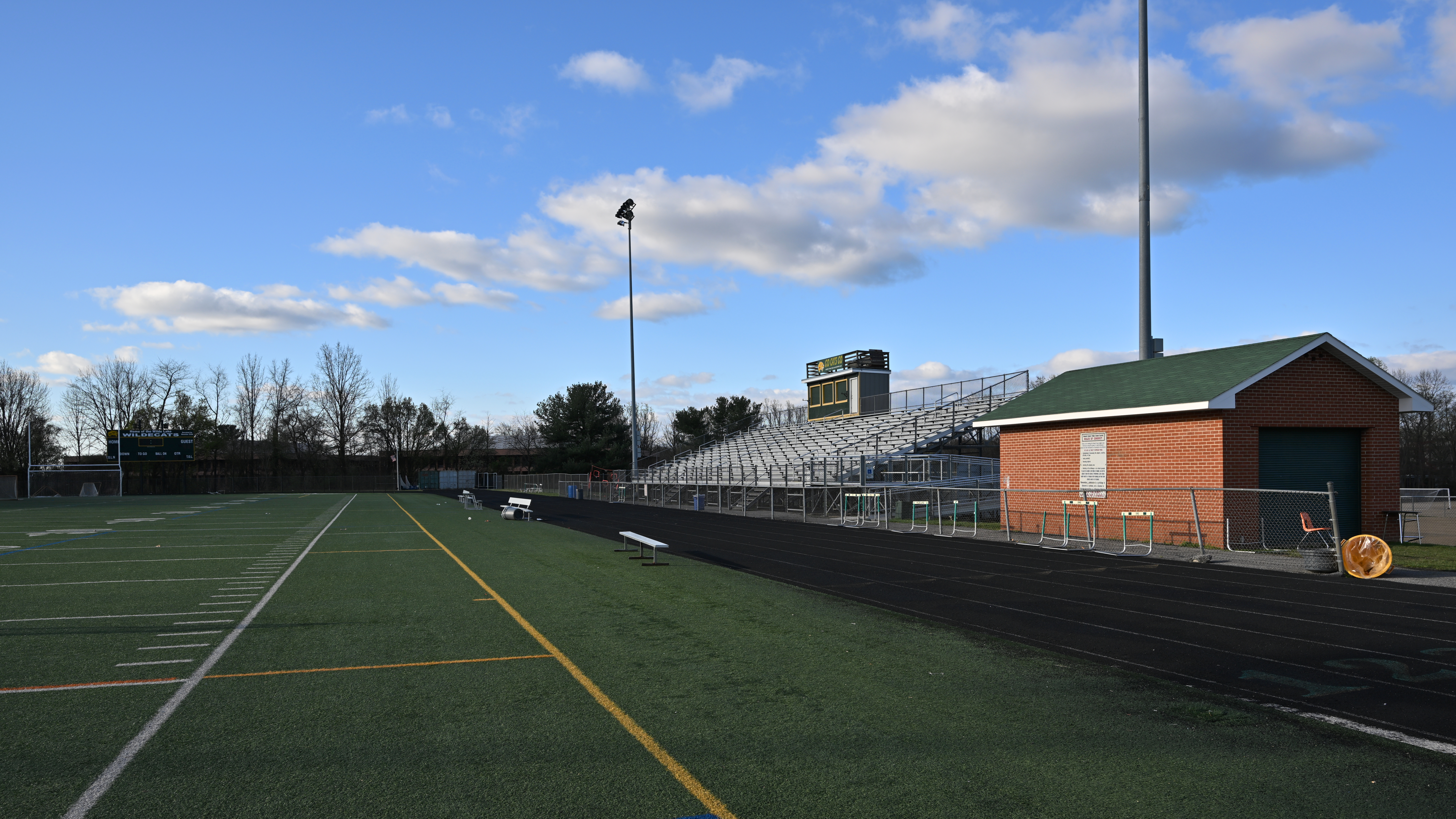
Wilde Lake High School stadium

Wilde Lake High School has a number of sports teams for each season of the academic year, including football, soccer, golf, volleyball, basketball, and cross country. The school has won the following state championships:

=== Cross country ===
- 1971 – Boys' cross country
- 1996 – Girls' cross country
- 1996 – Boys' cross country
- 2005 – Boys' cross country
- 2006 – Boys' cross country
- 2007 – Boys' cross country

=== Football ===
- 1985 – Football
- 1990 – Football
- 1991 – Football
- 1992 – Football
- 1997 – Football
- 2010 – Football

=== Soccer ===
- 1976 – Boys' soccer
- 1981 – Boys' soccer
- 1982 – Boys' soccer
- 1983 – Boys' soccer
- 1984 – Boys' soccer
- 1991 – Boys' soccer
- 1997 – Boys' soccer
- 2019 – Boys' soccer

=== Basketball ===
- 1985 – Boys' basketball
- 1994 – Boys' basketball State Finalist
- 1995 – Girls' basketball

=== Ice hockey ===
- 2008 – State Finalist

Wilde lake no longer fields an independent ice hockey team. From 2011–2018, a co-op team with players from Oakland Mills and Hammond High Schools was formed, known as the “WHO”. In 2018, Centennial and Long Reach High Schools joined the WHO to form the Wolves.

=== Tennis ===
- 1985 – Boys' tennis doubles
- 1986 – Mixed doubles
- 2001 – Mixed doubles
- 2006 – Boys' tennis singles

=== Track and field ===
- 1975 – Boys' track and field

In 2015, Carol Satterwhite, a physical education teacher at the Wilde Lake High School was selected for the National Interscholastic Athletic Administrators Association Hall of Fame.

== Band program ==
The school has a band program consisting of groups including the marching band and wind ensemble.

== The Paw Print ==
The Paw Print is an independent publication of Wilde Lake High School.

== Accommodations ==
Wilde Lake has a special education program. In addition to its programs for the disabled, Wilde Lake accommodates teen mothers through their in school daycare center.

== Notable alumni ==
Notable alumni include actors Edward Norton (1987), Carly Hughes (2000), Sara Lindsey (2007), and Adria Tennor (1988). Alumni also include the authors and journalists Laura Lippman (1977), Robert Kolker (1987), and National Public Radio diplomatic correspondent Michele Kelemen (1985). David Bentley Hart (1982) is another writer, theologian, and cultural critic.

Wilde Lake alumni lawyers of note include national security and human rights attorney Jesselyn Radack (1988), who has represented constitutional lawyer Bruce Fein and whistleblowers Edward Snowden, Thomas Drake, John Kiriakou, and Daniel Hale.

Wilde Lake also produced a number of prominent athletes, including Olympic gymnast Elise Ray (2000), Major League Baseball player Jim Traber (1979), and football players Zach Brown and Isaiah Coulter, who attended freshman through junior year.

Politicians of note include Manhattan borough president Mark D. Levine (1987) and Dr. Terri L. Hill (1977), Maryland State Delegate, District 12

Notable musicians include Lo-Fang (2002) and Greg Saunier (1987).

Teen prodigies who graduated from Wilde Lake High include John Overdeck (1986) (a billionaire hedge fund manager and philanthropist); and Curtis Yarvin (1988) (a computer scientist, political philosopher, and neoreactionary thinker).

== See also ==
- Howard County Public School System
