= Howard County Center of African American Culture =

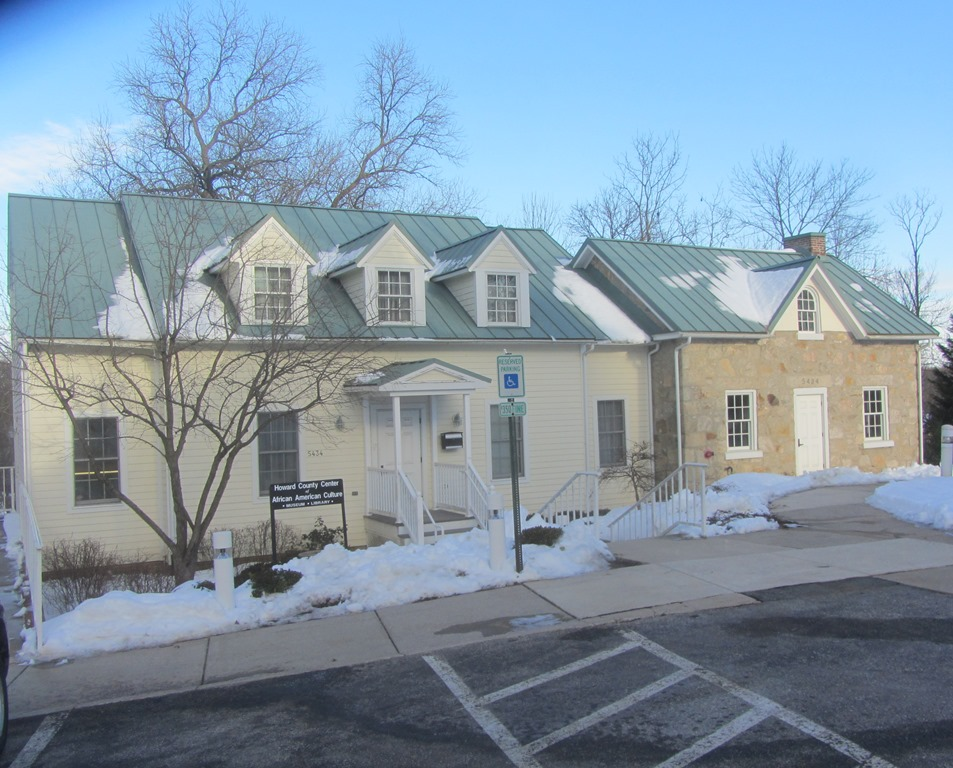
- Howard County Center of African American Culture

- Location within Maryland
- 39°13′20″N 76°51′18″W
- Nearest city: Columbia, Maryland

Site notes
- Area: 5434 Vantage Point Road

The Howard County Center of African American Culture is located in Columbia, Maryland. The museum host exhibitions and event about African American history.

== History ==
The museum was founded by Wylene and Olger Burch in 1987. The museum was first housed in the Howard County Community College, it was relocated to the Howard County Historical Society building in Ellicott City, then the Columbia branch of the Howard County Public Library. The Rouse Company and developer Donald Mannekin provided temporary space for the facility. The museum is currently housed in an outbuilding next to the Oakland Manor slave plantation house.

== Website ==
- Official website
