= Oakland Mills, Columbia, Maryland =

Oakland Mills
- Village
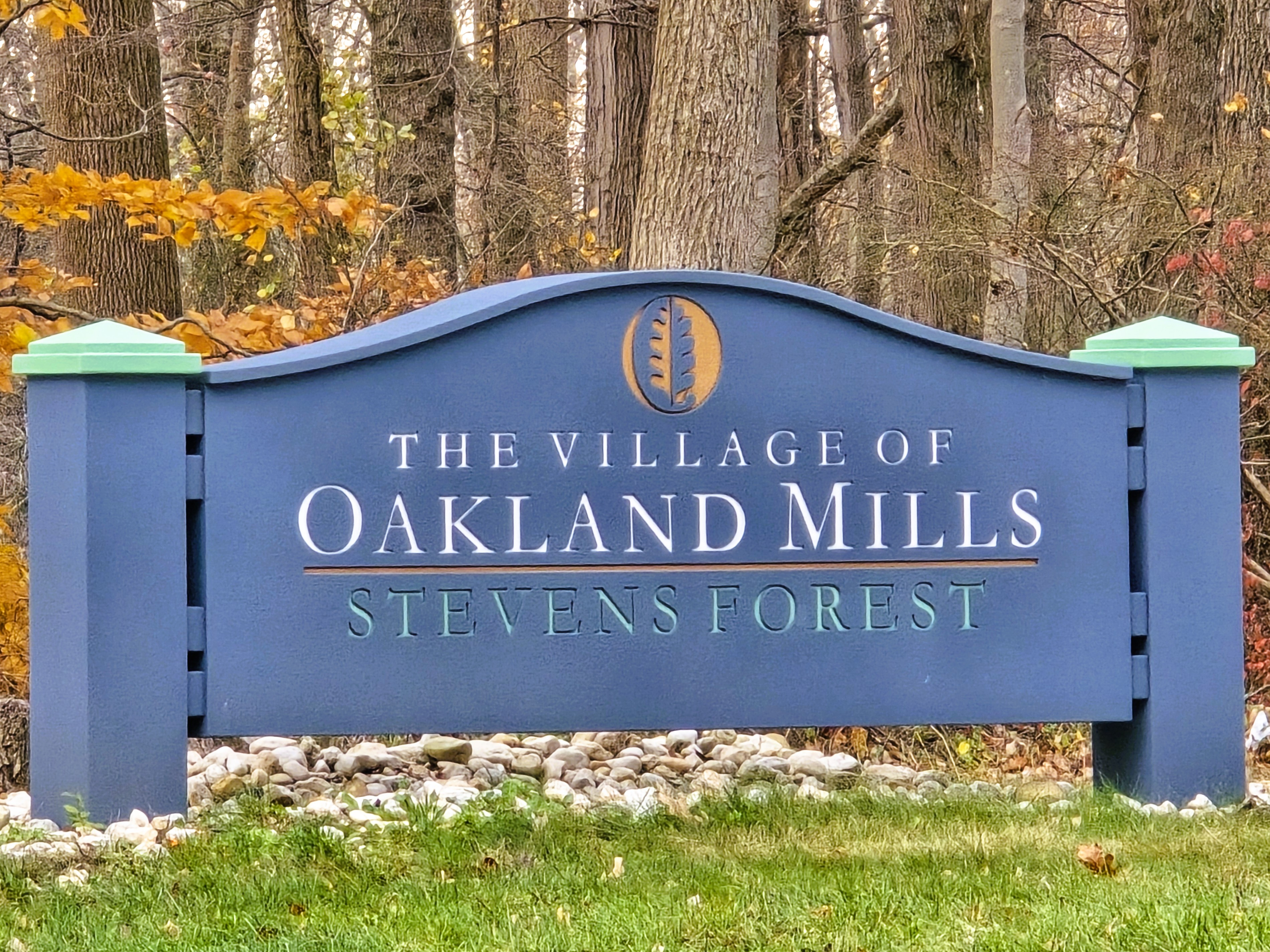
- Oakland Mills Village sign
- Interactive map of Oakland Mills
- Coordinates: 39°12′43″N 76°50′43″W
- Country: United States
- State: Maryland
- City: Columbia
- Established: 1968
- Named after: Oakland Mill
- Website: oaklandmills.org

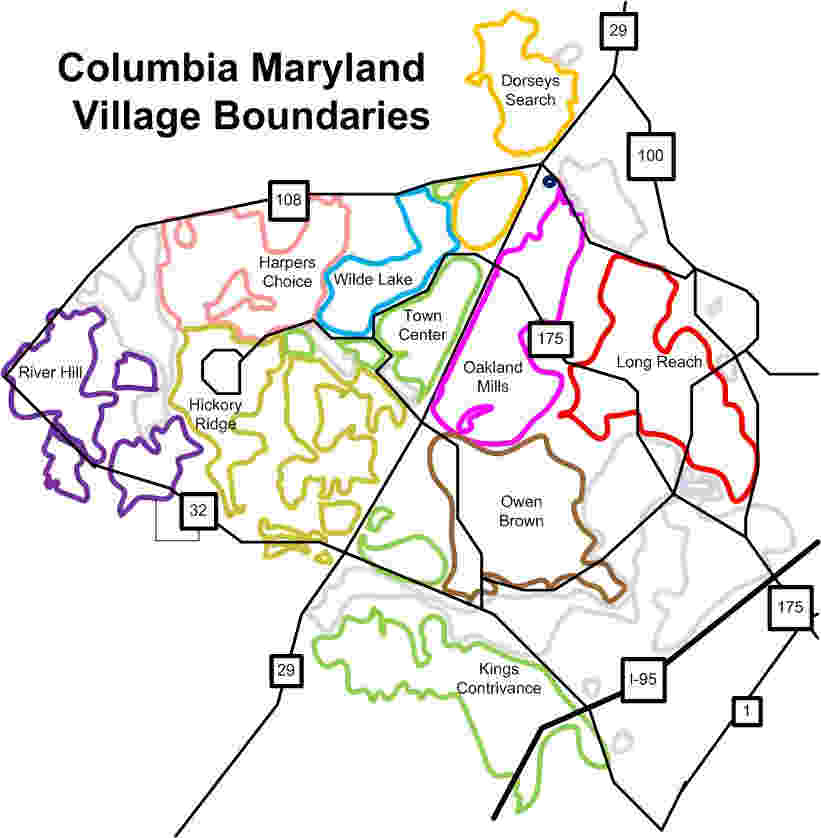
Villages of Columbia

Oakland Mills is one of the 10 villages in Columbia, Maryland, United States. It is located immediately east of Town Center, across U.S. Route 29.

Neighborhoods in the village of Oakland Mills include Steven's Forest, Talbott Springs, and Thunder Hill.

== History ==
The name Oakland Mills is derived from the mill and postal station in the local area that were part of a 2,300-acre (9.3 km^{2}) estate that combined Oakland Manor slave plantation and surrounding properties. The 1796 grist mill and its properties are aligned along the road built by the Columbia Turnpike and Road Company between Montgomery County and Baltimore in 1810. The road was managed by the Columbia Turnpike Company and later came to be known as the Columbia Pike, Old Columbia Road, and now U.S. Route 29. The Oakland Mills Blacksmith House and Shop was built around 1820. A sawmill, coopers shop and country store was built on a 16-acre (65,000 m^{2}) site prior to 1824. The Oakland Mills postal station opened on February 23, 1821, in the Howard district of Anne Arundel County. It operated until 1909, and the name was used again in 1974 when the land development company Rouse picked the name for one of its villages. The grist mill at Oakland Mills was built by Robert Oliver in 1826 on the site with the sawmill. On May 13, 1858, a tornado passed through the Oakland Mills town from Woodstock, Maryland, taking out large swaths of trees.

In 1969, the Rouse Company started land development, choosing Oakland Mills for the name of one of its "villages" to the east of the historic Oakland Mills site. The village was considered officially open on November 11, 1969, with the opening of the village center. Homebuilders from Amberly, Artery Leighton, Green, Page, and Ryland built model homes in the Stevens Forrest neighborhood with a random mix of architectural styles including Modern, Contemporary, Farm, and California style. In 1971, arsonists burned as many as ten new homes under construction, prompting residents to form community watches.

In 1987, the State of Maryland and Howard County approved a road widening which affected historic buildings at the Oakland Mills site. In 2011, the Blacksmith House was added to the National Register of Historic Places. The same year, the Maryland State Highway Administration commissioned a Maryland Historical Trust survey to include adjoining mill buildings declaring the site not eligible for state historical status because they "no longer effectively reflect their historic design or association with the historic mill site". County executive Ken Ulman broke ground at the project May 28, 2014, in front of the Mill Buildings announcing, "It means we can be more productive in our careers. It means we can get to our kids' practices and games on time. It means more quality time for families."

=== The bridge ===
A concrete footbridge was built over Route 29 in 1982 to connect Oakland Mills to the neighboring Columbia Town Center. In 2005, the county held a charrette to discuss redevelopment of the Rouse Planned Community beyond its initial 100,000 population design requiring the developer to conduct a study on the benefits of the footbridge. In 2010, The Downtown Columbia Plan passed, requiring the developer to fund a replacement footbridge as a condition before additional development could occur in Columbia. In 2010, The Rouse Company conducted a study, stating that there was little transportation benefit to the bridge. County Executive Ken Ulman proposed an unexpected $600,000 in county funds in the 2012 budget to relieve the developer of the bridge building expense and development restriction. In 2013, Howard County spent $100,000 to conduct its own study. In 2018, the bridge was renovated, with a new spiraling geometrical design, upgraded lighting, and safety enhancements.

== Names ==
Steven's Forest is named for the 702 acres (2.84 km^{2}) original land grant patented to Charles Stevens on May 10, 1709. The tract was resurveyed on August 4, 1746, by Phillip Hammond. The tract was only 90 acres (0.36 km^{2}) by 1783 when owned by Brice Hammond. In 1787, Major General of the 1st division of the Maryland State Infantry Charles Sterrett Ridgely, combined "Browns Adventure", "Chew's Angle", "Stevens Forest" and "Cost upon Cost" to form a 1,696-acre (6.86 km^{2}) tract for the Oakland Manor slave plantation.

Streets in Steven's Forest are named for works of John Dos Passos, F. Scott Fitzgerald, and Ernest Hemingway.

Talbott Springs comes from the name of the 1,087 acres (4.40 km^{2}) land grant, Talbott's Resolution Manor, patented on August 30, 1714, by John and Elizabeth Talbot, reduced to 249 acres (1.01 km^{2}) in 1783 by Rachel Ridgley. Street names are taken from the works of Carl Sandburg, and Ralph Waldo Emerson.

Thunder Hill derives from the name of the area farm of landowner Oliver Goldsmith who sold property to Rouse. The street names are from Andrew Wyeth. The street "Coonhunt Court" generated some controversy, without a direct reference to Wyeth's works; efforts to change the name started in 1969.

== Services ==
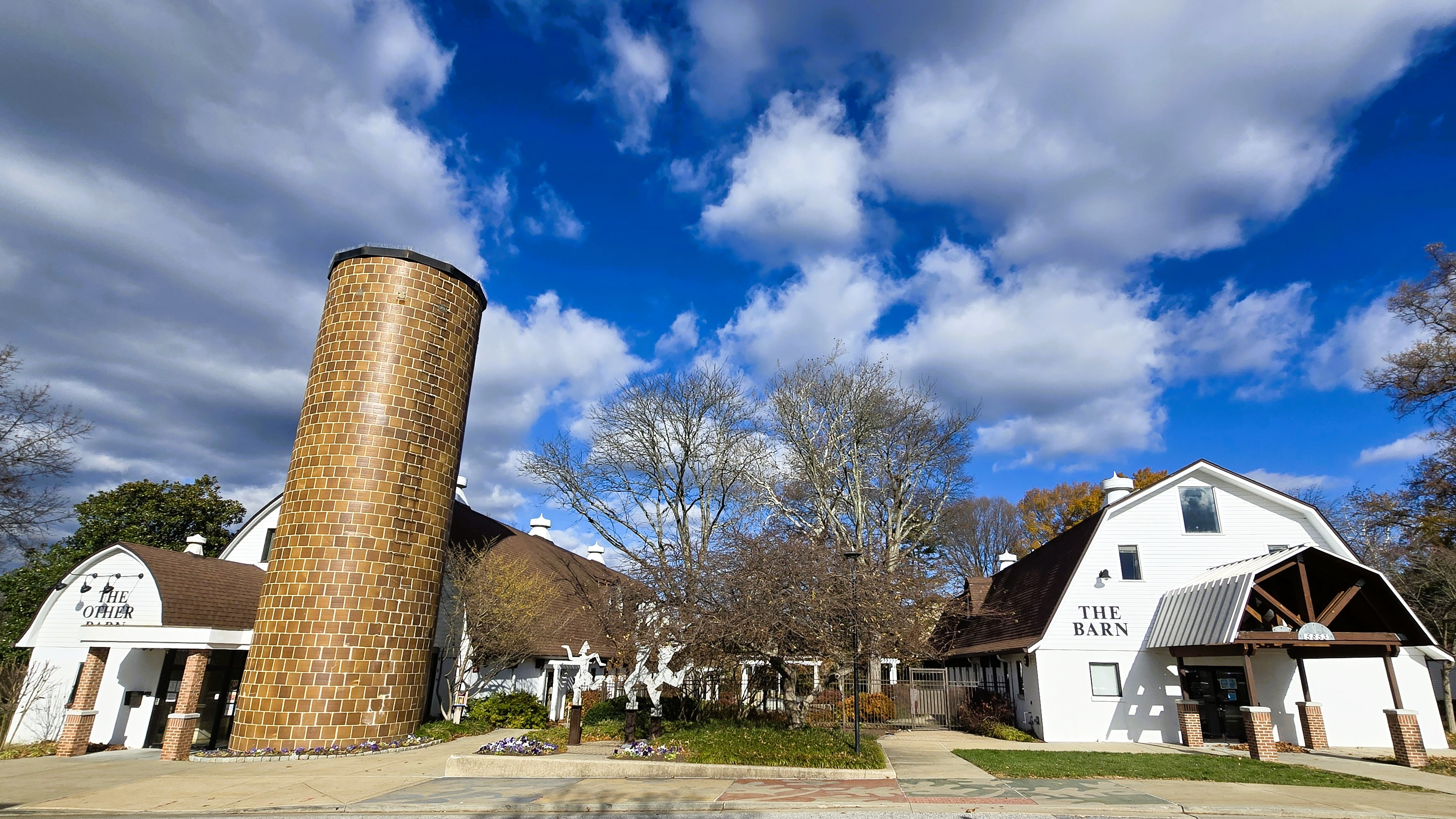
The Barn (right) and The Other Barn (left) at Oakland Mills Village Center

Oakland Mills Village Center contains an LA Mart ethnic grocery store and other smaller retail establishments including a Dunkin'. "The Meeting House," located at the village center, is an interfaith center.

The community center is in The Other Barn, which was built in 1947 to service 50 cattle by Dorsey Owings, once part of the Owings Dorsey Dairy Farm. It was repurposed by the Rouse company in 1969 as a community center and a teen center named the Orange Propeller.

Each neighborhood has an outdoor pool.

The Columbia Ice Rink and the Youth and Teen Center are also part of the Oakland Mills Village Center complex, administered by the Columbia Association.

== Government ==
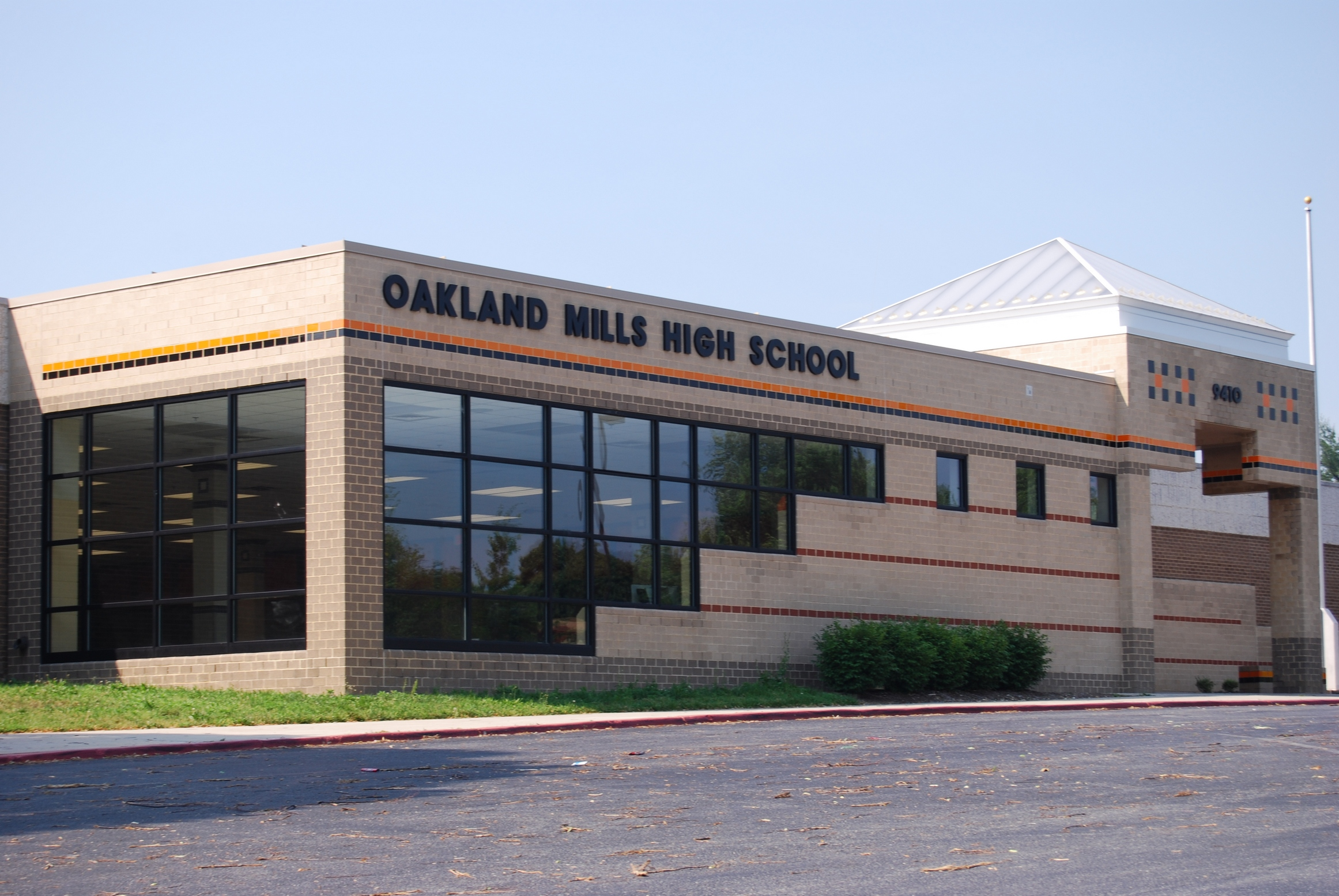
Oakland Mills High School

The Oakland Mills Community Association serves as the homeowner's association and village board of directors for Oakland Mills. Members of the village board serve one year terms and are elected annually. The board has up to seven members and includes the Oakland Mills representative to the Columbia Council as an ex-officio member. A Village Manager oversees day-to-day operations of the community association.

Jonathan Edelson is chairperson of the village board.

== Education ==
Oakland Mills High School is located in the village; students from Oakland Mills and neighboring communities attend. There are three elementary schools, Stevens Forest Elementary School, Thunder Hill Elementary School, and Talbott Springs Elementary School, and one middle school, Oakland Mills Middle School, within the village. Both Stevens Forest Elementary School and Talbott Springs Elementary School have been recognized as National PTA Schools of Excellence.

== See also ==
- Oakland Mills Blacksmith House and Shop
