= Sara Lindsey =

American actress

Sara Lindsey (born Washington, D.C., United States of America) is an American actress best known for playing surgical assistant Gracie opposite Will Smith in the 2015 biopic film Concussion.

== Early life and career ==
Born in Washington, Lindsey was raised in Ellicott City, Maryland as the youngest of four children to two physicians. She attended Wilde Lake High School in nearby Columbia, followed by the Carnegie Mellon School of Drama where she graduated with a Bachelor of Fine Arts degree in Acting.

Starting with Super 8 in 2011 she had extra and bit part roles in various films including Won't Back Down, Fun Size, Promised Land and Jack Reacher. Her biggest role thus far came in 2015's Concussion where she played supporting character Gracie.

She currently lives in Los Angeles.
