= Oakland Manor =

Historic house in Maryland, United States

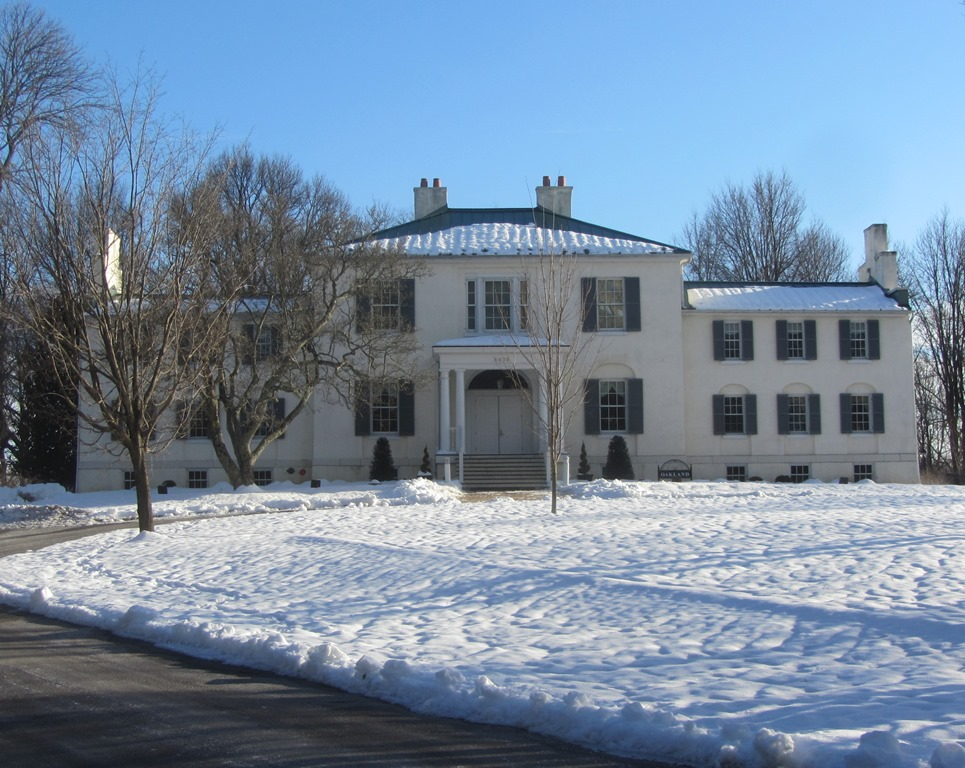
- Oakland Manor
- Interactive map of the Oakland Manor area

General information
- Location: 5430 Vantage Point Road, Columbia, Maryland;
- Coordinates: 39.222274°N 76.855709°W
- Completed: 1811

Height
- Roof: Standing seam metal

Design and construction
- Architect: Abraham Lerew

Oakland or Oakland Manor is a Federal style stone manor house commissioned in 1810 by Charles Sterrett Ridgely in the Howard District of Anne Arundel County, Maryland (now Howard County). The lands that became Oakland Manor were patented by John Dorsey as "Dorsey's Adventure" in 1688 which was willed to his grandson Edward Dorsey. In 1785, Luther Martin purchased properties named "Dorsey's Adventure", "Dorsey's Inheritance", "Good for Little", "Chew's Vineyard", and "Adam the First" to make the 2300 acre "Luther Martin's Elkridge Farm".

== Background ==
In 1785, John Sterrett purchased 1,626 wooded acres with several buildings named "Felicity" from Mathias Hammond, a participant in the 1774 sinking of the Peggy Stewart. Sterrett died two years later, with his wife Deborah Ridgely Sterrett selling 567 acres of the property to their son Charles Sterrett Ridgely, and 533 acres to his brother James Sterrett. Charles Sterrett Ridgely was born Charles Ridgely Sterrett, but changed his name to inherit from his maternal great uncle. He was a graduate of St. Johns College in 1802, a future Speaker of the Maryland House of Delegates, and commissioned the manor house in June 1810. The house was completed in 1811 including a 100 ft-long stone carriage house.

To the east of the Manor, a grist mill was built which stayed in production until being demolished by fire in 1890. The site known as "Oakland Mills" served as a postal stop, and the name was later used for one of the Rouse development company villages.

Charles Sterrett Ridgely forfeited the house in 1826, selling it to Robert Oliver for $47,000 after failing to make payments toward the property. His son Thomas Oliver purchased the manor, expanding it to 775 acres by adding "Talbot's Resolution Manor", "Howard's Fair and Amicable Settlement", "Josephs Gift", "Dorseys Search Resurveyed" and "Dorseys Search". Stone outbuildings with a capability for 1200 bushels of ice were constructed. He sold it for $58,459.95 in 1838 to George Riggs Gaither, who operated the manor as a productive slave plantation producing wheat, corn, oats and hay. The nearby "Oakland Mill" operated as "Gaither's Mill". A small granite quarry was also operated by the plantation. George Riggs Gaither built the stone "Bleak House" on the property for his son, George Riggs Gaither Jr. As the civil war approached, Gaither formed "Gaithers Raiders" part of the "Howard County Dragoons", sixty men which practised at Oakland Manor prior to becoming a confederate army unit furnished by Governor Thomas Holliday Hicks. The troops marched on 19 April 1861 through Ellicott City to Baltimore, responding to the Baltimore riot of 1861, before heading South to join J. E. B. Stuart.

In October 1862, six Union troops from New Jersey raided the Oakland Manor as a Southern sympathizing plantation with the owners joining the Confederate Army. The farm was sold again after the Civil War to Phillip and Katherine Tabb who switched from slave farming to raising thoroughbreds with a half-mile oval track situated along Columbia pike. In 1874, Katherine Tabb's father Francis Morris of New York purchased Oakland, testing corn silage and trenching techniques that gave Oakland an agricultural engineering status from the American Society of Agricultural and Biological Engineers. Five trench 117 ft long silos were put to use onsite. In 1877, Morris began a significant grounds improvement program removing Hawthorn hedges and replacing them with wood fencing throughout the property manufactured at the Oakland Mills sawmill.

The property had been subdivided to 406 acres in 1909 by owner Thomas Findlay, who removed the racetrack. Oakland was reduced to 350 acres by 1921 with one 8-room tenant house. From 1950 to 1966 the property was operated by Miriam J. Keller as the Oakland Manor Health Farm. After divorce proceedings, the property became the most important land purchase for Rouse Company development project of Columbia. Attorney Bernard F. Goldberg negotiated the deal early in his career before his prison term for misappropriation of land development funds. In 1966, the Rouse Company purchased Oakland and used it as temporary headquarters, then leased it to Antioch College and Dag Hammarskjöld college. By 1976, The property surrounding Oakland Manor was reduced to 8.26 acres. The building was leased to the Red Cross from 1977 to 1988. In 1988, Rouse divested itself of the property maintenance by selling Oakland to the Columbia Association for $185,000. The same year, the association leased 1060sf of the former slave plantation to the African Art Museum of Maryland.

== Outbuildings ==
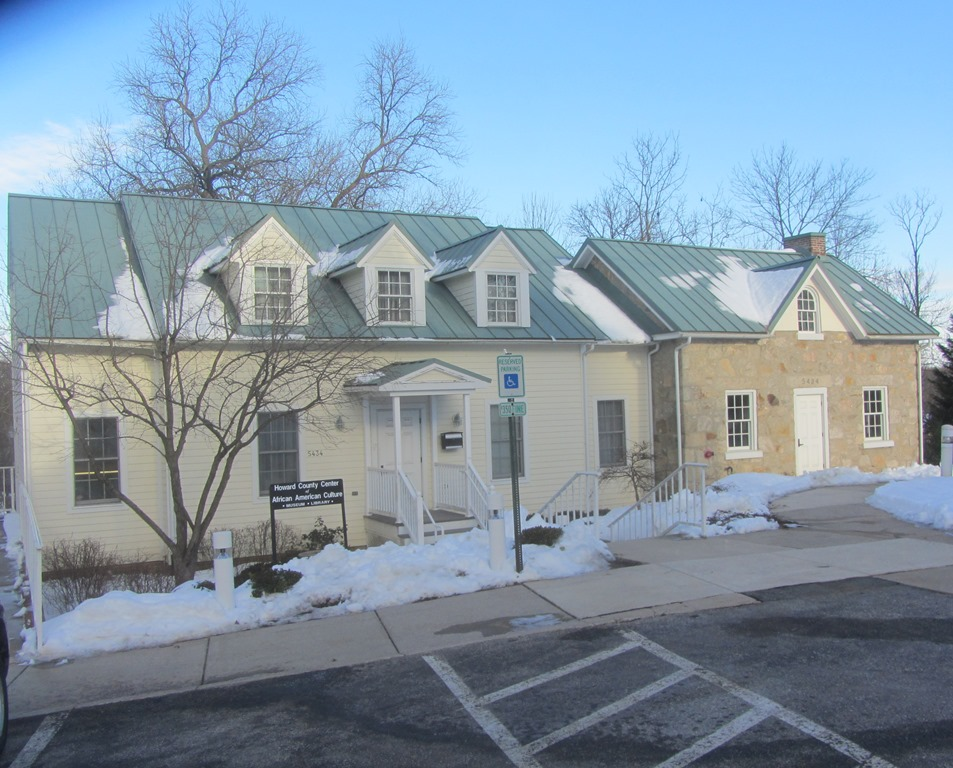
Howard County Center of African American Culture

- Howard County Center of African American Culture -located in an outbuilding adjacent to the manor.

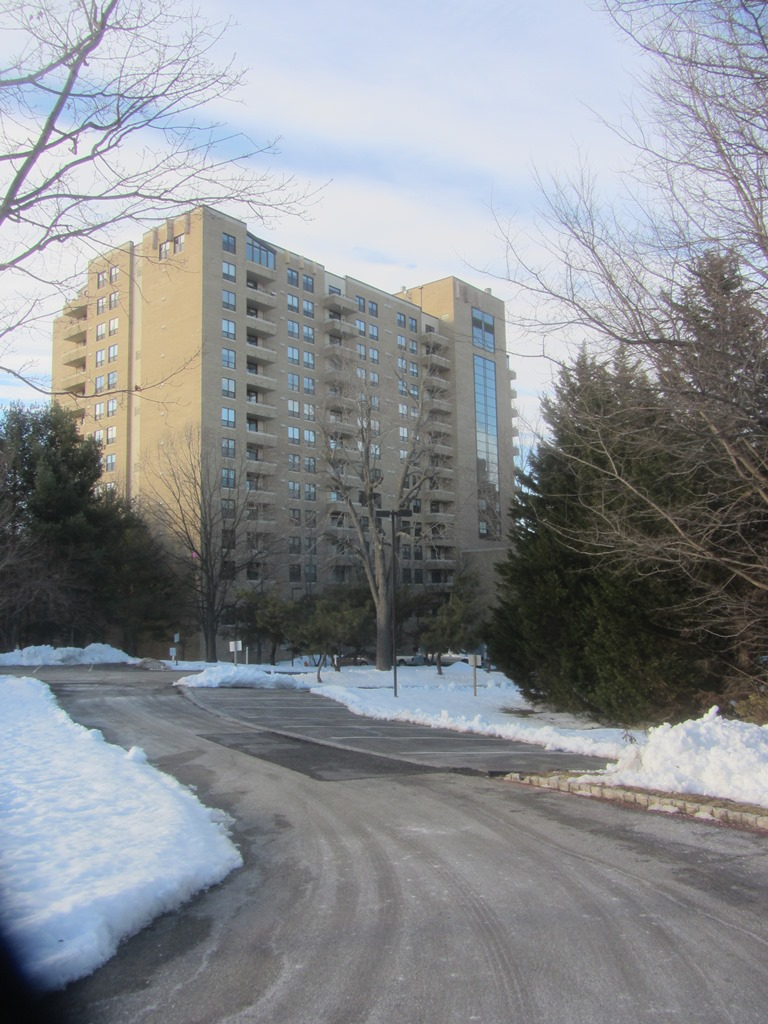
Vantage House – built over demolished remains of the 18th-century Stone House "Eye of the Camel"

- Stone House "Eye of the Camel" – A 1 1/2-story eighteenth-century granite stone house located just north of the manor house. Used as a manor overseer residence. After purchase by the Rouse company, the building was converted to an art studio called "Eye of the camel" and kept in good repair through the 1980s. The building was later destroyed to build the Vantage House retirement community highrise in 1990.

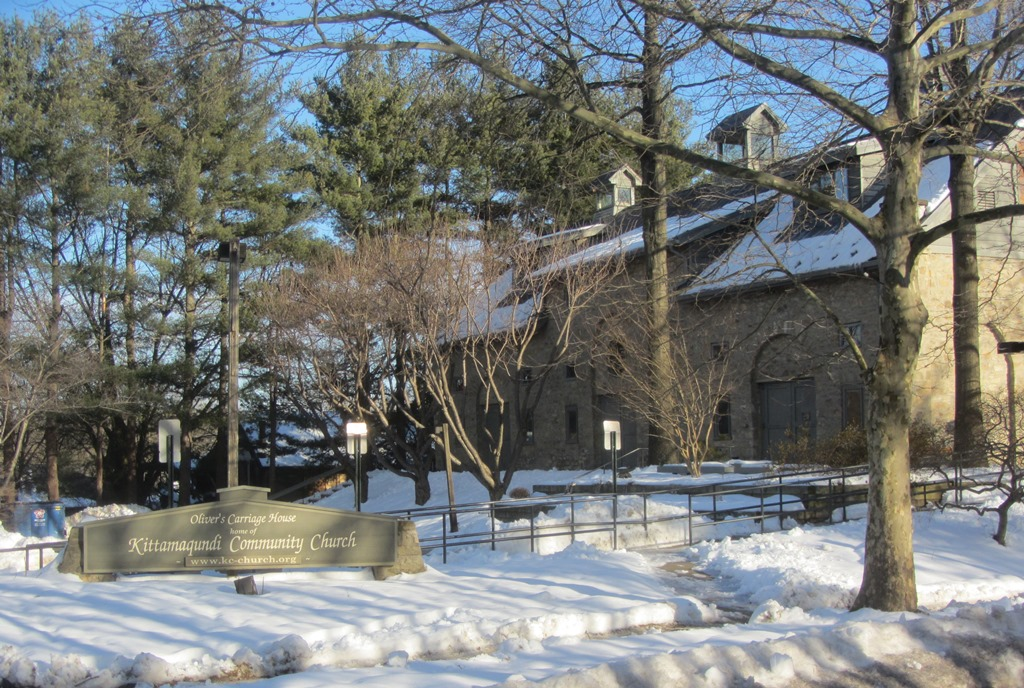
Oliver's Carriage House, converted to Kittamaqundi Community Church

- Oakland Stable, The Carriage House, Oliver's Carriage House – An 18th century stone carriage house and stable servicing the Oakland manor. Occupied by the Kittamaqundi Community for a church on May 26, 1972. Building substantially renovated in 1977. The Kittamaqundi Community Church officially changed the building's name to The Carriage House on June 20, 2021, to avoid perpetuating the name of slaveholders (the Olivers).
- Blacksmith Shop (or Ralston Cottage) – Built around 1840, two stone L-shaped buildings formed the blacksmith shop, situated to the northeast of the manor house, on the shore of the man-made Wilde Lake at 10102 Hyla Brook Road. The building utilized as the first new post office to serve the Rouse development. In 1981, building was purchased from Patricia Kittleman by her son Bruno Reich. Reich performed a $600,000 expansion, and clad the home with stone from the 1846 Moundland house in Guilford, Maryland that was demolished in 1990 to make way for the South Columbia Baptist Church.
- The Oakland Manor slave quarters are also on Hyla Brook Road. The stone building predates Oakland Manor and was used in later years as a tenant house. A tunnel connects the building to the Old Oakland Manor House.
- Old Oakland Manor (also called Ralston Cottage) – A stone building predating Oakland Manor built in 1750 residing on modern 10026 Hyla Brook Road. Assumed to be the garrison for George Gaither's troops.
- Oakland Barn (Wilde Lake Barn) - A two-story structure likely constructed in the first part of the 20th century. The original structure on this site, whose foundation may be preserved, dates from some 100 years earlier. Listed as a historic landmark in 1976 by the American Society of Agricultural and Biological Engineers. There is also an adjacent springhouse.
- Sheep House – Stone building used for sheep, currently used as a Wilde Lake Boat House.
- Bryant Woods Building – Stone building demolished to build Bryant Woods Subdivision.
- Oakland Mills / Gaithers Mill; A onsite stone mill downstream of Oakland Manor along the Columbia Turnpike with an 1880 production of 450 barrels of wheat flour, 32,400 lb of corn meal, and 43,300 lb of feed. Paved over by Route 29 expansions

== Ownership Timeline ==
- 1785 John Sterrett Ridgley
- 1787 Charles Sterrett Ridgley
- 1826 Robert Oliver (1757–1834); Robert was a director of the B&O Railroad and Maryland Insurance Company with holdings that included the Oakland Mill– Added pre-civil war vintage leaded glass windows to the manor.
- 1834 Thomas Oliver, sold the 587 acres estate for $84 an acre in October 1838.
- 1838 George Riggs Gaither
- 1864 Philip and Katherine Tabb
- 1874 Frances Morris – Introduced silage trenches
- 1906 John V Finday – Electrified the house
- 1923–1934 Vacant after mortgage default.
- 1934 Alpheus Ryan
- 1950 Price Family – Operated as Nursing Home
- 1966 Purchased by the Rouse Company – Used as Howard County Red Cross Headquarters
- 1976 Columbia Service Property Inc. (Rouse Company)
- 1977 Red Cross Lease
- 1988 Columbia Association

== See also ==
- List of Howard County properties in the Maryland Historical Trust
- Oakland Mills Blacksmith House and Shop
- Luther Martin
- Arlington slave plantation
- Oakland Mills, Columbia, Maryland
