= Oakland Mills Blacksmith House and Shop =

Historic house in Maryland, United States

- U.S. National Register of Historic Places
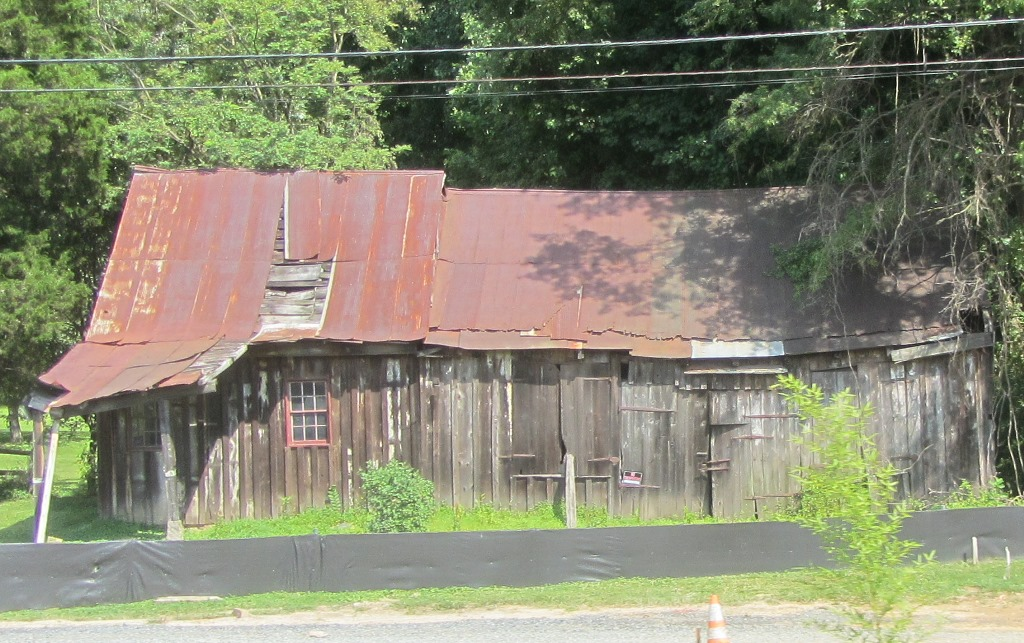
- Blacksmith Shop, June 2014

- Location within Maryland Location within the United States
- Location: 5471 Old Columbia Road, Oakland Mills, Maryland
- Coordinates: 39°13′17″N 76°50′51″W
- Area: 2 acres (0.81 ha)
- Built: c. 1844
- NRHP reference No.: 11000820
- Added to NRHP: November 18, 2011

The Oakland Mills Blacksmith House and Shop, also known as Felicity, is a historic property at 5471 Old Columbia Road in Oakland Mills, Maryland.

== Buildings ==
The Columbia Road was contracted on January 6, 1810, by the Maryland General Assembly to establish a toll road from Ellicott City to Georgetown. The property includes a 1.5-story wood-frame house, built c. 1820, a single-story blacksmithy, a smokehouse, and the remains of a spring house. The buildings are set close to the south side of the road. The house was built by the Ridgely family, who owned the original Oakland Mills flour mill complex that appeared on the Anne Arundel County tax list in 1798. The wood stable was used to raise Percheron workhorses for local farms. Both the house and smithy are extremely well preserved; the smithy, which ceased operation in 1950, houses one complete forge and parts of a second.

== Subsequent owners ==
In 1878, Samuel F. Whipps (1831–1909) moved from his father William Whipps' house at "Rebecca's Lot" (now Whipps Family and Public Cemetery) to Felicity. He operated the Oakland Mills post office and blacksmith shop with his son William Whipps. Future Circuit Court Judge James A. Clark Sr. worked for a Mr. Whipps on-site in the late 1800s. The property was later purchased by a Mr. and Mrs. Frank Collins. Most recently the property has been purchased by Genevieve Engleman, who resides there.

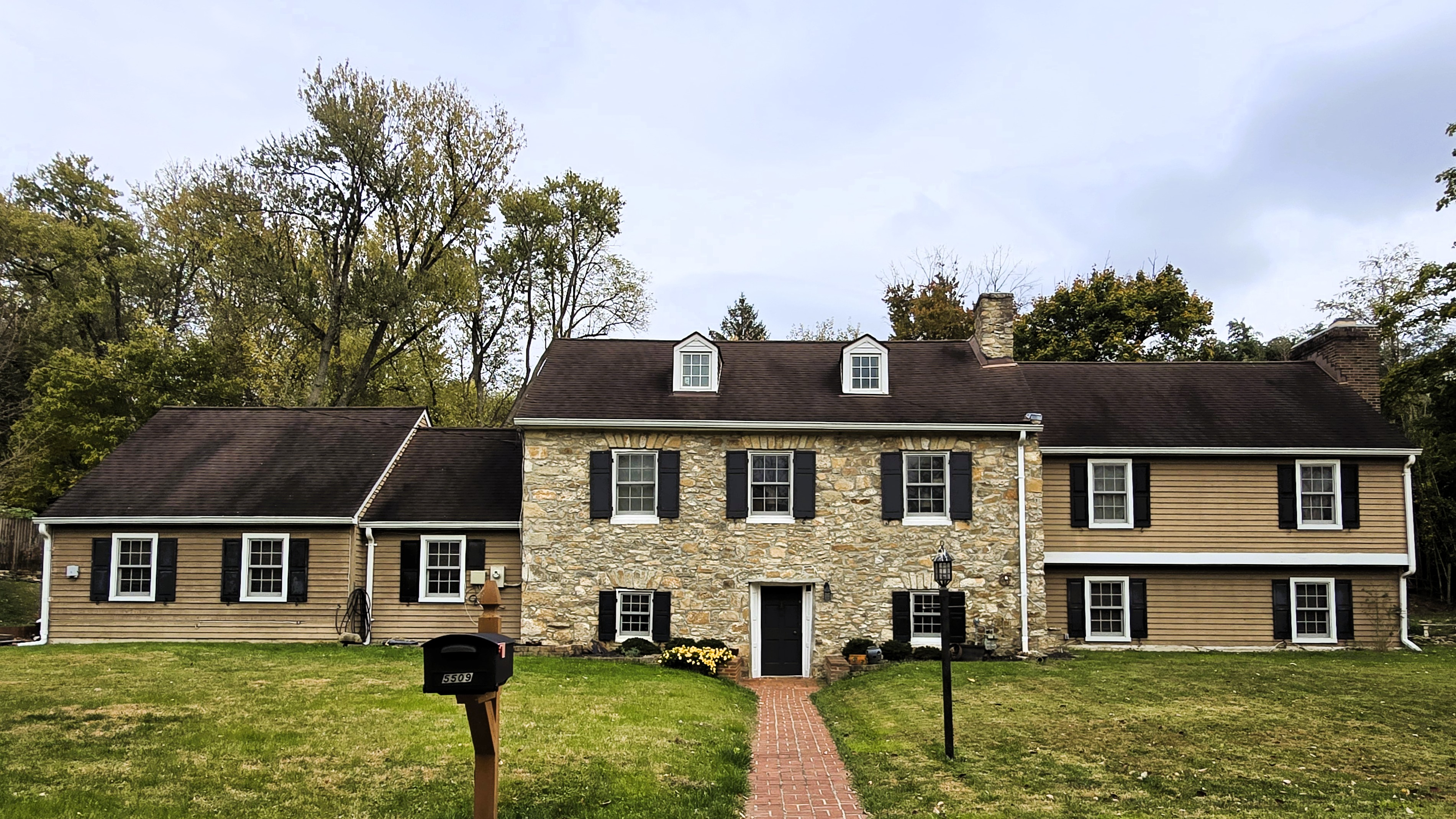
Adjacent Oakland Mills Store and Dwelling. Circa 1798

== 21st century ==
The property was listed on the National Register of Historic Places in 2011. A 2001 book, Roads to Howard's Past, boasted about the Maryland Department of Transportation circumventing the historic properties, but by 2014 the historic register was changed to declare the property was not historic. County Executive Ken Ulman was part of the 2010 groundbreaking for a road-widening project in front of the historic structures. The project to increase traffic capacity and develop extra density in downtown Columbia reduced the property size, relocated Old Columbia Pike, and installed sound walls.

== Gallery ==
2016

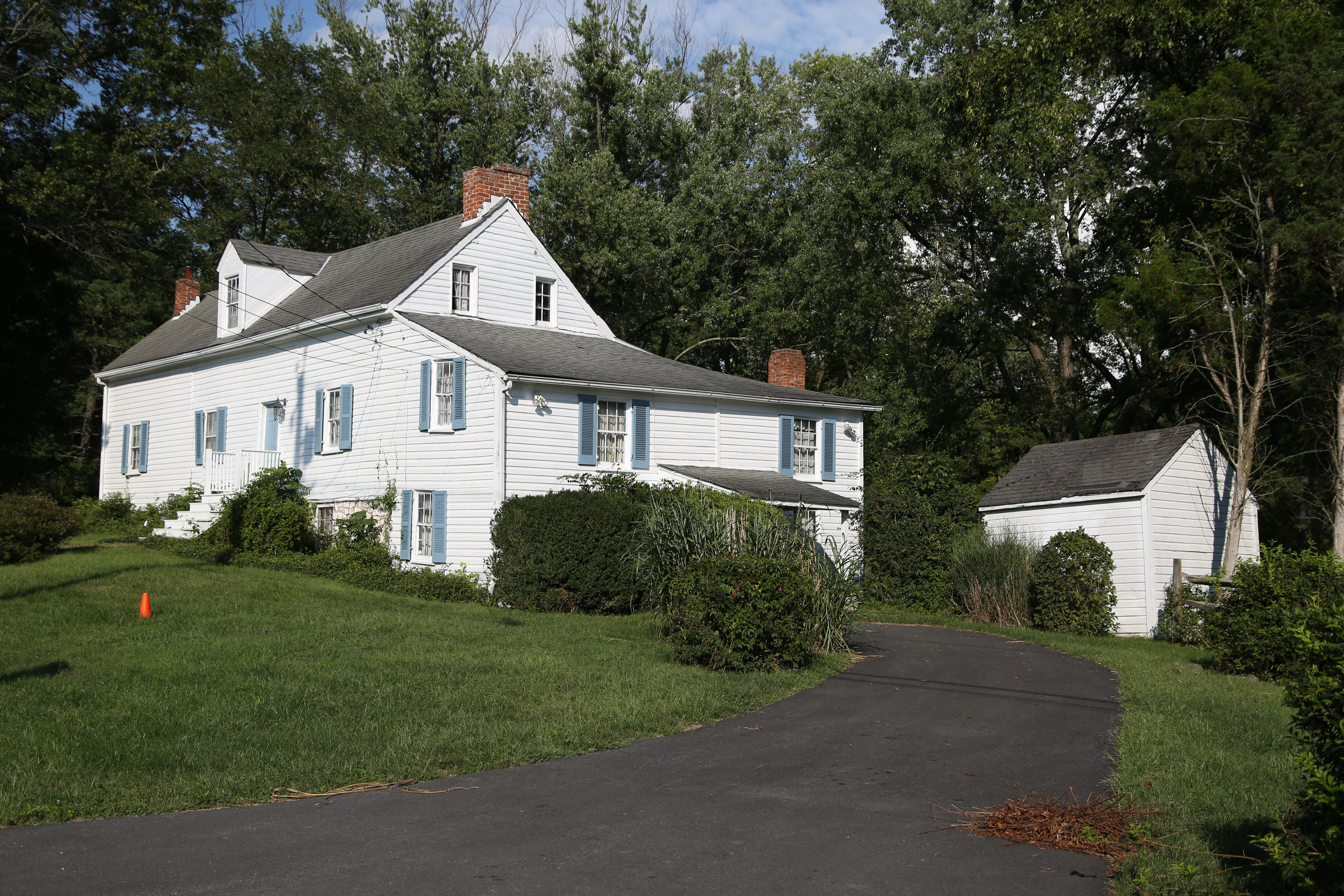
Oakland Mills Blacksmith House Front

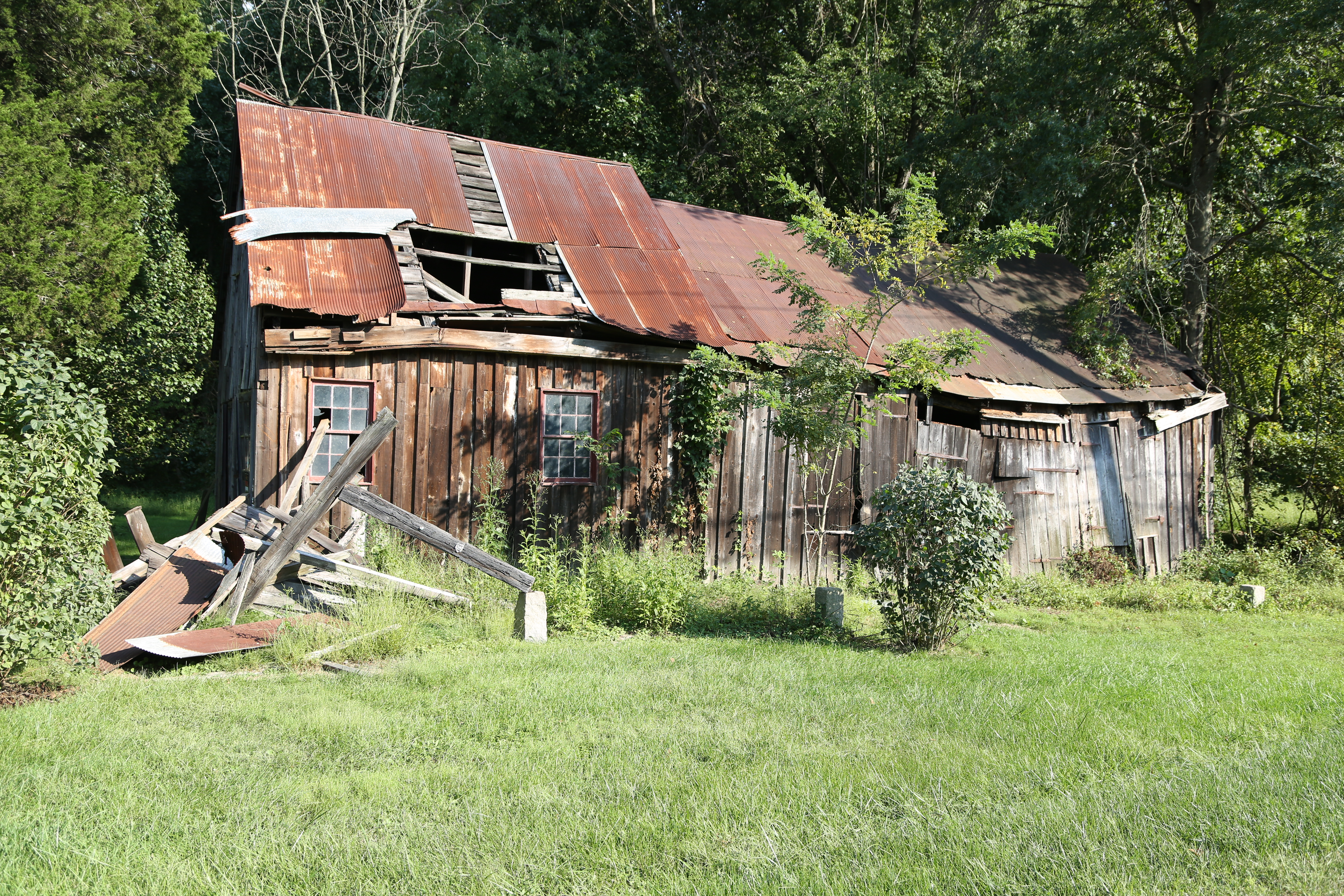
Oakland Mills Blacksmith Shop Front

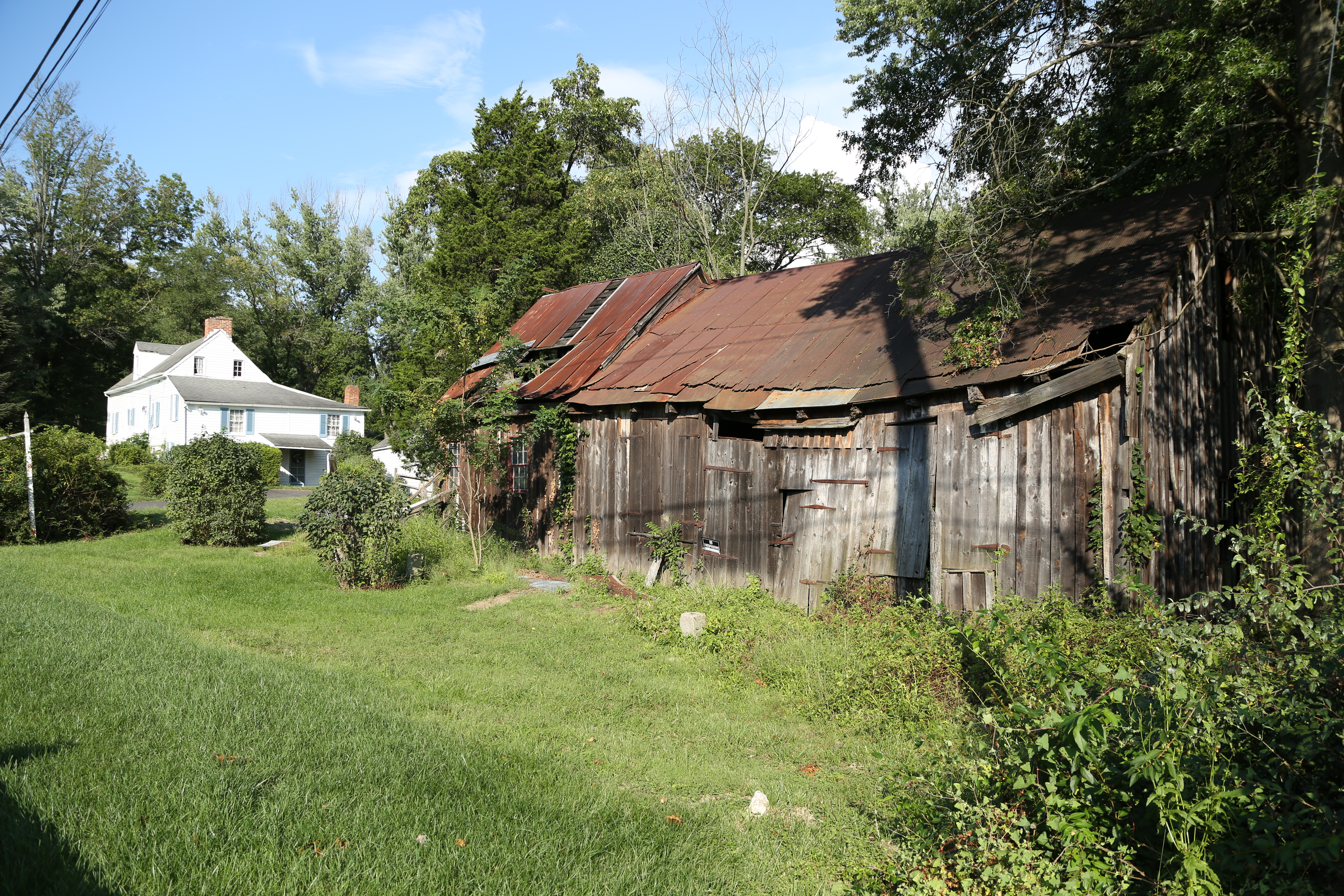
Oakland Mills Blacksmith House and Shop Front Together

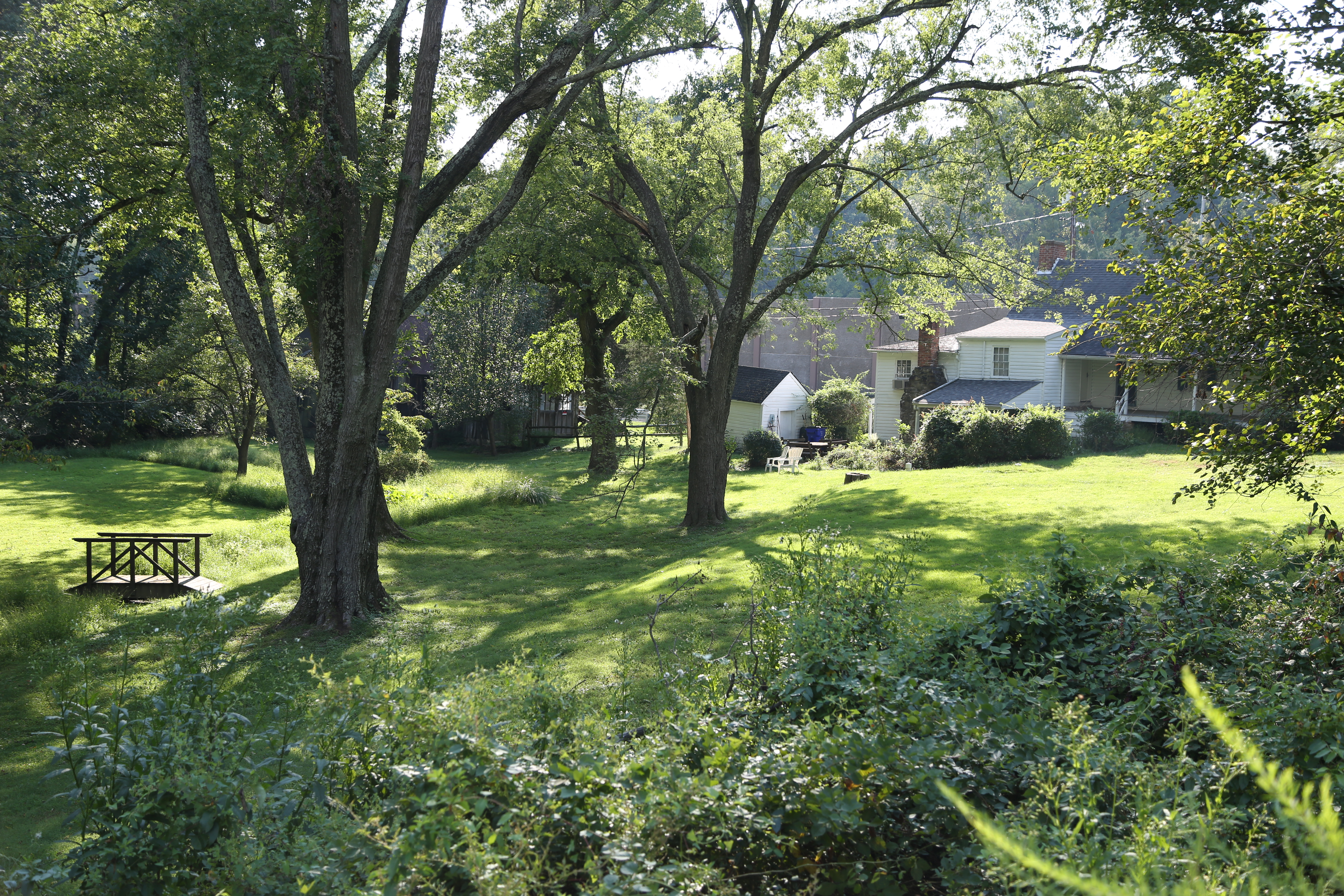
Oakland Mills Blacksmith House and Shop Behind

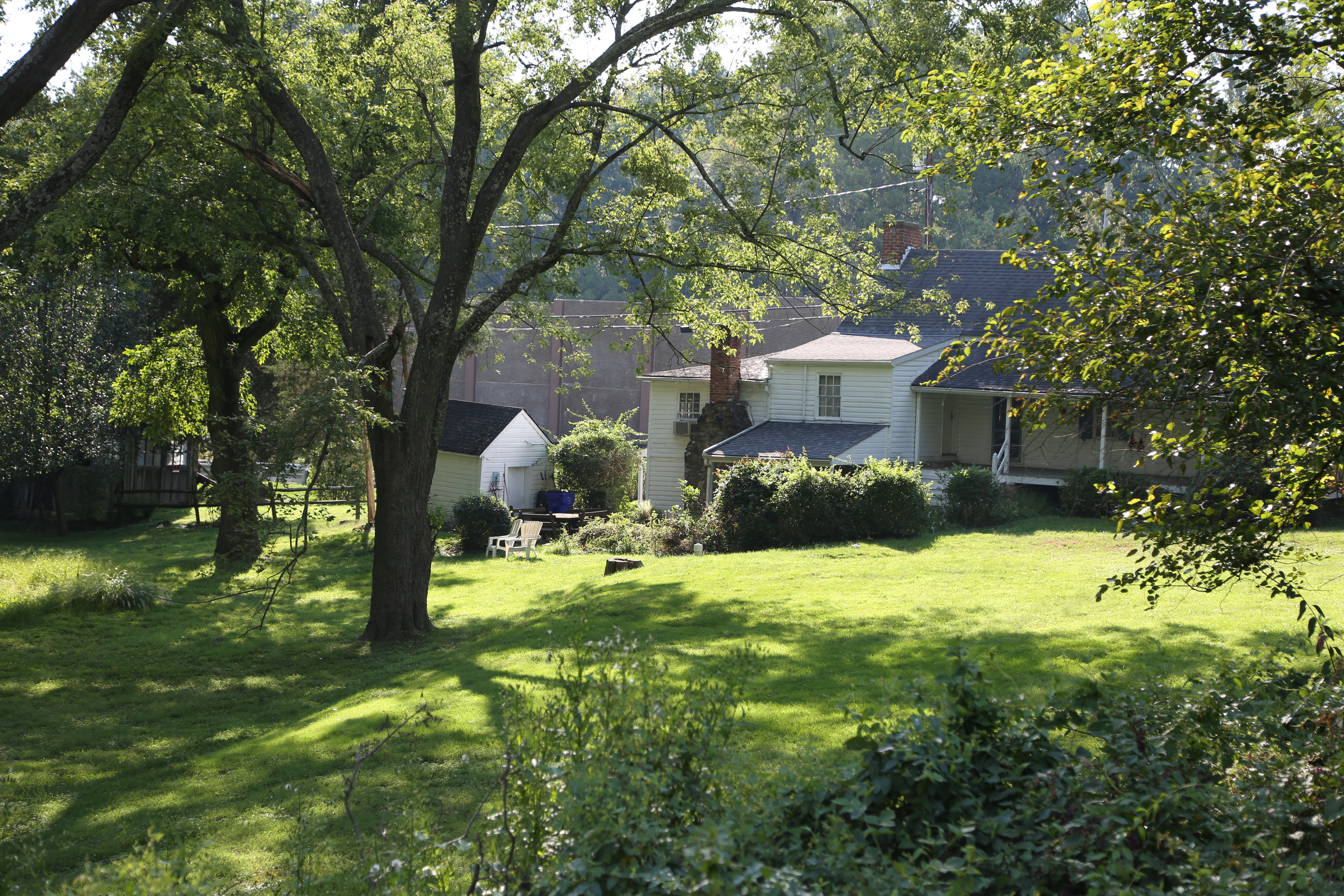
Oakland Mills Blacksmith House and Shop Behind 2

2025

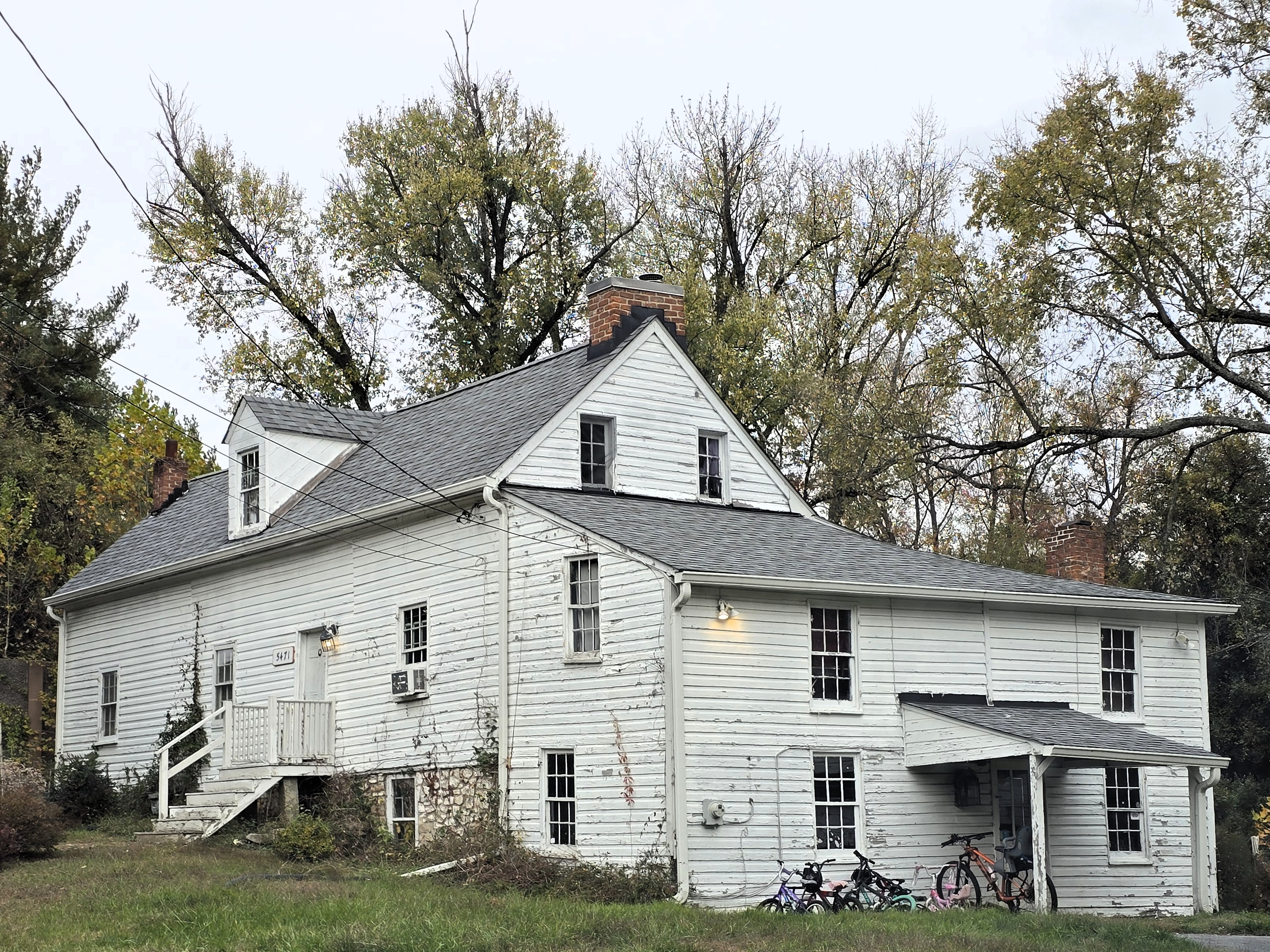
Oakland Mills Blacksmith House in October 2025

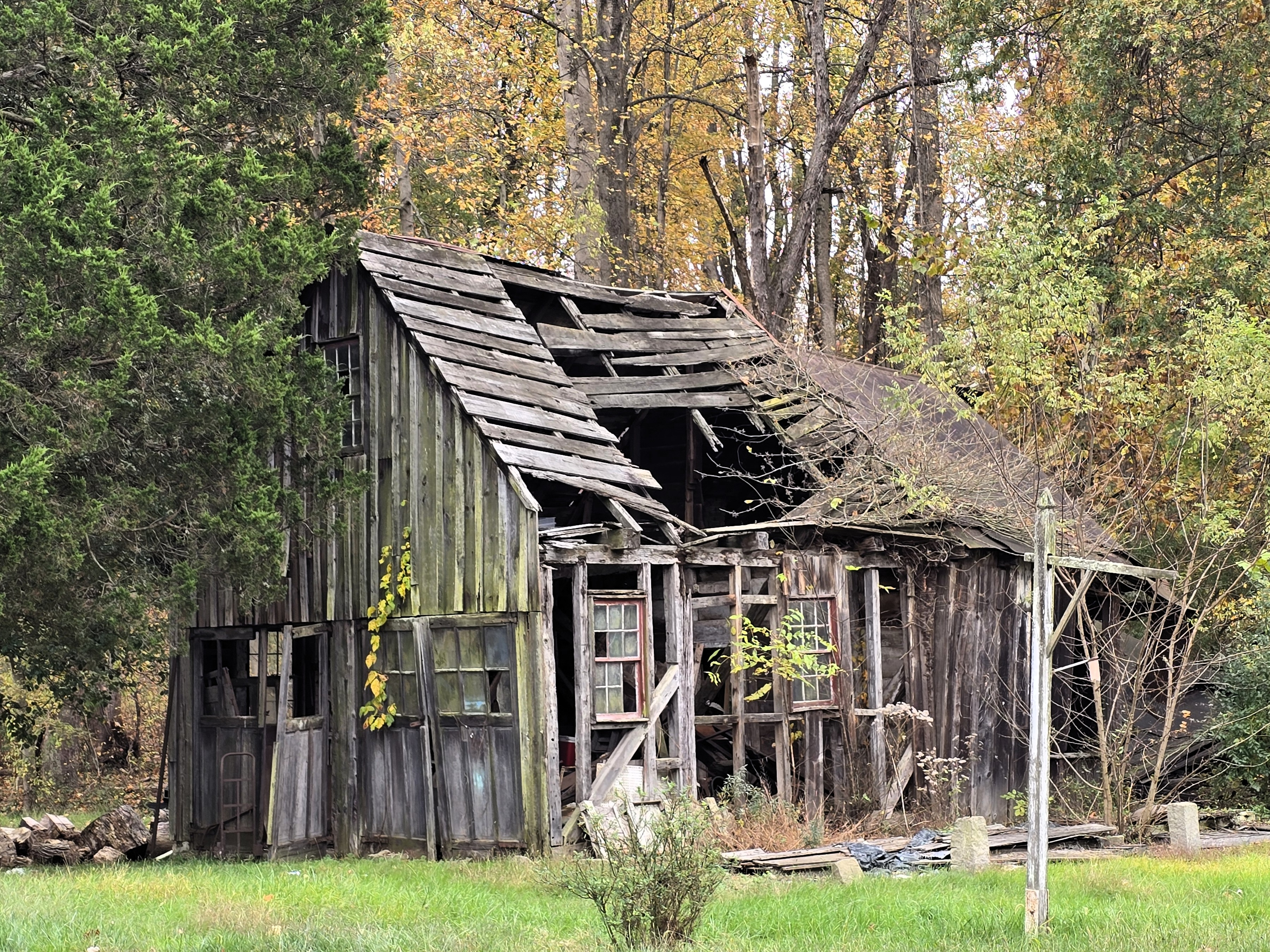
Oakland Mills Blacksmith Shop in October 2025

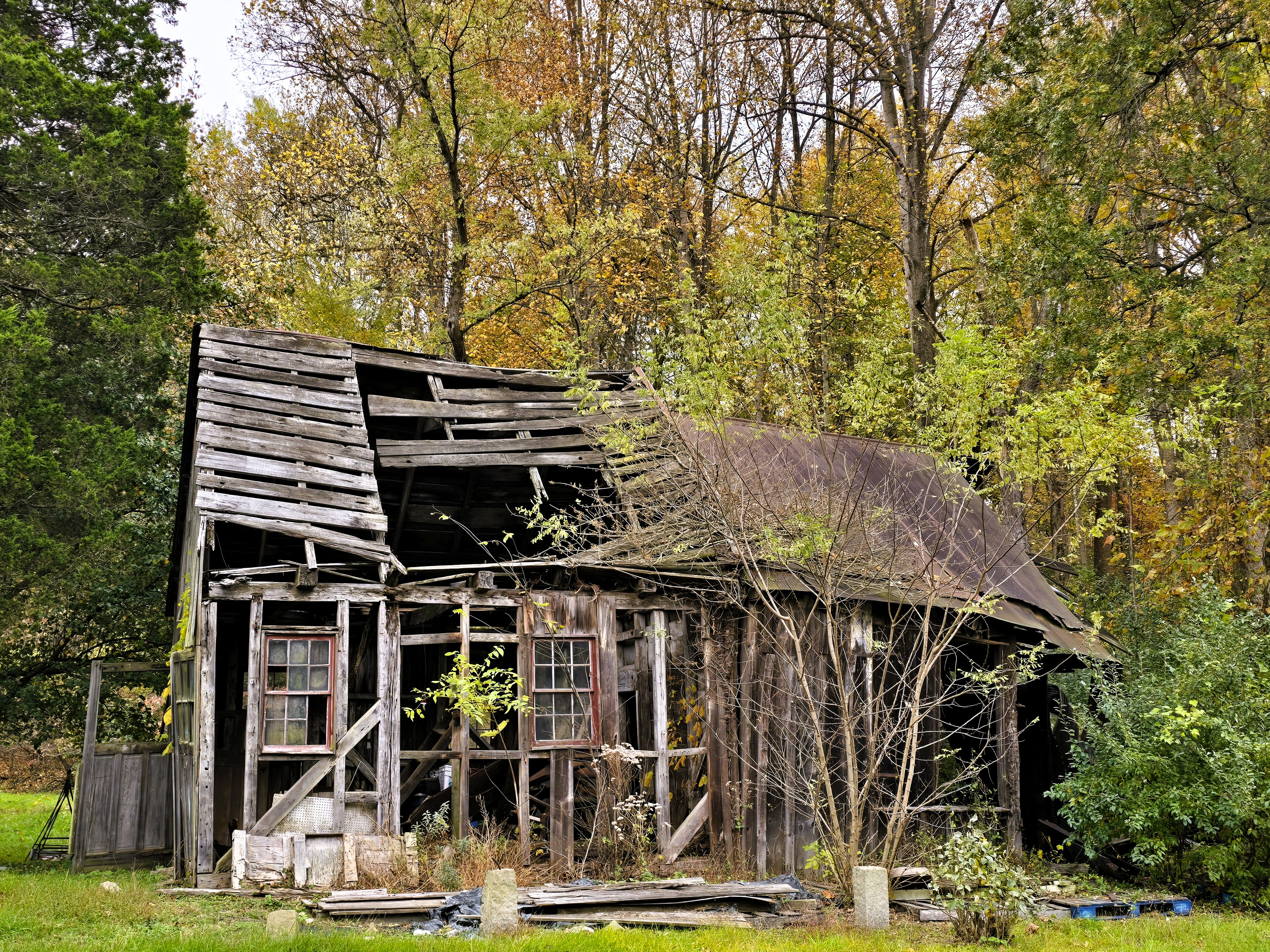
Oakland Mills Blacksmith Shop in October 2025

== See also ==
- Oakland Manor
