= Charles Sterrett Ridgely =

American land developer and legislator (1781–1847)

Speaker of the Maryland House of Delegates
- In office 1838–1839
- Preceded by: William Hallam Tuck
- Succeeded by: James Wray Williams
- In office 1840–1841
- Preceded by: James Wray Williams
- Succeeded by: Daniel S. Biser

Personal details
- Born: c. 1781
- Died: January 5, 1847
- Spouse: Elizabeth Ruth Hollingsworth
- Children: Randolf Ridgley, John Sterrett Ridgely (August 9, 1809), Sally Ridgely wife of Gov William Grayson), Andrew Sterrett Ridgely
- Parent(s): John Sterrett; Deborah Ridgley
- Education: St. John's College
- Known for: Major in the Maryland Militia

Charles Sterrett Ridgely (c. 1781 – 5 January 1847) was an American land developer and legislator.

== Biography ==
Charles Sterrett Ridgely was born around 1781. His parents were John Sterrett a privateer, and Deborah Ridgley. His father purchased 1,696 acres patented as Felicity from Mathias Hammond settling in what is now Howard County Maryland. Charles Sterrett graduated St. Johns College in 1802. In June 1810 Charles purchased 567 acres of the family estate from his mother and commissioned Oakland Manor, which is situated in the center of the current Rouse Company land development project Columbia.

Changing his last name from Sterrett to Ridgely to be in line for inheritance of his great uncle's estate (Capt. Charles Ridgely of Hampton), Charles accumulated 2,300 acres of land. He served as a Major in the Maryland Militia in the War of 1812. In 1824-25, he was assigned as a Colonel of a horse troop to protect General Lafayette. He was a member of the Maryland House of Delegates in 1834-1836 and 1838-1841. He was elected speaker of the house in 1838, 1840 and 1841. His son Randolf Ridgley served in the Mexican–American War, taking command after the death of Samuel Ringgold.
