= Howard County Public School System =

Public school district in Maryland, U.S.

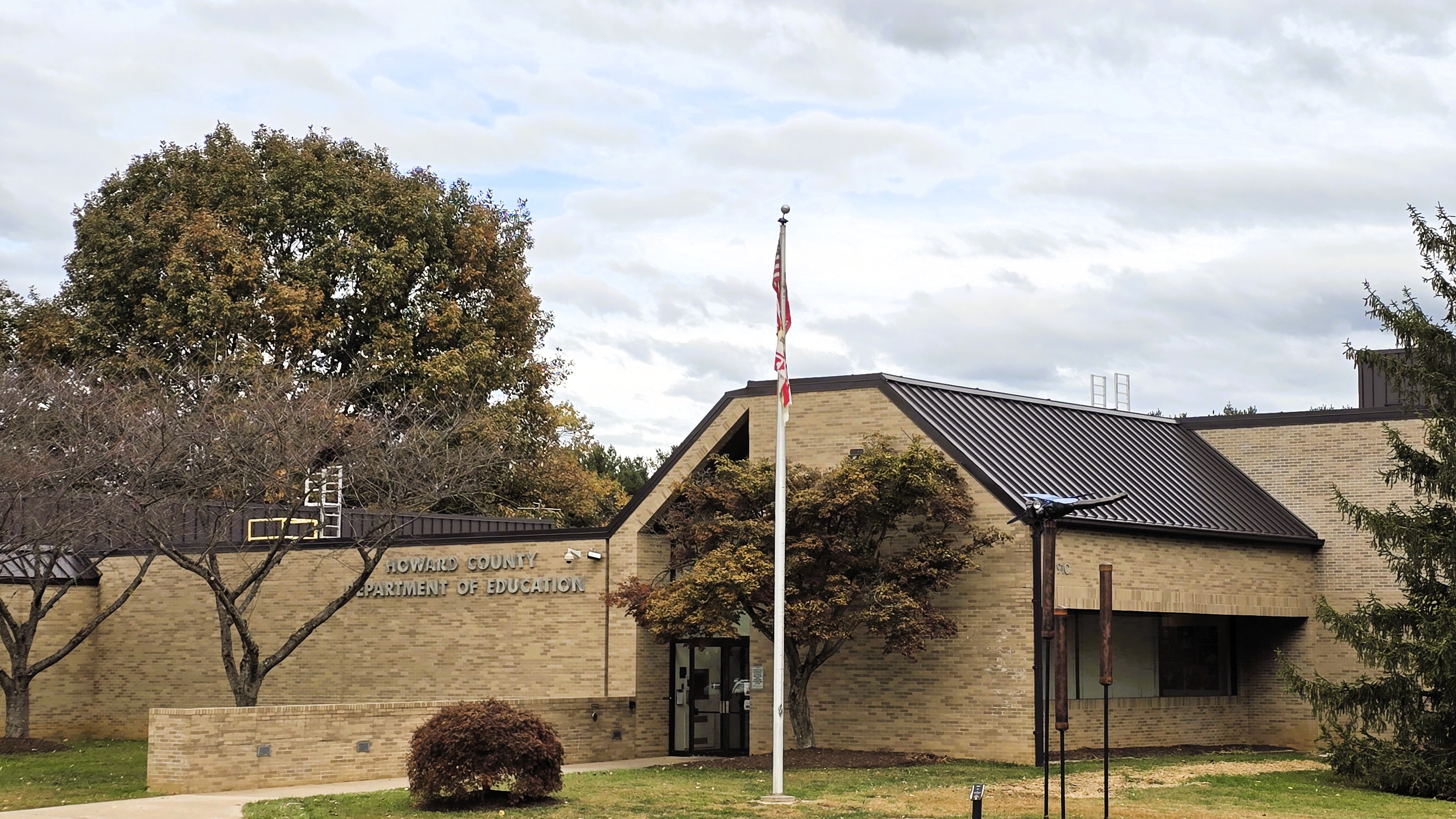
- Howard County Public School System headquarters

Location
- Columbia, Maryland United States

District information
- Type: Public
- Grades: PreK–12
- Superintendent: William J. Barnes
- Asst. superintendent(s): Karalee Turner-Little
- Chair of the board: Jennifer Mallo
- Schools: 78
- Budget: $942.6 million (FY 2022)
- NCES District ID: 2400420

Students and staff
- Enrollment: 57,565
- Teachers: 4,774
- Staff: 9,177
- Student–teacher ratio: 12:1

Other information
- Website: https://www.hcpss.org

The Howard County Public School System (HCPSS) is the school district that manages and runs the public schools of Howard County, Maryland. It operates under the supervision of an elected, eight-member Board of Education. Jennifer Mallo is the chair of the board. William J. Barnes has served as the superintendent since July 1, 2024.

The district operates 78 schools: 42 elementary schools, 20 middle schools, 13 high schools, and 3 special education schools/education centers. As of September 2024, a total of 57,565 students were enrolled. It is headquartered in the Columbia, Maryland census-designated place; the facility has an Ellicott City mailing address.

Howard County consistently earns high marks in school performance metrics such as test scores and graduation rates. It gets high percentages at all levels of the Maryland School Assessments. In 2007, Forbes magazine rated Howard County as one of the ten most cost-efficient school systems in the United States.

== Overview ==
The district includes the entire county limits.

=== Howard County Board of Education members ===
As of October 2025:

- Jennifer Mallo, chair, District 4 (2018–present)
- Meg Ricks, vice chair, District 1 (2024–present)
- Jacky McCoy, at-large (2022–present)
- Dr. Linfeng Chen, at-large (2022–present)
- Antonia Watts, District 2 (2020–present)
- Jolene Mosley, District 3 (2020–present)
- Andrea Chamblee, District 5 (2024–present)
- Gavin Falcon, student member (2026–present)

=== Enrollment ===
For SY 2025-26 As of September 2025

- Elementary (PreK–5) – 25,283
- Middle (6–8) – 13,163
- High (9–12) – 18,342
- Special Schools – 243

Student race/ethnicity (2024–2025 school year)
Race/ethnicity	Percentage
White	30.3%
African American / Black	24.8%
Asian	23.7%
Hispanic / Latino	13.9%
Two or more races	6.8%
Other	≤ 5%

=== Attendance rate ===
(2021–2022 school year)

- All grades = greater than or equal to 93.5%

=== Graduation rate ===
94.59% for class of 2022. 4-year adjusted cohort.

== Howard County education history ==
=== Early education ===
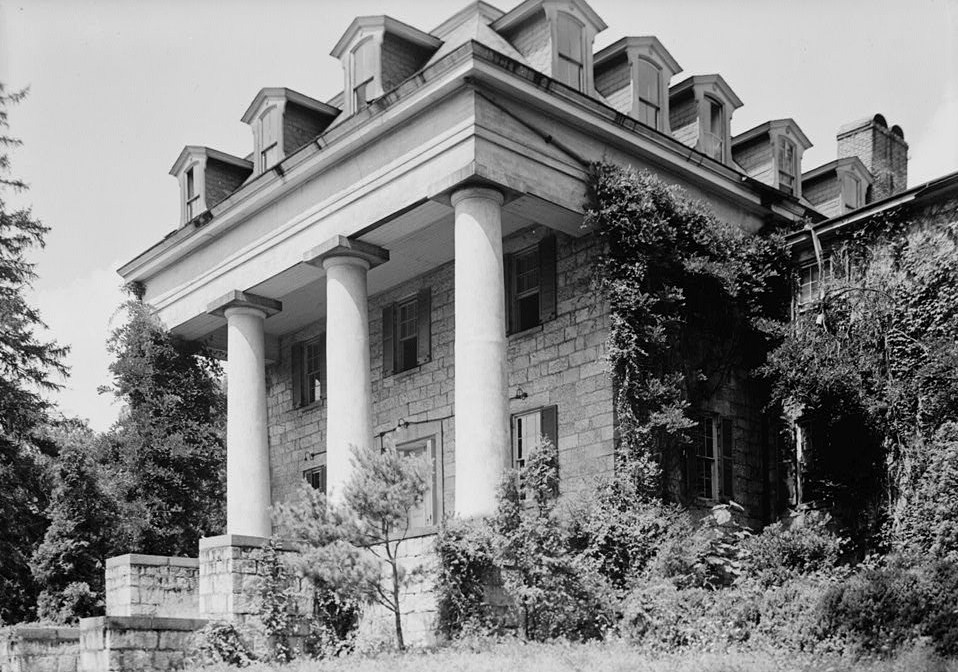
The Patapsco Female Institute

In 1723, Maryland enacted a bill requiring a school in each county. Rev Joeseph Colebatch, Col Samuel Young, William Locke, Charles Hammond, Capt Daniel Maraitiee, Richard Warfield, and John Beale were commissioned to buy land and build schools in what was then Anne Arundel County. Ellicott City opened its first boys' school in the Weir building in 1820. In 1835, the state declared Ellicott's Mills a primary school district. In 1839, the Howard District of Anne Arundel County was formed.

Early schools were funded and managed independently through towns, investors, the state and churches. Some early examples were St. Charles College, incorporated in 1830 near Doughoregan Manor, Patapsco Female Institute (1833) in Ellicott City, and Mount St. Clement (1867) at Illchester. By 1847, the Howard District operated 20 single-room school houses.

By 1853, the law required each school to have three trustees and one clerk appointed in one year terms by vote. In 1864, Maryland created the state board of education for public education, leaving counties to control their own school boards. Teachers' pay was increased to $100 per quarter.

In 1885, former Maryland Governor John Lee Carroll joined the school board along with J. T. Williams and John W. Dorsey.

In 1894, Chairman Robert A. Dobbin and the remainder of the county school board were indicted for receiving money in excess of per diem.

In 1905, corporal punishment was tested in the courts after Highland School teacher Cora Burgess was fined for whipping a student, an act that would be banned by the state 88 years later.

=== 1920s ===
In 1922, the State of Maryland authorized $600,000 in bond sales for Howard County expenses. A cap of $60,000 was placed on school improvement expenses, and $540,000 was required to be allocated to road construction.

By the mid-1920s some children rode to school on private produce trucks. In 1928, the first county school bus service started.

During the period, 156 Rosenwald Schools were built in Maryland for teaching African-American children. In Howard County, the five-teacher school in Cooksville, the two-teacher Guilford school was constructed, and the one-room Elkridge school. Superintendent W.C. Phillips commissioned a more robust stone high school for Ellicott City with a cornerstone laid in November 1924.

=== Depression era ===
Former Justice of the Peace and Coroner Stanley E. Grantham served as board president until World War II.

In 1937, the school system dropped the practice of charging students for bus fare to its schools, as well as transporting parochial students. It also dedicated its first classroom in Savage for "backward" special needs students, and implemented its first modular classroom to hold students until repairs could be made to an unsafe school. Future commissioner and board member Charles E. Miller started his own bus service and vehicle sales to the county.

In 1938, many single-room school houses were sold to private bidders, and multiple elementary and high school projects were started, using 45% Federal Emergency Agency grants to reduce unemployment and set fair wages. In 1939, the county issued its first school bonds, borrowing $107,000 for construction of Ellicott City Elementary, Clarksville Middle, Clarksville High, and Highland Colored School. From this date to present, the county has maintained public debt interest expenses for school expansion. It also consolidated all insurance under one broker, W. Emil Thompson, a candidate for state senator.

=== WWII era ===
In 1941, hospital owner and land developer Issac Taylor became board president. As early as November 1940, the board expressed concerns about selective service pulling away most of the male teachers for military service.

African-American school teacher Effie Liggans Scott was released for working while pregnant.

When conscientious objector Richard McCleary refused to salute the flag in class, the board made a policy to dismiss the student from school.

By late 1944, school construction was at a standstill and there was a shortage of qualified teachers. The board focused on teacher bonuses and bus contracts.

=== After the war ===
At the war's end, Eleanor M. Cissel became the president of the board. Her family was active as school bus operators in the county, and Charlie Cissel taught at the Lisbon agriculture school.

The state board of education mandated classroom sizes be reduced to 35 from 40 and the addition of a 12th grade.

In 1946, future County Executive Omar Jones started as an Agriculture teacher.

In 1948, a single centralized county high school with busing was proposed, but the $1,000,000 cost was considered prohibitive.

The only major program funded in the decade since the PWA money grants was the agriculture shop at Lisbon, which ballooned from $8,000 to over $18,000 in construction costs by 1949.

=== 1950s ===
In 1949, John H. Brown became the board president. After 10 years without school construction, the county awaited legislation for bonds that could be paid off in the 20-year design life of the buildings, leaving the county without debt by 1969. A single central high school design was modified to one that would serve three districts, and plans for additions to Clarksville, Libson, and West Friendship were made at an estimated cost of $875,000.

1949 was also the first year that the school board met with representatives regarding the combined impact of schools with water, sewer, and roads. Four colored and one white schools without water were funded for new wells. School buses and drivers were inspected for the first time.

The board expanded to four members in May 1949 with the addition of Norman H. Warfield, and a new position of County Superintendent was created and given with Warfield's vote to John E. Yingling.

In 1949, future land developer and County Executive Norman E. Moxley was hired in a new position as chairman of the school building commission.

By 1952, the first major subdivisions were started in Ellicott City, prompting the League of Women Voters to express concern. The school board noted that there was plenty of land in the county for schools, just little funding for new buildings. The planning board provided the first listings of building permits to the school board showing growth rates nearly doubling in three months. School salaries were raised to a base of $3,000 a year, and the student-to-teacher ratio was lowered to 33.

In 1953, Maryland expanded the loans for new schools to $514,000, and driver's education classes began.

In 1955, Charles E. Miller was elected president of the board.

Maryland governor J. Millard Tawes appointed Gertrude Crist to the school board in 1959.

=== 1960s ===
In 1962, Senator Frank E. Shipley bypassed the state school board nominating commission recommendation of Fred Schoenbrodt, and installed Clifford Y. Stephens.

The school board proposed an ambitious $3 million expansion of Howard High, and administration buildings funded by a 6% increase in property taxes for anticipated growth.

In October 1963, Stephens was indicted for price fixing milk and died soon after in an automobile crash. His death reduced the school board to two people, and there was a lengthy board process to recommend a replacement candidate to the governor. Senator James A. Clark Jr. recommended a change. The school board expanded to five members in 1964, all chosen by the governor (J. Millard Tawes): James Moxley Jr, Fred Schoenbrodt, Gertrude Crist, Austin Zimmer, and Edward Cochran.

In 1965, the county implemented a .25% transfer tax to fund new schools and parks, netting $70,000 in its first nine months. The school board estimated 39,600 pupils by 1980, missing the mark by 15,000.

In May 1966, the Howard County Citizens Association confronted Howard Research and Development for using 700 acres of school property bought by the county at market rate to count as part of the 3200 acres of open space promised for the Columbia development plan. Rouse comprised slightly by not including school buildings as open space in calculations, and donating land for schools not already purchased with a "maintenance fee" for the transfer.

In 1966 the Elementary and Secondary Education Act was passed. Howard County shared $75,000 in title III planning grants with Caroll County, and $110,000 in Title I grants for 466 students who qualified for low income family education. Councilman Norman E. Moxley's Normandy Insurance was awarded an insurance contract for BOE vehicles. The Central Maryland News and Times requested that the county stop its closed door policy on school board meetings. Meetings remained closed, but controlled press releases were resumed. A foundation recommended the school system start using a centralized computer based education system, and another recommended outdoor classrooms.

In 1967 Howard County attempted to consolidate its offices in Ellicott City. The board of education declined, and offered to relocate to the recently vacated Harriet Tubman School Building. County commissioners approved the formation of a community college. In 1968, Thomas M Goedeke was selected from Baltimore County to become chief of public education, serving until 1984, replacing 42-year veteran John E. Yingling. Future county executive Edward L. Cochran became head of the school board.

=== Desegregation ===
In early America, Howard County did not provide any education to African-Americans. However, an 1872 Maryland state law required districts with at least 15 school-age colored children to operate a segregated school for those pupils. The next year, Howard County began a colored school, with four teachers lecturing in rented rooms, using secondhand schoolbooks from white schools.

Dedicated schools began with the building of the Ellicott City Colored School in 1888. In 1917, colored schools operated 7 months by state law. In 1936, Cooksville became the first school to offer an 8th grade curriculum. This was expanded to four years in 1939, but only offered at single school.

In 1938, African-American teachers petitioned for equal salaries, which would cost $7,500 ($171,543 in 2025) annually. Superintendent S. E. Grantham and the commissioners denied the petition, but in 1940, a federal court mandated equal salaries. In response, the board offered an extra month's pay if the teachers' union would not litigate against them for equal salaries.

In the urgency following the Pearl Harbor attack, teachers from all races trained together in first aid for the first time. That racial equity was less apparent when the board announced in September 1942 that students seeking clinic aid for syphilis could only use colored buses, because using a white bus was considered improper.

By 1949, the Cooksville School had 79 students for one teacher. In 1952 Howard County operated 8 elementary, two junior high, and three high schools for 3,790 white students. There were nine "colored" elementary schools and one high school for 976 students. The school board recognized overcrowding, and noted that colored students would soon be requesting modern indoor bathrooms like other schools in the county.

In 1954, the US Supreme Court declared segregation illegal in Brown v. Board of Education. The school board, which included future county commissioner Charles E. Miller, delayed action, and the NAACP wrote the board asking why they were not following the Supreme Court decision. In November 1955, a citizens' committee on desegregation was formed and asked to report its findings in 1956 for the 1956–1957 school year. County PTA organizations disagreed with the county's plans to continue segregated bus service to future integrated schools.

In July 1957, the Maryland Court of appeals threw out a residential legal effort to block the Supreme Court's authority on county integration plans. On July 13, 1963, the board of education put together a plan to desegregate schools, which was put into effect in November 1963 with a plan to continue partial segregation until 1967. The chairman of the NAACP education committee Robert H. Kittleman, threatened demonstrations if the school board would continue segregation past 1964.

The county's official plan to eliminate segregation was approved by Francis Keppel, the United States Commissioner of Education, in July 1965. Days later, desegregation requirements passed the US Congress in the Housing and Urban Development Act of 1965; it would help finance the new town of Columbia. Howard County eliminated one class of segregated students per year, taking 11 years to implement integrated classes.

=== 1970s ===
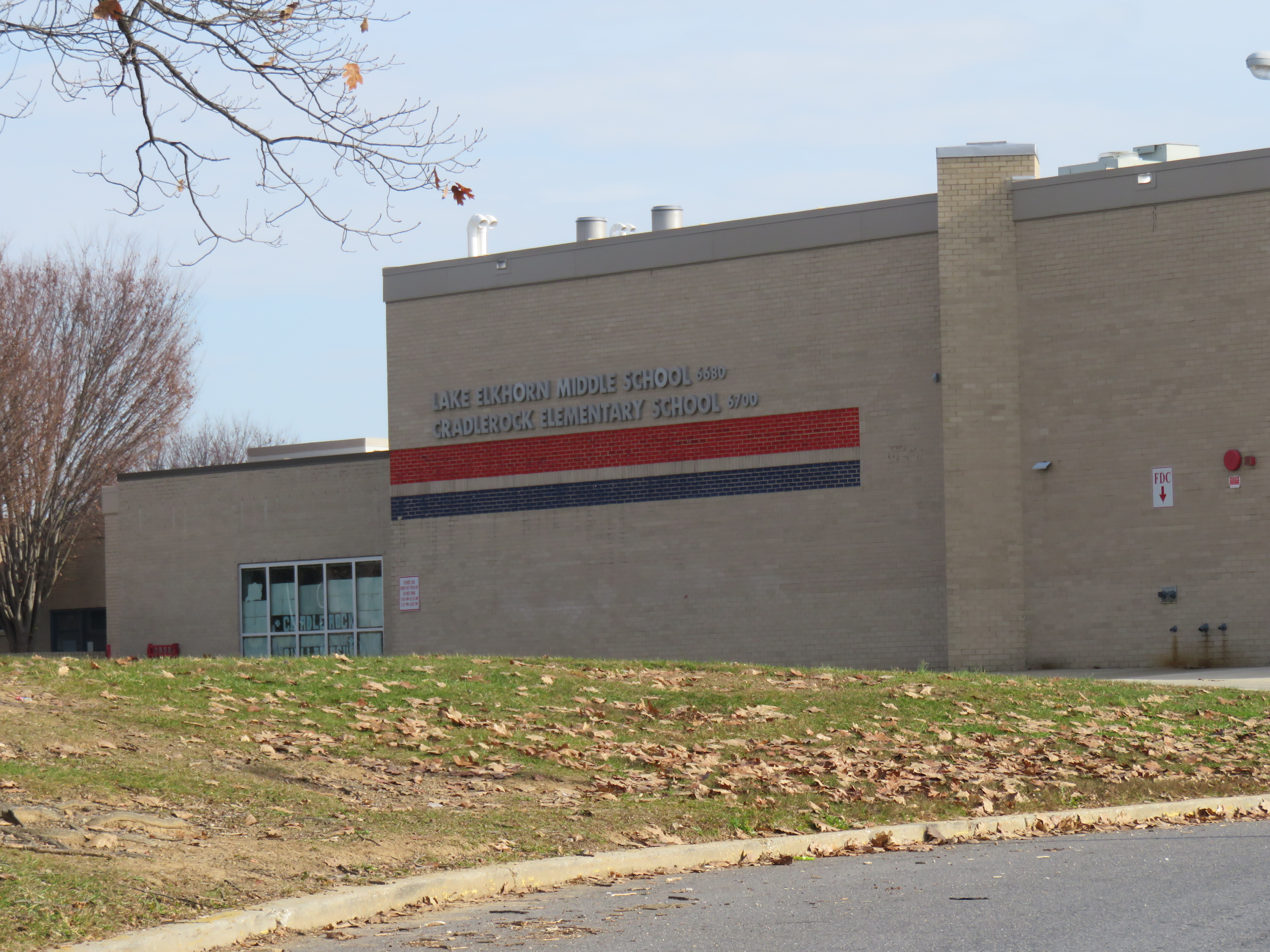
Lake Elkhorn Middle School – Cradlerock Elementary School (once Dasher Green Elementary – Owen Brown Middle)

With the development of Columbia, the school system shifted its emphasis on neighborhood schools. The school board faced complaints of children from new developments in Columbia being districted in outlying underutilized schools because the developer promised a "Columbia School System" in its sales marketing. In 1972, the Office of Civil Rights questioned the lack of African-Americans in administrative positions. Goedeke, chief of public education, responded by saying there was a lack of qualified applicants, and that African-American teachers who ran colored schools prior to integration were "teacher-principals" or "teachers-in-charge" who were not qualified as administrators under present-day considerations.

In 1974, school budgets produced a surplus of $200,000 from bond investments that were returned to the general funds.

Future County Executive Charles I. Ecker was brought on as superintendent for Howard County schools, serving until 1989.

In 1976, arbiter Robert I. Bloch ruled that the school selection board had improperly used race and non-professional factors in the review of Charles Griffin for pupil personnel supervisor.

The county opened the first conjoined elementary school and middle school with Dasher Green Elementary and Owen Brown Middle. Wilde Lake High School was the first high school in Columbia to open (1971), and Wilde Lake Middle School was the first middle school to open (1969).

=== 1980s ===
Prior membership in the school board was by selection. In 1982, William Manning became the first African-American elected to the 118-year-old school board.

In 1984, each school was supplied with 23–45 Apple IIe computers, starting the first education efforts in programming.

=== 1990s ===
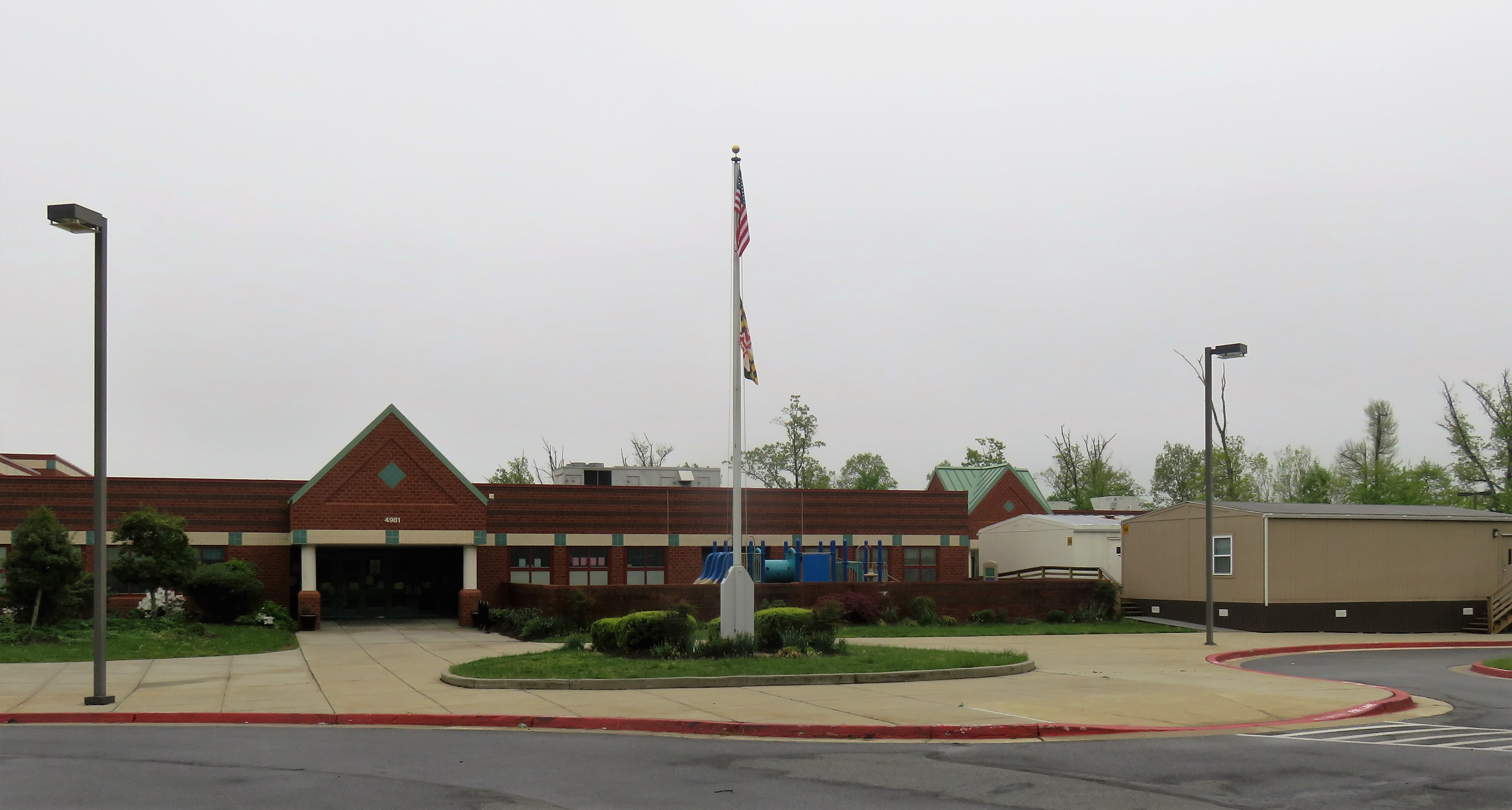
Ilchester Elementary School, opened 1996

In 1992, Superintendent Michael E. Hickey proposed a $250 million plan to expand the school system by 15 schools. By 1993, the school board voted to delay school construction and look at construction cost savings.

=== 2000s ===
In 2006, Howard County set a health policy.

=== 2010s ===
In 2014, the school computer systems were targeted by a cyber attack.

In late 2014, the board approved early retirement options for teachers with over 15 years of tenure, with a projection of 594 employees leaving the system. In 2015, the superintendent suspended citizen review of the yearly budget, relying on the zero-based budgeting process.

In 2017, the construction of the newly rebuilt Wilde Lake Middle School was finished. It was the first net zero energy school in Maryland, and the biggest in the United States. It features multiple solar panels and a geothermal field.

=== Residential subdivision ===
In 1964, the developers of Columbia, Maryland envisioned an independent year-round school system for its residents. A portion of the land bought by Rouse Corporation was provided at no cost to the school system, to build schools to accommodate the impact from the development. Howard County remained in control of the school system.

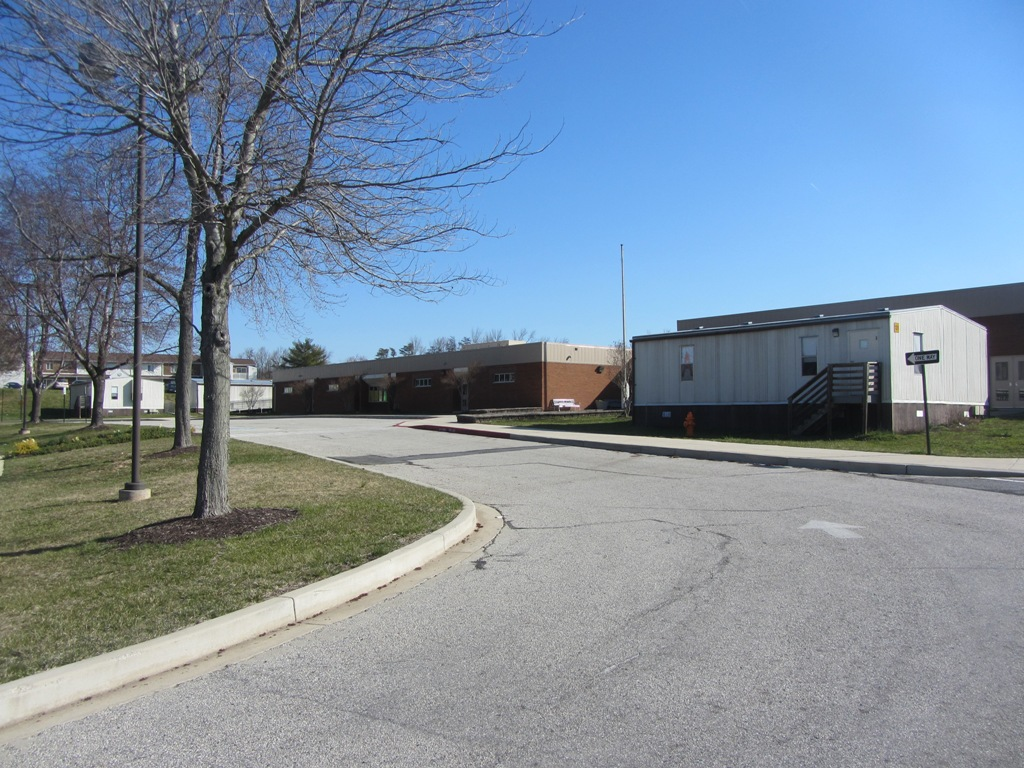
Laurel Woods Elementary surrounded with portable classrooms

As Columbia reached its maximum planned capacity, developers turned to the eastern portion of Howard County served by public water and sewer for infill development opportunities. The Howard County School system increased substantially in size, but development in the county outpaced the number of seats available for students. In 2006, an adequate public facilities ordinance (APFO) was enacted. It temporarily limited development in elementary school districts only which were over 120% capacity. It still allowed developers the ability to proceed with projects three years after submittal regardless of overcrowding. To keep up with demand, the school system developed a method of regular redistricting, moving students to western schools with more capacity. The school system revived the concept of portable trailers in the early 1990s, increasing to 50 units in 1995, 217 by 2013, and 238 in 2014.

Year	High schools	Junior high schools	Elementary schools	Total schools	Students	Budget	$ per student (adjusted to 2013)
1847			20 (single-room)	20		$3900 ($111,423 Inflation adjusted to 2013)	
1877						$1,989.48 (segregated), $488.67 (colored)	
1900	Combined	Combined	70 (grades 1–11 single-room)	55 (segregated), 15 (colored)	3,019	$41,666.49 ($979,680.19 Inflation adjusted to 2013)	$324
1929	Combined	Combined				$123,932	
1936	Combined	Combined				$161,631	
1941	3 (segregated), 1 (colored)	No jr. high			3,469	$290,000	
1947	3 (segregated), 1 (colored)	No jr. high	6 (segregated), 8 (colored)	18	3,619	$520,000	
1952	3 (segregated), 1 (colored)	2 (segregated)	8 (segregated), 9 (colored)	23	4,776	$1,043,107.00 ($9,162,533.80 inflation adjusted to 2013)	
1968	3			20	13,000		
1975	6	7			23,992		
1978	8	11	26	45 +1 VoTech +1 special needs	25,606	$46,100,000	
1980	8	10			25,228		
1985	8	10			24,978		
1990	8	10	26		30,002	$155,000,000 (operating)	$9,520.07
1995	8	15			37,323		
2000	10	18			44,525		
2005	12	19			47,795		
2010	12	19			49,991		
2011	12	19			50,489		$13,708
2013	12	19	40	71 + 3 special needs	51,681	$703,667,400 (operating), $77,490,000 (capital)	$15,263
2014	12	20	41	73 + 3 special needs	52,799	$725,300,000 (operating)	$14,108
2017					67,639 (est)		
2021	12	20	41	73 + 3 special needs	57,325		

== High schools ==
The county operates 13 high schools.

Name	Enrollment	Principal	History	Modular classrooms
Atholton High School	1498	Shawn Hastings-Hauf	Est. 1966	
Centennial High School	1364	Joelle Miller	Est. 1977	9
Glenelg High School	1367	Nick Novak	Est. 1958	
Guilford Park High School	750	Josh Wasilewski	Est. 2023	
Hammond High School	1167	Raymona Reid	Est. 1976	4
Homewood Center	110	Christopher Rattay	Est. 2001	
Howard High School	1529	Allen Cosentino	Est. 1950	15
Long Reach High School	1448	Lynnette Moore	Est. 1996	4
Marriotts Ridge High School	1701	Nicole Dennis	Est. 2005	
Mt. Hebron High School	1518	Kathleen Clark	Est. 1965	4
Oakland Mills High School	1422	Dwayne Williams	Est. 1973	
Reservoir High School	1729	Karim Shortridge	Est. 2002	5
River Hill High School	1462	John Difato	Est. 1996	
Wilde Lake High School	1270	Michael Brown	Est. 1971, open-layout school rebuilt in 1996	

High school Advanced Placement scores 2015

High school	High school enrollment	AP exams	AP exams 3+	AP exams 3+ %
Atholton	1460	711	603	84.8%
Centennial	1402	1453	1231	84.7%
Glenelg	1261	939	759	80.8%
Hammond	1226	490	353	72.0%
Homewood	146	—	—	—
Howard	1758	1164	828	71.1%
Long Reach	1434	468	333	71.2%
Marriots Ridge	1161	1024	888	86.7%
Mount Hebron	1498	864	776	89.8%
Oakland Mills	1085	521	326	73.5%
Reservoir	1482	743	544	73.2%
River Hill	1310	1335	1125	84.3%
Wilde Lake	1234	477	391	82.0%

== Middle schools ==
The county operates 20 middle schools.

Name	Enrollment	Principal	History	Modular classrooms
Bonnie Branch Middle School	705	Lisa Smithson	1999	2
Burleigh Manor Middle School	785	Dr. Alexis Couch	1992 – Named after the Burleigh Manor slave plantation home	1
Clarksville Middle School	729	Kim Scaife	1979	5
Dunloggin Middle School	544	Antoinette Roberson	1973	5
Elkridge Landing Middle School	691	James McVey IV	1995	2
Ellicott Mills Middle School	808	Peter Gaylord	1939 – Former Ellicott City High School	3
Folly Quarter Middle School	664	Michael Babe	2003 – Named after the Folly Quarter slave plantation home	
Glenwood Middle School	490	Melissa Shindel	1967	6
Hammond Middle School	583	Lisa Smith	1971	3
Harper's Choice Middle School	505	Tiffanie Nunley	1973	5
Lake Elkhorn Middle School	640	Brian Wallace	1976 as Owen Brown middle, operated as the K–8 "Cradlerock School" from 2003 to 2009, then renamed to Lake Elkhorn in 2011	1
Lime Kiln Middle School	619	Andrew Cockley	1999	
Mayfield Woods Middle School	758	David Strothers	1991	2
Mount View Middle School	721	Jennifer Patterson	1993	2
Murray Hill Middle School	636	Tammy Jones	1997	6
Oakland Mills Middle School	476	Regina McLendon	1972	
Patapsco Middle School	663	Kelly Hearns	1969	4
Patuxent Valley Middle School	800	Richard Smart	1989 – $21.7 million in security modifications and expansion approved in 2014	
Thomas Viaduct Middle School	857	Denise Young	2014 – Built as part of the Oxford Square development, named after the Thomas Viaduct rail bridge (1833) built on the site of the Hockley Forge and Mill (1760)	4
Wilde Lake Middle School	626	Rushmi Bury	1969 – Net zero school rebuilt in 2017. Named after the Wilde Lake neighborhood, which in turn was named for Frazier B. Wilde (president of a company that invested in the development of Columbia).	0

== Elementary schools ==
The county operates 42 elementary schools.

Name	Enrollment	Principal	History	Modular classrooms	City	Has preK?	GreatSchool rating (as of September 20, 2020)
Atholton Elementary School	387	Robin Malcotti	Opened 1961, named after the nearby early 1700s Athol manor house of Rev. James MacGill	3	Columbia		7/10
Bellows Spring Elementary School	762	Julie Schruefer	Opened 2003, named after the Thomas Christian farm "Bellow's Spring"	5	Ellicott City		8/10
Bollman Bridge Elementary School	663	Connie Fowlkes	Opened 1988, named after the nearby Savage Bollman Truss Railroad Bridge	2	Savage		3/10
Bryant Woods Elementary School	335	Danielle Shanks-Forney	Opened 1968	4	Columbia		5/10
Bushy Park Elementary School	788	Kristian Rutledge	Opened 1976, named after Dr. Charles Alexander Warfield's 1771 slave plantation "Bushy Park"	0	Glenwood		9/10
Centennial Lane Elementary School	628	Tracey Albright	Opened 1973	5	Ellicott City	Yes	9/10
Clarksville Elementary School	634	Michael Caldwell	Opened 1964	1	Clarksville	No	9/10
Clemens Crossing Elementary School	522	Michelle Leader	Opened 1979	3	Columbia	No	8/10
Cradlerock Elementary School	487	Aricka Porter	Opened 1976 as Dasher Green Elementary. Operated as "The Cradlerock School" from 2003 to 2009, renamed to Cradlerock Elementary in 2011.	3	Columbia		3/10
Dayton Oaks Elementary School	788	Adrienne Williams-McKinney	Opened 2006	0	Dayton		9/10
Deep Run Elementary School	601	Nigel LaRoche	Opened 1990, named after the Deep Run branch of the Patapsco River	5	Elkridge		5/10
Ducketts Lane Elementary School	662	Molly Caroland	Opened 2013	0	Elkridge		5/10
Elkridge Elementary School	779	Kelley Powell	Opened 1992	4	Elkridge		6/10
Forest Ridge Elementary School	626	Trish Lannon	Opened 1992	5	Laurel		6/10
Fulton Elementary School	772	Tanisha Burks	Opened 1997	0	Fulton		8/10
Gorman Crossing Elementary School	540	Deborah Holmes	Opened 1998, named after Senator Arthur Pue Gorman	2	Laurel		7/10
Guilford Elementary School	462	Stephanie Barber-Wehrman	Opened 1954	5	Columbia		5/10
Hammond Elementary School	597	Heather Moraff	Opened 1971	1	Laurel		7/10
Hanover Hills Elementary School		Troy Todd	Opened 2018		Hanover		
Hollifield Station Elementary School	710	Amanda Wadsworth	Opened 1997	6	Ellicott City		5/10
Ilchester Elementary School	668	Lauren Beaman	Opened 1996	2	Ellicott City		9/10
Jeffers Hill Elementary School	421	Maisha Strong	Opened 1974	2	Columbia	No	7/10
Laurel Woods Elementary School	540	Connie Stahler	Opened 1973 as Whiskey Bottom Road Elementary	2	Laurel		6/10
Lisbon Elementary School	553	Debra Anoff	Opened 1976	1	Woodbine		9/10
Longfellow Elementary School	418	Vanya Jackson	Opened 1970	8	Columbia		5/10
Manor Woods Elementary School	647	Kelli Jenkins	Opened 1994	1	Ellicott City	No	8/10
Northfield Elementary School	672	Cathleen Lopez	Opened 1968	1	Ellicott City	No	7/10
Phelps Luck Elementary School	540	Ed Cosentino	Opened 1972	7	Columbia		5/10
Pointers Run Elementary School	776	Shawna Holden	Opened 1991	9	Clarksville		9/10
Rockburn Elementary School	667	Elizabeth Yankle	Opened 1993	1	Elkridge		7/10
Running Brook Elementary School	405	Gillian Spivey	Opened 1970	3	Columbia		5/10
St. John's Lane Elementary School	597	Daniel Notari	Opened 1954 – built by Windsor Construction for $235,985	6	Ellicott City	No	7/10
Stevens Forest Elementary School	333	Katie Carter	Opened 1972	5	Columbia		4/10
Swansfield Elementary School	528	Anthony Esposito	Opened 1972	4	Columbia		3/10
Talbott Springs Elementary School	443	Leslie Harmon	Opened 1973	7	Columbia		6/10
Thunder Hill Elementary School	368	Sonia Hurd	Opened 1970	1	Columbia	No	7/10
Triadelphia Ridge Elementary School	544	Tiffany Tresler	Opened 1998	0	Ellicott City	No	10/10
Veterans Elementary School	788	Alexcia Redd	Opened 2007	7	Ellicott City		6/10
Waterloo Elementary School	594	Sean Martin	Opened 1964	4	Columbia		8/10
Waverly Elementary School	675	Rachel Edoho-Eket	Opened 1990. Named after the George Howard slave plantation, Waverley.	3	Ellicott City		9/10
West Friendship Elementary School	396	Debra O'Bryne	Opened 1925 as the West Friendship Consolidated High School	0	West Friendship		9/10
Worthington Elementary School	516	Robert Bruce	Opened 1976 next to the New Cut landfill.	1	Ellicott City		9/10

== Former Howard County schools ==
- Alberton – Closed in 1939, with children consolidated to Ellicott City
- Alpha Colored School – Discontinued in 1938 with establishment of first bus service. Students sent to Cooksville Colored School.
- Annapolis Junction Colored School – In use in 1886
- Annapolis Rock School – One-room schoolhouse built in 1894 near modern Woodbine and 94. The 38-by-24-foot schoolhouse was rebuilt in 1908 by Lucy Driver Hilton in one month for $600. Children would be paid 50 cents a month to tend the pot bellied stove. Closed in 1943. Sold to Jessie M. Sirk for $400 and converted to a private residence.
- Atholton Colored School – A one-room school house next to Locust Church. The $50 structure was approved by the board on April 3, 1883, on land given by John R. and Susie Clark in 1885. Ordered closed in 1900 to Flu epidemic. Students transferred to Guilford in 1939. School property bought for $200 by Locust Church. In 1941, an additional unaccounted acre was sold on a separate bid for $701 to Herbert M Brown. Schoolhouse placed on new foundation at 10550 Shaker Drive
- Atholton High School – In 1948, a new 10-room high school was called Atholton Colored School was ordered. It was designed by Francis Thuman to be built in Simpsonville with a $280,000 budget. The cornerstone was set on September 25, 1948, by the Colored Masonic Lodge. Clarksville students were used to operate the bulldozers used in grading. Renamed at the request of students to Harriet Tubman High School in 1949. By 1953, the library, cafeteria, and supervisor's office were all used as classrooms; a four-room addition was recommended to relieve overcrowding. The last class of 42 students graduated in June 1965.
- Bethany School –Built on site of a log schoolhouse named Dorsey Academy. A new school was built on land given by C.W. and Emily Peddicord in 1898 and was closed in 1940, sold for $1082 to the Bethany Married Circle Church who surrendered their bid to William A Wheatley.
- Clarksville Elementary and Middle – A wood-and-stucco school opened in 1920 with $5,000 in funds. It was later used by the roads department and stood at a location where the parking lot of the "Ten Oaks Ballroom" resides now. A new building was started in 1938 and a new site was selected because of "water runoff." The 4.5 acres of land bought from Katherine Dorsey and J Nicols. Miller was purchased from the school board for $2,800. New construction was started on 6 acres bought from John Easter for $1,800. An outside shop was built in 1943. The school was converted to the Gateway private school cited by the EPA for uncontrolled air emissions in 1999. In 2012 County Executive Ken Ulman demolished the school, and sold the property with upzoning to land developer GreenStone Ventures II LLC for $5 million.
- Colesville Colored School – A Rosenwald School located along the east side of Stevens Road. Water came from a bucket in a neighboring property's well as late as 1949. Consolidated to Guilford in 1954. Sold to Clifford Y. Stephens for $2,776 and converted to a private residence which was destroyed in 2006 to develop "Hammonds Overlook Townhomes".
- Cooksville School – Twenty-year-old future governor Edwin Warfield taught classes in 1868.
- Cooksville Colored School (Colored School #1 4th district) – Thomas H. Hood and his wife, Sarah donated land for the school in 1867. A two-room house served as the school and for church services until burned in 1922. A new one-room school was built to replace it. A new Rosenwald School was built on the site between 1925 and 1926 by Crook and Coates bidding $5,865, but later raised to $7,100. In 1935, Cooksville became the first and only county African-American high school, by offering classes up to grade 11. outfitted with a portable classroom from Savage in 1939. A second portable in poor condition was planned to be towed to the site, but a new one was built in 1942 using National Defense Training money. In 1943, the board allowed teachers to rent the top floor for apartments, and rented additional classroom space in the private house of Alonzo Lee. In 1949 one of the portable was moved to Atholton (Harriet Tubman) for Agriculture training. In 1956, the board delayed implementation of desegregation, but approved installation of indoor heating and toilets. The school closed in 1968, and was used by the roads department for stockpiling until 1978, when Executive Edward L. Cochran deeded the land back to the Mt. Gregory Methodist Church.
- Cradlerock School (2003–2009) – A combined K–8 school merged from Dasher Green Elementary and Owen Brown Middle. Reverted to Cradlerock Elementary and Lake Elkhorn Middle in 2011.
- Crapster School – One-room schoolhouse near Florence, Maryland, on Crapster farm
- Daisy Colored School (School House #5) – 2 acres purchased in 1876 by Dennis and Leama Gaither. A log cabin was built in 1890 for the schoolhouse and was replaced in 1905 by the Daisy United Methodist Church with school services in the basement. School functions ceased in 1946. The school was dismantled in 2009 and is awaiting reconstruction on museum property in West Friendship. The outpost remained on the list in 2014.
- Dasher Green – Built in 1976, renamed to Cradlerock Elementary
- Dayton Colored School – Built in 1878 at Brown's Chapel on Howard Road. Once ordered closed in 1887 after firing of the teacher. Renovated in 1899. Water provided by a bucket in a neighbors well as late as 1949. In 1952, Robert Louis Gaither appealed to the school board to rebuild the school after a fire. The school board chose to move children to Highland colored school. The school land was sold to Robert S. Gaither for $750, with Melville Scott & Sons reimbursing the board $2,700 for fire damages.
- Dayton White School – Schoolhouse No. 19 – Built prior to 1860 South of Dayton along modern Green Bridge road. Sold in 1964 for $9,267 to Daniel L Harp Jr.
- Doughoregan Manor Colored School #4 District 5 – In operation in 1899, ordered closed in 1900 due to low attendance
- Elioak School – Situated on the second floor of the Elioak post office built in 1893. A replacement school was built on land granted by the Gardner family in 1916 on the corner of Clarkland farms. Converted to a storage building in 1941 and sold back to the Gardner Family for $300.
- Elkridge Colored School (upper) – closed in 1931
- Elkridge Colored School (lower) – A one-teacher Rosenwald School built between 1925 and 1926 for $2,450. It was heated with pot belly stoves. In 1952, the colored PTA asked for safer heating and after inspection from the fire marshal, E. Reid Bossom, the pot belly stoves were declared safe. School consolidated to Guilford in 1954 and sold to Elkridge Community for $1000.
- Elkridge High School – 45% funded with a 1935 Federal Emergency Agency grant requiring wages of up to eighty cents an hour for skilled labor. The building was designed by Clyde M. Fritz, architect of Baltimore's Enoch Pratt Free Library. The school was converted to Elkridge Elementary in 1952 as part of a consolidation effort, and replaced in 1992. The school was then planned to be raised sold to developers for a 46-unit housing project. The school was sold for $500,000 to the privately run Norbel school and is vacant by 2013. By 2011, Elkridge Elementary district was overcrowded, prompting another search for land for an additional Elementary school.
- Ellicott City Colored School (1880–1953) 8683 Frederick Road. The first African-American schoolhouse in the county. Repurchased by Howard County in 1995 for $80,000 and restored as a museum.
- Ellicott City Colored School – Combined four-room elementary and seven-room high school proposed in 1944. Water secured from a spring next to Stewart's Store. School property bought on Fels Lane in 1952. Bids were resubmitted after the first round submission date was changed without notice to select bidders. The school was funded with a $55,000 loan, costing the county less than one-third of the cost of a single addition on the Lisbon school. The school project was renamed Fels Lane Elementary in 1953. Later the school was converted to a police station. The school was converted into the Roger Carter Recreation Center in 1976 as part of the County's Hilltop subsidized housing project. (Roger Carter was the first African-American school bus owner-operator in the county starting in 1953). The building was demolished in 2011 and rebuilt as a $15 million recreation center to support a renamed subsidized housing project with an additional 204 units on the former school property.
- Ellicott City School (1820) – Boys-only school in the Weir House on Court Ave. Moved in 1824.
- Ellicott City School (1824) – Coed school on Strawberry Lane which operated until moved. Building demolished in 1919.
- Ellicott City School (1884) – Petitioned by Reuben D Johnson. Built on land bought from John G. and Rebecca Rodgers in 1888, on School Street. Sold in 1939 to newspaper owner P.G. Stromberg for $500.
- Ellicott City Elementary School – Started in 1938 on 6 acres bought from J William Martin for $4,000. A road to the school was built in 1949. By 1953, the library was converted to classrooms, a portable classroom was added, the science room and locker rooms were all converted to classrooms. County Executive J. Hugh Nichols attempted to re-purpose the building in 1981, but later sold it at auction. The property was converted to the Greystone Development housing and apartments on the 4.2-acre site. Developers Michael A Nibali, Emmett Peake, Potapsco Valley Associates, and the Brightwater Group were all owners that were foreclosed on during the project.
- Ellicott City High School (1924) – a stone-construction four-story-high all-grade school built with the remains of Rock Hill College (1865). Converted to an elementary in 1938, closed in 1976.
- Ellicott City High School (1938) – The board accepted an 8-acre donation on Montgomery Road in 1938 from partner's Benjamin Mellor, and Charles E. Miller on the condition that the board pay their renter Mr. Hardman for lost crops. Hardman approached the board and demanded $600, a high price in January at the end of the depression. The board eventually paid $400, and request $2,500 from the public works administration to cover the costs for the crops and donated land. Hardman attempted to harvest the crops in June 1939 and was fined, Hardman later became a wartime School Bus contractor for the county. The school was built by the Charles C Sanford Company, and finished in 1939. Benjaman Mellor would partner with Emil Thompson in the firm of Hermann and Carr, selling insurance for all school buildings in the county. The school was the site of the Howard County fair in 1947, which moved to Freestate Raceway in 1948 and returned for the 1951 and 1952 years. In 1952, future county executive Omar J. Jones becomes the principal. Converted to a middle school, and demolished in 1999 to build Ellicott's Mill's Middle School.
- Faulkner Ridge Elementary – School built for $1,010,000 in 1967. Closed in 1983 with a refusal to hear appeal by J. Thomas Nissel. Used as HPSS office space.
- Florence School – Built on land purchased by Joshua D. Warfield and Ligon families in 1872 and later owned by the Black family. Closed in 1943 after the death of J. Hubert Black's father. Future board member A Robey Mullinix outbid by Fred Duval for $650. Property forfeited to Raymond Duval after purchase. The remainder of the 253 surrounding acres became Larriland Farms when County commissioner J. Hubert Black swapped his family property for undeveloped Columbia farmland in 1963.
- Folly Quarter School and Folly Quarter Colored School – Converted from white school to colored school at Folly Quarter in December 1877.
- Fulton School – Pindell School (Schoolhouse No. 22) – Land acquired in 1862. Along Pindell School Road and modern route 216. In July 1866, Methodist Episcopal Church South congregation established at schoolhouse. Closed in 1939 and consolidated to Scaggsville. C.M Ridgley bought the property for $750. Schoolhouse No.3 was built prior to 1878 on the land of Richard Pindell II, a teacher at the school, which operated until 1939
- Glenelg School – The yellow one-room schoolhouse was built on Sharpe lane next to the Providence Methodist Church. Closed in 1942, students sent to Clarksville and Dayton.
- Glenwood-Hoods Mill – One-room classroom near Cooksville-Olney Road closed 1939 with students consolidated to Libson. Extra language added to sale to prevent building from selling liquor. School sold for $400 to E.H Pierson.
- Gorman (School house No.4) – Founded in 1832 as School District No. 26 of Anne Arundel County. It was located on Gorman Road near the present Wincopia Farms Road. Original trustees were Thomas Griffith, John Warfield of Joshua, and Jeremiah Berry. It closed in 1939 and consolidated to Scaggsville. Mrs Grace Gorman Johnson, Daughter of Senator Arthur Pue Gorman, bought the property adjoining the family estate "Overlook" for $225 without a bid.
- Guilford School – Built in 1876 along Guilford and Oakland Mills Road. Used until 1941, converted to a private residence and torn down.
- Guilford Colored School – "Robert Guilford Elementary" (1876–1941) Land given by Williams, Clark and Rodgers in 1876 near Guilford and Mission roads. A two teacher Rosenwald School was built and sold in 1941 to Henry J.W. Sealing for $1,151.
- Guilford Colored School (1952) – An 11-room school proposed in 1952 to be built on Mission road. Colored PTA were told to hold off on roof leak repairs to their schools for 18 months until funding arrived for the new replacement school. The landscaping budget for Howard High that year exceeded $1,000. In 1953, the board requested a $225,000 loan from the state for the school and found the building site was to steep for the project. In 1954 the old school was sold for $5,500 to William Blackwell and Edgar Barksdale but the county was fined for violating the title stipulated the property was to be returned to its original owners if not used for a school. A new school was built and later remodeled in 1982.
- Highland Colored Elementary – Requested in 1922 with a promise to move a portable classroom from Ellicott City. Community bought land in 1926 for school to move project forward. cancelled in 1938 to reallocate funds to Ellicott City schools. An additional $500 given to the architect for non-completion. No further federal grants were applied for. In May 1939, a delegation approached the board asking for the completion date of the colored school, and was told they had to wait until funds were available. A 66 student-to-teacher ratio was solved later that year by splitting the classroom in half with a partition. Construction started in 1952 following a fire that closed the Dayton school.
- Harriet Tubman School (see Atholton)
- Highridge School (Welsh's Schoolhouse) – One-room schoolhouse built on donated land from the Lemmuel Welsh family in 1890. Also held congregation of Emmanuel Methodist Church. Closed in 1939 with students going to Scaggsville. Welsh family attempted to buy property back for $500, but county went to open bids. Charles M. Ridgley bought the property for $1210 and the school was converted to a private residence which still is in use.
- Hopkins Chapel Colored School – School ordered to be built December 5, 1883, in the fifth district near Clarksville
- Ivory School – Single-room schoolhouse built before 1900
- Jonestown Colored School – In operation in 1889 near modern "Long Reach". The one-room school consolidated to Dorsey Colored in 1939.
- Laurel Colored School – repaired in 1886 by C.F. Shaffer
- Lisbon – First two-room schoolhouse built in 1899 on the site of the Union Church for Public Worship and gravesite.
- Lisbon High School – An 11-room high school is built in 1920 and replaced in 1935 with a 20-room high school. In 1939 the old and new schools are merged with a gym addition. Portable classrooms turned into library and agriculture classroom 1942. By 1948, the county had not built any substantial projects since PWA money grants of 1939. The exception was the Lisbon shop, budgeted for $8,000 in 1945, and built for nearly $18,000 in 1948 with cutbacks in design. In 1949, Harvey Hill, Richard Arrington and Thurman Warfield petitioned for land annexation for a playground. In 1952 The school was annexed again for $160,000 and closed in 1958.
- Long Corner School – In the community of Long Corner, one of the last single-room schools still in operation in 1949
- Meadowridge Colored school. Single-room school. By 1949, enrollment was 79 students with one teacher. School consolidated to Guilford in 1954 and sold to David J. Sparrow for $3,200.
- Marriotsville School – Schoolhouse No. 10 – Built prior to 1860 near Old Frederick and modern Sand Hill road. Land granted by William Davis in 1874, and built by the Marriotsville garage with the top floor used by a church. The one-room school closed 1939 and was sold to Peter Zepp for $300.
- Mount Gregory Colored School #1 District 4 – In operation in 1899
- Mount Pleasant School – Log schoolhouse built in 1859 in Glenelg. Tridelphia Ridge Elementary built over the site in 1998.
- Mount View Colored School – Shut down as first bus service established. Sold in November 1939 to William J McDonald for $500. In December, the Seymor Ruff bid for the Scaggsville school came in $800 over the maximum bid. The board announced they would use $800 from the sale of Mt. View to cover the difference.
- New Point Colored School #2 – October 1889. Operated from a church in 1st district
- Orange Grove – Built 1898 in a combination church-schoolhouse. The Orange Grove mill burned in 1905, and the city was abandoned soon after.
- Oakland Mills Elementary – Built prior to 1860, One room in the Oakland Mills village along Old Columbia road, next to the Oakland Mills Blacksmith House and Shop. Attended by senator James A. Clark Jr.'s father.
- Owen Brown Middle School – Opened in 1976, renamed to Lake Elkhorn Middle in 2011
- Pfeiffer's Corner Schoolhouse – Classes first held in Miller's Barn. School built in 1883, and sold in 1938 to George Wehland for $575 as a private residence. Wehland had title difficulties because the school board was selling land bought in 1865, and there was no school board at that date. The school building sold again in 1940 to Vernon Titsworth for $500, and was moved again to parkland as an exhibit in 1988, with original land developed into housing.
- Pine Orchard Colored School – ordered the church operated school closed in July 1889.
- Popular Springs – Land donated by David Burdette in 1866. Closed 1939 with children going to Libson. Sold in a no-bid transaction to George D. Fleming for $315.
- Popular Springs Colored School – Recommended to be closed due to repair costs in August 1886
- Rockland School – single-room school off Old Frederick Road given by George and Martha Voltz in 1889 sold fall of 1939 for $1025 to John F. Baer initially, then Henry and Mabel Weingand. Students consolidated to Ellicott City.
- Rockland Elementary – $500,000 school built in 1962 on High Ridge Road in Commissioner Moxley's development of Normandy designed by Johannes & Murray. Closed in 1982. Housed the Rockland Arts Center from 1984 to 1989, sold to the county in 1989. Owned by Howard County Center for Arts.
- Rover School – Built on land donated by Evan W. and Sallie Ann Warfield in 1872. Closed in 1934, the board elected to sell the property to a Mr. George Amoss for $100, rather than return to the Warfield family.
- Scaggsville single-room schoolhouse built on land donated by Issac Scaggs family, closed in 1939. Public Works Building sold and moved for $5.00. Land sold to Daniel M. Murray Jr for $550.
- Scaggsville Elementary School – 45% funded with a FEA grant in 1938. Clyde M Fritz was selected as the architect and Julius A Kinlein as builder. Built on 5 acres of the Brown farm bought for $2000 in 1939. The board sued for a late completion of the school that jeopardized grant money in May 1939. The board withheld $3,090 from the builder, but did not return any percentage to the FEA.
- Savage School (1921) – Built on a landfill next to the Carroll Baldwin Hall, closed in 1937 due to cracking from land settling
- Savage Elementary (1938) – The school traded land on Route One, buying a new lot for $3000, closing the structurally failing two story brick schoolhouse and selling its old land for $300 to the Savage Manufacturing Company. The company mistakenly claimed there was sewer service onsite, leaving the county to also run new lines through savage to supply the new school site. By 1953, the school reached 335 students for the nine classrooms, and student were sent to Scaggsville and an extra classroom was planned on a second story.
- Schoolhouse No. 1 – Built prior to 1853
- Schoolhouse No. 2 – Built prior to 1853, along modern Mission Road
- Schoolhouse No. 3 – Built prior to 1853, in Lisbon District. Richard Hutchins Esq. trustee.
- Schoolhouse No. 4 (see Cooksville)
- Schoolhouse No. 5 (see Oakland Mills)
- Schoolhouse No. 6 – Built prior to 1860 along Bonnie Branch and modern Hurst road.
- Schoolhouse No. 7 – Built prior to 1860 on Hill Street in Ellicott City.
- Schoolhouse No. 8 – Built prior to 1895 near Route 32
- Schoolhouse No. 10 (see Orange Grove)
- Schoolhouse No. 15 – Colored school built prior to 1860 near Long Corner Road and Schafferville Road
- Schoolhouse No. 16 – Built prior to 1860 near modern Roxbury Mills (Westminster) Road and Roxbury Road north of Tridelphia
- Schoolhouse No. 17 – Built prior to 1860 along Woodbine Road near Lisbon
- Schoolhouse No. 21 – Built prior to 1860 along modern Grace Drive chemical facility
- Schoolhouse No. 22 – Built prior to 1847. 1st district.
- Schoolhouse No. 26 – Built prior to 1847 in 1st district with Thomas J Talbot, George H Pocock, George Hopper
- Schoolhouse No. 27 – Built prior to 1847 in 2nd district with John W Warfield, Johnathan Mariott and Thomas D Griffith
- Schoolhouse No. 28 – Built prior to 1847 in 2nd district with Phillip Mipel, Rezin Gaither and Greenbury Johnson trustees
- Schoolhouse No. 29 – Built prior to 1847 in 1st district with Evan Scott, George Stuchcomb and Richard Davis trustees
- Schoolhouse No. 30 – Built prior to 1847 in 1st district with Anthony Smith, Thomas G David and Nicholas J Baritt trustees
- Schoolhouse No. 31 – Built prior to 1847 in 1st district with George Hamilton, Charles G Haslip and Thoedore Dalman trustees
- Schoolhouse No. 32 – Built prior to 1847 with Linry Martin, Wilson S Hobbs and Beal Whalen trustees
- Schoolhouse No. 32 – Built prior to 1847
- Schoolhouse No. 33 – Built prior to 1847 in 3rd district with Berry Hord Jent, John Thompson and Thomas Barnes trustees
- Schoolhouse No. 34 – Built prior to 1847 in 3rd district with James Hobbs, James T Henderson and Asbury Peddicord trustees
- Schoolhouse No. 35 – Built prior to 1847 in 3rd district with Basil Duvall, James A Merideth and Philemon Warfield trustees
- Schoolhouse No. 36 – Built prior to 1847 in 3rd district with Nathan Shipley, D.E. Hopkins and William W Warfield trustees
- Schoolhouse No. 37 – Built prior to 1847 in 3rd district with Nathanial Clary, Luther Welsh and Adam Delauder trustees
- Schoolhouse No. 39 – Built prior to 1847 in 3rd district with James E Matthews, Mortimer Dorsey and Laird T Owings trustees
- Schoolhouse No. 40 – Built prior to 1847 in 3rd district with George W. Warfield, Ephriam Hobbs and John Selby trustee
- Schoolhouse No. 42 – Built prior to 1847 in 2nd district with Wesley Linthicum, William W Watkins and James Jenklo trustees
- Schoolhouse No. 44 – Built prior to 1847. 1st district.
- Schoolhouse No. 45 – Built prior to 1847. 2nd district.
- Schoolhouse No. 46 – Built prior to 1847. 1st district.
- Schoolhouse No. 47 – Built prior to 1847. 2nd district.
- Sykesville Colored School – November 1888. Operated in a home rented for $60 per year. Carroll County children attended until 1900.
- Waterloo Junior High School – Opened 1955
- Woodland School No.9 – Built on the Burgess farm in Glenelg on Tridelphia road. Named after school superintendent Woodland Phillips. Later converted to a home for the Burgess family.
- Woodstock School – Land bought in 1897, school closed in 1936. Land sold to Elston Seward for $100, and George E Peddicord for $75.
