= Edgewood Farm =

- Location within Maryland
- 39°14′14″N 76°53′47″W
- Location: 11031 Gaither Farm Rd, Ellicott City, MD 21042

Site notes
- Architectural style: Farm Vernacular
- Governing body: Private

Edgewood Farm is a historic farm located at Ellicott City next to Clarksville and Columbia, Howard County, Maryland, United States.

The historic 253 acre farm is affiliated with the Dorsey, Clark and Gaither families of Howard County. The property was once part of the Charles Carroll Estate. A wood framed farm house was built onsite, as well as a stone barn. A nineteenth century onsite cemetery contains the remains of several of the Clark and Dorsey family.

On 18 May 1833, William Gibbons inherited the property in a trust before the formation of Howard County from Anne Arundel County. The property was conveyed to Michael Dorsey, then Owen Dorsey. The farm passed ownership several times to Mr and Mrs. W. Clark Gaither.

The county's only major aircraft incident occurred at Homewood in 1962. A Vickers Viscount disabled by a bird strike crashed on the farm killing all aboard.

By 1978 the property was subdivided to just 92 acres. The remaining farm has been subdivided for residential development and for use by the Howard County Public School system. The farmhouse was demolished for new house construction with the stone barn retained as a residential car garage. The Gaither farm is also referenced as the "Homewood" farm after the Baltimore Estate of the Carroll Family.

== See also ==
- United Airlines Flight 297 1962 Aircraft crash killing 17 at the site.
- Homewood (Ellicott City, Maryland)
