= Atholton High School =

Public high school in Columbia, Maryland, U.S.

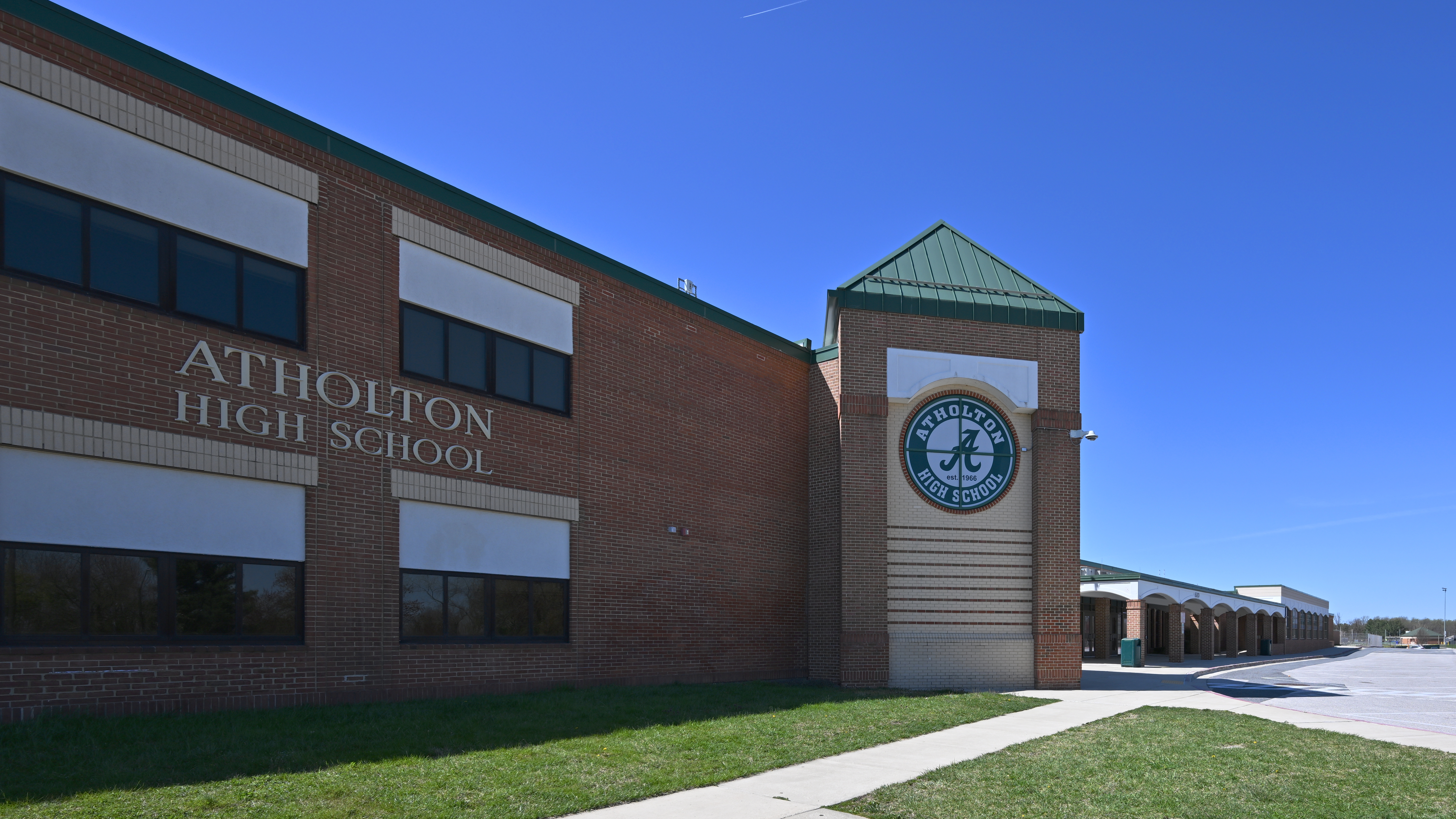
- Main building, April 2023

Location
- 6520 Freetown Road; Columbia, Maryland 21044; United States; 39.1895°N 76.8809°W

Information
- Type: Public Secondary
- Established: 1966
- School district: Howard County Public Schools
- Principal: Shawn Hastings-Hauf
- Grades: 9–12
- Enrollment: 1,540 (2024)
- Colors: Green and White
- Mascot: Raider
- Newspaper: The Raider Review
- Website: ahs.hcpss.org

Atholton High School is a public high school in Columbia, Maryland, United States and is a part of the Howard County Public School System. The school hosts an Army JROTC program. The school mascot is the Raider.

== History ==
Atholton takes its name from a 600-acre (240 ha) land grant named "Athol" granted from King Charles to James MacGill 17 August 1732. He built a nearby manor house named "Athol" built between 1732 and 1740. The name "Athol" was created to honor MacGill's ancestral home in Scotland. In 1845, Nicolas Worthington freed seventeen of his slaves, and gave them 150 acres (61 ha) of the "Athol enlarged" land which was then called "Freetown". The community was briefly a postal town named Atholton, Maryland. The school sites were later considered part of Simpsonville, Maryland, and later Columbia, Maryland.

The Howard County school system was segregated since the building of the Ellicott City Colored School in 1888. The first Atholton school was a one-room colored school house next to Locust Church given by John R. and Susie Clark in 1885. Students transferred to Guilford in 1939. School property was bought for $200 by the Locust Church. In 1941, an additional acre was not accounted for, then sold on a separate bid for $701 to Herbert M Brown.

=== Harriet Tubman site ===
In 1948, a new 10-room high school called Atholton Colored School was ordered. It was designed by Francis Thuman to be built in Simpsonville with a $280,000 budget. The cornerstone was set on September 25, 1948, by the Colored Masonic Lodge. Clarksville students were used to operate the bulldozers used in grading. At the students request, the school was renamed to the Harriet Tubman High School. In 1954, Segregation was outlawed by the supreme court in Brown v. Board of Education. Howard County eliminated one class of segregated students a year, taking 11 years to implement integrated classes. Modern accounts of the development of Columbia note that Rouse Company donated land for public schools, but prior to the requirement, the company sold unusable land from its 1963 purchases to build Columbia back to the school board. The company sold 10 usable acres (4.0 ha), and 10 unbuildable acres adjoining the school, at market rate, to "meet new state standards".

The High School would later be renamed the Harriet Tubman building, to be used by the Board of Education. In 1981 Grassroots Crisis Center operated a homeless shelter from the facility. In 2006, James N. Robey issued $1.6 million in Howard County loans to Grassroots to build an enlarged homeless facility on the Atholton School grounds. Centered around the 50th anniversary of desegregation at the school, The Howard County Center of African American Culture has petitioned to relocate from Oakland Manor to the Harriet Tubman building. The offices used by school system were listed as the top endangered historical site in Howard county by Preservation Howard County in 2015.

=== Atholton High School ===
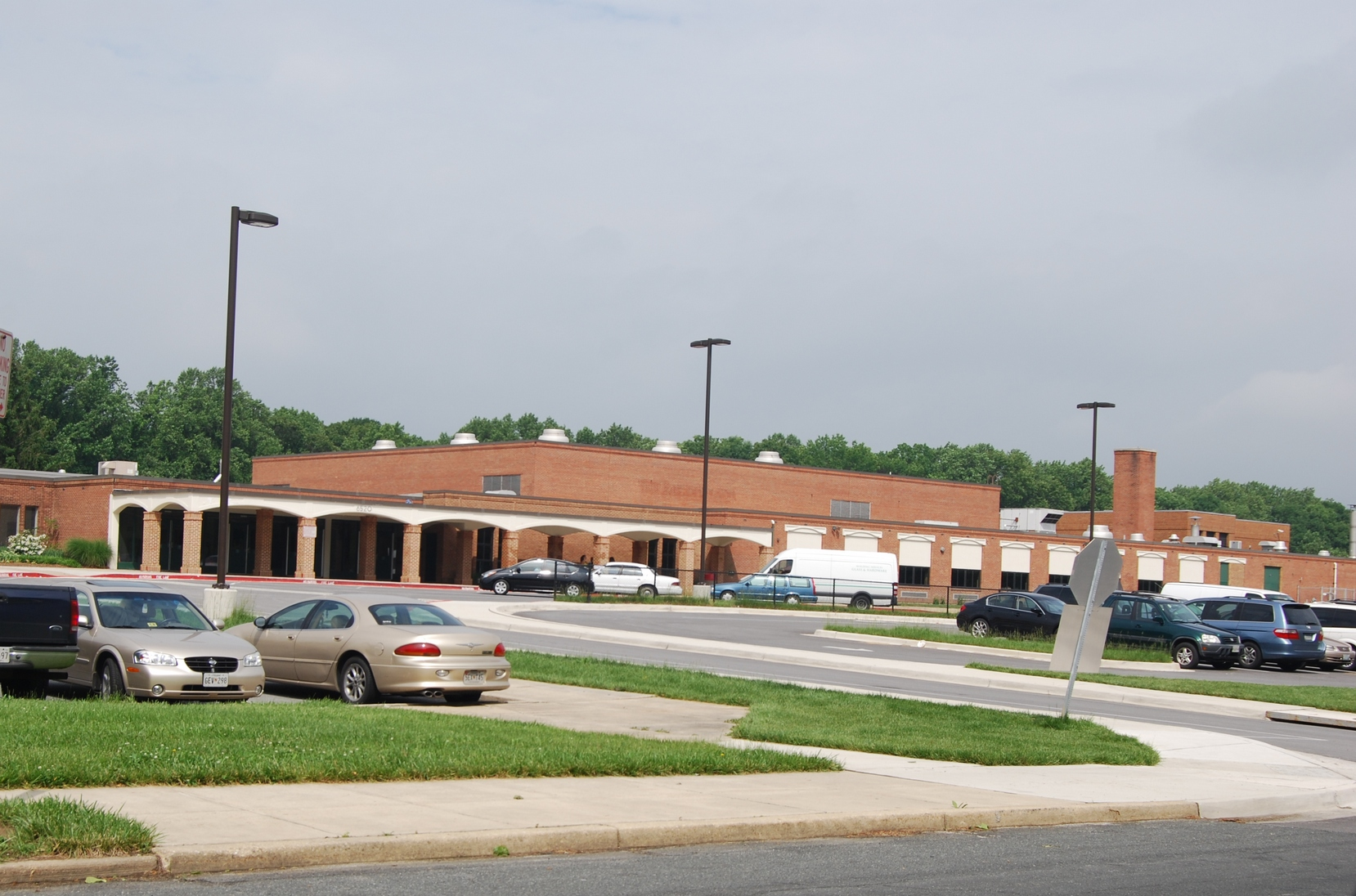
Atholton High School

In 1966 a new integrated high school was built alongside the old school taking the name Atholton High School. The school has been renovated and expanded several times. In 2012 a $51.3 million project was started to renovate the school again with students in place. The structure will use temporary classrooms in its expansion from 206,000 square ft to 250,000 sf. During the summer of 2024, a vestibule was added to the school.

=== Incidents ===
In early April 2026, Principal Nicholas Novak was put on leave for the remainder of the school year after an altercation with a group of students in the school cafeteria. Novak approached the group and yelled at them after he saw them throwing their food. Novak then used a student's homework to clean up spilled milk on one of the cafeteria tables and threw it into the group of students before sending them to his office. The altercation was recorded by a nearby student.

== Students ==
Atholton's student population has been in flux over the past 15 years. As of April 2024, Atholton is designed for 1,530 students with a current enrollment of 1,498 students, making Atholton a 3A school.

The student population as of September 2023 is ≤5% Native American or Alaskan, 18.5% Asian, 31.4% Black or African American, ≤5% Hawaiian or Pacific Islander, 13.5% Hispanic or Latino, 28.3% White or Caucasian, and 8.1% Two or more races.

Student population
1993	1994	1995	1996	1997	1998	1999	2000	2001	2002	2003	2004	2005	2006	2007	2008	2009	2020	2023	2024
1,162	1,241	1,407	1,487	1,120	1,070	1,094	1,113	1,182	1,218	1,154	1,198	1,251	1,365	1,370	1,442	1,474	1,472	1,498	1,540

== Athletics ==
Atholton has won the following state championships & athletic accomplishments:

- 2021 - Baseball, 3A East Region II Champions, State Championship Runner-up
- 2019 - Girls' Volleyball, 3A State Champions
- 2018 - Girls Outdoor Track and Field, State Champions
- 2017 - Ice Hockey, Howard Conference Finalist, State Semi-Finalist
- 2017 - Ice Hockey, Howard Conference Champions, Undefeated
- 2017 - Girls Basketball, 3A State Finalists
- 2016 - Girls' Volleyball, 3A State Champions
- 2016 - Ice Hockey, Howard Conference Varsity Finalist, State Semi-Finalist
- 2015 - Ice Hockey, Howard Conference Varsity Finalist, State Semi-Finalist
- 2014 - Golf District 3A Champion
- 2014 - Ice Hockey, Howard Conference Varsity Champions, State Semi-Finalist
- 2013 - Ice Hockey, Howard Conference Varsity Champions, State Semi-Finalist
- 2012 - Ice Hockey, Maryland Student Hockey League State 2A Varsity Champions
- 2012 - Ice Hockey, Howard Conference 2A Varsity Champions
- 2012 - Field Hockey, 3A State Champions
- 2012 - Girls' Golf County Champions
- 2011 - Howard County Football Champions
- 2011 - Boys' Indoor Track
- 2008 - Boys' Cross Country
- 2007 - Girls' Basketball
- 2007 - Tennis Mixed Doubles
- 2006 - Boys' Indoor Track 3A-2A
- 2005 - Girls' Track & Field
- 2004 - Boys' Soccer
- 2003 - Ice Hockey, Howard Conference 2A Varsity Champions
- 2002 - Ice Hockey, Howard Conference 2A Varsity Champions
- 2002 - Baseball
- 2001 - Girls' Track & Field
- 1998 - Boys' Indoor Track 2A-1A
- 1997 - Boys' Indoor Track 2A-1A
- 1997 - Boys' Track & Field
- 1996 - Boys' Track & Field
- 1995 - Boys' Indoor Track 2A-1A
- 1995 - Tennis Mixed Doubles
- 1990 - Boys' Soccer
- 1989 - Girls' Volleyball
- 1989 - Boys' Cross Country
- 1989 - Girls' Cross Country
- 1988 - Girls' Volleyball
- 1988 - Girls' Cross Country
- 1988 - Ice Hockey, Founding Member, Maryland Student Hockey League
- 1987 - Girls' Cross Country
- 1967 - Boys' Cross Country

== Notable alumni ==
- Sofia Harrison, defender for the Philippines women's national football team, played in the 2023 FIFA Women's World Cup
- Derek Phillips, former footballer for the Trinidad and Tobago national football team, later head coach of the Atholton High School Men's Varsity Soccer, left after 2023–2024 school year.
- John H. Brodie, theoretical physicist
- Jack Douglass, YouTube celebrity
- Gallant, singer-songwriter
- Lauren Giddings, graduate of Mercer Law School and murder victim
- Greg Hawkes, keyboardist for The Cars
- Thomas Hong, short track speed skater
- Brendan Iribe, former CEO and co-founder of Oculus Rift
- Josh Kelly, actor
- Vanessa Atterbeary, Democratic member of the Maryland House of Delegates
- Courtney Watson, Democratic member of the Maryland House of Delegates
- Allan H. Kittleman, former Howard County Executive, former Maryland State Senator and Minority Leader
- Alan Landsman, former vocalist and bass guitarist (member of Poison the Well) and convicted mail fraudster
- Steve Lombardozzi Jr., former infielder in the Miami Marlins organization
- Tatyana McFadden, Paralympian athlete and first person, able bodied or other, to win the four major marathons in the same year (Boston Marathon, London Marathon, New York Marathon, and the Chicago Marathon)
- DeWanda Wise, actress
- Lyn Lapid, Filipino-American singer-songwriter

== Special programs ==
- Raider Review (school newspaper)
- FIRST Robotics

== See also ==
- Harriet Tubman School
- Howard County Public Schools
