= Harriet Tubman School =

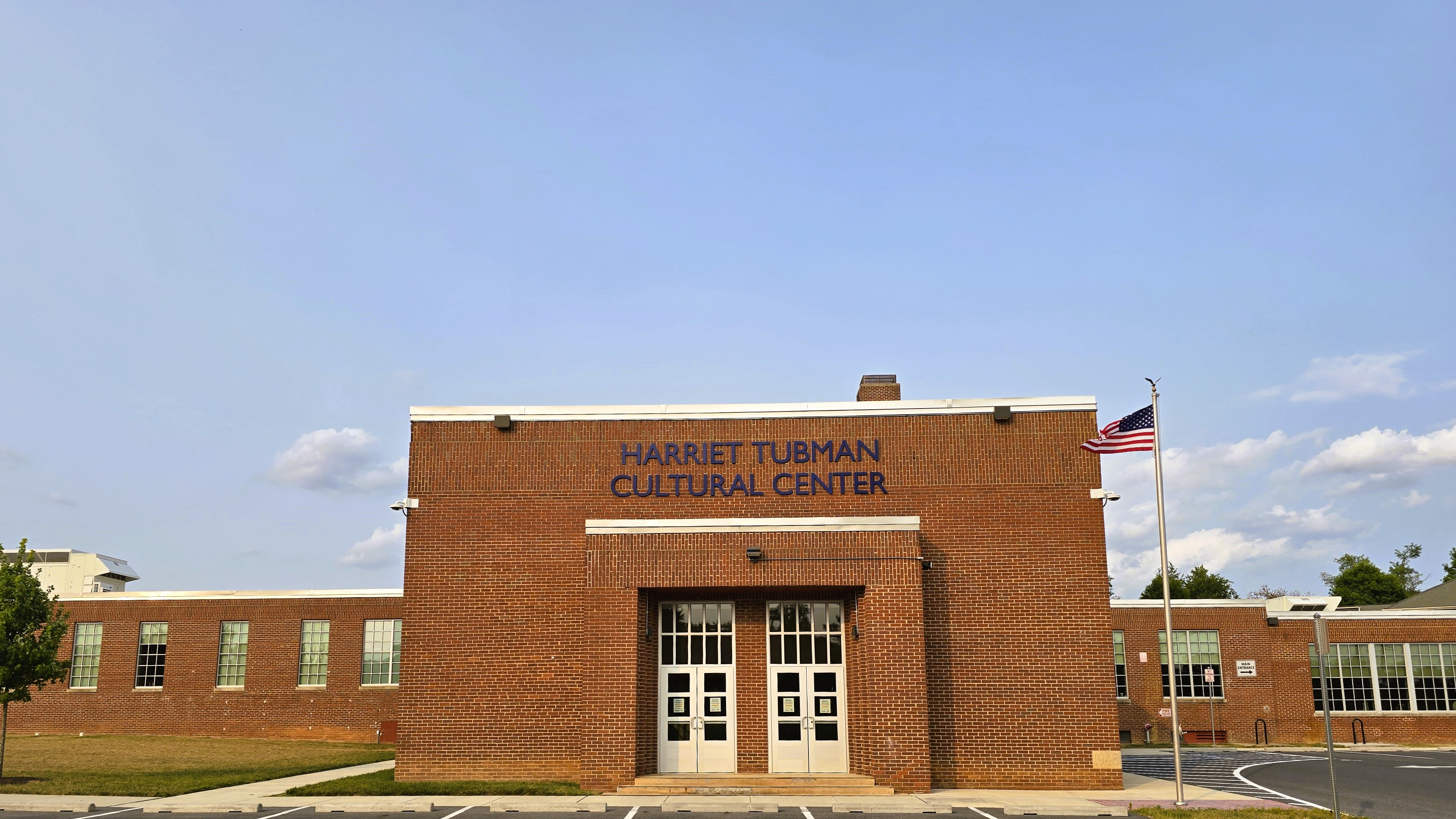

Location
- 8045 Harriet Tubman Lane; Columbia, Maryland

Information
- Type: Public, segregated
- Founded: 1949
- Closed: 1965
- School district: Howard County Public School System
- Last updated: September 6, 2025

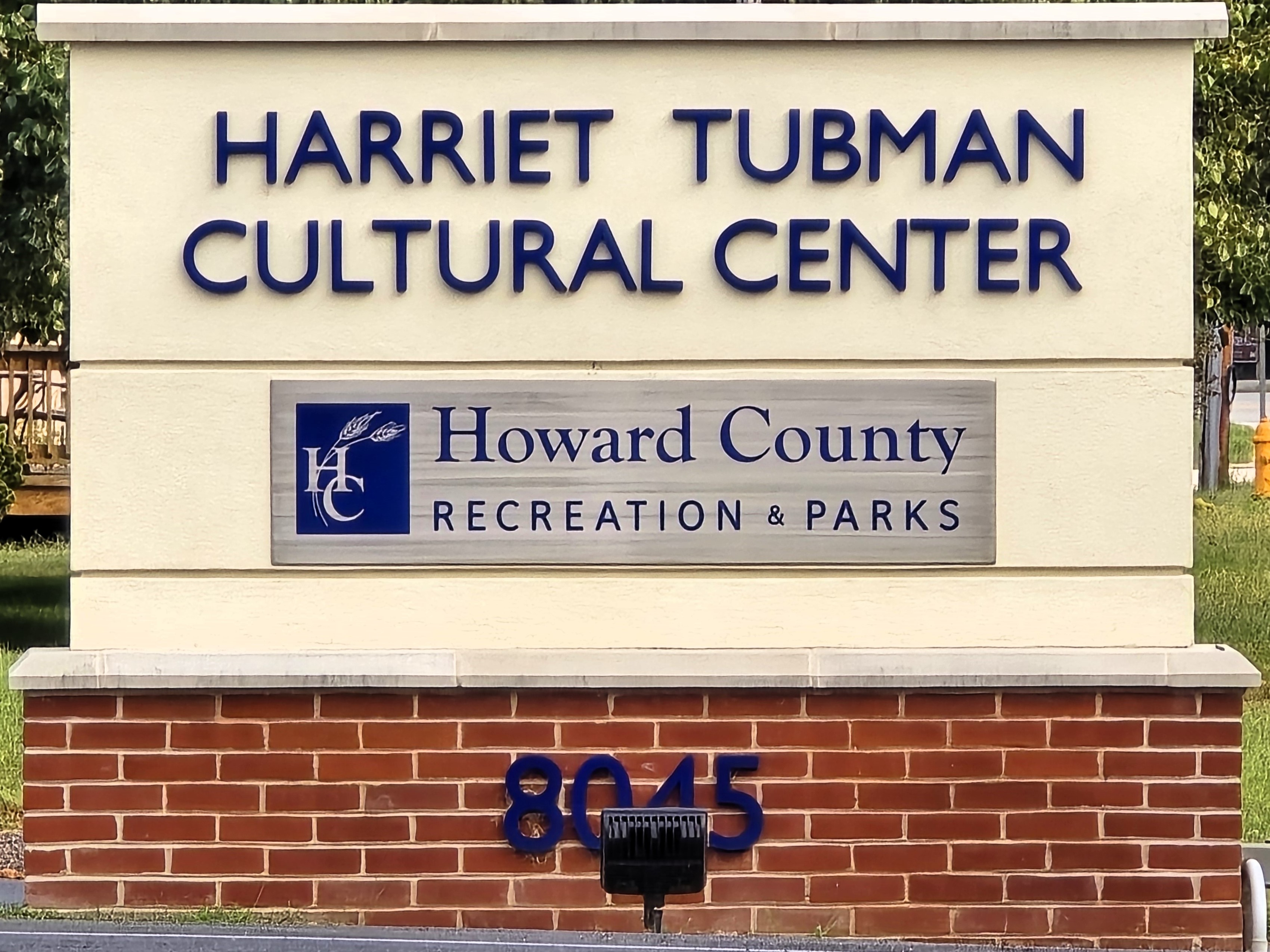
Sign at the parking lot entrance to the Harriet Tubman Cultural Center

Harriet Tubman School was a segregated public school in Columbia, Maryland, operating from 1949 to 1965. It was part of Howard County Public School System. The building has been repurposed as the Harriet Tubman Cultural Center.

== History ==
Harriet Tubman School was the last operating segregated school in the Howard County Public School System. The historic building has been re-purposed for use by the school system for maintenance offices.

Howard County's first classes for African American children beyond 7th grade was held in Cooksville in 1937. The four room school house expanded to 11 grade levels by 1939 to become the county's sole school offering high school level classes. The Harriet Tubman school, in Simpsonville, was established as the first dedicated high school for African Americans in 1948 with the first graduating class in 1952. In July 1953, an addition designed by Francis J Thurman was built by Aetna Construction Company for $67,944 (~$634,346 in 2024) increasing the size of the school to 26,000 square feet (2,400 m^{2}). In 1956, a $50,000 (~$440,590 in 2024) shop building was approved while the school board was under scrutiny for delaying integration of Howard County Schools after the supreme court ruling. Harriet Tubman operated for 16 years as a segregated school and was closed rather than integrated. The school closed in 1965. An all new school known as Atholton High was championed to be built on the same property by local residents rather than integrate white students into the Harriet Tubman School. The Rouse Company had recently bought land adjacent to the school and planned to sell back 20 acres (8.1 ha) at cost to the school board. In July 1964, Tom Harris of the planning commission presented a recommendation from Loren Murray of Johannes & Murray to pass on any additions to the Harriet Tubman school and buy the adjoining 10 acres (4.0 ha) for $12,000 (~$92,491 in 2024) from Columbia Research and Development to build an all new high school.

A public effort was initiated in the early 2000s to turn over the building for a cultural center. The Harriet Tubman Cultural Center officially opened in September 2022.
