= Guilford Park High School =

Public high school in Jessup, Maryland, U.S.

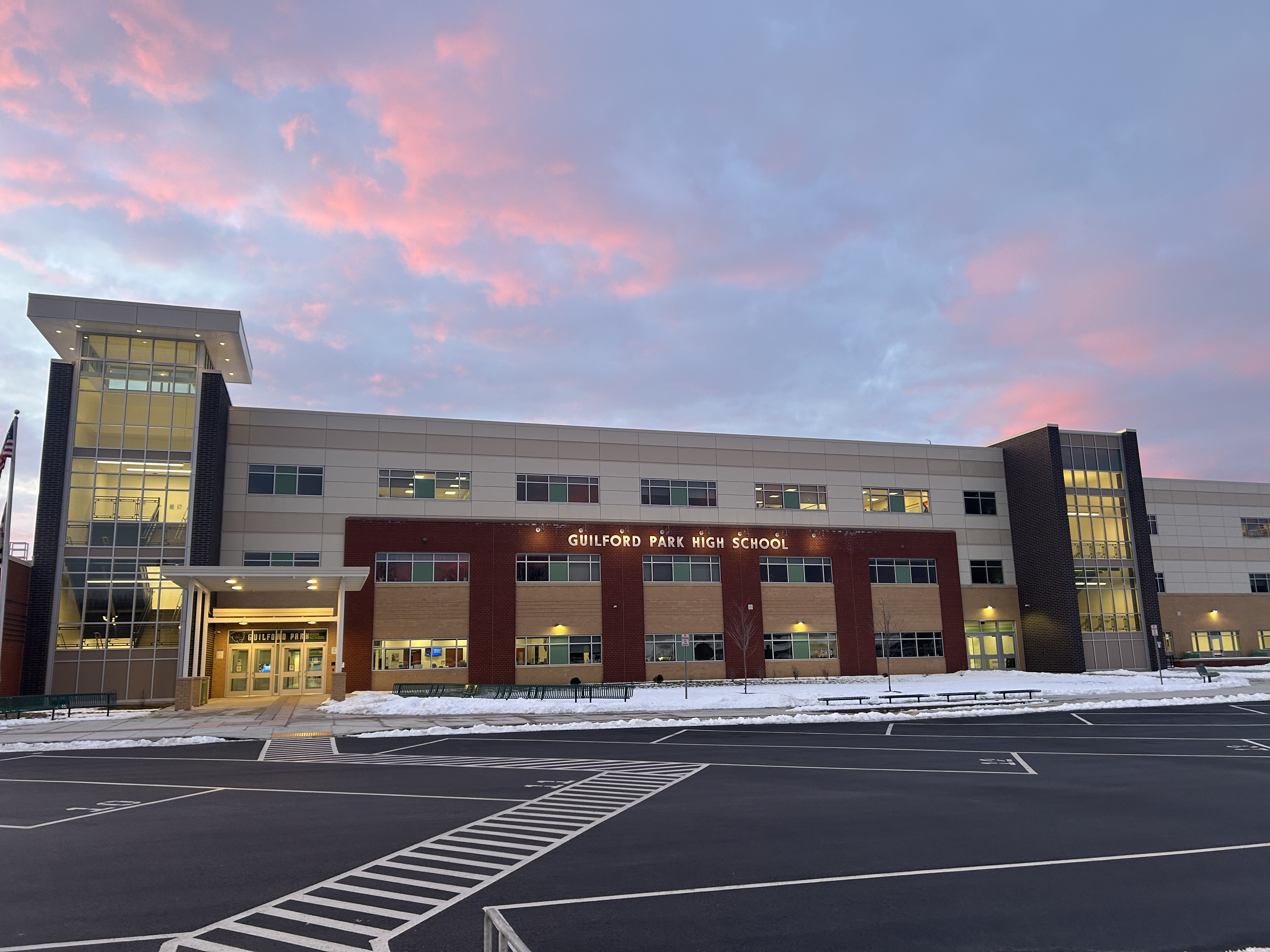

Location
- 8500 Ridgelys Run Rd; Jessup, Maryland 20794; United States; 39.1558°N 76.8098°W

Information
- Type: Public high school
- Established: 2023; 3 years ago
- School district: Howard County Public Schools
- CEEB code: 268061
- NCES School ID: 240042090490
- Principal: Joshua Wasilewski
- Grades: 9–12
- Gender: Co-educational
- Campus size: 42-acre (170,000 m^{2})
- Campus type: Suburban
- Colors: Green and blue
- Mascot: Panther
- Website: gphs.hcpss.org

Guilford Park High School is a public high school located in Jessup, Maryland, United States. It is part of the Howard County Public School System. It is the largest high school ever constructed in HCPSS.

The school opened in August 2023 with 750 freshmen and sophomores, having a total capacity of 1,658.

Its mascot is the panther and its colors are green and blue.

The campus consists of 42 acres, 289,161 gross square feet. There are 40 general classrooms in the building, including three teaching spaces for technology education and 10 flexible science classrooms. The cafeteria has a capacity of 1,097. There are 579 parking spaces for cars and 33 parking spaces for buses.
