= Homewood (Ellicott City, Maryland) =

- Location within Maryland
- 39°15′00″N 76°54′00″W
- Nearest city: Ellicott City, Maryland

History
- Built: 1830, 1872, or circa-1876

Site notes
- Architectural style: Brick

Homewood is a stone house located off Homewood Road in Ellicott City in Howard County, Maryland, United States.

Homewood was built on the Carroll family's Doughoregan Manor for Robert Goodloe Harper Carroll (1839–1915), who served in Company K of the Confederate 1st Virginia Cavalry. He served with his younger brother Albert, who died in battle. The family home was passed on to R. G. Harper Carroll II, then to the Wright family. The house stayed in the Carroll family until the 1960s before it went through a series of owners including a Rouse Company executive and the administrator of Howard County General Hospital. In 1996 Joan Cochran, wife of former county Executive Edward L. Cochran, listed the 14-acre property for sale for $1.4 million.

Homewood has six fireplaces, library, wine cellar and grand foyer. The house offers six bedrooms and a gourmet kitchen.

The Homewood Center for disruptive and emotionally disturbed youths was built near the site in 2002, and given the name Homewood Alternative Learning Center to sound "elegant".

== See also ==
- Doughoregan Manor
- Homewood Museum – Carroll estate in Baltimore
- Edgewood Farm, "Gaither Farm", "Homewood Farm"
