= Homewood Center =

Public school in Ellicott City, Maryland, U.S.

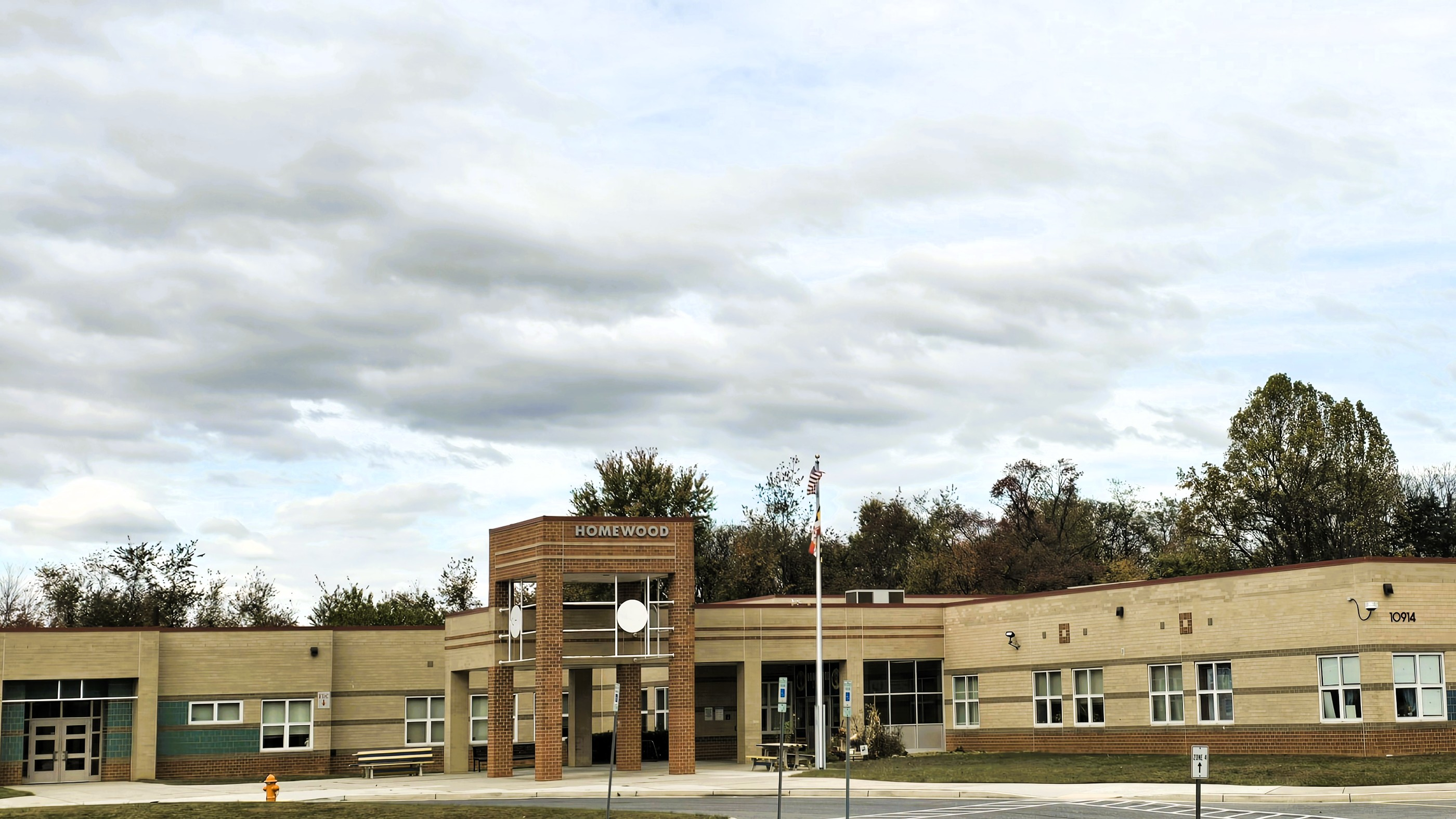

Location
- 10914 Clarksville Pike; Ellicott City, Maryland 21042; United States; 39.236923°N 76.8928634°W

Information
- School type: Community school
- Established: 2002
- School district: Howard County Public Schools
- NCES School ID: 240042001189
- Principal: Christopher Rattay
- Grades: 6–12
- Campus: Small city
- Color: Orange Blue used but unofficial: Yellow
- Mascot: Phoenix
- Website: hc.hcpss.org

Homewood Center, also known as Homewood School, is a public secondary institution in Ellicott City, Maryland, United States; it is part of the Howard County Public School System. The school hosts nontraditional classroom programs for Howard County students in grades 6-12.

== History ==
In 2001, the Board of Education of Howard County, Maryland began soliciting bids for the construction of a new Alternative Learning Center. The Homewood Center was built in 2002 near the historic Homewood estate. The name was selected by a committee who chose not to add the words "Alternative Learning Center." A spokesperson reported that "we wanted to make the school as elegant as we could possibly make it." Homewood is located on the same campus as the Applications and Research Lab and the HCPSS central offices. It is part of the Howard County Public School System. The school does not have a Parent-Teacher Association. In 2004, the principal of Oakland Mills High School was transferred by the Howard County Public School System superintendent to Homewood School amid a grade-changing scandal. Consequently, the current principal of Homewood was moved to fill the vacancy at Oakland Mills.

== Academics ==
The Homewood Center hosts nontraditional classroom programs for middle and high school students. These courses are often designed for students who have not performed well in conventional classroom settings. This may be due to "legal infractions, behavior challenges, or emotional disabilities." Students attend Homewood on "referral" from other county middle and high schools. Homewood has three special education programs. One of these programs, Gateway, is designed for students with behavioral problems. In 2004, officials designated the Homewood Center as a trouble facility under the federal No Child Left Behind Act. This was because the Center did not show signs of improvement after two consecutive years. The school was entered into the state school improvement program where it would receive additional support and resources, but face strict administrative regulation.

Starting in 2007, Homewood hosts an annual career fair to help students learn about different career opportunities. Local business owners and other professionals come to give presentations. Members of the student government serve as hosts for these local speakers.

Since 2012, the Center implements restorative practices. These practices are required to take place at least once a week in every class, sometimes in the form of a "restorative justice circle." According to state data, in 2012, 87.1 percent of the students at the Center passed the required high school standardized assessments in algebra and data analysis, biology, and English.
