= Owen Brown, Columbia, Maryland =

Coordinates: 39°11′16″N 76°50′34″W

Owen Brown
- Village
- Interactive map of Owen Brown
- Country: United States
- State: Maryland
- City: Columbia
- Established: 1975
- Named after: Postmaster Owen Brown

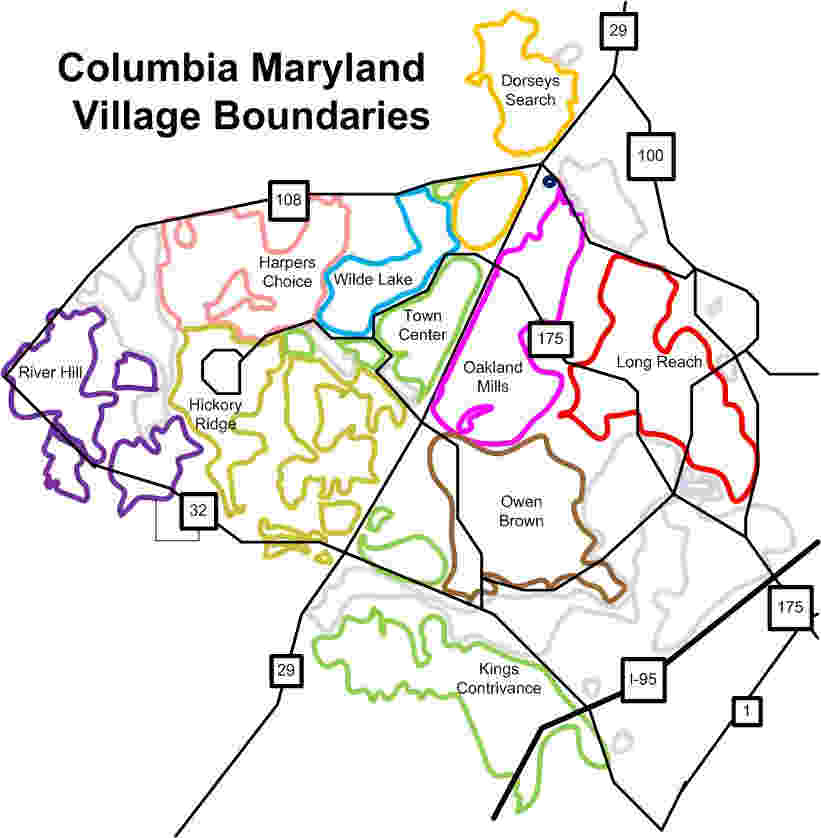
Columbia Villages

Owen Brown is one of the ten villages in Columbia, Maryland, United States, established in 1972. Neighborhoods in the village include Dasher Green, Elkhorn and Hopewell. Owen Brown lies south and east of the town center.

The village contains the 37-acre (150,000 m^{2}) Lake Elkhorn, with a walking path of two miles (3 km) and a picnic pavilion in the 23-acre (93,000 m^{2}) park.

== History ==
Prior to the development of Columbia, an area road was known as Owen Brown Road, named for local postmaster and store owner Owen T. Brown who had once lived on it. Due to its proximity, Rouse Company planners used Owen Brown as an early working name for the village. The name stuck, and became the permanent name of the village when it opened in 1972.

Lake Elkhorn is named for the Elkhorn branch of the Little Patuxent River; Elk Horn Farms was also the name of the Dasher farm. Street names are taken from the works of Paul Laurence Dunbar.

Dasher Green is named for the 670-acre Dasher family farm purchased in May 1963 by one of the Rouse company land acquisition entities. The farm was systematically reduced in size from 1971 to 1978, with the last parcel sold for development in 1996. Street names are taken from the works of John Greenleaf Whittier.

Hopewell is named for the 200-acre land grant, Laswell's Hopewell, patented to Thomas Davis Sr. on December 6, 1728. The street names are taken from the works of Vachel Lindsay.

In 1976, Ryland Homes announced it would start construction on homes priced between $50,000 and $70,000. The Village would contain 18 percent section 8 housing as part of its broad spectrum of housing options. In 1977, Howard County temporarily held construction of housing by Washington Homes for multiple code violations on over 25 homes.

The Rouse Company was unable to procure the land around the Owen Brown Shopping Center, which remained independently operated outside of Rouse control with an anchor store leased by Giant Food.

== Services ==
The East Columbia branch of the Howard County Library is located in the village.

Dasher Green and Hopewell each have an outdoor pool.
