= Dasher Farm =

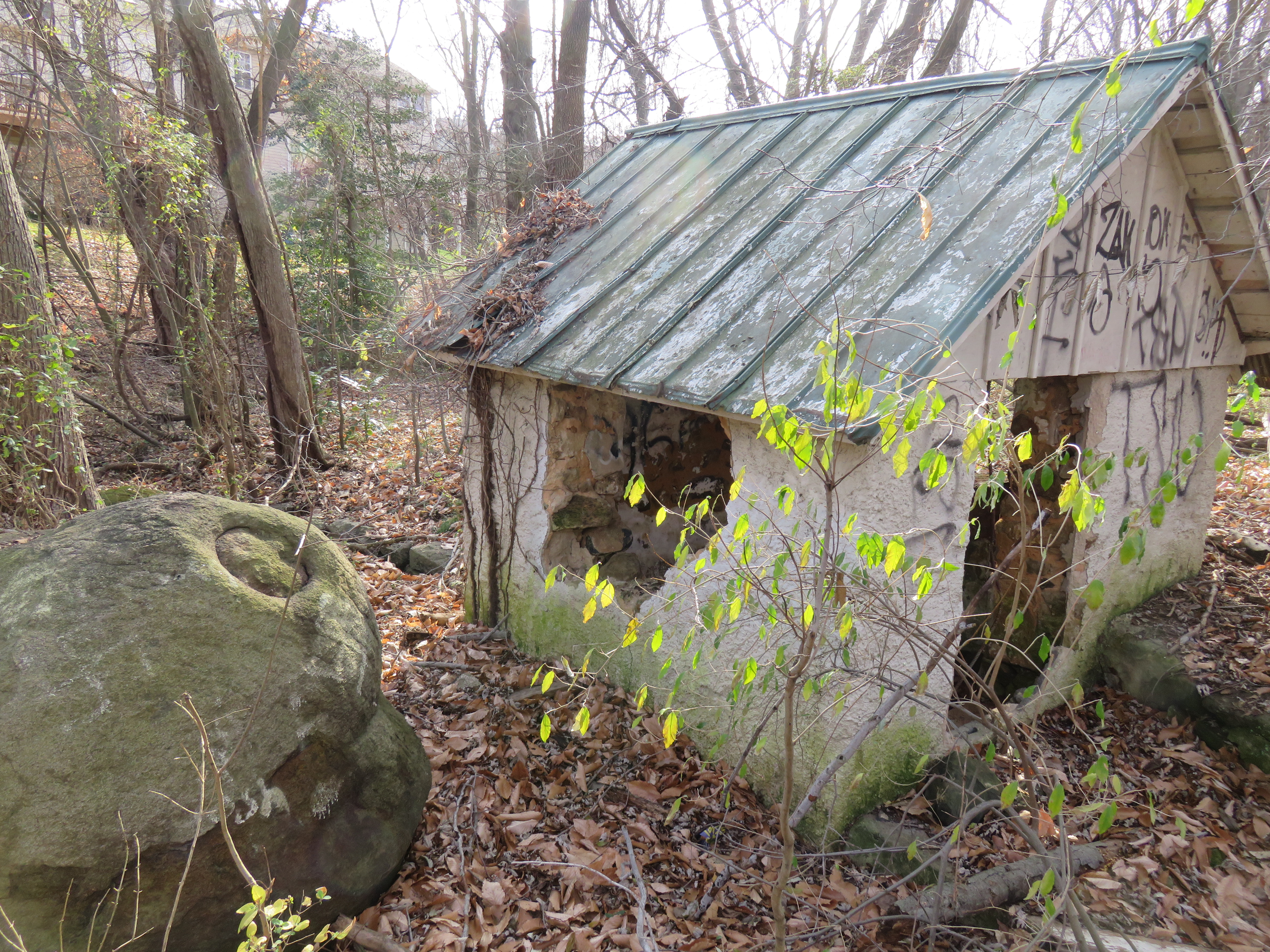
- Dasher Farm Springhouse in 2015

- Location within Maryland
- 39°11′24″N 76°50′35″W
- Location: Columbia, Maryland

Site notes
- Area: Columbia, Maryland
- Architectural style: Stone

The Dasher Farm is a historic farm located in Columbia, Howard County, Maryland, now part of the Rouse Company land development.

Hammond Dorsey operated Elkhorn plantation on the site. He split the property among his heirs into 90-acre parcels, one of which was purchased by Maurice and Dora Dasher in 1919 creating the Dasher Farm. M.E. Dasher and sons expanded the property to 480 acres in 1949.

A stone springhouse with stucco is the sole remaining historical building, left in an unpreserved state.

The Dasher Green neighborhood of the Village of Owen Brown is named for the 670-acre Dasher family farm purchased in May 1963 by one of the Rouse Company land acquisition entities. In 1971 the stone farm house was destroyed by fire. The farm was systematically reduced in size between 1971 and 1978, with the last parcel sold for development in 1996. All buildings were demolished to build townhouses named "Cradlerock Farm". Street names are taken from the works of John Greenleaf Whittier.

== See also ==
- List of Howard County properties in the Maryland Historical Trust
- Owen Brown, Columbia, Maryland
- Lake Elkhorn
