= United Air Lines Flight 297 =

1962 aviation accident

Coordinates: 39°14′28″N 76°54′05″W

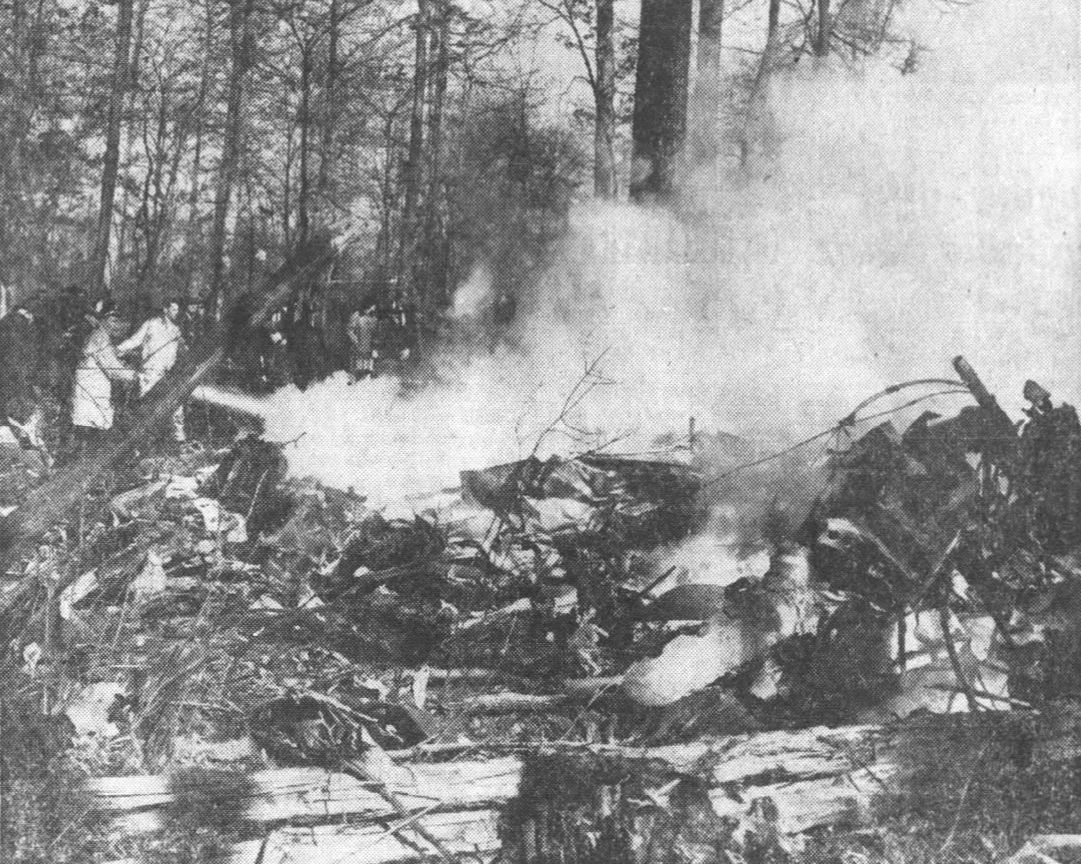
- Aftermath of the plane crash

Accident
- Date: November 23, 1962
- Summary: Bird strike
- Site: Howard County, near Ellicott City, Maryland, US

Aircraft
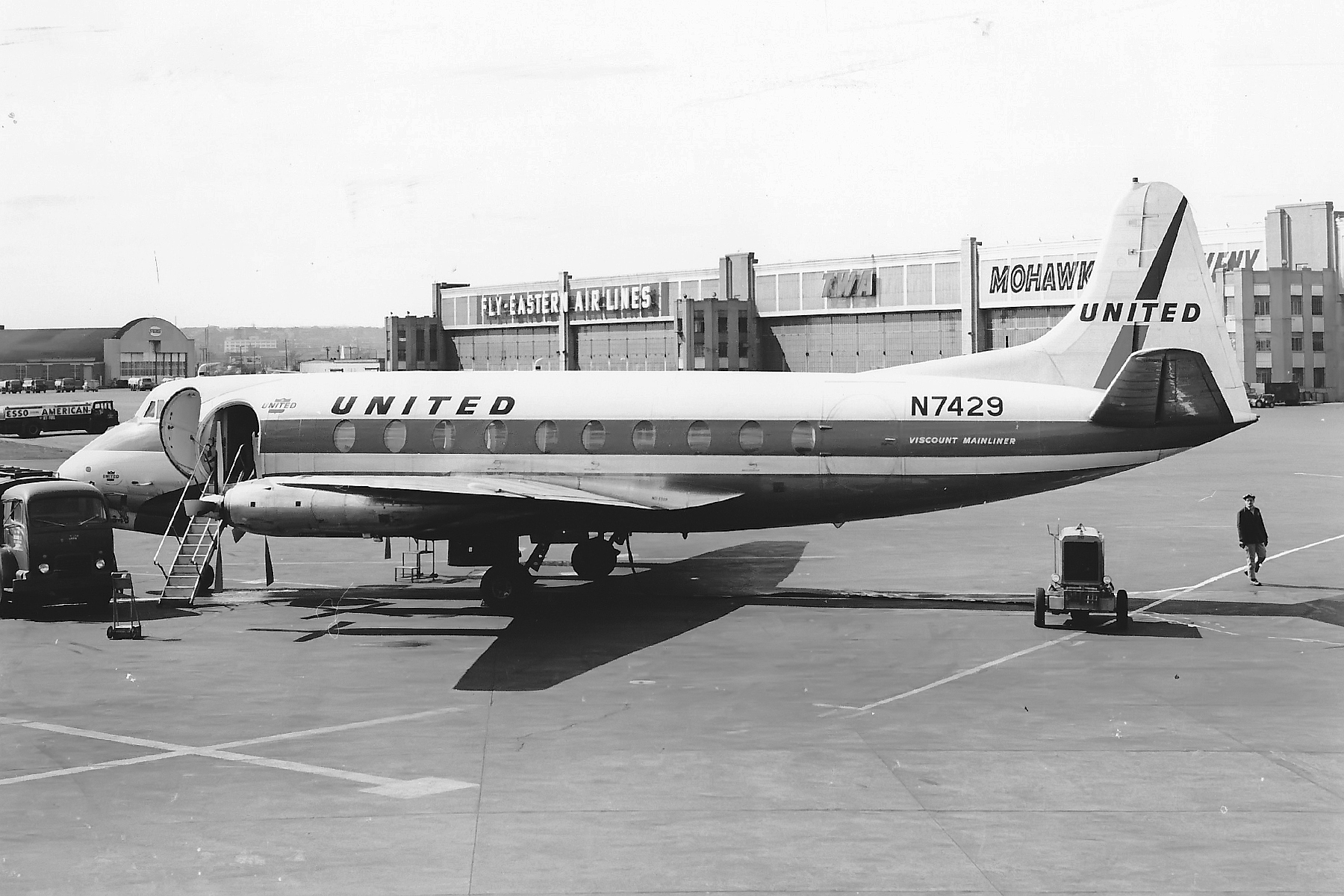
- A Vickers Viscount similar to the accident aircraft
- Aircraft type: Vickers Viscount 745D
- Operator: United Airlines
- Call sign: UNITED 297
- Registration: N7430
- Flight origin: Newark International Airport
- 1st stopover: Washington National Airport
- 2nd stopover: Raleigh–Durham Airport
- Last stopover: Charlotte Municipal Airport
- Destination: Atlanta Airport
- Occupants: 17
- Passengers: 13
- Crew: 4
- Fatalities: 17
- Survivors: 0

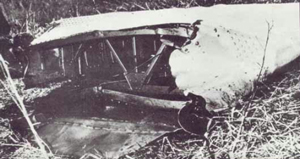
Wreckage of United Air Lines Flight 297

United Air Lines Flight 297 was a scheduled American flight from Newark International Airport to Atlanta that crashed 10 miles (16 km) southwest of Baltimore on November 23, 1962, killing all 17 people on board. An investigation concluded that the aircraft, a Vickers Viscount 745D turboprop airliner, had struck at least two whistling swans, which caused severe damage to the plane, resulting in a loss of control.

The accident resulted in a greater understanding of the amount of damage that can be caused by bird strikes during flight. As a result, the Federal Aviation Administration (FAA) issued new safety regulations that required newly certified aircraft to be able to better withstand in-flight impacts with birds without affecting the aircraft's ability to fly or land safely.

== Accident ==
The flight, flying as United Air Lines Flight 297, was a scheduled passenger flight from Newark to Atlanta, with stops at Washington National Airport, Raleigh–Durham Airport, and Charlotte Municipal Airport. It had 13 passengers and 4 crew members on board. The first leg of the flight was scheduled to last one hour at a true airspeed of 260 knots (300 mph; 480 km/h).

The plane departed Newark at 11:39 a.m. local time and proceeded normally until 12:14 p.m., when it was cleared to descend from 10,000 to 6,000 feet. At 12:19 p.m., air traffic controllers advised the flight that they had received numerous reports of large numbers of ducks and geese in the area, and the pilots acknowledged the report. At 12:22 p.m., Washington Approach directed the flight to turn left to a heading of 200 degrees, which was also confirmed by the pilots. An additional course change was transmitted at 12:23 p.m., but was not acknowledged. At 12:24 p.m., controllers lost radar contact with the plane.

The aircraft struck two whistling swans with its stabilizers at 6,000 feet. One of the birds caused only superficial damage to the right stabilizer, approximately one foot long and an eighth of an inch deep, while the other crashed completely through the left stabilizer and came out the other side. The impact caused the stabilizer to separate from the plane; it was found a quarter of a mile from the main wreckage. Investigators estimated that the crash might not have occurred if the two birds had hit the aircraft just a few inches higher or lower. The plane lost control, and in less than a minute, the aircraft's altitude dropped from approximately 6,000 feet to ground level, and its airspeed increased from 240 to 365 knots (280 to 420 mph; 440 to 680 km/h) indicated airspeed. The plane crashed 10 miles (16 km) southwest of Baltimore and exploded, killing all of the occupants.

== Aircraft ==
The aircraft was a Vickers Viscount 745D, a British medium-range turboprop airliner, serial number 128. It was registered as tail number N7430 and manufactured on June 30, 1956. At the time of the crash, it had a total of 18,809 logged flight hours. It was powered by four Rolls-Royce Dart 510 turboprop engines. United Airlines acquired the plane from Capital Airlines when the two companies merged in 1961. It was one of 60 built, and had a capacity of 48 passengers.

== Passengers and crew ==
The pilot of the plane was Milton Balog, of Pennsylvania, who was 39 years old. He had served as a pilot in the United States Army Air Corps flying a bomber in the European theater of World War II and had received the Distinguished Flying Cross. After the war, he took a job with Capital Airlines. The copilot was Robert Lewis, who was 32 years old. He held an airline transport pilot licence that had lapsed because he was overdue for a physical, but he was qualified and licensed to fly as a copilot with his commercial pilot license.

Of the thirteen passengers aboard the plane, six were off-duty employees of United Airlines.

== Investigation ==
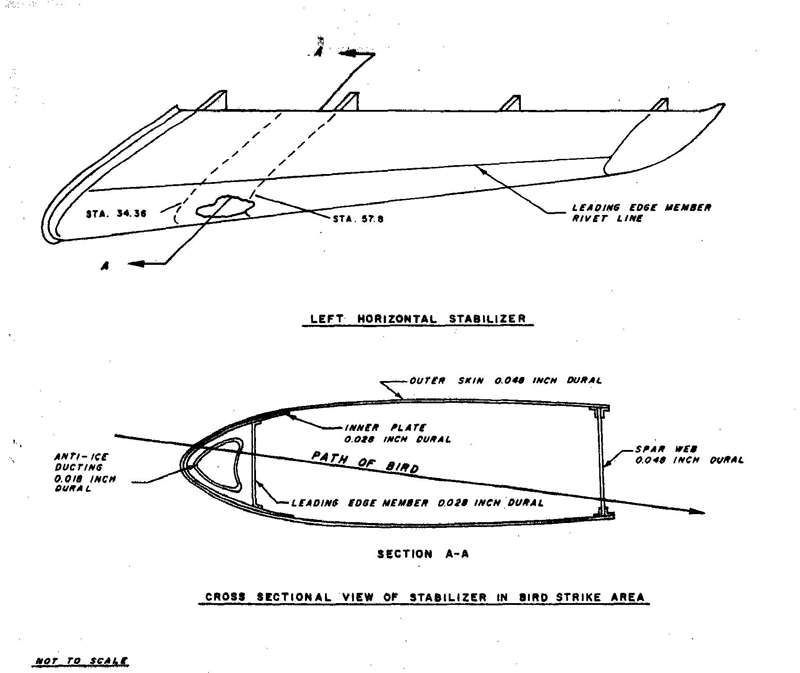
Diagram of damage observed on the left stabilizer

After the accident, a team of ten investigators from Washington arrived, headed by George A. Van Epps, the chief of safety investigation for the Civil Aeronautics Board. The wreckage from the plane was spread over an area of 100 to 150 yards (90 to 140 m) in diameter, with the largest piece of debris only 15 feet (4.6 m) long. A severe ground fire that broke out after the crash consumed most of the fuselage, right wing, and part of the left wing. The fire removed potential evidence of additional bird strikes that may have occurred on other parts of the aircraft, but the investigators were able to recover the flight recorder. Investigators reassembled critical parts of the aircraft at Washington National Airport, where they concluded that the aircraft had struck at least two birds.

A partial bird carcass as well as feathers, tissue, and blood was found 10 feet (3 m) from the separated section of the left stabilizer and was identified by the Chief Medical Examiner for the State of Maryland to be of bird origin. Specimens of feathers and bones found at the site were taken to the United States Fish and Wildlife Service, who identified them as belonging to whistling swans, birds that can attain weights in excess of 18 pounds (8 kg). A pilot in the vicinity of the flight had reported seeing a flock of approximately fifty very large white birds flying in a trail at approximately 5,500 feet. Other pilots in the area also said that air traffic controllers at Washington Center had reported radar contacts near them that the pilots identified as large flocks of birds.

The Civil Aeronautics Board released a final report of their investigation on March 22, 1963. The investigators concluded that the probable cause of the accident was "a loss of control following separation of the left horizontal stabilizer which had been weakened by a collision with a whistling swan." The board recommended that additional research be undertaken to determine the risks to modern aircraft from bird strikes and to learn how to increase safety of aircraft in the event of bird strikes.

== Legacy ==
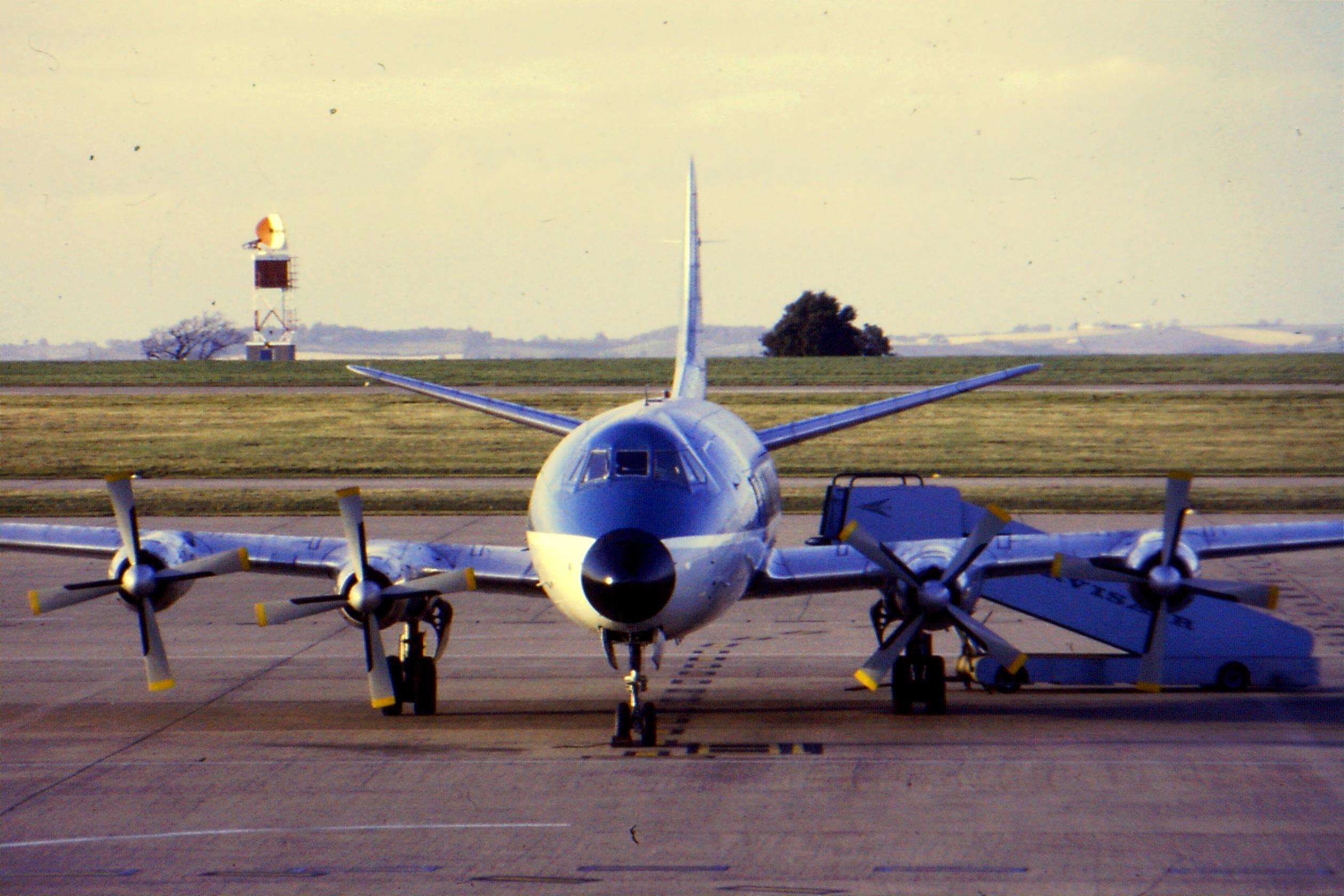
Front view of the Viscount, showing how the critical surfaces of the empennage are outside of the area shielded by the propellers

Before the accident, aircraft had been designed with the understanding that critical control surfaces of the aircraft were protected from bird strikes by the wings and the propellers of the aircraft. The design of the Viscount 745D created new vulnerabilities because the tailplane was mounted higher than the top of the propeller discs, and therefore was unprotected. The higher cruising speeds of newer aircraft also increased the amount of damage that could be caused by a bird, but nearly all of the prior research on the dangers of bird strikes had been conducted in the 1930s. The only airworthiness regulation that had been in effect about bird strike safety was Civil Air Regulations (CAR) 4b, which required the windshield of an aircraft to be able to withstand an impact from a four-pound (two-kilogram) bird at cruising speed.

As a result of the accident, the FAA reviewed data from other bird strike incidents and performed bird strike testing on several types of jet aircraft. The investigators concluded that most types of aircraft were inherently bird resistant, but a few types, including the type that crashed, were vulnerable in the empennage area. In 1968, the FAA proposed the addition of a rule requiring airplanes to be capable of safe flight and landing after an impact on the empennage by an eight-pound (four-kilogram) bird at cruising speed. The agency received a number of comments, some suggesting that the eight-pound bird limit was insufficient, and would not have prevented the crash of United Airlines Flight 297, others suggesting that the wings of aircraft were also vulnerable, not just the tail section.

On May 8, 1970, section 25.631 "Bird strike damage" of the Code of Federal Regulations took effect. This regulation added a requirement that the empennage structure of an aircraft must be designed to assure the capability of continued safe flight and landing after an impact with an eight-pound bird during flight at the likely operational speeds.

In the late 1960s and early 1970s, the Joint Aviation Authorities was formed to produce the Joint Aviation Requirements for certification of large aircraft in Europe. The Joint Aviation Requirements were largely based upon Section 25 of the U.S. Code of Federal Regulations. The regulations implemented in section 25.631 specified that the entire aircraft, not just the empennage, had to be designed to withstand a bird strike, but instead of an eight-pound bird, it specified only a four-pound bird.
