= Florence, Maryland =

Unincorporated community in Maryland, U.S.

Coordinates: 39°18′37″N 77°06′31″W

Florence is an unincorporated community in Howard County, Maryland, United States. A post office operated in Florence between June 17, 1868, and March 31, 1906. Governor Edwin Warfield taught in the neighborhood one room schoolhouse.

The town was named by Gassaway Watkins Warfield before his death in Camp Chase while serving in the Confederate Army. The town was located at the crossroads of Florence and Jennings Chapel roads. Jennings Chapel was named for Dr. Samuel Kennedy Jennings after the congregation relocated from the Crapster schoolhouse.

By 1870, the population increased to 16 and 25 by 1880.

Picketts general store for the town was destroyed by fire in 1909.

== See also ==
- Hubert Black House
