= Hubert Black House =

- Location within Maryland
- 39°20′00″N 77°06′00″W
- Nearest city: Woodbine, Maryland

History
- Built: 1860

Site notes
- Architectural style: Farm

Hubert Black House is a historic house and farm located in Woodbine (Formerly Florence), Howard County, Maryland. It was named after J. Hubert Black, a Howard County parole officer, and later, a County Commissioner who ran on a no growth platform in 1962, who approved the Rouse Company development of Columbia, Maryland.

The Black House sits on a 250-acre former dairy farmed by the Black family since 1883. The land is part of a group of original land patents named Hobson's Choice, Wise Man's Folly, Additional Defense, Range Declined, Acorn Hill, Ridgley's Great Park, The Dispute, and Dispute Ended. Former owners included Samuel and Amelia Jarden in 1872, Josuha D. Warfield in 1869, and Phillip Welsh in 1808. The house is a three-bay-wide 2 1/2-story building constructed in 1860 during the last years of slavery in the Howard District of Anne Arundel County.

== Larriland Farm ==
In 1963, G. Lawrence "Larry" Moore and his wife Nancy exchanged his 100-acre farm in Howard County with Commissioner J. Hubert Black, forming the 250-acre Larriland Farm. Black resold the 100-acre farm to become residential subdivisions for the Rouse Company project he approved. The Larriland farm was placed in the Maryland Agricultural Land Preservation Program. Outbuildings have been converted to shops for seasonal sales.

== See also ==
- Clark's Elioak Farm
