= Lake Elkhorn =

Reservoir in Columbia, Maryland, USA

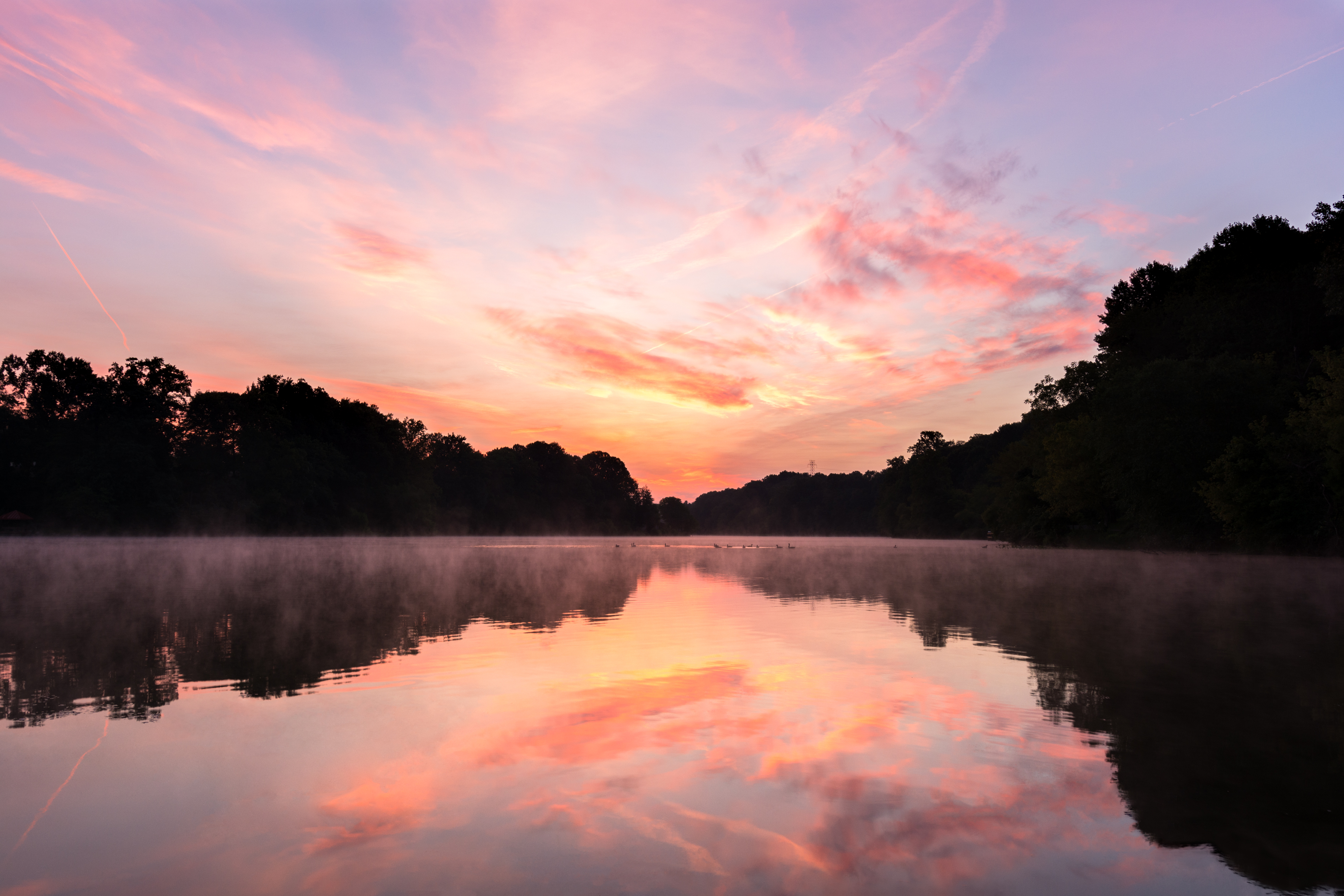
- View of Lake Elkhorn at Sunrise

- Location within Maryland Location within the United States
- Location: Columbia, Maryland
- Coordinates: 39°11′01″N 76°50′27″W
- Type: manmade
- Primary inflows: Elkhorn Branch of the Little Patuxent River
- Primary outflows: Little Patuxent River
- Basin countries: United States
- Surface area: 37 acres (15 ha)
- Surface elevation: 295 ft (90 m)

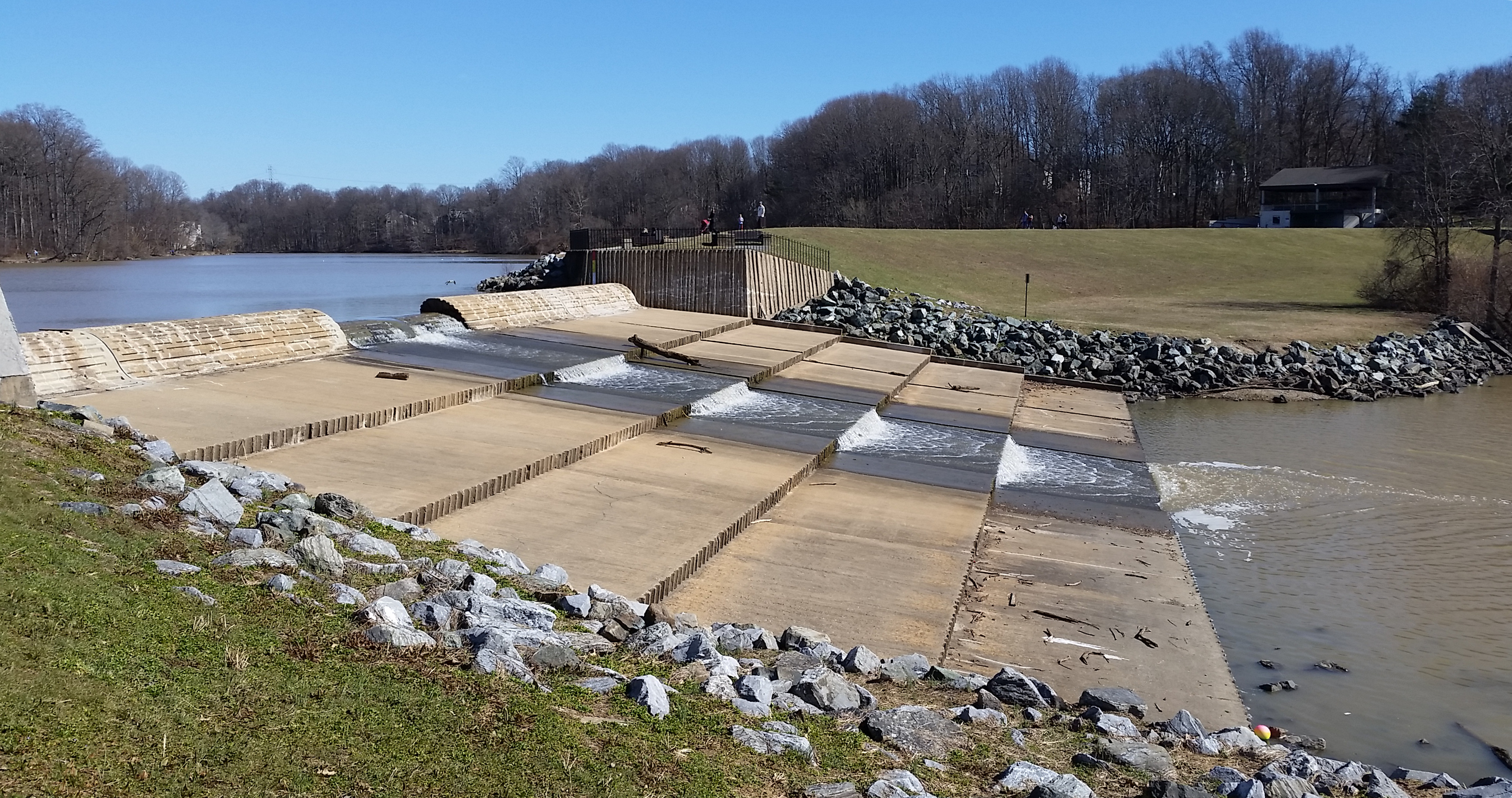
Spillway and dam of Lake Elkhorn

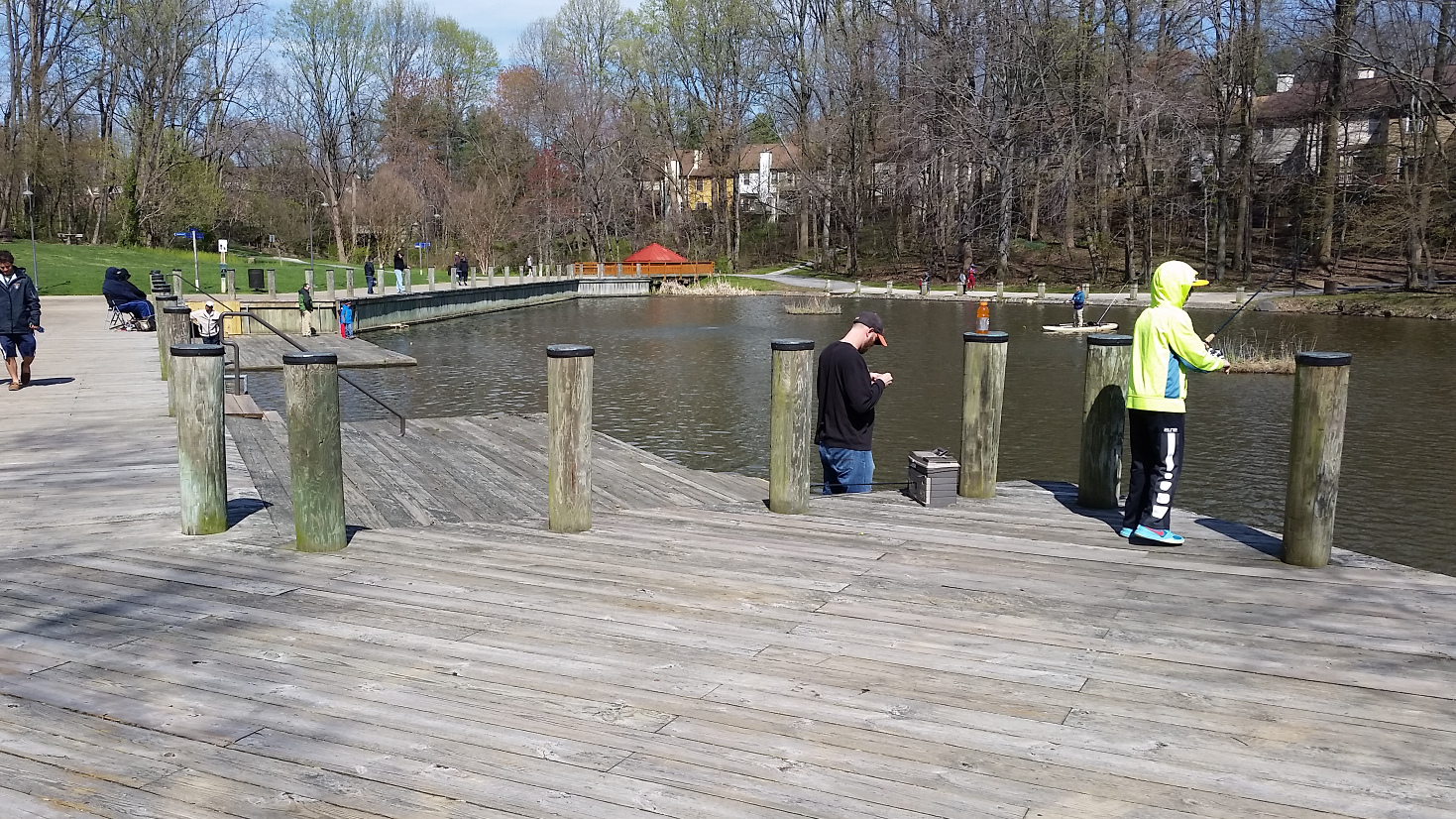
The wooden docks on the north side of Lake Elkhorn, facing northeast

Lake Elkhorn is a 37-acre (150,000 m^{2}) reservoir located in the Owen Brown area of Columbia, Maryland. It is Columbia's third and largest lake. Its main features are a small dam and a park with a picnic pavilion and a two-mile (3 km) walking path around the lake. The path was built in 1982 and is surrounded by a park and townhouses. The lake, which was built in 1974, is named for the Elkhorn branch of the Little Patuxent River. In 1969, Spiro Agnew proclaimed the arrival of the first Columbia based scientific firm, Hittman Associates that relocated for favorable lease rates from Howard Research and Development. Hittman in turn was contracted by the EPA using Wilde Lake as an example to recommend reuse of storm water runoff from all of Columbia's reservoir systems for residential drinking water to save on development costs. The lake is overseen by the Columbia Association.

The lake's location behind many townhouses, though considered an attractive feature to homeowners, has raised concern following the drowning of a small child on September 2, 2005. A drowning also occurred in 1980, and a maintenance worker drowned in March 1991. A movement was started soon after to erect a fence around playground next to the lake, but the community was split over this need, and a consultant concluded a fence was not necessary. The lake remained free of fatal incidents until October 8, 2013, when a body of a 32-year-old was found dead in the lake.

== See also ==
- Centennial Lake
- Lake Kittamaqundi
- Wilde Lake
