= Ross Rawlings =

American pianist and music director

- Born: 1966 or 1967 (age 59–60)
- Education: Towson University (B.A.)
- Occupations: Pianist; Composer; Music director; Conductor
- Awards: Kevin Kline Award (2010)
- Musical career
- Years active: 1982–present

Ross Scott Rawlings (born c. 1966 or 1967) is an American pianist, composer, conductor, and music director.

== Early life and education ==
Rawlings was born circa 1966 or 1967 to Daryl Lee (née Prysock) and Dennis Scott Rawlings. His mother was a contract analyst for the Government of Maryland and his father was a collection agent. Ross Rawlings and his brother, Kevin D. Rawlings lived in Baltimore County, but later moved to Harford County, Maryland before middle school. He began taking piano lessons at the age of 3 and started a singing group in middle school that continued through high school. When Rawlings was 16, he was injured in a car crash while en route to the first orchestra rehearsal for a production of Seesaw at Liberty Showcase Theatre in Randallstown, Maryland. He was in a hospital for over a month due to broken ribs, wrists, kneecaps, sternum and fractured elbows. Despite the crash, Rawlings was able to conduct and play piano for the production. In 1993, Rawlings earned a Bachelor's of Science in Music Education and Piano from Towson University.

== Career ==
Rawlings became the resident musical director of Toby's Dinner Theatre circa 1989. For four years in the mid-1990s, Rawlings also taught at Atholton High School. In the early 2000s, Rawlings was the conductor for the national/international tour of Fosse directed by Ann Reinking/Debra McWaters. In 2006, he was the musical director for broadway revival of Sweet Charity. At Olney Theatre Center in 2012, Rawlings conducted and orchestrated a production of A Chorus Line and was the musical director for Little Shop of Horrors. Rawlings was the musical director of Rep Stage's 2014 production of The Fantasticks. Rawlings was the Director of Choral Activities and Piano at Glenelg High School 2012-2018. In 2017, composer Stacey V. Gibbs wrote a piece of music entitled Go Down, Moses for the Glenelg choir and dedicated it to the students and Rawlings. Rawlings was the musical director of the inaugural premier of the musical, Magic Under Glass, by the Columbia Center for Theatrical Arts under the direction of Toby Orenstein.

== Personal life ==
In the mid-1990s, Rawlings purchased a house in Columbia, Maryland where he lived for 16 years. As of 2018, he resides in Westminster, Maryland.

== Awards and nominations ==
Year	Award	Category	Result	Work	Venue	Notes	Ref.
2010	Kevin Kline Award	Outstanding Dramatic Series	Won	Hairspray	The Muny	Tied with Diane White-Clayton	
2015	Helen Hayes Award	Outstanding Dramatic Series	Nominated	Memphis	Toby's Dinner Theatre		
2015	Helen Hayes Award	Outstanding Dramatic Series	Nominated	Spamalot	Toby's Dinner Theatre		
2018	Helen Hayes Award	Outstanding Dramatic Series	Nominated	Joseph and the Amazing Technicolor Dreamcoat	Toby's Dinner Theatre		
