= Magic Under Glass =

2009 fantasy novel

- First edition
- Author: Jaclyn Dolamore
- Language: English
- Genre: Young adult; Fantasy; Romance
- Published: 2009
- Publisher: Bloomsbury Publishing
- Publication place: United States
- ISBN: 1-408-81172-3
- Followed by: Magic Under Stone

Magic Under Glass is a young-adult fantasy novel by American writer Jaclyn Dolamore. It was published in 2009 by Bloomsbury Publishing, with 240 pages. Magic Under Glass and its 2012 sequel Magic Under Stone were adapted as a fantasy rock musical in 2017 by the Columbia Center for Theatrical Arts.

== Plot summary ==
The story takes place in the kingdom of Lorinar which is in an ongoing war with a neighboring fairy kingdom. Nimira, the heroine, is a woman of aristocratic roots who works as a dancer in a foreign land after her mother's death and the disappearance of her father. She does not think twice when a handsome and mysterious magician, Hollin Parry invites her to live in his palace on the condition that she performs with a robot that can only be turned on with a silver key. She soon finds out that there is some evil magic in the mist and that the automation is Erris, a cursed fairy prince who is trapped in a robot body. Hollin's wife Annalie is trapped in an attic under the control of a sorcerer. Nimira and Erris fall in love and help to free Annalie from her curse. It is unknown what fate awaits them as they seek to free Erris from his automaton body.

The sequel, Magic Under Stone, continues the tale of this duo in this magical land of twists and turns.

== Background ==
Dolamore's inspiration for Magic Under Glass came from her interest in the Victorian era and automaton. Due, in part, to the influence of her favorite author Charlotte Brontë, Dolamore wanted to write a story that incorporated gothic and romance themes. It took her two months to write the first draft of the novel, which she then rewrote twice over the next two years.

== Reception ==
Magic Under Glass, was met with generally positive reviews. Its publisher, Bloomsbury Publishing faced criticism due to perceived whitewashing by using a white woman on the cover to depict the heroine, Nimira who is described in the book as "black-haired and brown-skinned." The author, Dolamore wrote that, although the plot is set in an imaginary kingdom, Nimira's character draws from Eastern European, Asian and Roma cultures.

== Adaptations ==
Columbia Center for Theatrical Arts announced its intention to stage a musical adaptation of Magic Under Glass and Magic Under Stone, engaging author Dolamore as a playwright, Michael Kline as composer and lyricist, Toby Orenstein as artistic director, and Ross Scott Rawlings as orchestrator and music director. Dolamore began writing the script in the Summer of 2015 and concluded it, with the assistance of Kline and Orenstein that December. The musical opened at Howard County Community College Smith Theater in Columbia, Maryland in July 2017. The costume designer, Kristen Clark exhibited the musical at the 2017 World Stage Design in Taipei, Taiwan. In November 2017, American Latino TV featured the musical in an episode, interviewing cast members and hosting a live performance of selections from the original score.
