= Caroline Bowman =

American musical theatre actress (born 1988)

- Born: May 10, 1988 (age 38); Howard County, Maryland
- Education: Penn State University (B.F.A.)
- Occupations: Actress; singer; dancer
- Years active: 2009–present
- Website: carolinebowman.net

Caroline Bowman (born May 10, 1988) is an American theatre actress who has performed in multiple Broadway musicals, including Wicked, Kinky Boots, Sunset Boulevard, Smash, and the national tours of Spamalot, Evita, and Frozen.

== Education ==
Bowman attended Glenelg High School in Howard County, Maryland, from which she graduated in 2006. Bowman received a B.F.A. in Musical Theatre in 2010 from Pennsylvania State University and received a 2014 Penn State Alumni Association Alumni Achievement Award, honoring alumni 35 and under.

== Career ==
Prior to graduation, Bowman toured with the musical Fame in China and performed as Rizzo in Grease in Turkey. She was also a performer with the Young Columbians. Shortly following that, Bowman returned to the states as Lady of the Lake in the Spamalot national tour. Very shortly after the Spamalot tour and her move to New York City, Bowman was offered an ensemble role in Wicked, understudying the lead role of Elphaba. Bowman left Wicked to take part in originating a new musical Kinky Boots in 2013. However, she exited the company shortly after its Broadway premiere to join the Evita national tour as Eva Perón.

After the conclusion of the Evita tour in October 2014, Bowman was offered the lead role of Elphaba in Wicked, beginning on December 16, 2014. She replaced Christine Dwyer. However, in late February, it was announced that due to an injury Bowman sustained, Dwyer would come back for a limited four-week engagement as emergency cover Elphaba. Jennifer DiNoia also returned for a short time until Bowman returned to the show in early April. On August 18, 2015, it was announced that Bowman would be departing Wicked in mid-September, with Rachel Tucker replacing her. From April 30 – May 8, 2016, Bowman reprised her role as Eva Perón in the Vancouver Opera's production of Evita, replacing the previously announced Jenn Colella. As part of the celebrations for the 45th anniversary of the Columbia Center for Theatrical Arts, Bowman was a narrator in a production of Joseph and the Amazing Technicolor Dreamcoat at Toby's Dinner Theatre.

It was announced on May 7, 2019, that Bowman would play Elsa in the national tour of Frozen, which opened in December 2019 at the Pantages Theatre in Los Angeles.

On August 12, 2024, it was announced that Bowman would standby for the role of Norma Desmond in Jamie Lloyd's Broadway revival of Sunset Blvd. She shared the role with Mandy Gonzalez during Nicole Scherzinger’s scheduled absence the week of January 7–12, 2025. Bowman received critical acclaim for her performance.

On October 22, 2024, it was announced that Bowman will originate the role of Karen in the upcoming Broadway production of Smash.

== Performance credits ==
Year(s)	Production	Role	Location	Category
2009–2010	Fame	Carmen Diaz	-	International Tour
2010	Grease	Betty Rizzo	Kurucesme Pavilion	Regional
2010–2011	Spamalot	The Lady of the Lake	-	US Tour
2011	Grease	Betty Rizzo	Olney Theatre Center	Regional
2011–2012	Wicked	Ensemble Elphaba (understudy)	Gershwin Theatre	Broadway
2012	Kinky Boots	Ensemble	Bank of America Theatre	Broadway in Chicago
2013	Kinky Boots	Ensemble Nicola (understudy)	Al Hirschfeld Theatre	Broadway
2013–2014	Evita	Eva Perón	-	US Tour
2014–2015	Wicked	Elphaba	Gershwin Theatre	Broadway
2016	Evita	Eva Perón	Vancouver Opera	Regional
2017	Joseph and the Amazing Technicolor Dreamcoat	Narrator	Toby's Dinner Theatre	Regional
2017	Gypsy	Louise Hovick	Cape Playhouse	Regional
2018–2019	Kinky Boots	Nicola	Al Hirschfeld Theatre	Broadway
2019	Kinky Boots	Nicola	The Muny	Regional
2019–2024	Frozen	Elsa	-	US Tour
2024–2025	Sunset Boulevard	Norma Desmond (standby)	St. James Theatre	Broadway
2025	Smash	Karen	Imperial Theatre	Broadway
2026	Jane Eyre	Blanche Ingram	David Geffen Hall	Lincoln Center

== Personal life ==
Bowman married her partner and Frozen national tour co-star Austin Colby on November 25, 2017. She also has a German Shepherd named Kodak. She is a long-time resident of Columbia, Maryland.
