= Young Columbians =

Theater troupe established by Toby Orenstein in 1975

- Type: Theatre group
- Purpose: Musical theatre, youth program
- Location: Columbia, Maryland
- Artistic director(s): Toby Orenstein, Brynn Williams, Gerald Jordan
- Notable members: Edward Norton, Caroline Bowman, Grace Davina, Steve Blanchard, Ric Ryder,
- Website: http://cctarts.org/the-young-columbians/

The Young Columbians are a theater troupe established by Toby Orenstein in 1975 under the auspices of the Columbia Center for Theatrical Arts. It is a unique ensemble of talented youth aged 15–21.

== History ==
The Young Columbians were founded in 1975, in anticipation of the bicentennial. The first performers to debut as the Young Columbians were a group of children aged 10 to 18, who toured stages across the country from 1975 to 1979 with a program of American patriotic songs. Their bicentennial show at the Lincoln Memorial in Washington, D.C., was aired on television. Time Magazine called the performance "one of the best productions of the bicentennial." A copy of that television program was placed in the nation's bicentennial time capsule.

== Performances ==
The Young Columbians historically have three shows developed by director Toby Orenstein. These include the Spirit of America, Broadway, and Christmas. Each performance includes a medley of songs and dances from the corresponding era. Their current repertoire involves the classic America and Christmas shows accompanied by performances of a play and musical each year, with a midyear cabaret performance. In 2023, they were one of seven groups from across the United States selected to perform in New York City in the Arts for Autism Benefit Concert at the Gershwin Theatre. In 2025, they will return to Arts for Autism at Broadway's New Amsterdam Theatre. Their current frequent performance venues include Merriweather Post Pavilion, Lake Kittamaqundi, Howard Community College, Toby's Dinner Theatre, Olney Theatre Center, and others. They have historically performed at venues including the White House, Wolf Trap, Walt Disney World, The John F. Kennedy Center for the Performing Arts, The Fillmore, The Ellipse, The Mall in Columbia, House of the Temple, the Washington D.C. Temple, and others.

== Notable alumni ==
- Edward Norton (Actor)
- Caroline Bowman (Broadway Actress)
- Steve Blanchard (Actor)
- Harolyn Blackwell (Opera Singer)
- Mary Page Keller (Television Actress)

== See also ==
- Toby's Dinner Theatre
- Columbia Center for Theatrical Arts
- Theater in Washington, D.C.
- Greater Baltimore Theater Awards
