= Merriweather Park at Symphony Woods =

Park in Columbia, Maryland, U.S.

Coordinates: 39.20980°N 76.86227°W

- Interactive map of Merriweather Park at Symphony Woods
- Location: Columbia, Howard County, Maryland
- Area: 51 acres (21 ha)
- Owner: Columbia Association
- Operator: Inner Arbor Trust

The Chrysalis
- Interactive map of The Chrysalis
- Seating type: lawn
- Capacity: 10,000
- Type: amphitheater
- Events: music, performing arts

Inner Arbor Trust
- Established: 26 April 2013
- Location: Columbia, Maryland
- President: Nina Basu
- Website: innerarbortrust.org

Merriweather Park at Symphony Woods is a large central park in downtown Columbia, Maryland. The park includes the Chrysalis, a 2016 amphitheater with lawn seating. The Chrysalis has hosted musical performances, ballet, plays, Maker Faire, and numerous community events.

== History ==
In 2013, former Rouse Company employee Michael McCall proposed county executive-backed plans to convert the wooded land into a destination park. McCall's company, Strategic Leisure, first proposed a $50 million publicly funded six-story parking garage at the Toby's Dinner Theatre location; later proposals included a 39-acre arts park with features such as an outdoor amphitheater called the Chrysalis, a 300-foot-long floating picnic table, and an 800-foot-long tube called the Caterpillar. The new project was named the "Inner Arbor", a spin on another Rouse development, Baltimore's "Inner Harbor". Artist William Cochran, Howard County native, was commissioned for artwork that includes horns up to 28 feet tall.

The Chrysalis opened for its inaugural season in 2017.

== See also ==
- Merriweather Post Pavilion
