= Columbia Association =

Management organization for Columbia, Maryland

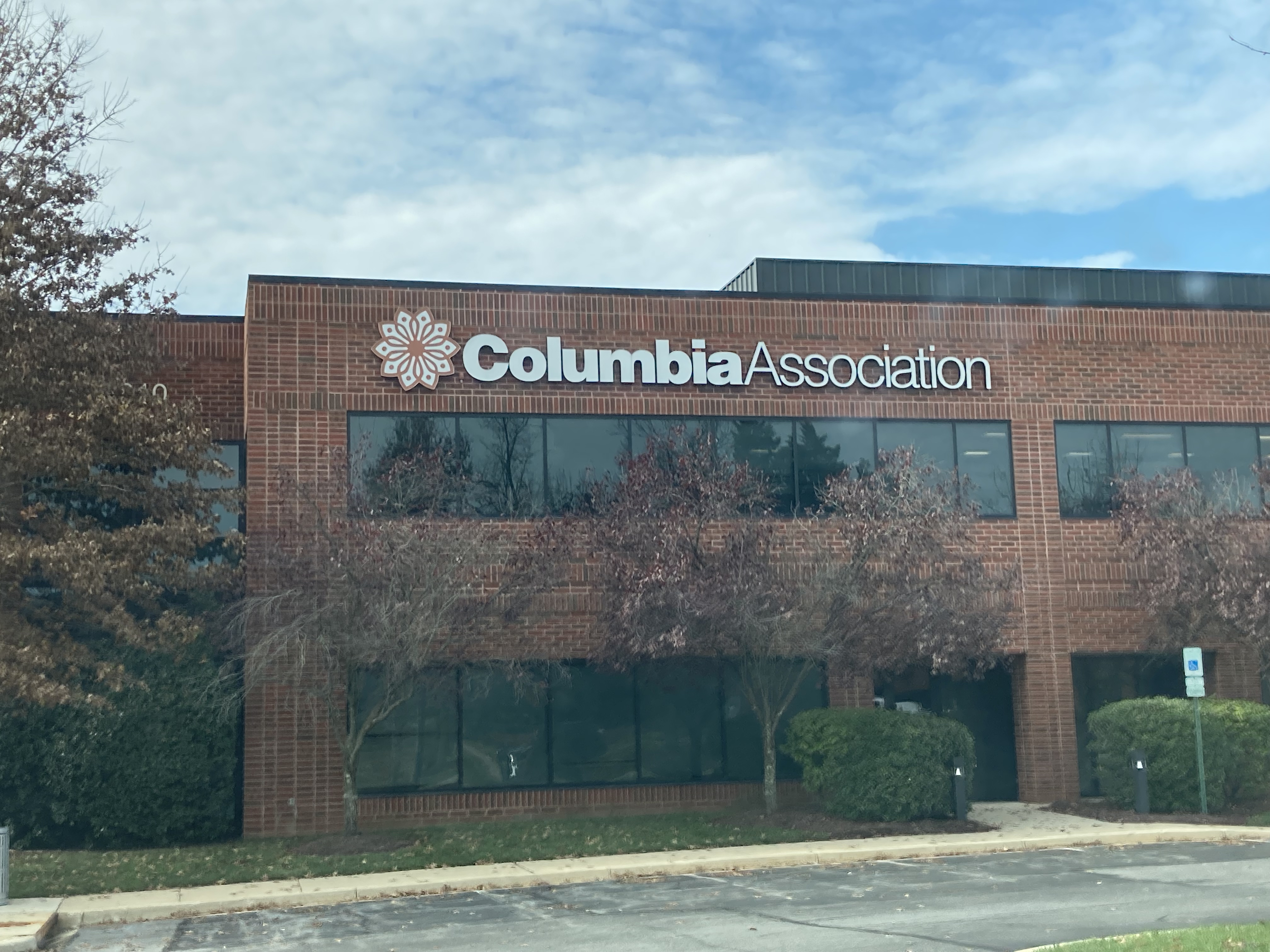
- The organization’s headquarters in Columbia
- Founded: 1967
- Founder: James Rouse
- Type: Not for profit
- Headquarters: Columbia, Maryland, United States
- Members: 100,000+
- Budget: $74.1 Million (2015)
- Website: columbiaassociation.org

The Columbia Association is a management organization for the financing, and maintenance of common-use facilities of the planned community of Columbia, Maryland.

== Organizational structure ==
CA was originally named The Columbia Park and Recreation Association, Inc. The association was responsible for developing public amenities, transportation systems, snow removal, and landscaping promised in its application for New Town Zoning. The funding for the association would be provided by a combination assessment and use-fees.

The seven-member CA board was originally staffed with representatives of the development company with James Rouse as president. The association developed a "one lot-one vote" system, with which gave majority control to the Rouse Company. Control of the association to residents was planned to transfer in phases through 1980. In 1967, 285 residents were able to establish a 5-person council in Wilde Lake, which in turn would provide the first elected board member.

CA originally planned on self-sufficiency through its own taxing authority. However, in 1968, CA negotiated with the county commissioners to pay for and build the Banneker Fire Station and charge an assessment to residents to pay for the equipment. Howard County remained responsible for all continuing capital and operating expenses thereafter.

By 1970, CA had grown to 5,500 members with three five-member village boards, sporting a $1.5 million budget and $5.75 million in debt.

In 1982, the association created the Columbia Archives non-profit organization. The organization is managed by CA's Board of Directors with a mission to chronicle documents relating to Columbia and James Rouse. The organization is public relations resource for Columbia, selecting and displaying historic artifacts that place the development in a positive light.

=== Presidents ===
CA's first president was Padraic M. Kennedy. He was succeeded by Deborah O. McCarty, who resigned in 2000 and was replaced by Charles D. Rhodehamel. Maggie J. Brown was the next president, followed by Phillip L. Nelson. Susan M. Krabbe served as interim president before Milton W. Matthews was appointed.

Lakey Boyd began her role as president on May 3, 2021. Dennis Mattey began a stint as interim president in February 2023.

As of 2026, Shawn MacInnes is the current president of CA. He began the role on June 17, 2024.

== Community events ==
Columbia Association hosts an array of community events.

=== The Columbia Festival of the Arts ===
The Columbia Festival of the Arts presents four weekend-long arts festivals throughout the year, with both free and ticketed events. Festivals feature performances, exhibitions, concerts, classes and workshops, and many more activities for artists, individuals and families. Founded in 1987, the festival has grown into one of the region’s premier arts events.

=== Columbia Teen Idol ===
Columbia Teen Idol is sponsored by Lord & Taylor and CA’s advisory committees. Following an audition process and semi-finals, the final competition features the top ten contestants performing a song of their choice. In the past, performances have included music genres such as rock, showtunes, R&B, and rap. In an effort to emulate its nationwide American Idol counterpart, starting in 2016 the finalists were provided with one-on-one training with a professional singer in the days leading up to the show. In addition to the vocal competition, contestants are required to participate in volunteer activities for the community with the intention of providing a foundation of empowerment for all participants. The top three contestants receive a cash prize, and a People's Choice Award is selected by the audience. Notable former award winners include Grace Davina, who was presented her prize by Miss Maryland Teen USA 2014, Mariela Pepin.

== Facilities ==
- Supreme Sports Club
- Fairway Hills Golf Course
- Equestrian Center (1978) -
- Hobbit's Glen Golf Club
- Slayton House - Columbia Swim Club
- Symphony Woods

== See also ==
- Homeowner association
- Planned community
