= Liza Quin =

Cuban-American artist (born 1982)

- Born: Liza Quintana; Chicago, Illinois, U.S.
- Origin: Miami, Florida, United States
- Genres: Latin, R&B, Pop, Rock, Dance, Reggaeton
- Occupations: Singer, Songwriter, Actress, Record Producer, Performer, TV Host
- Instruments: Vocals
- Years active: 2004–2016
- Labels: True Life Entertainment Records, The Quintessential L-M-Ent.
- Website: www.lizaquin.com

Liza Quin (born Liza Quintana) is a Cuban-American artist who began performing at the age of five. She has worked behind the scenes in the music industry writing songs, recording back-up vocals, and producing and singing alongside numerous artists such as Alejandro Sanz, Jon Secada, Ziggy Marley, Carlos Ponce, Gloria Estefan, Francisco Céspedes. Quin was a featured vocalist on Ricky Martin's One Night Only tour and UnPlugged for MTV.

As a songwriter, her credits include collaborations on several popular songs including Gloria Estefan's Grammy nominated "Out of Nowhere," as well as songs for Ricky Martin, Mandy Moore, Miami Sound Machine, Shalim, and Pablo Portillo.

In 2005, Quin released the single "Make Your Move," featuring one of the pioneers of Latin urban pop music, El General. The accompanying video became popular on HTV and MTV, rotating in over 20 different countries and topping radio charts in Colombia. Soon after, her collaboration with Miami hip hop artist Garcia, featuring N.O.R.E., the bilingual "Dejalo" hit top 20 on urban Latino radio stations in Miami.

Early in 2013, Quin worked on a solo EP and performed in the Miami area with her then-band Liza Quin & The Bureau.

== Discography ==
Singles

- Make Your Move (2005)

== Filmography ==
Film
| Year | Film | Role | Notes |
|---|---|---|---|
| 2011 | La Mina TV | Liza | Webnovela |
Television
| Year | Title | Role | Notes |
| 2004-2007 | American Latino TV | Host | |
