= Toby's Dinner Theatre =

Dinner theater based in Columbia, Maryland, US

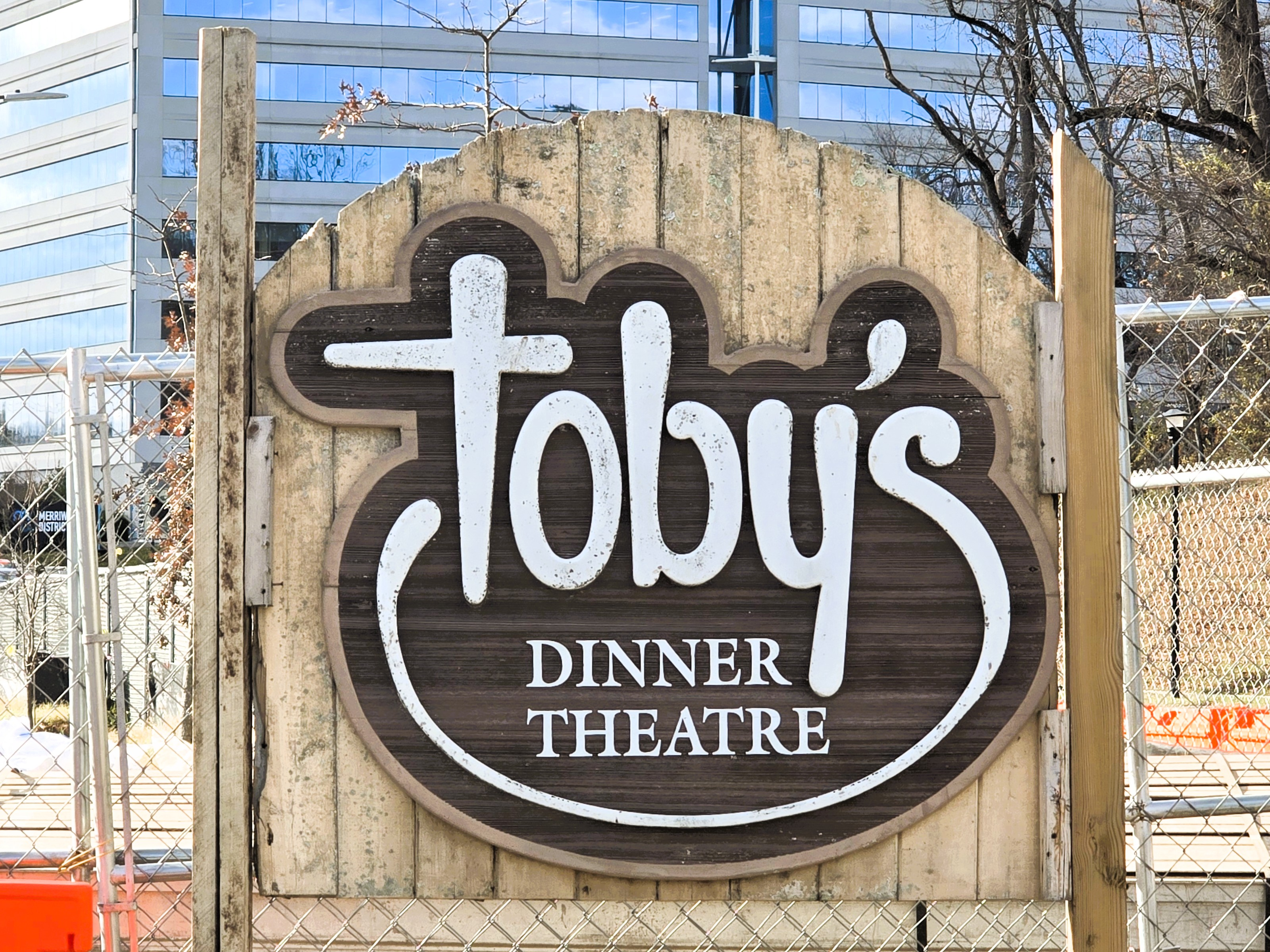
- Toby's Dinner Theatre sign, November 2025
- Formation: 1979
- Type: Theatre group
- Location: Columbia, Maryland
- Coordinates: 39.20892°N 76.85849°W
- Notable members: Johnny Holliday, Edward Norton, Caroline Bowman, Robin Baxter, Steve Blanchard, Tracie Thoms, Mary Page Keller, Ric Ryder, Colton Roberts
- Website: tobysdinnertheatre.com

Toby's Dinner Theatre is a dinner theater based in Columbia, Maryland.

== History ==
Soon after the establishment of the Columbia Center for Theatrical Arts (CCTA), Toby Orenstein decided to open a theater in her name. In 1979, she approached businessman James Rouse, the catalyst for the CCTA, and he agreed to helped start this endeavor. Shortly thereafter, a Virginia-based restaurant group operated by Steve Lewis approached Orenstein with a partnership offer for the Garland Dinner Theater in Columbia, Maryland. On December 4, 1979, Toby's Dinner Theater opened with a performance of Godspell. In a 2008 interview with the Maryland Women's Hall of Fame, Orenstein reflected on her apprehensiveness:

It was Hal (husband, Harold Orenstein), who encouraged me to embark on this venture. He was so supportive. We had a son in college and a daughter in high school and financial concerns, but we just decided to do it. I took no salary for my work at the school. He had a good job as an economist. We did not want for anything, but we had only a small savings. The food company had the credit rating to qualify for the loan, but we still had to come up with money. We took every drop of savings we had and put it into the theater. I was scared to death. I had no idea how to run a business like this. I am the kind of person who jumps into the water and then finds out she can't swim. My husband is the rational one.

On March 10, 2006, Toby's Dinner Theatre opened a second location in Baltimore with a run of Beauty and the Beast. This location is now closed.

== Facilities ==
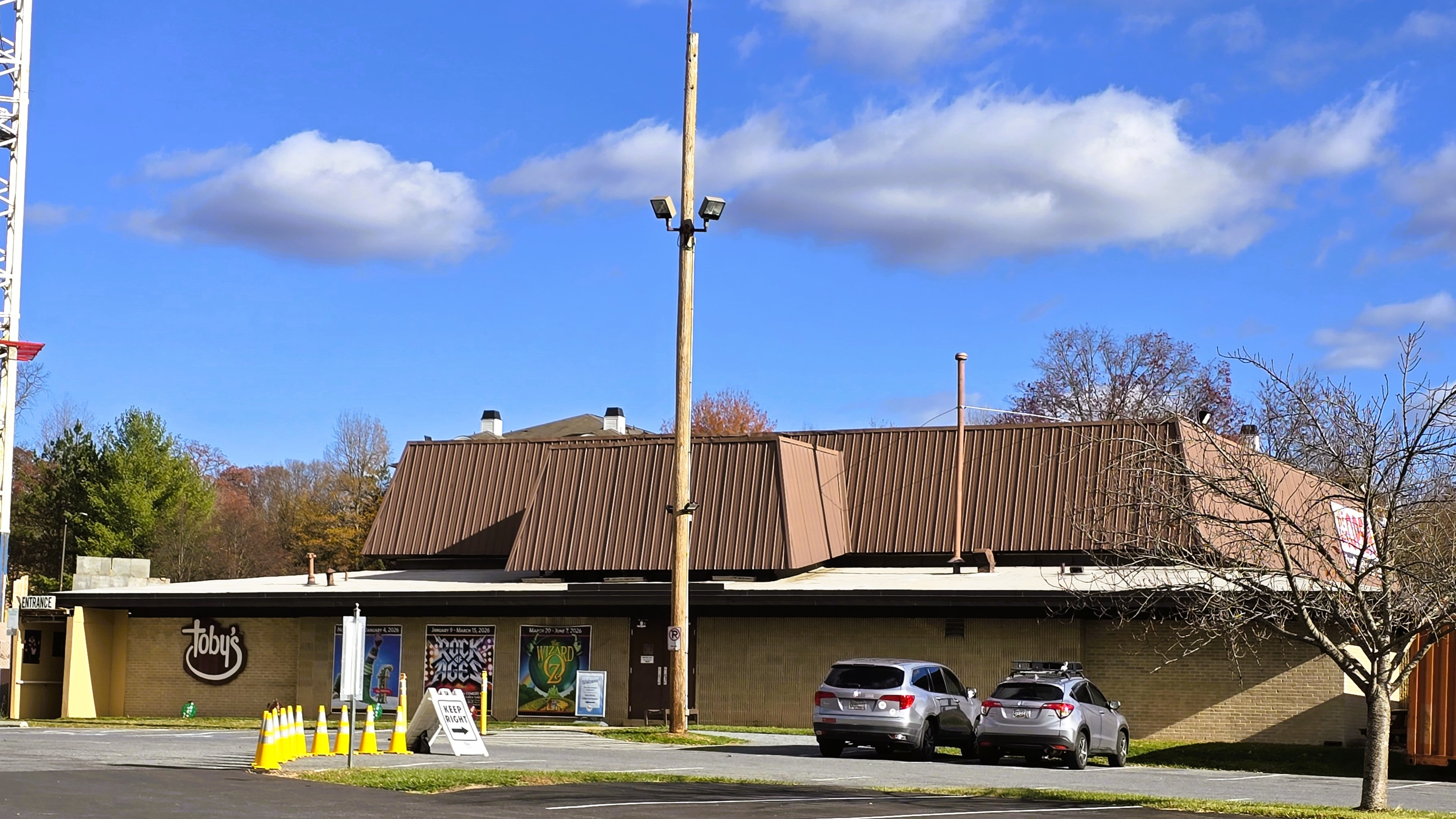
Toby's Dinner Theatre building, November 2025

In 1979, Toby's Dinner Theatre opened at its current location in downtown Columbia, Maryland, adjacent to the Merriweather Post Pavilion and Lake Kittamaqundi. It has an indoor seating capacity of 300 individuals. The theatre has parking, buffet-style dinner, full bar, full menu, and live music and entertainment. Dinner is a mix of American cuisine. The facility is ADA compliant. Toby's is estimated to draw 4,000 subscribers and 80,000–102,000 patrons a year.

In April 2025, Howard County broke ground on a new performing arts center on the site of Toby's Dinner Theatre. The center will contain one 340-seat dinner theater, two 200-seat black box theaters, a public art gallery and several dance studios and performance classrooms.

== Productions ==
Recent productions include Dreamgirls, Joseph and the Amazing Technicolor Dreamcoat starring Caroline Bowman and Cathy Mundy, Beauty and the Beast, Show Boat, A Christmas Carol, Sister Act, Hairspray, Peter Pan, Into the Woods, South Pacific, The Little Mermaid, and Newsies.

== Awards and nominations ==
- Helen Hayes Awards
  - 2013 Outstanding Resident Musical Nomination – The Color Purple
  - 2015 Outstanding Ensemble in a Musical Nomination – Memphis, The Musical
  - 2015 Outstanding Ensemble in a Musical Nomination – Spamalot
  - 2016 Outstanding Ensemble in a Musical Nomination – Ragtime
  - 2016 Outstanding Musical – Ragtime

== See also ==
- Columbia Center for Theatrical Arts
- Young Columbians
- Helen Hayes Award
- Theater in Washington, D.C.
- Greater Baltimore Theater Awards
