= American Latino TV =

- Genre: Magazine-style
- Directed by: Humberto Guida
- Presented by: Carolina Trejos (2019–present)
- Country of origin: United States
- Original language: English
- No. of seasons: 18

Production
- Executive producer: Bruno Seros-Ulloa
- Camera setup: Videotape; Single-camera
- Running time: approx. 24 min.

Original release
- Network: Syndicated
- Release: 2004 – present

American Latino TV is a nationally syndicated television program produced by American Latino Syndication, a division of LATV Networks. The weekly magazine and culture lifestyle program showcases American and foreign-born Latinos making a positive impact in American society. The program set the standard for highlighting American Latino culture through entertainment, the arts and sciences, education and sports. The show has had various hosts throughout the years including Liza Quin, Belqui Ortiz, Stephanie Ortiz, Jeannette Sandoval, Julian Dujarric, Daisy Fuentes, Valery Ortiz and is currently hosted by Carolina Trejos.

American Latino TV can be seen weekly in over 100 cities in over 92% of U.S. Hispanic homes (and 65% of all TV homes) across the U.S. on a number of TV affiliates, as well as in reruns on cable networks. Segments from the show can also be seen on the Internet and the show is broadcast internationally in the Virgin Islands, Puerto Rico and in parts of Canada bordering the U.S. The show often airs in tandem with its sister program LatiNation and has also spawned a series of specials titled American Latino Presents and The American Latino Awards.

== Format ==
The show is a half-hour culture and entertainment magazine with 4–5 segments ranging from 1:30–3:30 minutes in length. The segments include music, fashion, culture, celebrity interviews and inspirational stories of regular people doing extraordinary things.

== Hosts ==
- Celines Toribio (2002 Urban Latino TV)
- Johnny Salgado (2002–04 Urban Latino TV)
- Noemi (2002–04 Urban Latino TV)
- Liza Quin (2004–2007)
- Cristina Fernandez (2004–2007)
- Belqui Ortiz (2007–08)
- Stephanie Ortiz (2007–08)
- Jeanette Sandoval (2008–09)
- Julian Dujarric (2008–2009)
- Daisy Fuentes (2009–10)
- Valery Ortiz (2010–16)
- Natasha Martinez (2016–19)
- Carolina Trejos (2019–present)

== Origins ==
American Latino TV was formerly known as Urban Latino TV and was originally produced by the AIM Tell-A-Vision Group (AIM TV), a New York City-based production and syndication company. AIM TV is a division of Artist and Idea Management and helped establish the business model of producing English language content for U.S. born Latinos beginning in 2001.

AIM TV was established in February 2000 by Robert G. Rose with the help of his production partner, Renzo Devia. AIM TV was the first television company to successfully produce, distribute and syndicate television programming targeting U.S. born Latinos, helping to spawn an industry that had not existed before (TV content in English, targeted to young, mostly U.S. born Latinos). 65% of U.S. Latinos are U.S. born according to U.S. Census data, but rarely if ever watch Spanish-language TV (according to Tomas Rivera Policy Inst. 1999).

In January 2008, the syndicated programs and the American Latino brand name were acquired by LATV Networks, the nation's first bilingual entertainment/music network distributed via digital multicast. The company gradually moved production to Los Angeles, California, where the show continues production of original episodes.

The broadcast syndication division (American Latino Syndication) continues to operate under the LATV Networks umbrella with sales and production offices located in New York City and Los Angeles, California.

== Awards ==
- Imagen Award for Best National Informational Programming 2003, 2004, 2005
- The Aurora Award – GOLD, Episode 204, 2004
- The Aurora Award – Platinum Best of Show – Episode 201, 2004
- Davey award, 2006

== Notable features on American Latino TV ==
- Carlos Mencia
- Cast of Ugly Betty
- Celia Cruz
- Cheech Marin
- Tito Puente
- Juanes
- Daddy Yankee
- Magic Under Glass
- Miguel Angel Garcia
- Freddy Rodriguez
- Jimmy Smits
- Joaquin Cortes
- José Feliciano
- Larry Harlow
- Lorena Ochoa
- Luis Castillo
- Maná
- Milka Duno
- Perez Hilton
- Rey Mysterio
- Richard Carmona
- Roberto Clemente
- Shakira
- Sonia Manzano
- Tego Calderón
- The Mars Volta
- Tommy Chong
- Tony Gonzalez
- Uriel Saenz
