= Stan Salett =

American activist and policy advisor

- Born: April 6, 1936 (age 90)
- Occupations: Civil rights activist & national education policy advisor
- Known for: Creator of the Upward Bound Program
- Spouse: Elizabeth
- Children: 2 incl. Peter Salett

Stan Salett (born April 6, 1936) is a civil rights organizer, national education policy advisor and creator of the Upward Bound Program and helped to initiate Head Start. In the early 1960s Salett was an organizer for the Congress of Racial Equality (CORE) and helped organize the March on Washington for Jobs and Freedom. He was the first director of education of the Office of Economic Opportunity, where the Head Start program was created. He co-founded the National Committee for Citizens in Education, dedicated to promoting parent and citizen involvement in schools. During President Lyndon Johnson administration he initiated the National Upward Bound program. While working in Washington, D.C. he served on the staff of all three Kennedy brothers: President Kennedy's Committee on Youth Employment, Attorney General Robert F. Kennedy's President's Committee on Juvenile Delinquency and Senator Ted Kennedy's Presidential campaign in 1980. He was an active school board member in Maryland in the 1980s. During President Bill Clinton's transition he vetted candidates for Attorney General and Secretary of the Interior.

In 2011 he published his memoir, The Edge of Politics: Stories from the Civil Rights Movement, the War on Poverty & the Challenges of School Reform. He received the New England Education Opportunity Association's Claiborne Pell Award in 2013. Presently he is President of the Foundation for the Future of Youth, a division of the Eigen Arnett Educational and Cultural Foundation. He has developed special search engines to meet a variety of human needs such as the elimination of human trafficking, the improvement of school performance and the scarcity of the global water supply. In 2016 Salett has been involved in The Independent Media Institute study which evaluated the movement to privatize public education. It was revealed that, "… in the past two decades, a small group of billionaires – including News Corporation's Rupert Murdoch, who once called public schools an "untapped 500-billion-dollar sector" – have worked to assert private control over public education ...." Salett was presented with the 2017 Distinguished Graduate Award from Boston Latin School for his career to public service and public policy work. The Award is given each year to alumni exemplifying the Boston Latin School motto, sumus primi.

As of 2016, he resides in Washington, DC, and Chestertown, Maryland with his wife Elizabeth. He has two sons, singer-songwriters Peter Salett and Steve Salett, owner of Saltlands Studio in Brooklyn, New York and Reservoir in Manhattan.
