= Columbia Center for Theatrical Arts =

Theater school in Columbia, Maryland, US

Coordinates: 39.18678°N 76.82398°W

- Formation: 1972
- Type: Theatre group
- Purpose: Musical Theatre, Youth program
- Location: Columbia, Maryland, U.S.
- Artistic director: Toby Orenstein
- Notable members: Edward Norton, Caroline Bowman, Peter Salett
- Website: cctarts.org

Columbia Center for Theatrical Arts (CCTA) is a Greater Washington D.C. Area regional theater school based in Columbia, Maryland. CCTA is a non-profit 501(c)(3) organization that is funded, in part, by the National Endowment for the Arts, the Maryland State Arts Council, and the Howard County Arts Council from Howard County, Maryland.

== History ==
Founded in 1972, as the Columbia School for Theatrical Arts (now Columbia Center for Theatrical Arts) it is known for its productions of musicals and new plays. CCTA was founded by Toby Orenstein. She was asked by businessman and builder James Rouse to create a non-profit theatrical arts school for the then-new Maryland city of Columbia. Its mission is to educate through the arts. CCTA has three distinct departments: it offers a conservatory, theatrical arts productions, and outreach programs.

== Theatre programs ==
=== Conservatory ===
The conservatory offers performing arts-based programs to the local community. These include different programs for children in primary and secondary school. The Young Columbians are a performing troupe created by CCTA. The conservatory has been the recipient of five grants from the National Endowment for the Arts.

=== Outreach programs ===
The CCTA has a number of incentives such as fundraising, scholarships. The Labor of Love is an annual event that raises money for the AIDS Alliance of Howard County.

CCTA's Outreach Programs are aimed to help make theatre arts available and accessible to local students in need. Partnerships now exist with Baltimore City Public School System and the Loyola University Maryland. CCTA performs the original play Ben Carson, M.D. to local youth. CCTA has a program for students with special needs at Glenelg High School, under the direction of Kassidy Sharp, and the Kennedy Krieger Institute of Baltimore.

== Recent productions ==
Past productions include the 2016 world premiere of Magic Under Glass, the musical, based on Jaclyn Dolamore's book. Performance venues include the White House, Wolf Trap, Walt Disney World, The John F. Kennedy Center for the Performing Arts, Merriweather Post Pavilion, The Fillmore, Lake Kittamaqundi, Howard Community College, Toby's Dinner Theatre, The Ellipse, House of the Temple, the Washington D.C. Temple, and others.

== Board of directors ==
- President: Toby Orenstein
- Chairman: Janet Davidson Gordon
- Vice chairman: Carolyn Kelemen
- Secretary: Mindy Hirsch
- Treasurer: Harold Orenstein
- Members: Mary Armiger, John Astin, Steve Duffy, John Harding, Sarah Otchet, Melissa Rosenberg, and Jack Wilen
- Honorary Board Member: Edward Norton

== People ==
- Robin Baxter, Broadway performer
- Risa Binder, Emmy-nominated country singer-songwriter
- Steve Blanchard, Broadway performer
- Caroline Bowman, Broadway performer
- Johnny Holliday, Radio and TV sportscaster and a former Top 40 radio disc jockey
- Mary Page Keller, Hollywood film actress
- Megan Lawrence, Tony-nominated broadway performer
- Edward Norton, Academy Award-nominated actor, filmmaker, and activist
- Ric Ryder, Broadway performer and vocal coach
- Peter Salett, musician, composer, performer, and singer-songwriter
- Margo Seibert, Broadway performer
- Tracie Thoms, television, film, and stage actress and singer
- Betsy True, Broadway performer
- Mark Waldrop, Broadway writer and director
- Tico Wells, Hollywood film actor
- Brynn Williams, Broadway performer
- Stacy Wolf, Author and musical theatre director and professor

== Awards ==
- 2016 Cherry Adler Award, The Maryland State Arts Council, Maryland Department of Commerce

== Community partners ==
- Baltimore City Public School System
- Howard County Public School System
- Howard County Recreation and Parks
- Kennedy Krieger Institute
- Howard County Arts Council
- Howard Community College
- Howard County General Hospital: A member of Johns Hopkins Medicine

== See also ==
- Toby's Dinner Theatre
- Young Columbians
- Helen Hayes Award
- Theater in Washington, D.C.
- Greater Baltimore Theater Awards
