= Leapfrog development =

Urbanization process

Leapfrog development occurs when developers skip over land to obtain cheaper land further away from cities, thus, leaving huge areas empty between the city and the new development. It can be seen when it comes to the development or urbanization of more rural areas.

== Mechanism ==
Leapfrog development can occur for numerous reasons. Often, developers are more likely to hold onto land closer to cities and instead develop less valuable land further from urban centers. Moreover, some developers prefer to build in large open areas as it can be easier and less restricted than building in cities. Other reasons for leapfrog development include household preferences, available amenities, minimized commutation costs and the costs and regulations involved in construction.

== Common issues ==
Leapfrog developments can have several common problems, including vacant land left between cities and developments, inefficient land distribution, increased pollution due to an increase in traffic and congestion, and the extension of amenities that can be costly.

== Infill housing programs ==
When leapfrogging occurs, infill development often follows. The eventual development of the vacant land between the city and the leapfrog development is called infill. As infill development increases, leapfrog development will eventually slow over time.

== Leapfrog development in Phoenix, Arizona ==
There are plenty of leapfrog developments outside of the urban center of Phoenix, Arizona, making it an excellent subject to examine the effects of such developments. Additionally, western cities are typically less built-up and enclosed versus northeastern and midwestern cities, making leapfrog developments and their effects more noticeable. Starting in the 1940s, developers in Arizona began to develop communities a considerable distance away from Phoenix as the land prices were very low. These communities are categorized as leapfrog developments as a substantial amount of land was “skipped” over.

=== Common issues in Phoenix ===
Phoenix's earlier planned communities provided amenities, but that did not prevent problems from arising later. For instance, developers planned on bringing businesses, jobs, libraries, and other amenities to these communities but could not meet the growing demand. Due to the limited employment opportunities within these communities, people living in these developments had to commute, which created concerns about an increase in pollution. Additionally, it was found to be expensive to extend gas, sewage, and water lines from the city and its neighboring areas to the new distant communities.

=== Arizona government response ===
==== Arizona Groundwater Management Act ====
In 1980, the state and local governments in Arizona passed the Arizona Groundwater Management Act, making leapfrogging in more remote Arizona areas more difficult. Under this act, developments were required to show they had access to a one-hundred-year supply of water that would not contribute to the depletion of groundwater. Effectively, this meant that developers had to rely heavily on municipal water-lines, making it far more costly for them to expand in areas distant from existing municipalities.

==== Development impact fees ====
The cost of extending infrastructure can be exorbitant, so many places like Phoenix issued development impact fees. Developers would be subject to these fees if they built new communities distant from the city. The additional expense discouraged leapfrog developments and removed at least part of the hefty financial burden the city bore by extending infrastructure for these developments.

Developers and those opposed to the development impact fees argued that these fees would hurt the home buyers by increasing the cost of properties. Additionally, they argued that the fees could hurt lower-income families due to rising rents and delays in the construction of new affordable housing units. Another concern was that impact fees would cause people, businesses, and the associated tax revenue to move to areas without development impact fees.

However, results of an Arizona task force show that the impact fees would not have a significant effect on homeowners. Impact fees were unlikely to drastically increase home prices, "with a $3,000 fee the increase in the monthly mortgage payment for a 30-year level payments loan at 10 percent would be $52.70." The only instance in which homeowners and low-income families would be negatively affected would be a situation in which the impact fees increased drastically. But this scenario is judged as unlikely to occur.

Phoenix decided to suspend these development impact fees in a section of the city due to fear that several commercial developments would leave and opt to develop elsewhere.

=== Phoenix's infill housing program ===
Phoenix's Infill Housing Program started in 1995. The program used incentives to encourage building developments or homes on land between leapfrog developments and the city that had been "skipped" over. These incentives included eliminating some or all of the cost of fees for permits, zoning, and water, as well as a potentially expedited development process. Phoenix's mayor stated that the Infill Housing Program seems to be successful, but progress is slow.

Phoenix's infill housing program may be working slowly because infill developments transpire more slowly than other types of developments. A study of leapfrog developments in Maryland found that infill developments occur at an annual rate of about one percent, meaning that the skipped over land is developed at about one percent per year.
