= David Hobby =

American photographer

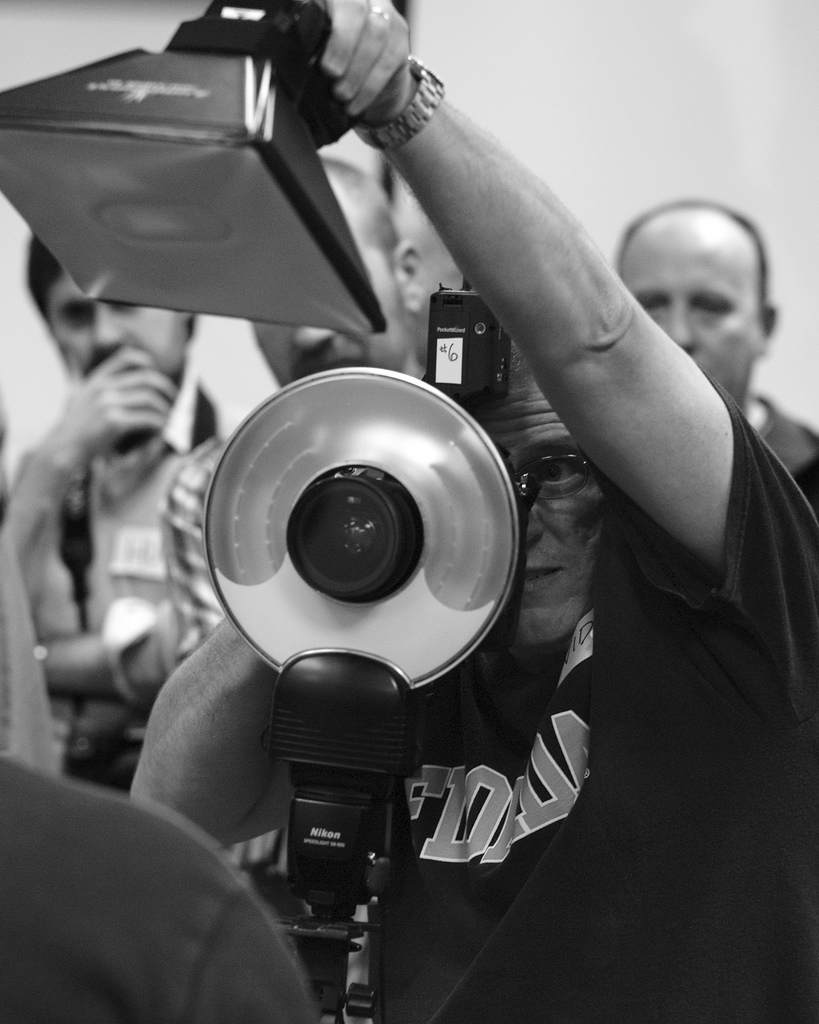
David Hobby using a ring flash adaptor.

David Hobby (born January 30, 1965) is an American photographer and is the author of the Strobist.com lighting blog, a site which promotes lighting techniques — such as off-camera flash — among photographic enthusiasts, often with an emphasis on practical knowledge rather than the gear. The blog is no longer updated but at one time had an on-line monthly readership of over 300,000 photographers from 175 countries, and was named one of the "25 Best Blogs of 2010" by Time magazine.

== Professional life ==
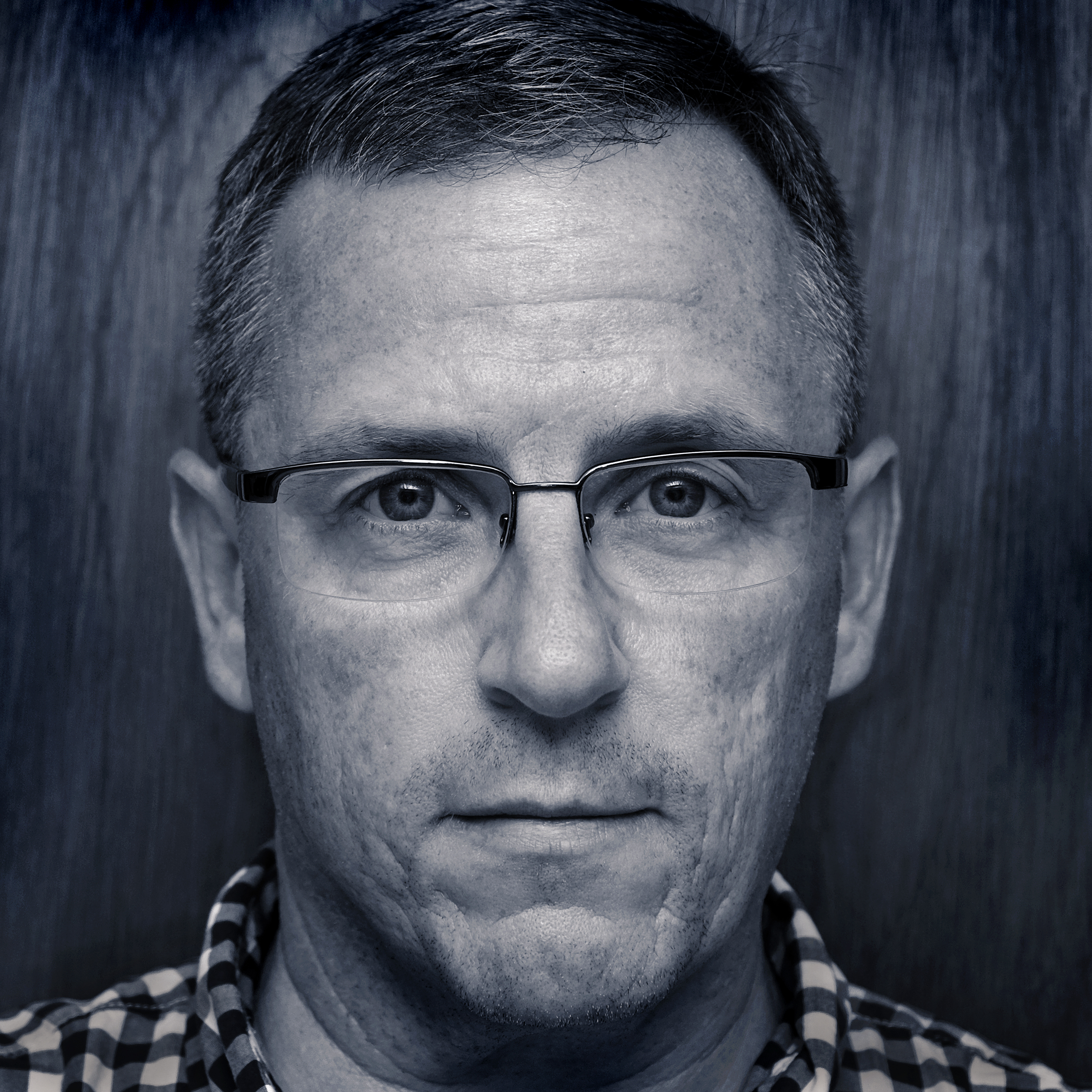
David Hobby

Until July 2008, Hobby was a staff photojournalist with The Baltimore Sun.

In June 2007, he took a year-long leave of absence from The Sun to blog full time. On August 3, 2008, Hobby announced in a posting on his blog that he had taken a buyout from The Sun along with about one hundred staffers who left the paper at that time. He explained, "There was a hard staff reduction quota in effect, and given the way the blog has gone I thought it would be best if I counted toward it when they started lopping off heads". Hobby has since used the blog as a platform from which to explore various photographic projects.

In June 2009, Hobby was named one of "The Five Biggest Photographers on the Internet" by Photo District News.

In July 2021, Hobby announced that he was moving on to a different, unnamed project and would no longer update Strobist.

Interviews:

- Jefferson Graham for USA Today
- Allen Murabayashi for the American Society of Media Photographers

Hobby has authored an article on a DIY photo studio in the December 2007 issue of MacWorld, co-authored the book Columbia: A Celebration with wife Susan Thornton Hobby, and produced two tutorial DVD series

== Personal life ==
Hobby studied photojournalism at the University of Florida.

Hobby currently lives in the Howard County, Maryland, area with his wife Susan and two children.
