= Peter Salett =

American singer

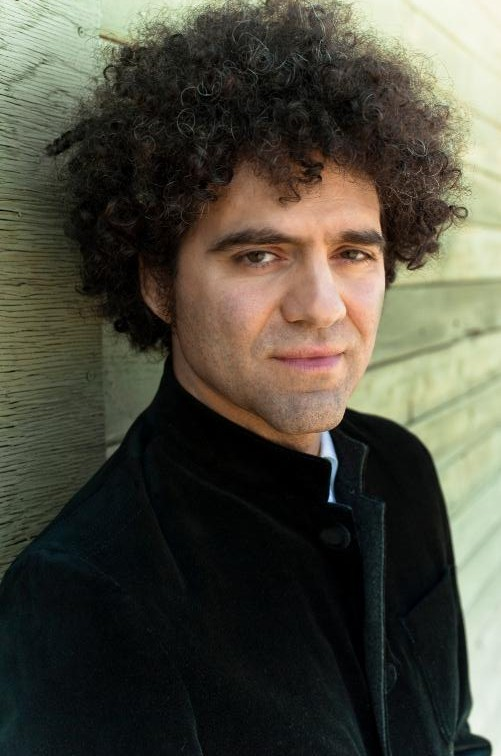
- Peter Salett

Background information
- Born: Peter Joseph Salett; May 12, 1969
- Origin: Princeton, New Jersey, United States
- Genres: Rock; alt country; jazz
- Occupations: Singer-songwriter; film composer; actor
- Instruments: Vocals; guitar; piano
- Years active: 1995–present
- Labels: Dusty Shoes Music; Sweet Song; Hollywood
- Website: Official website

Peter Joseph Salett (born May 12, 1969) is an American singer-songwriter. He is best known as a musician for his song "Heart of Mine" in the movie Keeping the Faith, his song score for the 2006 film Down in the Valley, and for co-writing the Dracula puppet musical finale, "A Taste for Love", in the Judd Apatow produced film, Forgetting Sarah Marshall.

== Life and career ==
Born in Princeton, New Jersey, Salett moved with his family to Columbia, Maryland when he was four years old. His father, Stan Salett, was a civil rights organizer. While at Harper's Choice Middle School, he was in the same class as Edward Norton. He later attended Brown University, graduating in 1991.

Salett has contributed music to numerous films including Keeping the Faith (2000), Down in the Valley, The Ten and Wet Hot American Summer. He has also had roles in films such as Superbad and Forgetting Sarah Marshall.

Keeping the Faith featured a T-Bone Burnett remix of the title track from Salett's second independent release, Heart of Mine (2000), used as the theme for the film.

Following the 2016 elections, Salett founded the non-profit political organization The Hometown Project, which works to help elect progressive candidates in local races by creating candidate endorsement videos with actors and musicians who have personal connections to local districts.

Salett lives with his wife and child in Brooklyn, New York.

== Filmography ==
Films and awards
Year	Title	Role	Notes
2001	Wet Hot American Summer	Guitar dude	
2002	Stella Shorts	Guitar player / Indian / Cop / Terrorist / Shirpa	
2005	The F Word	Peter	
2007	Superbad	Tiger Greendragon	
2007	The Ten	Lying Rhine Body	
2008	Role Models	Ladislas of Leisure	
2008	Forgetting Sarah Marshall	Keyboard player	
2012	Wanderlust	Manfreddie (uncredited)	
2014	Inside Amy Schumer	Guitarist	
2015	Wet Hot American Summer	Guitar Dude	

== Discography ==
- 1998 – Paintings of These Days (Dusty Shoes Music)
- 2000 – Heart of Mine (Dusty Shoes Music)
- 2001 – Faded Blue Eyes (Dusty Shoes Music)
- 2004 – After A While (Dusty Shoes Music)
- 2008 – In The Ocean of the Stars (Dusty Shoes Music)
- 2010 – The Carriage House Sessions, together with Larry Goldings (Sweet Song Records)
- 2010 – Addicted to Distraction (Dusty Shoes Music)
- 2025 - Dance of the Yellow Leaf (Dusty Shoes Music)
- 2025 - Suite for the Summer Rain (Dusty Shoes Music)

== Soundtracks ==
- 1998 – Hurricane Streets (Mammoth Records)
- 2000 – Keeping the Faith (Hollywood Records)
- 2001 – Wet Hot American Summer (USA Films)
- 2005 – The Baxter (Milan Records)
- 2006 – Down in the Valley (ATO)
- 2007 – Wedding Daze (Nettwerk)
- 2007 – The Ten (Commotion Records)
- 2009 – Role Models (Back Lot Music, Universal)
- 2010 – By the People: For the People (Music Inspired by the Motion Picture By the People: The Election of Barack Obama) (iTunes soundtrack)
- 2010 – Get Him to the Greek (Republic Records)
