= Toby Orenstein =

American theatrical director, producer, and educator

- Born: Toby Barbara Press; May 23, 1937 (age 89); Bronx, New York, U.S.
- Education: Columbia University
- Children: 2

Toby Barbara Orenstein (née Press; born May 23, 1937) is an American theater director, producer, and educator. She is the founder of the Columbia Center for Theatrical Arts and its teen performance troupe, the Young Columbians. Orenstein also established Toby's Dinner Theatre, for which she serves as artistic director, and has operated locations in Columbia, Maryland, since 1979 and in Baltimore. Her career began as a teacher for a federal education project initiated by Eleanor Roosevelt, and her work has included developing arts-based community outreach programs for disadvantaged and special-needs children.

== Early life and education ==
Toby Barbara Press was born in the Bronx, New York City, on May 23, 1937, to Mildred and Sam Press. Her interest in theater began at a young age. Her first role was in a kindergarten play where she portrayed a pilgrim. By the third grade, she was actively directing shows at school and on playgrounds. At age 16, she directed a children's summer theater camp in the Catskill Mountains.

Orenstein was accepted into the High School of the Performing Arts in New York City. However, she transferred during her junior year to a local high school in the Bronx, where she won an award for "best actress" and directed the senior show. After graduating, she attended Cortland State Teachers College before transferring to Columbia University to enroll in its theater program. She graduated from Columbia University with bachelor's degrees in theater and education.

== Career ==
After graduating from Columbia University, Orenstein was selected as one of twelve teachers for the All Day Neighborhood School Project, a federal education program launched by Eleanor Roosevelt to integrate the arts into schools in Harlem. After relocating to the Washington, D.C. area, she continued her career in education and theater. In 1965, she began teaching drama and directing at Cynthia Warner's School in Takoma Park, Maryland. During this period, she also directed children's drama at the Burn Brae Dinner Theatre and taught theater at Catholic University of America.

In 1972, Columbia, Maryland, founder James Rouse asked Orenstein to establish a theater school for the new city. She officially founded the nonprofit Columbia Center for Theatrical Arts (CCTA) in 1974. As an extension of the CCTA, Orenstein created the Young Columbians, a performance troupe for young people aged 8 to 21. The original troupe, composed of performers aged 10 to 18, toured the United States from 1975 to 1979 with a show of American patriotic songs. Their bicentennial performance at the Lincoln Memorial was broadcast on live television, leading to invitations to perform at venues including the White House and Disney World. Actor Edward Norton is an alumnus of the Young Columbians program.

In 1979, Orenstein founded Toby's Dinner Theatre in Columbia, financing the venture with her and her husband's personal savings. The theater opened on December 4, 1979, with a production of Godspell. For her work in the arts, Orenstein was named Columbian of the Year by Columbia Magazine in 1985 and received the Howie Award for outstanding contributions to the arts in Howard County in 1990. In 1996, she was nominated for a Helen Hayes Award for Outstanding Director of a Musical and was also named Howard County's Business Volunteer of the Year. The following year, she received the Aids Alliance Community Recognition Award.

She was inducted into the Howard County Women's Hall of Fame in 2002. In 2003, she won the Helen Hayes Award for Outstanding Direction of a Musical for her production of Jekyll and Hyde and was named one of Maryland's Top 100 Women by The Daily Record. She received the Outstanding Service to Educational Theatre award from the Maryland Theatre Association in 2005. On March 10, 2006, she opened a second branch of Toby's Dinner Theatre in Baltimore. She was named a Marylander of Distinction by Maryland Life Magazine in 2007 and was inducted into the Maryland Women's Hall of Fame in 2008.

Alongside her work with the theater, Orenstein has remained active in community service, having served as chair and director for the Howard County Arts Gala for multiple years and directed plays for the United Service Organizations (USO) and military troops overseas. In 1992, she created the Labels Project, an educational program designed to teach young people how to combat prejudice. She also established the Ben Carson Project, which provides transportation for inner-city children to see a play about the life of Ben Carson. In 2009, she launched an outreach program in collaboration with Loyola Clinical Centers that uses theater to assist children with disabilities, including autism and Down syndrome. In 2012, she received the Sue Hess Maryland Arts Advocate of the Year Award from Maryland Citizens for the Arts.

== Personal life ==
Toby Press met her husband, Hal Orenstein, while they were both involved with their youth group at Temple Young Israel in the Bronx. They married in 1959, and the couple relocated to the Washington, D.C. area after Hal, an economist, accepted a job there. They have two children, a son, Jeff, born in 1961, and a daughter, Mindy, born in 1963.

In 1962, after her mother died from lupus, Orenstein took in her 15-year-old sister. Her interest in creating programs for children with disabilities is informed by her family experiences, as she has one grandchild with Asperger syndrome (now under the umbrella of autism spectrum disorder) and another with dyslexia. She has incorporated her love of theater into family traditions, including adding choreography to songs during her family's Passover Seder. Orenstein has stated that she considers her work in theater to be her hobby as well as her career.
