= Steve Blanchard =

American stage actor

- Born: Steven “Steve” Blanchard; December 4, 1958 (age 67); Bryans Road, Maryland
- Other name: Steven
- Occupations: Actor, singer
- Years active: 1981–present
- Spouse: Meredith Inglesby
- Website: steveblanchard.net

Steve Blanchard (born December 4, 1958) is an American stage actor and singer best known for his musical theatre roles, being most closely associated with the role of The Beast in the musical Beauty and the Beast, which he played on Broadway for eight years. In recent years, he has played the role of "Pa" in several regional theatre productions of the musical version of Little House on the Prairie. He also guest stars in television roles and released Northbound Train, a solo CD where he sings songs from shows that he has been in.

== Early life and career ==
Blanchard was born in York, Pennsylvania. He attended the University of Maryland. Blanchard is an alum of the Columbia Center for Theatrical Arts.

After college, Blanchard performed in dinner theatre. In 1981, he played the title role in Hans Christian Andersen in New York City. After this, he appeared in productions in The Threepenny Opera in Boston at the Charles Playhouse; in Sleep of Reason at Baltimore's Center stage; in Godspell and Hot Mikado at the Ford's Theatre in Washington, DC; in The Robber Bridegroom at the West End in Virginia; and in Jesus Christ Superstar at the Candlewood Playhouse. He understudied Brent Spiner as Aramis in the 1984 Broadway revival of The Three Musketeers, but the show closed after a week, and Blanchard did not get the opportunity to perform the role.

== Broadway and later roles ==
Blanchard's first Broadway appearance was in the role of Lancelot du Lac in the 1993 revival of Camelot and subsequent national tour. He then starred in the musical Beauty and the Beast as Gaston and the Beast, playing the latter role on Broadway for eight years, ending in 2007. Blanchard toured in the U.S. National companies of A Funny Thing Happened on the Way to the Forum in 1987, Ken Hill's Phantom of the Opera in 1989 (in which he performed for almost three years), and Camelot in 1992.

Off-Broadway, Blanchard originated the role of Johnny in the musical version of Johnny Guitar at the Century Center for the Performing Arts in March 2004. He appeared in the off-Broadway musical Frankenstein, a New Musical, in 2007 as the Condemned Man/the Creature. He also appeared in An Oak Tree off-Broadway.

On national tours, Blanchard played Joseph Pulitzer on the first national tour of Newsies with his wife, Meredith Inglesby (Hannah). He began the tour when it kicked off on October 22, 2014 in Schenectady, NY and continued to play the role until its close on October 2, 2016 in Austin, TX.

In regional theatre, he appeared in the musical Chess as Freddie Trumper at the Paper Mill Playhouse, Millburn, New Jersey in 1992. In the mid-1990s, he appeared St. Louis Rep's Esmeralda, Westbury's Annie Get Your Gun and Atlanta's South Pacific. In 1995, he played the roles of "Fred Anderson" and the "Headless Ghost" in Alan Menken's version of A Christmas Carol at the Madison Square Garden theatre. He has performed the role of "Pa" in productions of the stage musical version of Little House on the Prairie in regional theatres starting at the Guthrie Theatre, Minneapolis, Minnesota in 2008 and then the Paper Mill Playhouse, from September 2009-October 2009. He portrayed Julian Marsh in 42nd Street at the TUTS, Houston, Texas in July 2009 and at Ogunquit Playhouse, Ogunquit Maine in July 2019.

On television, Blanchard has made guest appearances on prime-time shows such as Law & Order and Third Watch and in daytime dramas. He also sang the title role in the original recording of the new musical, Sundown, based on the Legend of Doc Holliday. He has a solo CD, Northbound Train, on which he sings songs from shows that he has been in.

In 2026 he appeared in Season 4, Episode 6 ("Racket Club") of Tulsa King.
