= Pittsburgh station (Baltimore and Ohio Railroad) =

Pittsburgh
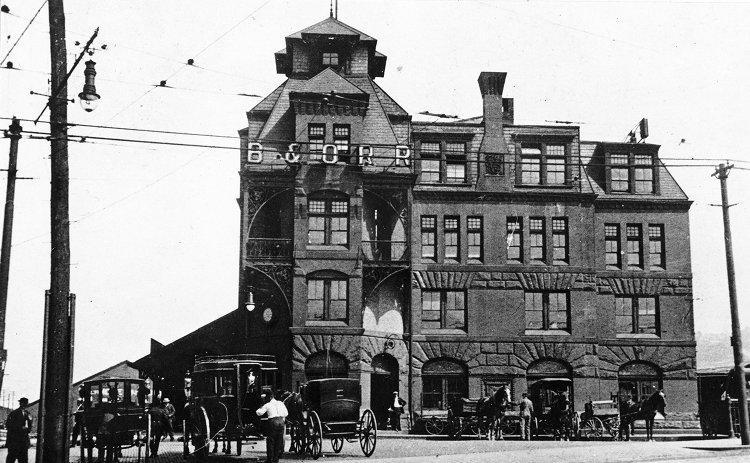
- Baltimore & Ohio Railroad Station, 1900

General information
- Location: Smithfield Street along Second Avenue, Pittsburgh, Pennsylvania; U.S.
- Coordinates: 40.4363°N 80.0007°W
- Owner: Baltimore and Ohio Railroad

History
- Opened: 1887
- Closed: 1955

Former services
Preceding station	Baltimore and Ohio Railroad	Following station
Millville toward Chicago	Main Line	Hazelwood toward Jersey City
Hazelwood toward Cincinnati	Cincinnati – Pittsburgh	Terminus
Terminus	Buffalo, Rochester and Pittsburgh Railway	Ribold Junction toward Buffalo
Location

B&O Railroad Depot was one of several railroad stations in the city of Pittsburgh, Pennsylvania, during the late 19th and early 20th century. The station was built in 1887, 16 years after the B&O Railroad opened its first railroad line into Pittsburgh. The station was built next to the Monongahela River. B&O railroad trains also used the Pittsburgh & Lake Erie Railroad Station for services that continued westward towards Chicago via the Pittsburgh & Lake Erie Railroad. In 1955 the station was demolished to make room for an interstate highway and remaining services were transferred to Grant Street Station. The building was designed by Frank Furness who also constructed the B&O Railroad's Philadelphia station.

At the time of its 1955 closing, major named long distance passenger trains making stops at the station included:

- Ambassador
- Capitol Limited
- Columbian
- Cleveland Night Express
- Shenandoah
- Washington–Chicago Express
- Washingtonian

Additionally, the B&O operated a train from Pittsburgh to Buffalo via DuBois and East Salamanca.

== Gallery ==
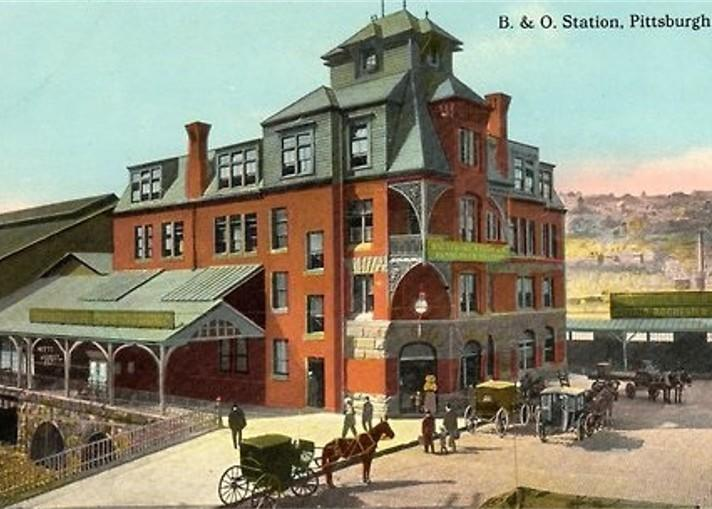
The B&O Railroad Depot in the 1890s

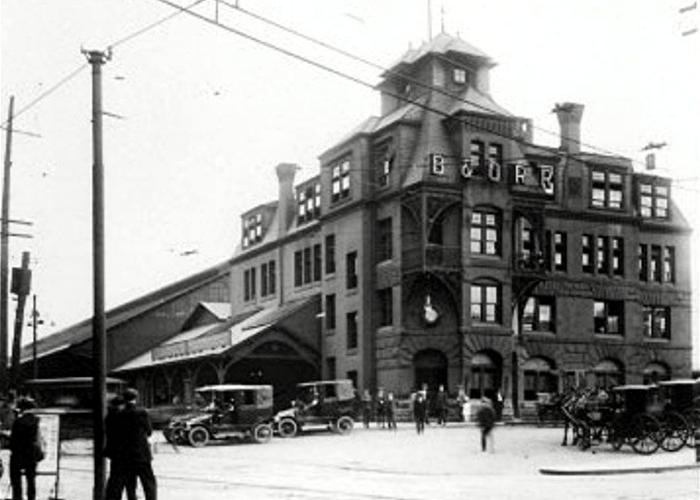
B&O Station in 1911

== See also ==
- Union Station (Pittsburgh)
- Wabash Pittsburgh Terminal
- Interstate 376 at the Smithfield Street Bridge
