= Baltimore and Ohio Railroad Station =

Baltimore and Ohio Railroad Station (or variants) can refer to the following railway stations in the United States: (by state then city or town)

- Water Street Station in Wilmington, Delaware
- Grand Central Station (Chicago) in Chicago, Illinois
- Springfield station (Illinois) in Springfield, Illinois
- Connersville station in Connersville, Indiana
- Gary Union Station in Gary, Indiana
- Miller station in Miller, Gary, Indiana
- Nappanee station in Nappanee, Indiana
- Mount Royal Station in Baltimore, Maryland
- Brunswick station (Maryland), Brunswick, Maryland
- Baltimore and Ohio Railroad Station (Oakland) in Oakland, Maryland
- Silver Spring Baltimore and Ohio Railroad Station in Silver Spring, Maryland
- Athens B & O Train Depot in Athens, Ohio
- Barnesville Baltimore and Ohio Railroad Depot in Barnesville, Ohio
- Baltimore and Ohio Railroad Station (Philadelphia), also known as the 24th Street Station, in Philadelphia, Pennsylvania
- Baltimore and Ohio Station (Pittsburgh) in Pittsburgh, Pennsylvania
- Pittsburgh & Lake Erie Railroad Station in Pittsburgh, Pennsylvania—also used as the city's B&O station
- Philippi B & O Railroad Station in Philippi, West Virginia
- Wheeling Baltimore and Ohio Railroad Passenger Station in Wheeling, West Virginia

== See also ==
- Stations along Baltimore and Ohio Railroad lines
- Baltimore and Ohio Railroad
