= West Virginian (B&O train) =

West Virginian Tri Stater
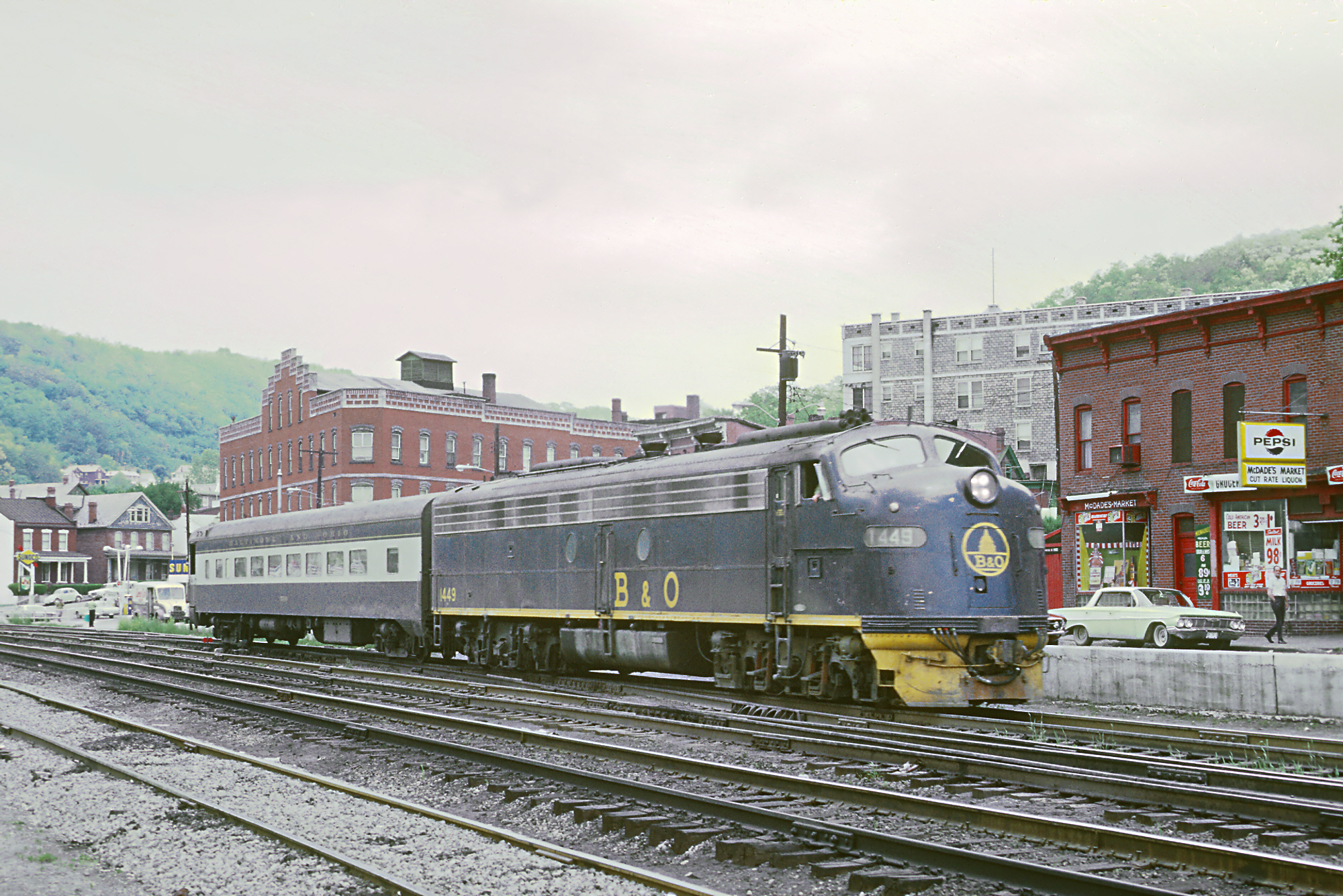
- The West Virginian at Cumberland in 1969

Overview
- Service type: Inter-city rail
- Status: Discontinued
- Locale: Mid-Atlantic United States
- Last service: July 4, 1964
- Former operator(s): Baltimore & Ohio Railroad

Route
- Termini: New York City; Parkersburg, West Virginia
- Train number(s): 23/24

Technical
- Track gauge: 4 ft 8 1/2 in (1,435 mm)

The West Virginian, train #23 and #24, was a passenger train operated by the Baltimore and Ohio Railroad on a route between Jersey City, New Jersey, and Parkersburg, West Virginia.

For much of the route the West Virginian was a daylight train. Traveling overnight from Jersey City, it left Washington, DC, in the early morning and made the 351-mile trip to Parkersburg in approximately five hours. This train was especially patronized on weekends as many Federal workers traveled home to West Virginia. Eastbound, the train was combined at Cumberland, Maryland, with either the Chicago - Washington Express or the Cleveland Night Express with through cars continuing on to New York. By 1954 the West Virginian was combined with the Cleveland Night Express westbound and was switched out at Cumberland for the trip to Parkersburg.

However, improving road conditions in West Virginia began taking its toll on ridership. Passenger counts fell and the train was extended to Cincinnati, Ohio. This was done to accommodate changes in the overall B&O schedule, including the discontinuance of the Diplomat on September 18, 1960. The Diplomat had brought large amount of head-end mail and express packages from Cincinnati, and without a means to move what was becoming the major revenue source for all trains, the B&O changed the schedule of the West Virginian.

On December 8, 1962, the train was renamed the Tri Stater, and received upgrades in equipment. However, this was not successful in attracting riders. Eventually, as losses mounted, the train was dropped on July 4, 1964.

In the late 1960s, the name was reused for a Washington–Parkersburg train (#23/30), which ran combined with the Capitol Limited between Washington and Cumberland.
