= Blue Ridge Limited =

Overview
- Service type: Inter-city rail
- Status: Discontinued
- Locale: Mid-Atlantic United States, Midwestern United States
- First service: 1934
- Last service: February 20, 1949
- Former operator: Baltimore & Ohio Railroad

Route
- Termini: Washington, D.C. Chicago
- Train number: 15/16

Technical
- Track gauge: 4 ft 8 1/2 in (1,435 mm)

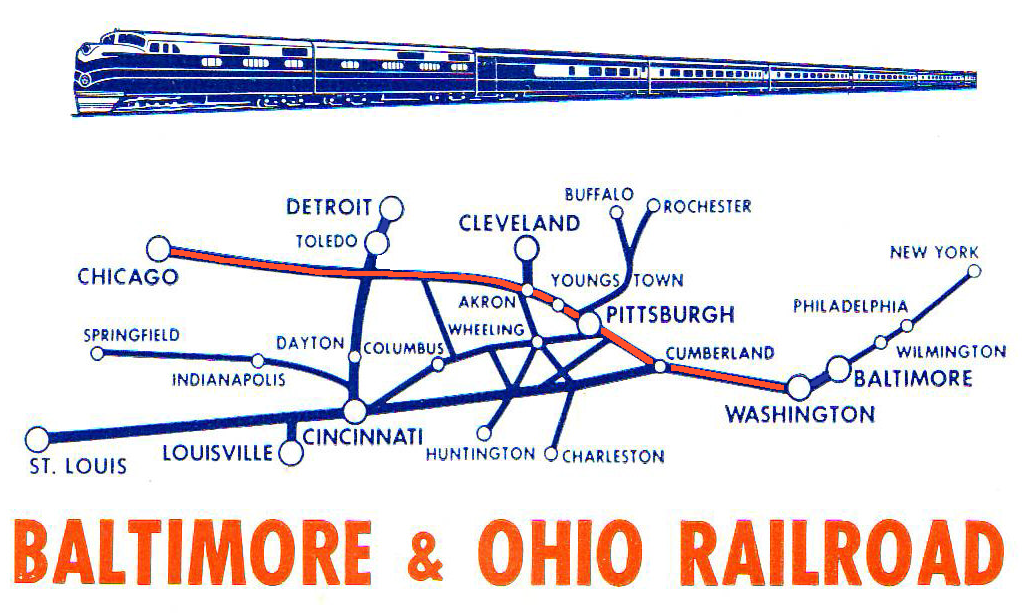
Route of the Blue Ridge Limited (in orange)

The Blue Ridge Limited was one of six daily American named passenger trains operated by the Baltimore and Ohio Railroad (B&O) during the late 1930s between Washington, D. C. and Chicago, Illinois, via Pittsburgh, Pennsylvania. Inaugurated in 1934, the once high-status train was discontinued in 1949.

== History ==
In 1934, the B&O's eastbound train number 16 was named the Blue Ridge Limited and in 1937 its westbound counterpart, train 15 was also named the Blue Ridge Limited.

With ridership dropping after World War II, the B&O discontinued the Blue Ridge Limited on February 20, 1949.

== Schedule and equipment ==
In the early years, the Blue Ridge Limited's consist was consistent with a first-class train, including reclining seats in coaches, a sleeper and a lounge with sleeping accommodations. A diner car, added in Pittsburgh, served breakfast and lunch to passengers going west. It was steam-powered until well after World War II.

The westbound Blue Ridge Limited left Washington a few hours ahead of the Shenandoah but had a slower schedule due to the numerous head-end cars it carried. The eastbound Blue Ridge Limited's schedule was revised in 1938 so that it began in Pittsburgh, instead of Chicago, thus reducing the number of Chicago-Washington trains.

A lounge car was added in 1945 between Washington and Akron to increase ridership, and in 1947 the lounge car was extended all the way to Chicago.

== Stations ==
Station	State
Baltimore (Camden Station)	Maryland
Washington (Washington Union Station)	District of Columbia
Cumberland	Maryland
Pittsburgh (Pittsburgh & Lake Erie Railroad Station)	Pennsylvania
Youngstown (Youngstown station)	Ohio
Akron (Union Station (Akron, Ohio))	Ohio
Garrett (Garrett station, north of Fort Wayne)	Indiana
Chicago (Grand Central Station)	Illinois
