= Silver Spring station (Baltimore and Ohio Railroad) =

Railway station in Montgomery County, Maryland, US

Silver Spring, MD
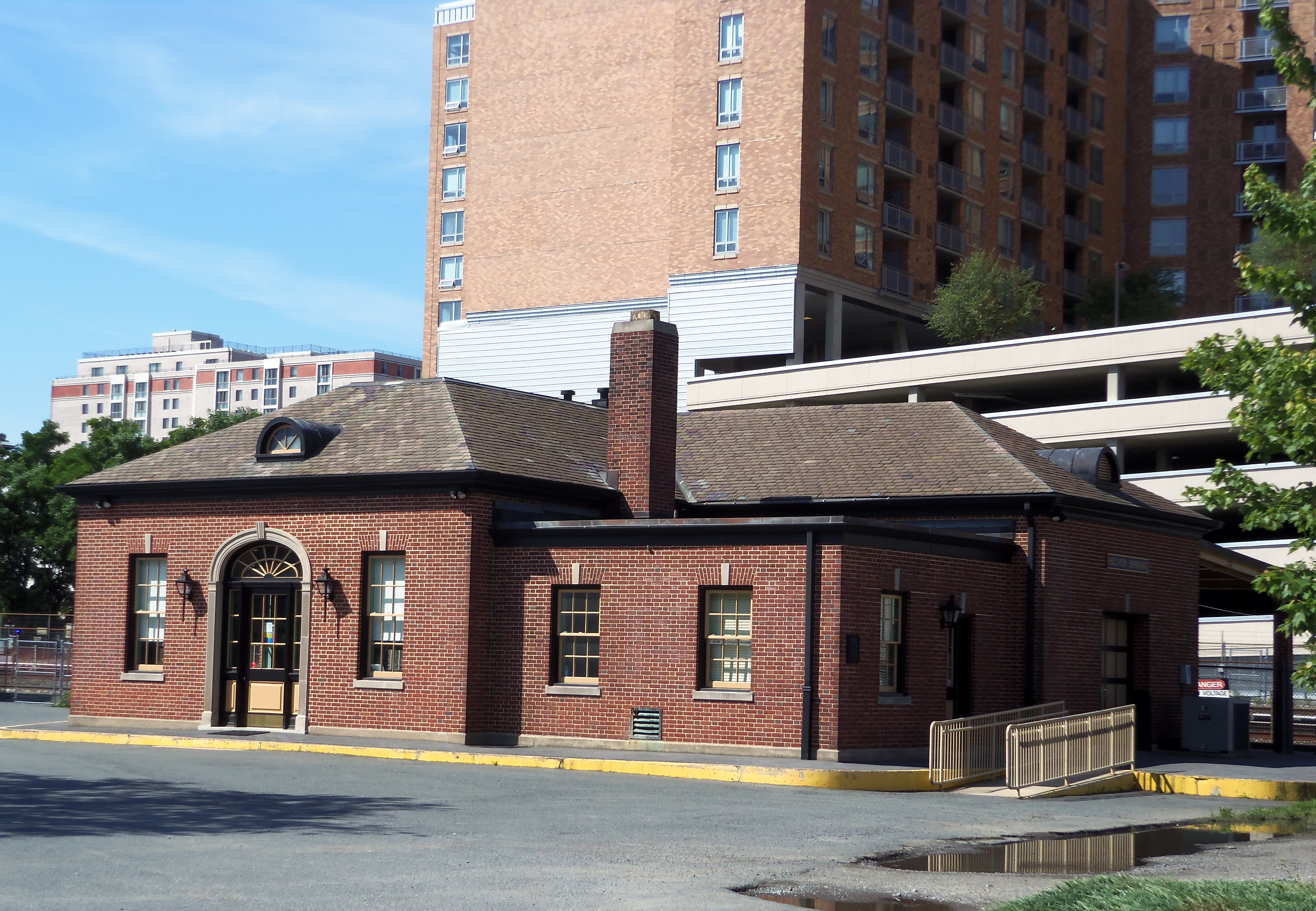
- Silver Spring station in 2012

Construction
- Accessible: No

History
- Opened: 1878
- Closed: 1986 (Amtrak); 2000 (MARC)
- Rebuilt: 1945

Former services
Preceding station	MARC	Following station
Kensington toward Martinsburg or Frederick	Brunswick Line Closed 2000	Union Station Terminus
Preceding station	Amtrak	Following station
Rockville toward Martinsburg	Blue Ridge Discontinued 1986	Washington, D.C. Terminus
Preceding station	Baltimore and Ohio Railroad	Following station
Woodside toward Chicago	Main Line	North Takoma toward Jersey City
- Silver Spring Baltimore and Ohio Railroad Station
- U.S. National Register of Historic Places
- Location within Maryland Location within the United States
- Location: 8100 Georgia Avenue; Silver Spring, Maryland
- Coordinates: 38°59′24″N 77°1′37″W
- Area: 0.5 acres (0.20 ha)
- Built: 1945
- Built by: Steiner Construction Co.
- Architect: Engineer of Buildings, B & O RR Co.
- Architectural style: Colonial Revival
- NRHP reference No.: 00001035
- Added to NRHP: August 31, 2000
Location

Silver Spring station (listed as the Silver Spring Baltimore and Ohio Railroad Station on the National Register of Historic Places) is a former train station on the Metropolitan Subdivision in Silver Spring in Montgomery County, Maryland. It was built in 1945 by the Baltimore and Ohio Railroad on the foundation of a previous station, a Victorian-style brick structure built in 1878. It served intercity trains until 1986 and commuter rail until 2000. Today, it is owned and operated as a museum by Montgomery Preservation, Inc., a non-profit organization.

== History ==
The station was designed in the Colonial Revival style and built from standardized plans developed for B&O stations in the mid-1940s.

In the Baltimore & Ohio era, the station was the first stop out of Washington on westbound long-distance trains. The roster in 1956 included:

- Ambassador (Baltimore–Detroit)
- Capitol Limited (Jersey City–Chicago)
- Cleveland Night Express (Baltimore–Cleveland)
- Columbian (Washington–Chicago)
- Diplomat (Jersey City–St. Louis)
- Metropolitan Special (Jersey City–St. Louis)
- National Limited (Jersey City–St. Louis)
- Shenandoah (Jersey City–Chicago)
- Washington-Chicago Express (Washington–Chicago)

Amtrak's Blue Ridge to Cumberland served the station from 1973 until it was discontinued in 1986.

MARC Brunswick Line service at the station ended in 2000, and trains now stop at nearby Silver Spring station where transfer to the Washington Metro is available.

The station was added to the National Register of Historic Places in 2000 and restored in 2002. It retains its original 1940s waiting-room furniture and recessed fluorescent lighting fixtures. Exhibits on the history of Silver Spring and the B&O Station are provided by the Silver Spring Historical Society and Montgomery Preservation.

The eastbound waiting room, a small rectangular building of similar design, stood on the south side of the tracks. Built along with the station in 1945, it was rebuilt in 1976 to make way for tracks laid for the Washington Metro. An underground pedestrian tunnel connected the two buildings beneath the track bed. In 2008, the building was demolished to make way for other development.
