= SkyDome (disambiguation) =

SkyDome is the former name of the Rogers Centre stadium in Toronto, Ontario, Canada.

Sky Dome, Skydome or SkyDome may also refer to:

- Coventry Skydome, an arena built in 1999 in Coventry, England
- Skydome of Shhijiashunang, a stadium in Xi'an, China
- Walkup Skydome or J. Lawrence Walkup Skydome, a stadium in Flagstaff, Arizona built between 1975 and 1977
- Gocheok Sky Dome, a domed baseball stadium located in Gocheok-dong, Seoul, South Korea.
- Skydome, a technique used to simulate skies in 3D graphics; see skybox
- Sky Dome, a Strata-Dome railcar
