= Washington–Chicago Express =

Washington–Chicago Express (westbound) / Chicago-Washington Express (eastbound)
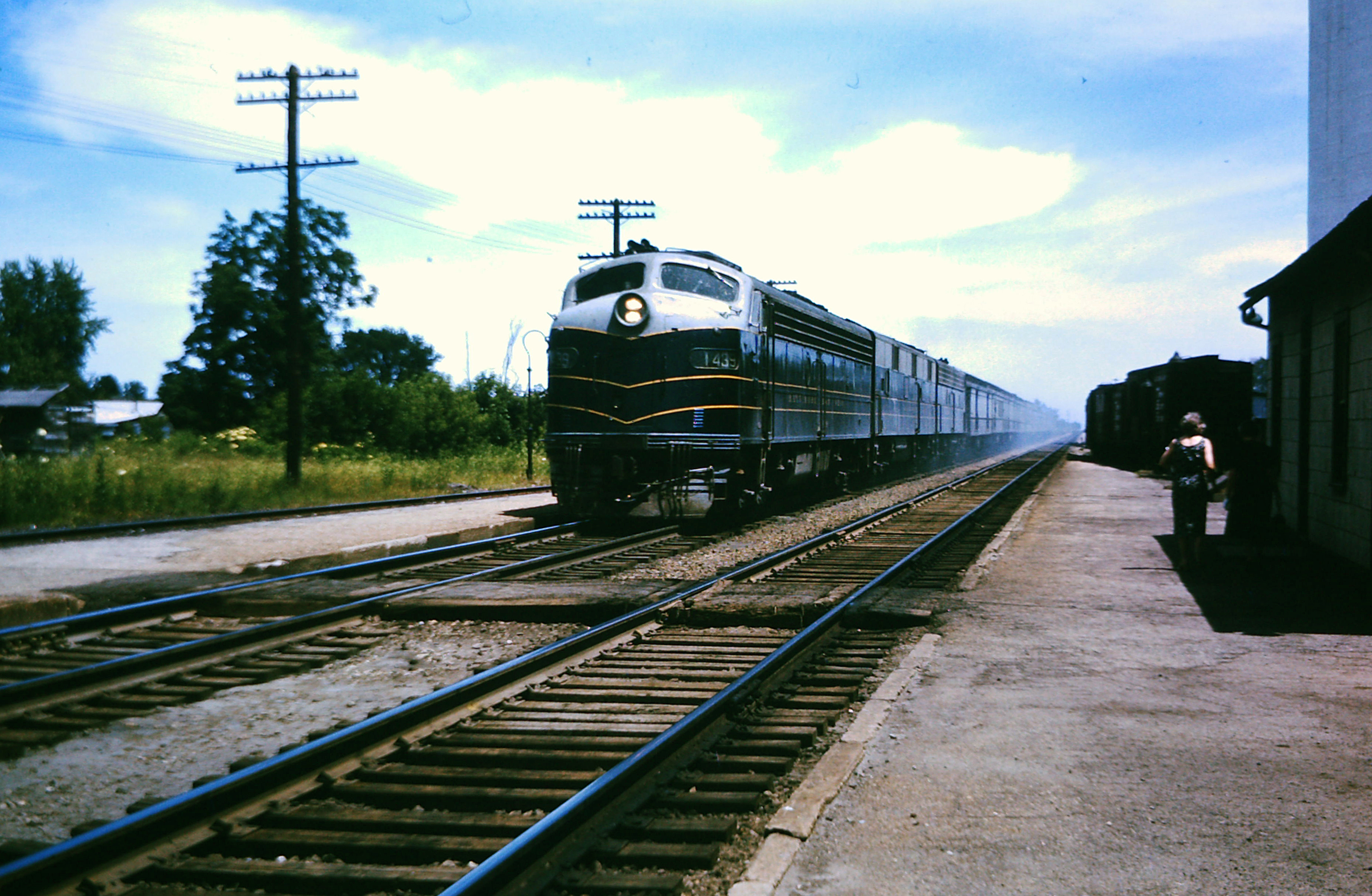
- The Washington–Chicago Express at La Paz, Indiana, in 1963

Overview
- Service type: Inter-city rail
- Status: Discontinued
- Locale: Mid-Atlantic United States; Midwestern United States
- First service: 1935; 1960
- Last service: 1936 c. 1969
- Former operator(s): Baltimore & Ohio Railroad

Route
- Termini: Washington, D.C. Chicago, Illinois
- Distance travelled: 767.5 miles (1,235.2 km)
- Service frequency: Daily
- Train number(s): 9 (westbound); 10 (eastbound)

On-board services
- Seating arrangements: Reclining Seat Coaches (1961)
- Sleeping arrangements: Roomettes, Duplex roomettes, double bedrooms,
- Observation facilities: Dining Lounge car

Technical
- Track gauge: 4 ft 8 1/2 in (1,435 mm)

The Washington–Chicago Express, an American named passenger train of the Baltimore and Ohio Railroad (B&O), was one of four daily B&O trains operating between Washington, D.C., and Chicago, Illinois, via Pittsburgh, Pennsylvania, during the 1930s–1960s. Other B&O trains of that period on the route were the Capitol Limited, Columbian, and the Shenandoah.

Operating westbound as Train # 9, the Chicago Express, and eastbound as Train # 10, the Washington Express, it was an "accommodation" train, meaning that it made stops at most stations along the route bypassed by B&O's other trains, resulting in a slower timecard than the more prestigious Capitol Limited. The Washington–Chicago Express required a leisurely 18½ hours for its 767-mile (1,234 km) journey, compared to the faster Capitol Limited's 16-hour pace. The Washington–Chicago Express was also B&O's primary train for mail and Railway Express Agency shipments, having heavy head end equipment consisting of several Railway Post Office (RPO) cars, baggage cars, and bulk mail boxcars. The Washington–Chicago Express continued to offer Pullman sleeping car and dining car service into the mid-1960s.

== Latter years ==
The ending of B&O's mail contract in the late-1960s by the U.S. Postal Service spelled the doom of the train, resulting in the discontinuation of its westbound train in 1967 before the advent of Amtrak in 1971. Between 1965 and 1967 the train's sleeping cars were shortened from Washington – Chicago to Pittsburgh – Chicago. Between 1967 and 1968 the train lost its sleeping cars and its dining car. The eastbound train Washington Express continued into 1968. The train was terminated by 1969, leaving the Capitol Limited as the B&O's only eastbound Chicago–Washington train. The Gateway, an eastbound-only Chicago–Pittsburgh train, briefly continued the #10 designation. The train operated as a daytime coach, with a food bar.

== Stations ==
Station	State
Baltimore (Camden Station)	Maryland
Washington (Union Station)	District of Columbia
Silver Spring (B&O station)	Maryland
Martinsburg	West Virginia
Cumberland	Maryland
Connellsville	Pennsylvania
McKeesport	Pennsylvania
Pittsburgh (P&L.E. Station)	Pennsylvania
New Castle	Pennsylvania
Youngstown	Ohio
Akron (Union Station)	Ohio
Deshler	Ohio
Gary (Union Station)	Indiana
South Chicago (South Chicago)	Illinois
Chicago (Grand Central Station)	Illinois

== Schedule and equipment ==
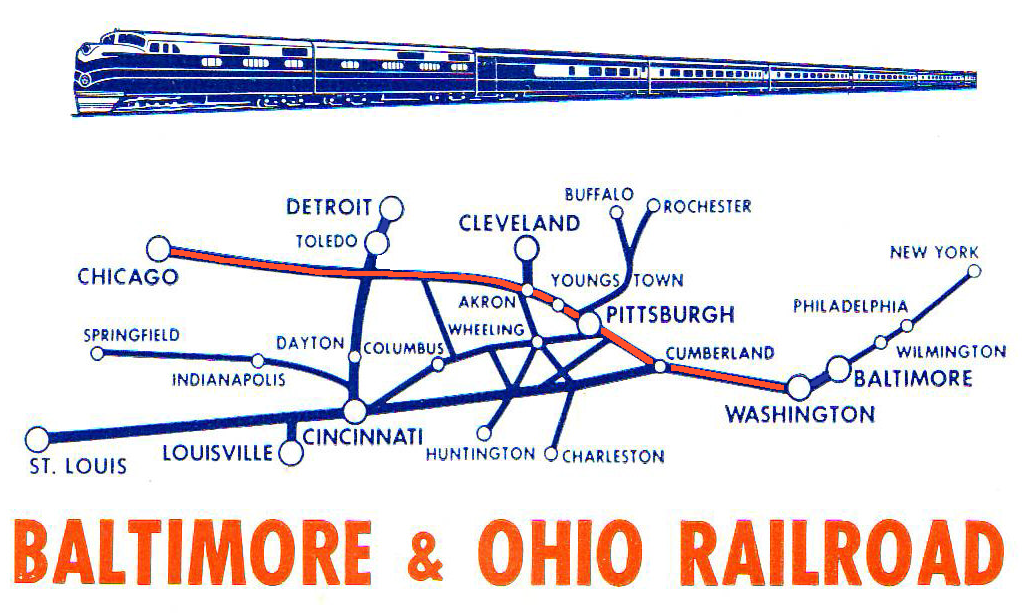
Route of the Washington–Chicago Express (in orange)

In addition to a Washington–Chicago through sleeping car and dining car providing full meal service en route, the B&O's Washington–Chicago Express also offered a "set-out" sleeper in Pittsburgh, Pennsylvania. In 1961, for example, the set-out sleeper for Washington was parked on a siding at Pittsburgh's Pittsburgh & Lake Erie Railroad Station (used by B&O's long-distance trains) and available for occupancy by passengers at 9:00 p.m., prior to the arrival of the eastbound Washington Express at 10:30 p.m. The sleeper was then coupled to the rear of the train during the 25-minute layover there.

In 1961, the westbound Chicago Express Train # 9 operated on the following schedule (departure times at principal stops shown in blue, connecting Budd Rail Diesel Car from Baltimore, Maryland, in yellow):

City	Departure time
Baltimore, Md. (Camden Station)	1:00 p.m.
Washington, D.C. (Union Station)	2:15 p.m.
Silver Spring, Maryland (B&O station)	2:30 p.m.
Martinsburg, W. Va.	3:56 p.m.
Cumberland, Md.	5:45 p.m.
Connellsville, Pa.	8:20 p.m.
McKeesport, Pa.	9:16 p.m.
Pittsburgh, Pa. (P&L.E. Station)	10:10 p.m.
New Castle, Pa.	11:16 p.m.
Youngstown, Ohio (B&O Station)	11:41 p.m.
Akron, Ohio (Union Station)	12:56 a.m.
Deshler, Ohio	3:47 a.m.
Gary, Ind. (CT) (Union Station)	6:36 a.m.
South Chicago, Ill. (South Chicago)	6:55 a.m.
Chicago, Ill. (Grand Central Station)	7:40 a.m.
source: B&O timetable, October 29, 1961
