= Gary Union Station =

Former railroad station in Gary, Indiana, United States

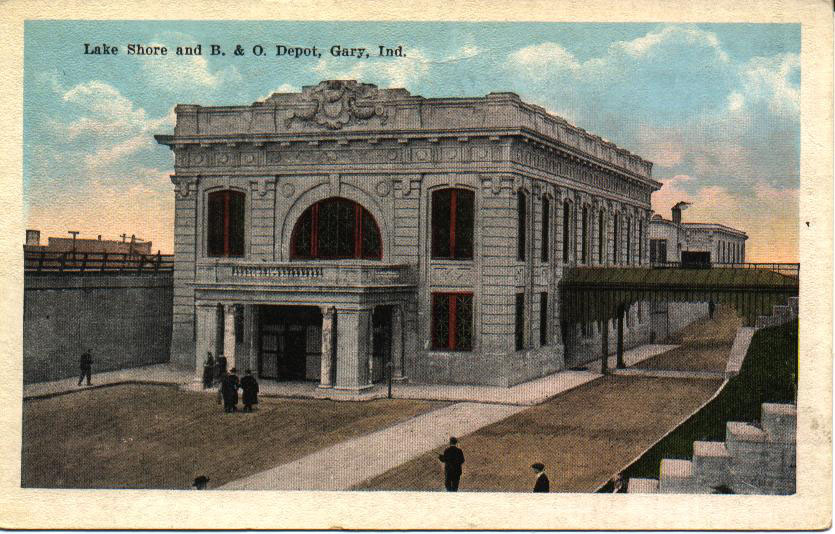
- A color postcard from 1910 of Gary Union Station

General information
- Location: 251 Broadway; Gary, Indiana

History
- Opened: 1910
- Closed: April 30, 1971

Former services
Preceding station	Baltimore and Ohio Railroad	Following station
Chicago Terminus	Main Line	Miller toward Jersey City
Indiana Harbor toward Chicago	Main Line	Miller toward Jersey City
Preceding station	New York Central Railroad	Following station
Indiana Harbor toward Chicago	Main Line	Millers toward New York
Kirk Yard toward Chicago	Chesterton Local	Millers toward Chesterton
- Gary Union Station
- U.S. National Register of Historic Places
- Interactive map of Gary Union Station
- Location: 251 Broadway; Gary, Indiana
- Coordinates: 41°36′20.3″N 87°20′13.07″W
- Architect: M. A. Lang
- Architectural style: Neoclassical
- NRHP reference No.: 100004040
- Added to NRHP: June 6, 2019
Location

Union Station is a former union railway station in Gary, Indiana. It is located between the elevated lines of the Lake Shore and Michigan Southern Railway and Baltimore & Ohio Railroad and is just north of the Indiana Toll Road. Indiana Landmarks has placed the building on its 10 Most Endangered Places in Indiana list. The building is listed on the National Register of Historic Places.

== History ==
New York Central Railroad's first station in Gary was a simple boxcar, which the railroad delivered to the town in 1906 at the behest of the United States Steel Corporation. The permanent station was built in 1910, just four years after the city was founded.

The building was listed on the National Register of Historic Places in 2019.

In 2023, telecommunications firm Digital Equity LLC, the City of Gary, and Decay Devils broke ground on construction on an adaptive reuse project to convert the depot into a fiber optic network operations center, job training center and community space. The project had a goal of opening by fall 2024. However, the project was paused indefinitely in 2024.

== Location ==
The building faces west on Broadway. Because it sits between two raised rail lines, it is nearly invisible until one is next to it. The only sign still visible inside or outside the building is a painted notice on the front pillar that says “No Parking Cabs Only”. The method of construction has caused it to retain its structural integrity after 50 years of abandonment.

== Design ==
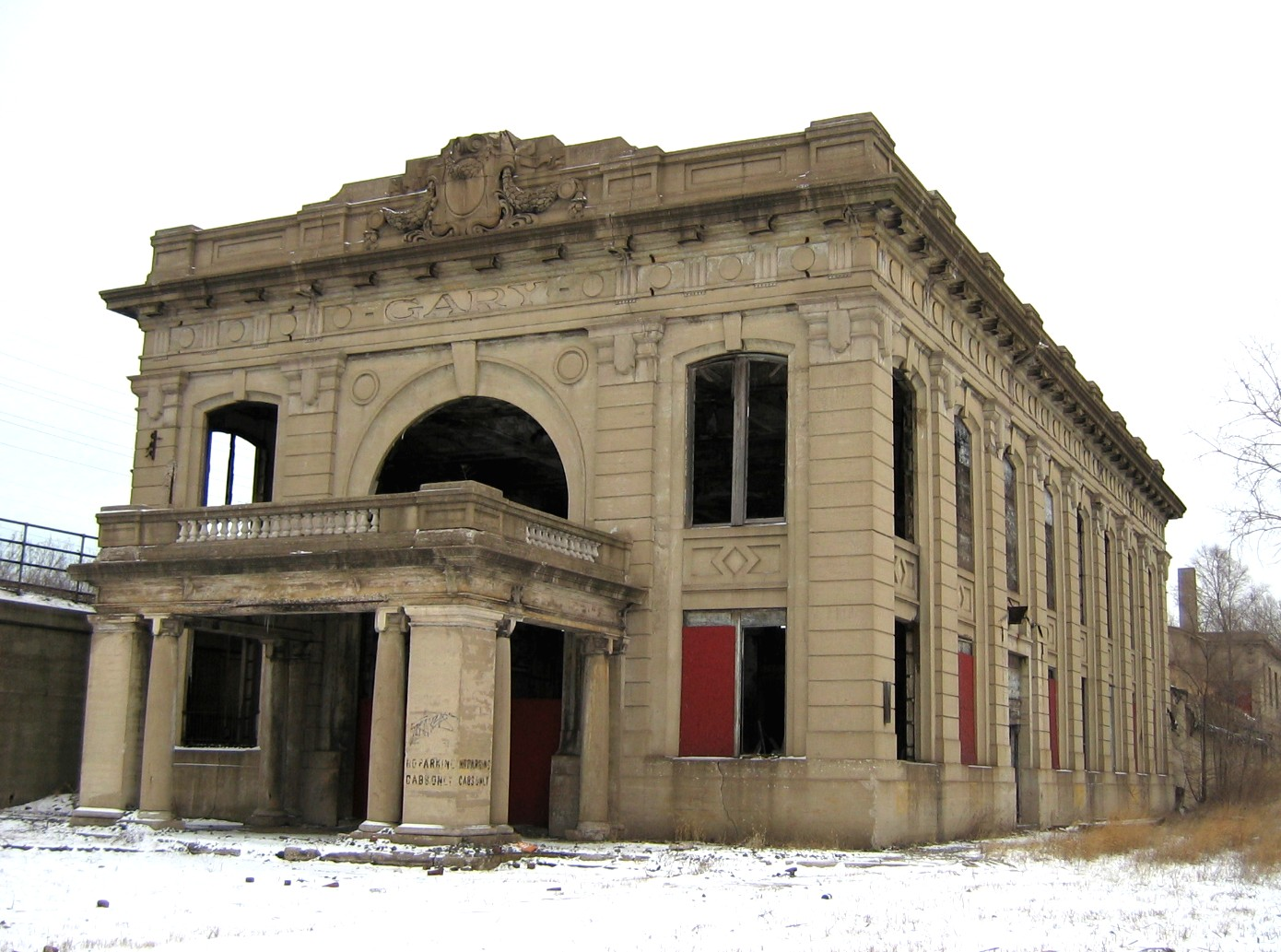
The station in 2007

The station building was built in a Beaux-Arts style utilizing the new cast-in-place concrete methods in which, after pouring, the concrete was scored to resemble stone.

=== Interior ===
The main room is a two stories hall. At the east end of the hall is a staircase to the loading platform on the upper level. Built into a hill, the building is only a single story in the back. A door on the south side leads from a cobblestone driveway. Across the drive is a staircase built up to track level along the south side. On the north there is a tunnel under the tracks to a stairway up to the loading platform.

== Passenger trains ==
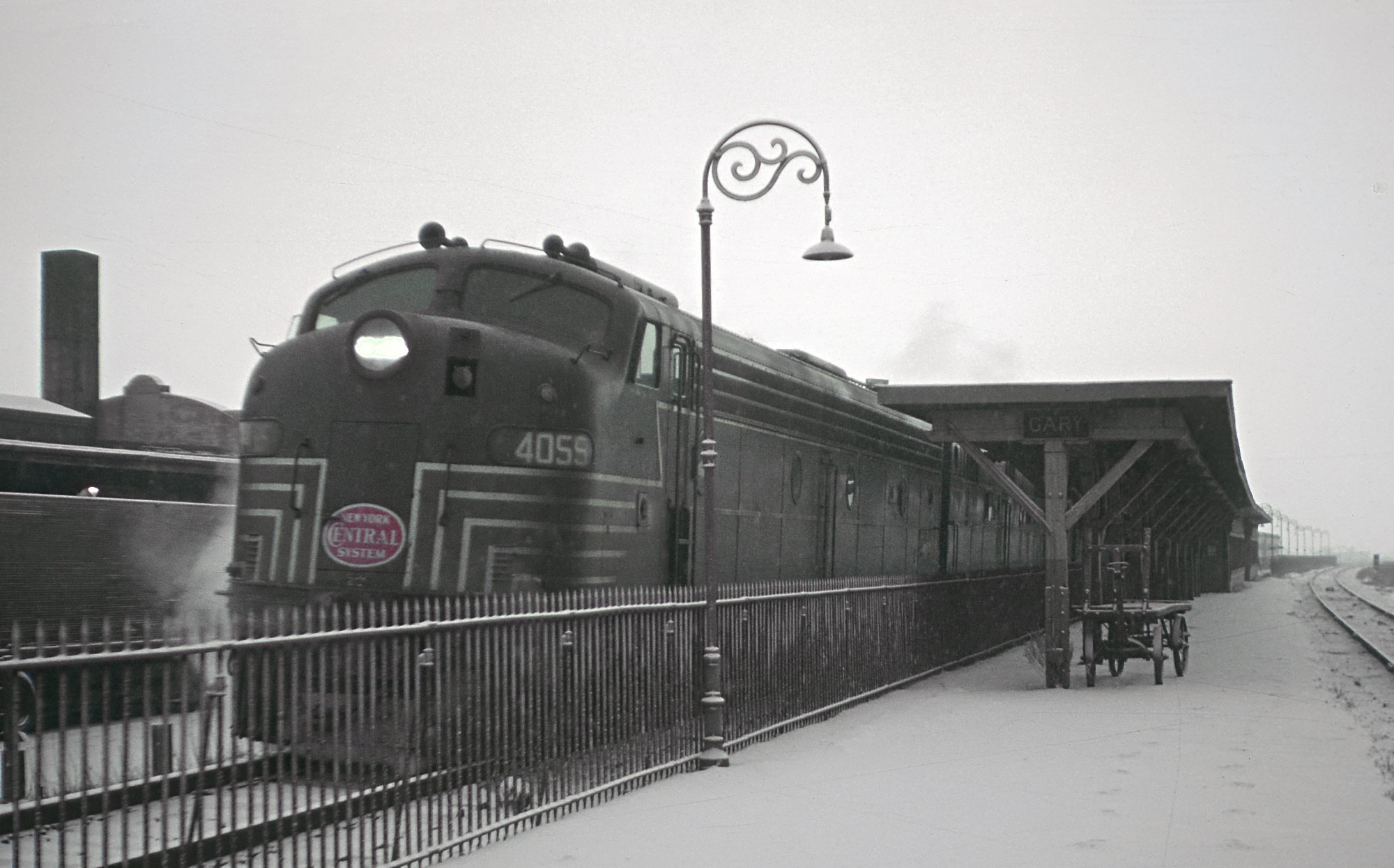
The New York Central's eastbound New York Special at Gary Union Station, February 1963

- Baltimore and Ohio:
  - Capitol Limited (Chicago–Washington)
  - Columbian (Chicago–Jersey City, after 1958, Baltimore)
  - Shenandoah (Chicago–Jersey City, after 1958, Baltimore)
  - Washington–Chicago Express (Chicago–Washington)
- New York Central Railroad:
  - Canadian-Niagara (Chicago-Toronto & Buffalo, eastbound), North Shore Limited (New York City & Toronto-Chicago, westbound)
  - Chicago Mercury (Chicago-Detroit)
  - Iroquois (New York-Chicago)
  - New England States (Boston-Chicago)
  - Wolverine (New York-Detroit-Chicago)

== Legacy ==
Successor stations in the vicinity today are the Northern Indiana Commuter Transportation District's Gary Metro Center and its Gary Airport station, both on the South Shore Line. Amtrak's Hammond–Whiting station (served by the Wolverine) is to the west in Hammond.

=== Popular culture ===
Gary's Union Station was used as an example for what could happen to a building in 30 years without humans providing maintenance and upkeep on Life After People: The Series (Season 1, Episode 2).

Union Station was a filming location for the 1951 Alan Ladd movie Appointment with Danger. This shows off a unique feature of the building not clearly visible in most photographs; the eight bar radial star design in each section of window, similar to the design of the British Union Flag. The similarity is probably accidental. Union Station was also featured in the 1996 film Original Gangstas where it served as the hideout for the gang known as The Rebels.
