= Akron Union Station =

Railway station in Akron, Ohio

Akron Union Depot Buckingham Building
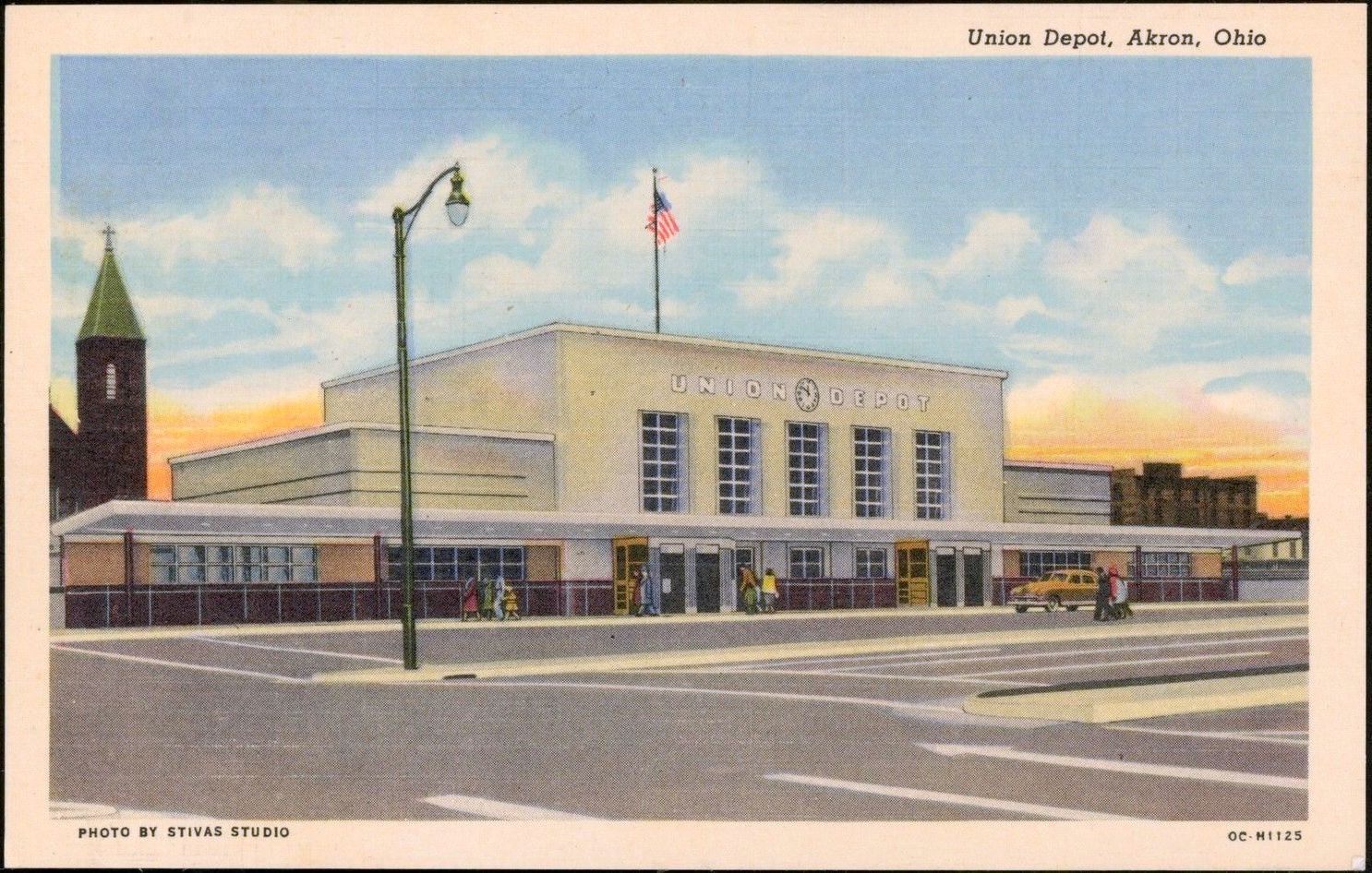
- The 1950 Akron Union Depot, c. 1950s

General information
- Coordinates: 41.0773°N 81.5167°W
- Owner: University of Akron

History
- Opened: April 28, 1950
- Closed: 1971

Former services
Preceding station	Baltimore and Ohio Railroad	Following station
Fostoria toward Chicago	Main Line	Youngstown toward Jersey City
Barberton toward Chicago	Main Line	Cuyahoga Falls toward Jersey City
Barberton toward Wheeling	Cleveland – Akron – Wheeling	Akron–Howard toward Cleveland
Preceding station	Pennsylvania Railroad	Following station
Barberton closed 1950 (Note: Akron-Hudson branch retained until 1958) toward Columbus	Columbus – Cleveland	Cuyahoga Falls toward Cleveland
Preceding station	Erie Railroad	Following station
Barberton toward Chicago	Main Line at Union Station until 1950	Tallmadge toward Jersey City
Location

Akron Union Station was a series of three union stations serving several passenger railroads in Akron, Ohio from 1852 to 1971. The station's tenants included the Baltimore & Ohio Railroad, Pennsylvania Railroad and Erie Railroad. It was a hub, serving train companies serving destinations in different directions, west, north, south and east.

== First station ==
The original station was constructed by the Cleveland and Pittsburgh Railroad in 1852. The Atlantic and Great Western Railroad moved their passenger service from a station near the modern Quaker Square to this station in 1864. The at-grade station was replaced in 1891 when a grade-separation project was completed through downtown Akron.

== Second station ==
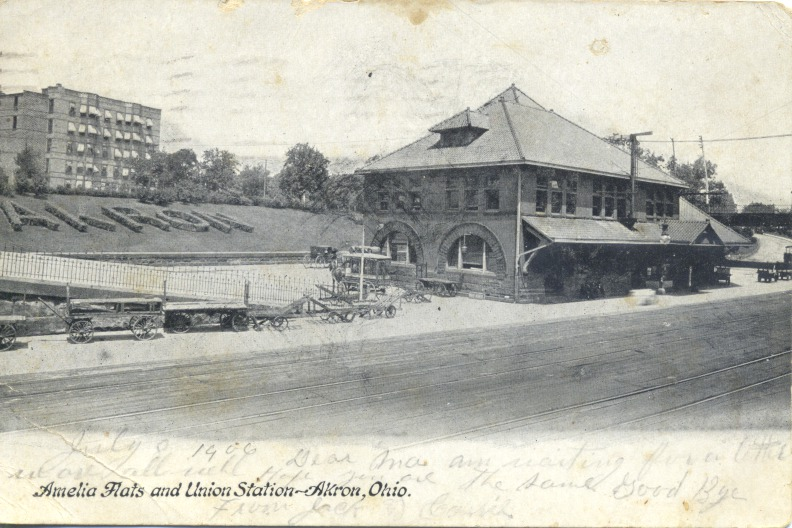
the second Akron Union Station, c. 1906

The second station building at 245 East Market Street (41.0828°N 81.5099°W), was completed and in operation in 1891. The Akron Division of the Baltimore & Ohio Railroad opened in the same year, directly connecting Akron to Lodi and Chicago. Upon opening to passengers, service was provided by the B&O, the Cleveland, Akron & Columbus Railroad (which had broken free of the Cleveland & Pittsburgh and its parent Pennsylvania Company), the New York, Pennsylvania & Ohio Railroad under lease of the New York, Lake Erie & Western Railroad, and the Pittsburgh & Western Railroad. The latter company later merged into the B&O, completing the main line from Pittsburgh to Chicago. The services of the Valley Railway were brought to the depot after a similar merge with the B&O. In 1899, the CA&C was returned to Pennsylvania Company control. The company merged into the Pennsylvania Railroad in 1919. The NYP&O was a part of the Erie Railroad by 1900. The station was closed in 1950 and it was demolished in 1951.

=== Passenger services ===
Representative services in 1946 featured these trains:

- Baltimore & Ohio
  - Ambassador (Detroit, MI - Baltimore, MD)
  - Blue Ridge Limited (Washington, DC - Chicago, IL via Pittsburgh) (west-bound only)
  - Capitol Limited (Chicago, IL - Jersey City, NJ via Pittsburgh) (east-bound)
  - Cleveland Night Express (Baltimore, MD - Cleveland, OH)
  - Shenandoah (Chicago, IL - Jersey City, NJ)
  - unnamed Cleveland - Akron - Wheeling service
- Erie Railroad
  - Atlantic Express/Pacific Express (Chicago, IL - Hoboken, NJ)
  - Erie Limited (Chicago, IL - Hoboken, NJ)
  - Midlander (Chicago, IL - Hoboken, NJ) (forerunner to the Lake Cities)
- Pennsylvania Railroad
  - Akronite (Akron - New York, NY)
  - Clevelander (New York, NY - Cleveland, OH, via Akron) (west-bound only)
  - Gotham Limited/Golden Triangle (Chicago, IL - Cleveland, OH, via Akron)
  - unnamed Cleveland - Akron - Columbus - Cincinnati service, unnamed Cleveland - Akron local service

== Third station and final years ==
The third station, Akron Union Depot, reflecting the shift of location, was opened in 1950 and was located five blocks away, on the east side of the tracks, at 220 Wolf Ledges Parkway. The Erie Railroad split away in 1949, moving to a separate station on the adjacent Broadway Street. By the 1950s the Pennsylvania Railroad eliminated the Columbus to Cleveland trains, and Union Station was served by an Akron to Hudson taxi shuttle. The station was closed in 1971, as the last trains being the B&O's Capitol Limited and a shortened Akron-Washington Shenandoah day train. The Capitol Limited would be subsequently rerouted with the assumption of passenger services by Amtrak. Akron briefly saw train service in the 1990s with the arrival of the rerouting of the Broadway Limited and the Three Rivers.

== Disposition today ==
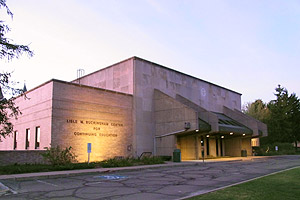

The 1950 station is currently used by the University of Akron as its Buckingham Center for Continuing Education. The depot was scheduled for demolition in 2010 as part of a new law school to be built by the university, but plans were scrapped due to local backlash. As a result, a new expansion and renovation was instead added to the C. Blake McDowell Law Center, across the street from Buckingham. Buckingham has been internally renovated as of March 2020.
