= Xi'an City People's Stadium =

Sports venue in Xi'an, China

Coordinates: 34°16′08.79″N 108°57′15.67″E

Xi'an City People's Stadium (Simplified Chinese: 西安市人民体育场) is a multi-use stadium in Xi'an, China. It is currently used mostly for football matches. The stadium holds 18,000 people. This stadium was built on 8 October 1952.
