= Youngstown station (Baltimore and Ohio Railroad) =

Railroad station in Youngstown, Ohio

Youngstown, OH
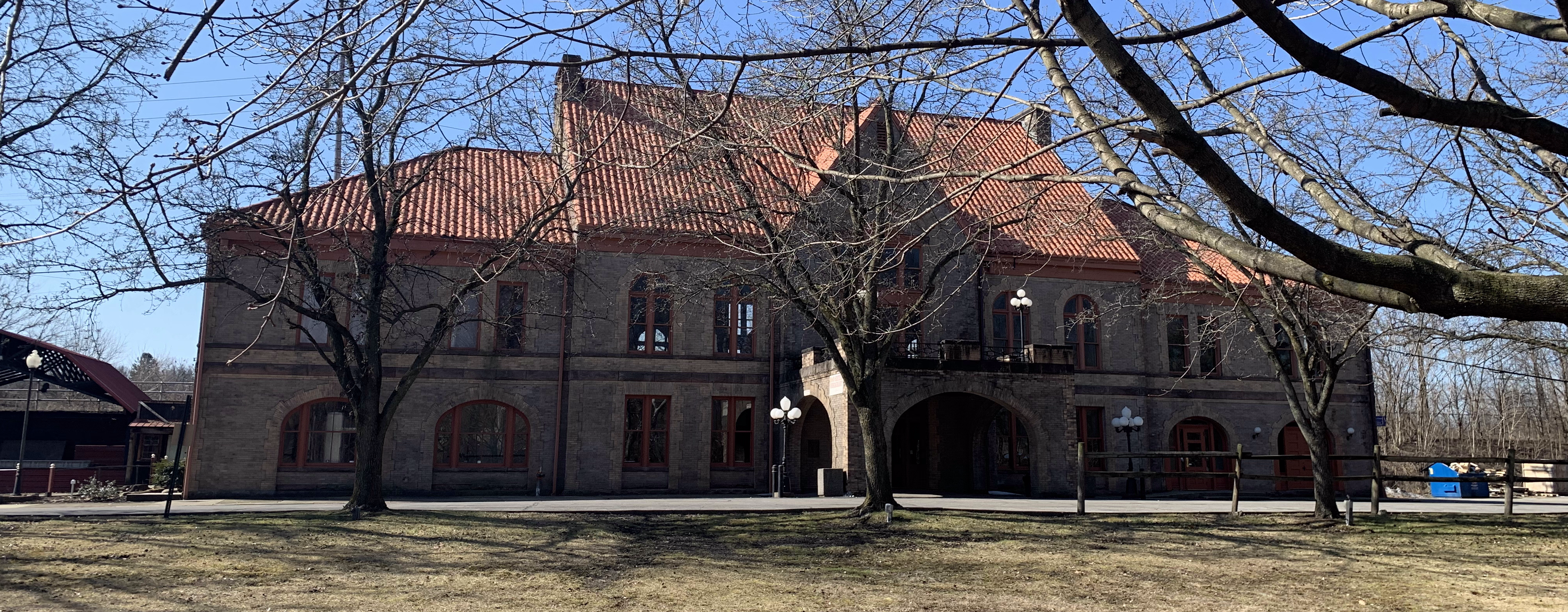
- The former station in March 2021

General information
- Location: 530 Mahoning Avenue; Youngstown, Ohio
- Coordinates: 41°6′10″N 80°39′30″W
- Line: CSX New Castle Subdivision

Other information
- Website: https://banquetatthebno.com

History
- Opened: 1905; November 10, 1990; May 16, 1997
- Closed: 1971; September 10, 1995; March 7, 2005

Former services
Preceding station	Amtrak	Following station
Akron toward Chicago	Three Rivers 1997–2005	Pittsburgh toward New York
Akron toward Chicago	Broadway Limited 1990–1995	Pittsburgh toward New York
Preceding station	Baltimore and Ohio Railroad	Following station
Akron–Union toward Chicago	Main Line	Mars toward Jersey City
Newton Falls toward Chicago	Main Line	Lowellville toward Jersey City
- Baltimore & Ohio Railroad Terminal
- U.S. National Register of Historic Places
- Architectural style: Colonial Revival
- NRHP reference No.: 86001565
- Added to NRHP: July 10, 1986
Location

Youngstown station is a former passenger railroad station in Youngstown, Ohio. The station is on the ex Baltimore and Ohio Railroad, and was a B&O passenger station for most of the twentieth century. The station was built in 1905 and operated as a passenger station until 1971, when the B&O yielded passenger train service to Amtrak. It was later a passenger station for Amtrak through the 1990s and early 2000s.

== History ==
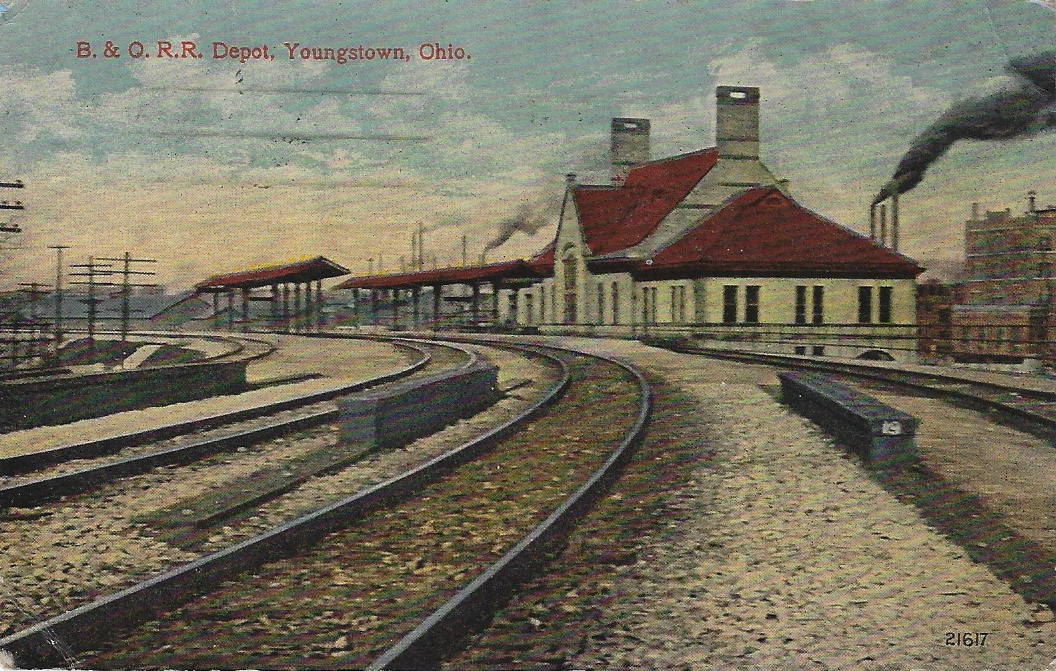
Youngstown station in the late 1910s, as it appeared for most its decades of operation, with tracks raised to level of second floor, following 1913 Mahoning River flood.

The station was built in 1905 at the cost of $70,000. It was located on the southern banks of the Mahoning River. This was in contrast to competing stations of the Erie, New York Central and Pennsylvania railroads located in the city's downtown. The B&O raised the railroad tracks to the level of the building's second floor after river flooding of the area, which reached an epic level in March 1913. In 1926 the company added a freight house.

=== Passenger trains ===
The B&O's famed Capitol Limited ran through the city, but it did not stop there until later years. Noted passenger trains at 1956 included:

- Ambassador – Detroit–Baltimore
- Cleveland Night Express – Cleveland–Baltimore
- Washingtonian – Cleveland–Baltimore
- Columbian – Chicago–Washington, D.C.
- Shenandoah – Chicago–Jersey City

=== Declining years ===
The B&O terminated several trains running through Youngstown over the course of the 1960s. By 1964, the B&O had eliminated the trains to Cleveland. Detroit-bound travelers would need to transfer at Deshler for the Cincinnatian or the Night Express to Detroit.

The B&O in 1964 changed the Capitol Limited to the Capitol. The renamed train began stopping at intermediate stations such as Youngstown. By 1965, only this station and the Erie station on West Commerce Street remained as passenger stations in Youngstown.

In the station's final years the station was serving the Capitol Limited (name restored) and an unnamed day train from Akron to Washington. In 1971 Amtrak took over passenger train operations from the Baltimore & Ohio and this marked the end of passenger trains at the Youngstown station. All remaining rail traffic was strictly freight oriented.

=== Amtrak ===
In the mid-1980s the city bought the station building, amidst anticipation that the building would be demolished. In 1991 a restaurant took over the location. From 1990 to 1995 the station served Amtrak's Broadway Limited (Chicago-New York). It was replaced in 1997 with the Three Rivers, which served Youngstown until its 2005 discontinuance.
