= Strata-Dome =

Class of 2 coach-dome cars and 3 sleeper-dome cars

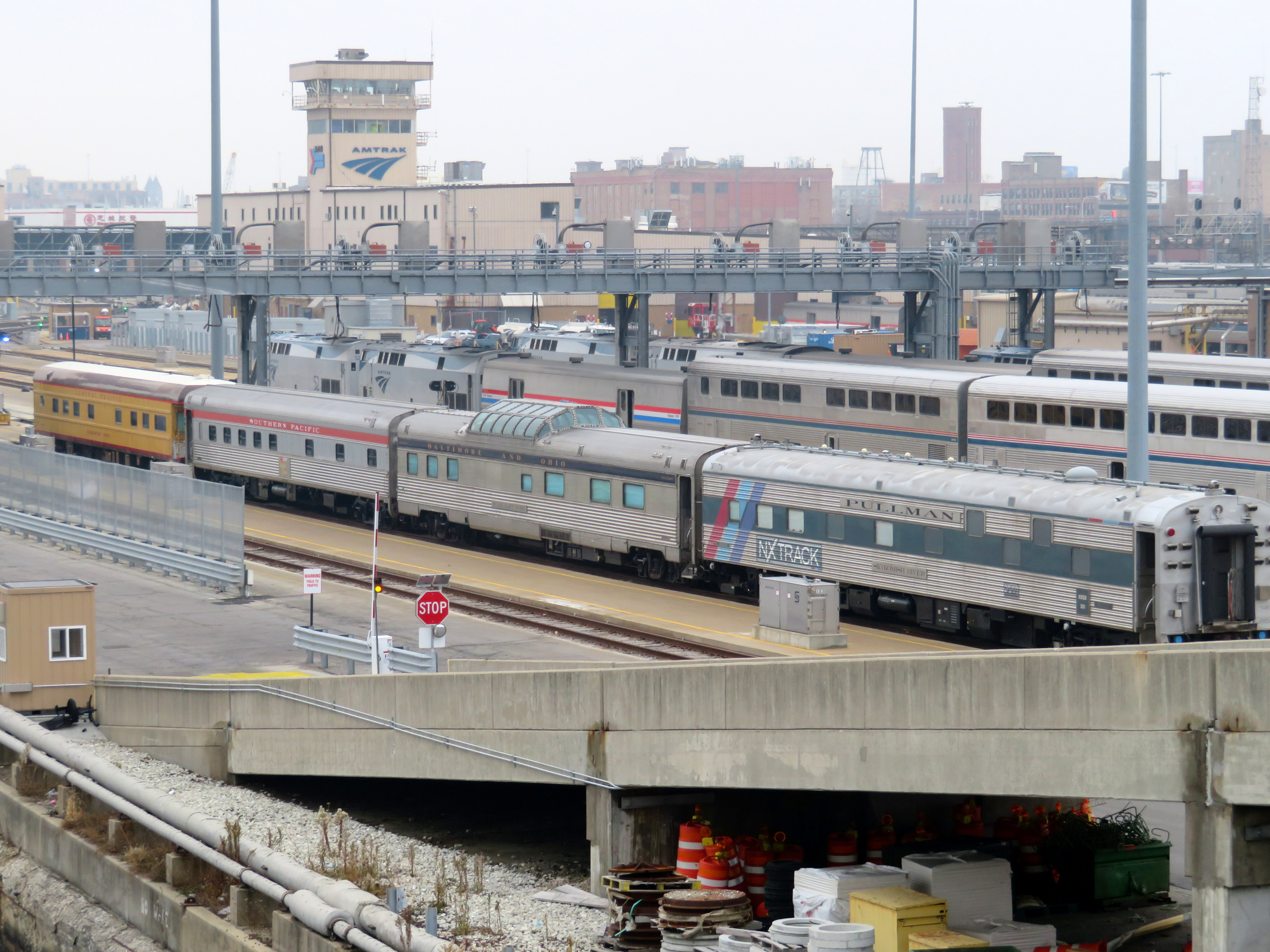
- Strata-Dome Moonlight Dome

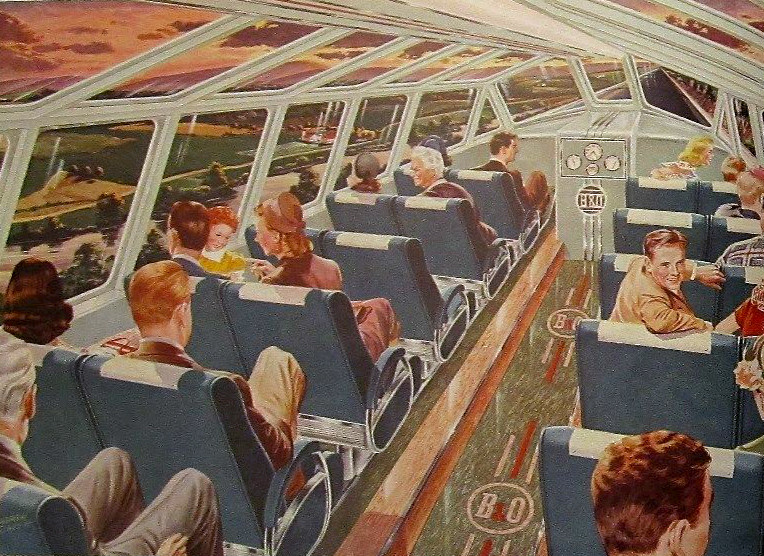
- Interior of one of the Pullman-built Strata-Domes. Note the instrument panel at the front.
- In service: 1949–1981
- Manufacturers: Pullman-Standard; Budd Company
- Number built: 5
- Operators: Baltimore and Ohio Railroad (1949-1971) Seaboard Coast Line Railroad (1969-1971) Amtrak (1971-1981)

The Strata-Domes were a fleet of five streamlined dome cars operated by the Baltimore and Ohio Railroad ("B&O"). The term referred both to a pair of dome cars constructed by Pullman-Standard and three Budd Company domes the B&O acquired from the Chesapeake and Ohio Railway ("C&O"). They were the first dome cars operated in the Eastern United States, following on the success of the Chicago, Burlington and Quincy Railroad's "Vista-Domes" in the west. The cars entered service in 1949 and were all out of regular service by 1981. Several have been preserved.

== Design ==
Pullman-Standard built the two original Strata-Domes. The dome area seated 24, while the lower level contained two lounges and coach seating for 42. To accommodate the lower clearances on railroads in the Eastern United States the dome sat lower on the Strata Dome than on other dome cars, 21 inches (530 mm) instead of the standard 28 inches (710 mm). These cars were numbered 5550 and 5551 and given the names High Dome and Sky Dome. At the front of the car the B&O installed a speedometer, clock, altimeter, and barometer.

In December 1950 the B&O acquired three dome-sleepers from the C&O. The Budd Company had built these cars for the Chessie, a Washington, D.C.–Cincinnati, Ohio luxury streamliner which was cancelled before it entered service. Each of these had 24 dome seats, with 3 drawing rooms, 5 roomettes, 1 bedroom in the lower level. The B&O numbered these 7600–7602, with the names Moonlight Dome, Starlight Dome, and Sunlight Dome.

In 1952 the B&O mounted floodlights on the Strata-Domes to enable viewing the passing scenery at night.

== Service history ==
The two original Strata-Domes entered service on the new Columbian, which debuted on May 5, 1949. They were the first domes in regular service on the East Coast. The B&O placed the acquired C&O dome-sleepers on the Capitol Limited and Shenandoah. Contemporary advertising referred to "Strata-Dome" service on all three services, despite the mixed origin of the equipment.

In the 1960s the B&O would occasionally lease the three Budd-built dome-sleepers to other railroads, including the Atlantic Coast Line Railroad, Canadian National Railway, and Seaboard Coast Line Railroad. The Atlantic Coast Line used the domes on its Florida Special, although operation was limited to Richmond, Virginia–Miami, Florida because of tunnel clearances in Washington. They were the first domes to operate on the Florida route. The Seaboard Coast Line, successor to the Atlantic Coast Line, purchased the three domes from the B&O (along with eight conventional sleeping cars) in September 1969. The domes returned to the Florida Special.

The B&O modified the two dome coaches to include a snack bar in one of the lower-level lounges. The two cars also operated on other B&O trains such as the Cincinnatian. The High Dome, painted blue and lettered "American Railroads 1869–1969", was part of the 1969 Golden Spike Centennial Limited to mark the centennial of the first transcontinental railroad in the U.S. Both cars later ran on the final Capitol Limited run April 30, 1971 when the train was discontinued at the start of Amtrak.

Amtrak acquired all five domes and operated them on various services in the 1970s. High Dome was wrecked in 1975 and scrapped in 1980. Amtrak retired its last, Starlight Dome, in October 1981. The three surviving domes are privately owned.
