= Ambassador (B&O train) =

American passenger train

Overview
- First service: 1930
- Last service: 1964
- Former operator(s): Baltimore and Ohio Railroad

Route
- Termini: Baltimore, Maryland; Detroit, Michigan
- Stops: 17 (incl. Washington, D.C., Pittsburgh, and Toledo)
- Distance travelled: 697.5 miles (1,122.5 km)
- Average journey time: 16 hours
- Service frequency: Daily
- Train number(s): 19, 20

On-board services
- Seating arrangements: Coach
- Sleeping arrangements: Roomette and double bedroom
- Catering facilities: Dining car (Washington to Detroit)

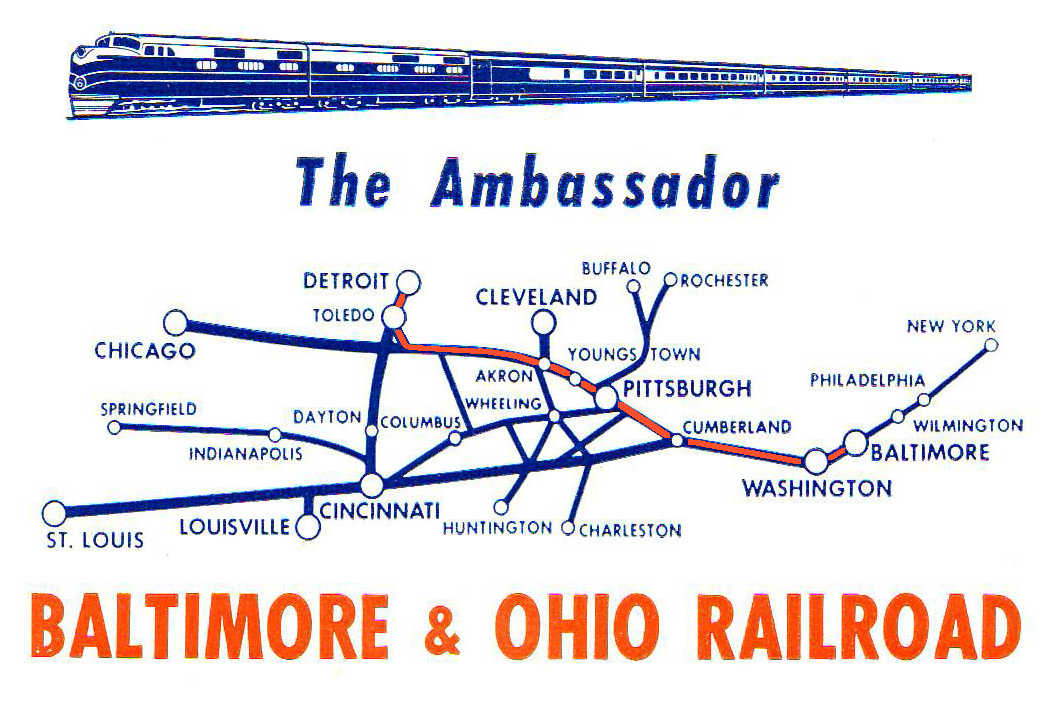
The route of the Ambassador (in orange)

The Ambassador was a named train of the Baltimore and Ohio Railroad (B&O) on its route between Baltimore, Maryland and Detroit, Michigan with major station stops in Washington, D.C., and Pittsburgh, Pennsylvania, and Toledo, Ohio. Inaugurated in 1930, the Ambassador was discontinued in 1964.

== History ==
The B&O began passenger service from Detroit to Washington, D.C., in 1920. From Detroit to Toledo, it ran on the tracks of the Pere Marquette and Wabash railroads. Toledo south to Deshler, it ran on B&O tracks. Until 1925, the B&O offered a through Washington to Detroit Pullman sleeping car running on a Washington to Chicago train. At Deshler, Ohio, the car was added to a Cincinnati to Detroit train.

In June 1925, the B&O started a through direct from Washington overnight train to Detroit named the Washington-Detroit Limited (although it actually originated in Baltimore). This train operated coaches, a dining car, a lounge car, and sleepers. In 1930, this train was renamed The Ambassador. The train typically used the cutoff through North Baltimore, Ohio, skipping Deshler. Up through 1946, it operated into Fort Street Union Depot in Detroit, then B&O moved operations to the landmark Michigan Central Station.

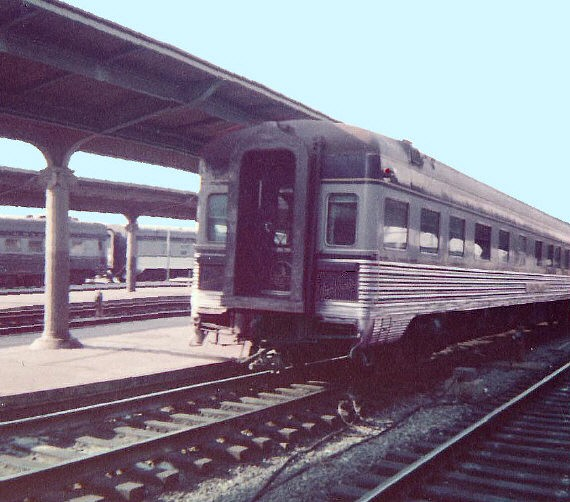
The observation car bringing up the rear of the westbound Ambassador, departing Union Station (Washington, D.C.) in June, 1961, shortly before it ceased running as a separate train

In late 1961, as railroad passenger traffic was declining, The Ambassador became just a section of the combined Capitol Limited - Columbian. It had one coach, a sleeping car, and a combination sleeper-lounge. The train operated separately from Willard, Ohio, to Detroit with a dining car added.

In 1964, The Ambassador name disappeared entirely, and the train was renamed the Capitol-Detroit. Now that the Chesapeake and Ohio Railway had acquired control of the B&O, the train was rerouted over the C&O from Toledo to Fort Street Union Depot.

== Notable incidents ==
On September 24, 1942, The Ambassador ran into the back of the Cleveland Express near Dickerson, Maryland northwest of Washington, D.C. Twelve passengers and two crewmen were killed in the worst accident that the B&O had suffered since 1907.

On the night of March 9, 1949, as the Ambassador was leaving Martinsburg, West Virginia, two young men riding on the train as passengers began robbing other passengers, then walked through the train and its diesel locomotives to the head end and forced the engineer to back the train back to a grade crossing, where they got off. The robbers then held up a nearby tavern, stole a car, and later caught a bus, winding up in Washington, D.C, the next day. Police, acting on a tip, arrested the two at a pawn shop, wounding one bandit who officers thought was drawing a gun (instead only reaching for an ID). The story made national headlines, and the pair were subsequently sentenced to twenty years in federal prison. Firsthand account from the head bandit, Luman Ramsdell, in book by author Wilson Casey, "Bedlam on the West Virginia Rails", 2015 History Press.

== Stations ==
Station	State
Baltimore (Camden Station)	Maryland
Washington (Washington Union Station)	District of Columbia
Martinsburg (Martinsburg station)	West Virginia
Cumberland (Queen City Station)	Maryland
Pittsburgh (Pittsburgh & Lake Erie Railroad Station)	Pennsylvania
Youngstown (Youngstown station)	Ohio
Akron (Union Station (Akron, Ohio))	Ohio
Willard	Ohio
Toledo (Union Station)	Ohio
Detroit (Michigan Central Station)	Michigan
