= Shenandoah (B&O train) =

- B&O Train # 8, the Shenandoah, along the Potomac River near Hansrote, West Virginia, on October 30, 1952

Overview
- Service type: Inter-city rail
- Status: Discontinued
- Locale: Mid-Atlantic United States; Midwestern United States
- First service: 1937
- Last service: 1964
- Successor: Shenandoah (Amtrak)
- Former operator: Baltimore & Ohio Railroad

Route
- Termini: Jersey City, New Jersey; Baltimore, Maryland, 1958–1971; Chicago, Illinois, second branch to Detroit, Michigan
- Distance travelled: 1,001 miles (1,611 km) (1948)
- Average journey time: 20 Hours, 55 minutes (1948); 17 hours, 45 minutes (1961)
- Service frequency: Daily

On-board services
- Seating arrangements: Coaches
- Sleeping arrangements: Roomettes, Double Bedrooms, Sections; Roomettes, Bedroom, single person Drawing Rooms on lower level of the Strata-Dome; car with Roomettes & Double Bedrooms continuous Washington to Los Angeles, from Chicago on Santa Fe Railway's #17, Super Chief (return trip available on B&O's Capitol Limited (1957)
- Catering facilities: Dining cars
- Observation facilities: Lounge car Strata-Dome (on odd days, except the 31st)

Technical
- Operating speed: 47.9 mph (77.1 km/h) (average, 1948)

The Shenandoah was an American named passenger train of the Baltimore and Ohio Railroad (B&O), one of four daily B&O trains operating between Jersey City, New Jersey and Grand Central Station in Chicago, Illinois, via Washington, D.C., and Pittsburgh, Pennsylvania from the 1930s to the 1950s. Other B&O trains of that period on the route were the Capitol Limited, Columbian, and the Washington–Chicago Express. An alternate branch originated in Detroit and met with the Chicago part of the train at Deshler, Ohio, south of Toledo.

While the trains were advertised as beginning in New York City, they actually began in Jersey City at the Jersey Central's Jersey City terminal, where passengers were then transferred to buses that met the train right on the platform. These buses were ferried across the Hudson River into Manhattan, where they proceeded to various "stations." The Shenandoah operated to New York City via Philadelphia, Pennsylvania, until April 26, 1958, when the B&O discontinued passenger service north of Baltimore.

From the 1940s to the 1960s, the daily Shenandoah consisted of coaches, five Pullman sleeping cars, a lounge car with a radio, and a full-service dining car. Beginning in the early 1950s, the train also had a Strata-Dome combination sleeper-dome car on alternate days.

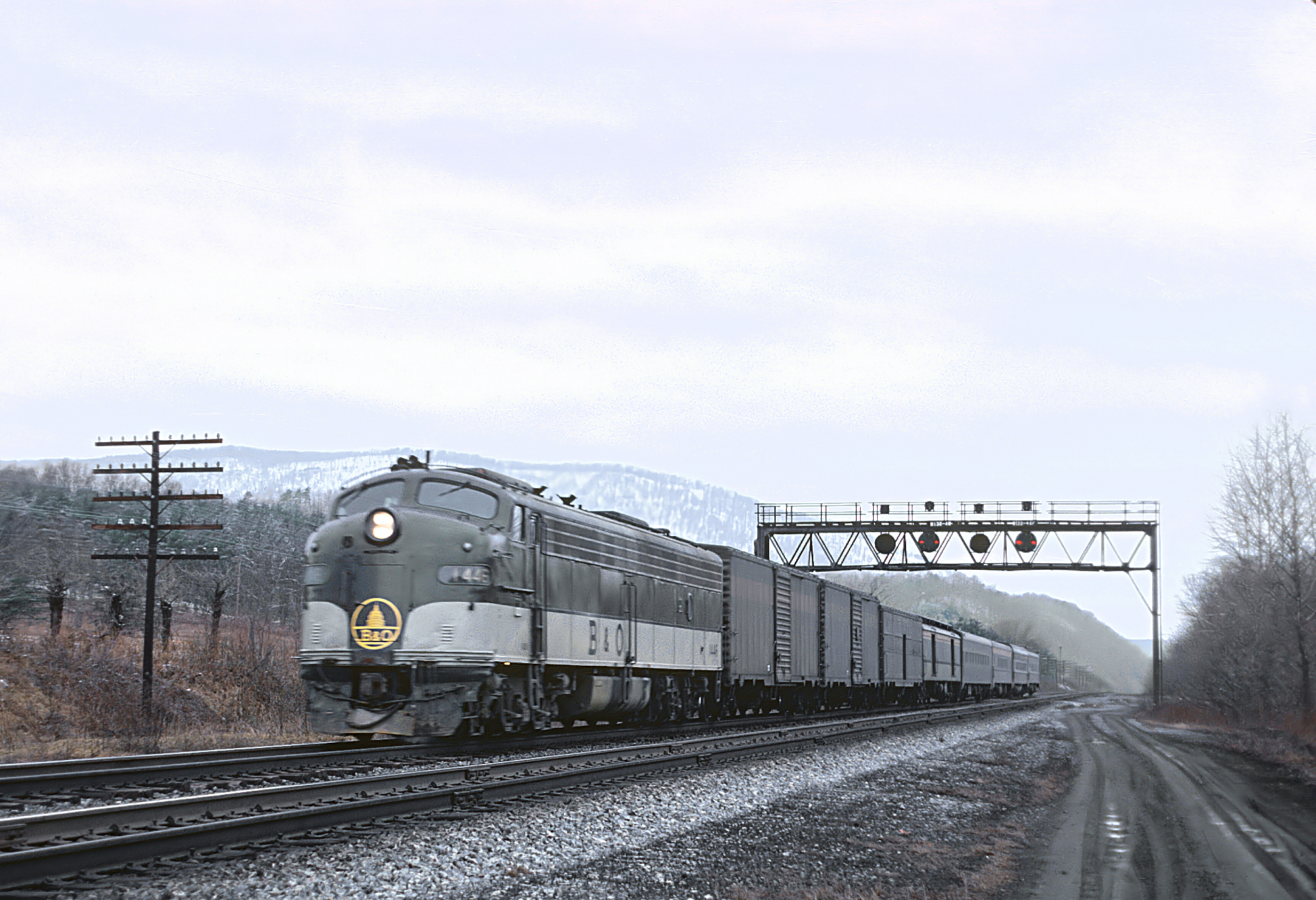
B&O E8A 1445 with train #8, the eastbound Shenandoah, at Great Cacapon, West Virginia on March 2, 1969

The westbound Shenandoah, operating as Train #7, left Washington at 11:30 p.m. (several hours after the 5 p.m. departure of the Capitol Limited and Columbian from the nation's capital), making it a favorite of travelers seeking convenient connections with other railroads in Chicago, including the streamliners of the Santa Fe and Union Pacific Railroads. The train also carried a heavy volume of mail and express, with "head-end" equipment such as Railway Post Office cars a regular part of the Shenandoah's consist. Beginning on January 16, 1954, the train included a transcontinental sleeping car from Washington, continuing past Chicago on the Santa Fe Railway's Super Chief. (For the eastbound trip this was carried on the Capitol Limited.) On January 12, 1958, the Baltimore & Ohio terminated the transcontinental sleeper car.

As passenger patronage on American railroads continued to decline in the 1960s, the combination sleeper-dome and dining cars were dropped, and Trains No. 7–8 were renamed the Diplomat in 1964 and then dropped altogether in 1967. It had its final run in a truncated Akron, Ohio to Washington, D.C., itinerary with the end of B&O passenger service on April 30, 1971.

Amtrak revived the name in the 1970s for the short-lived Shenandoah, a Washington–Cincinnati train.

== Schedule ==
In 1961, westbound Shenandoah Train No. 7 operated on the following schedule (departure times at principal stops shown):

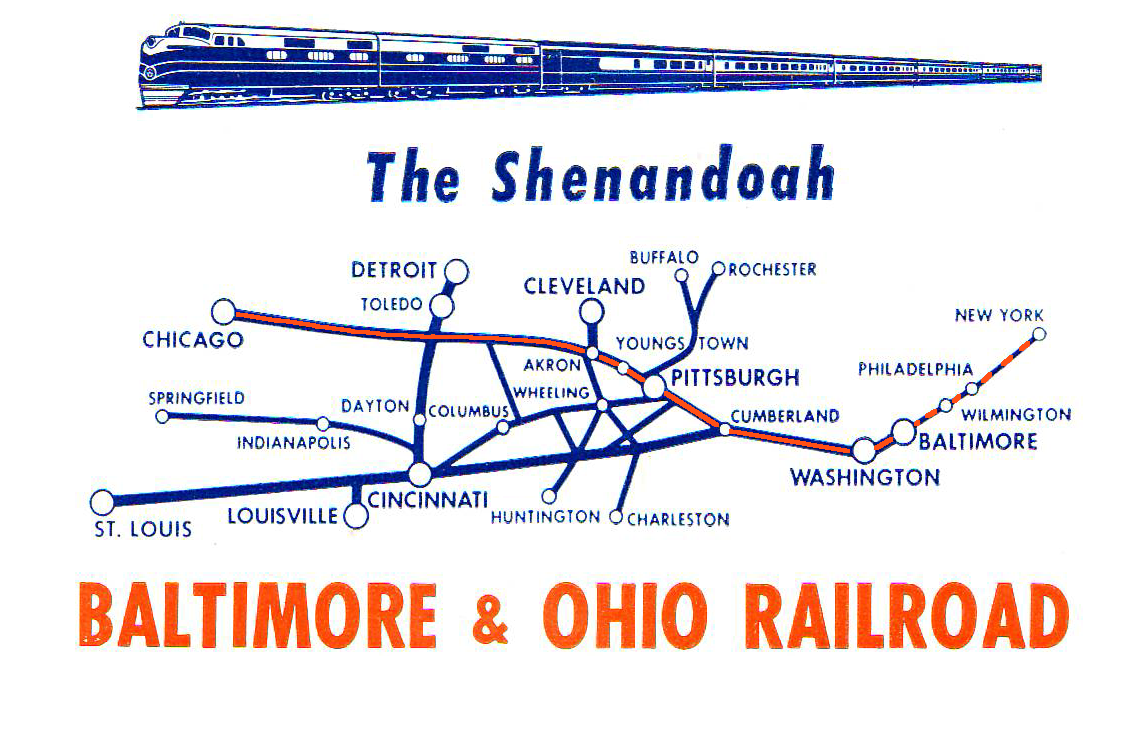
The route of the Shenandoah (in orange)

City	Departure time
Baltimore, Md. (Camden Station)	10:00 p.m.
Washington, D.C. (Union Station)	11:15 p.m.
Martinsburg, W. Va. (Martinsburg Station)	12:56 a.m.
Cumberland, Md. (Queen City Station)	2:47 a.m.
Connellsville, Pa.	5:10 a.m.
McKeesport, Pa.	6:08 a.m.
Pittsburgh, Pa. (P&L.E. Station)	7:00 a.m.
New Castle, Pa.	8:07 a.m.
Youngstown, Ohio (B&O Station)	8:36 a.m.
Akron, Ohio (Union Station)	9:52 a.m.
Deshler, Ohio	11:35 a.m.
Gary, Indiana (CT) (Union Station)	2:38 p.m.
South Chicago (South Chicago)	2:51 p.m.
Chicago (Grand Central Station)	3:45 p.m.
source: B&O timetable, October 29, 1961
