= Capitol Limited (B&O train) =

Former B&O train between New York and Chicago

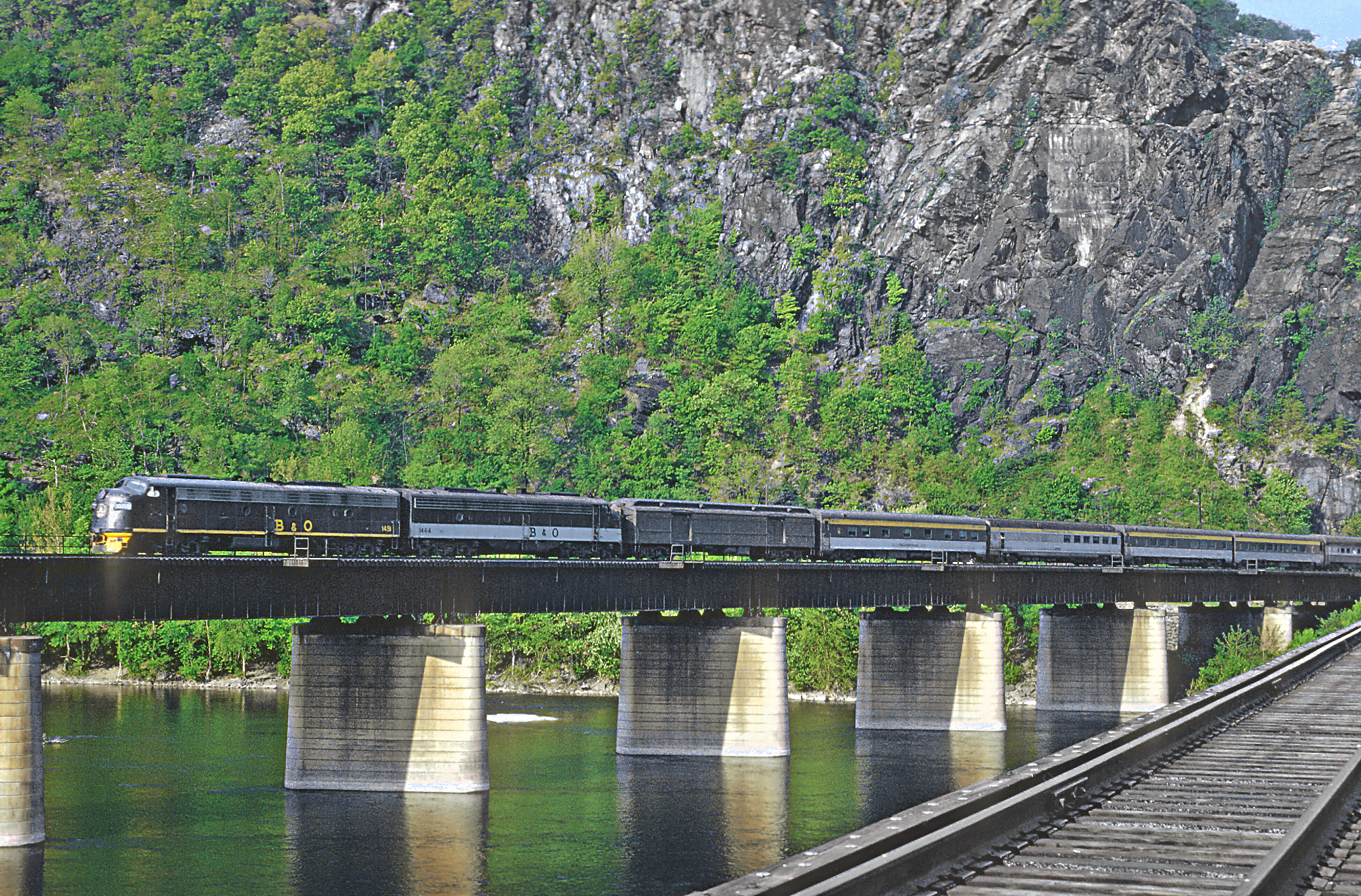
- The westbound Capitol Limited crossing the Potomac River at Harpers Ferry, West Virginia in 1969

Overview
- Service type: Inter-city rail
- Status: Discontinued
- Locale: Eastern United States
- First service: May 12, 1923
- Last service: April 30, 1971
- Successor: Capitol Limited (Amtrak)
- Former operator: Baltimore and Ohio Railroad

Route
- Termini: Baltimore, Maryland (1958); Chicago, Illinois
- Stops: 23 (Baltimore - Chicago); 21 (Chicago - Baltimore)
- Average journey time: 18 hours, 40 minutes (Baltimore - Chicago); 18 hours, 15 minutes (Chicago - Baltimore)
- Service frequency: Daily
- Train numbers: 105-5 (Baltimore - Chicago); 6-106 (Chicago - Baltimore)

On-board services
- Seating arrangements: Lounge Seating Rooms
- Sleeping arrangements: Roomettes; Double Bedrooms; Bedroom Suites
- Catering facilities: Lounge; Magazine Library
- Baggage facilities: Limited Baggage Service

Technical
- Rolling stock: Strata-Dome
- Track gauge: 1,435 mm (4 ft 8 1/2 in)
- Operating speed: 43.2 (Baltimore - Chicago); 44.2 (Chicago - Baltimore)
Route map
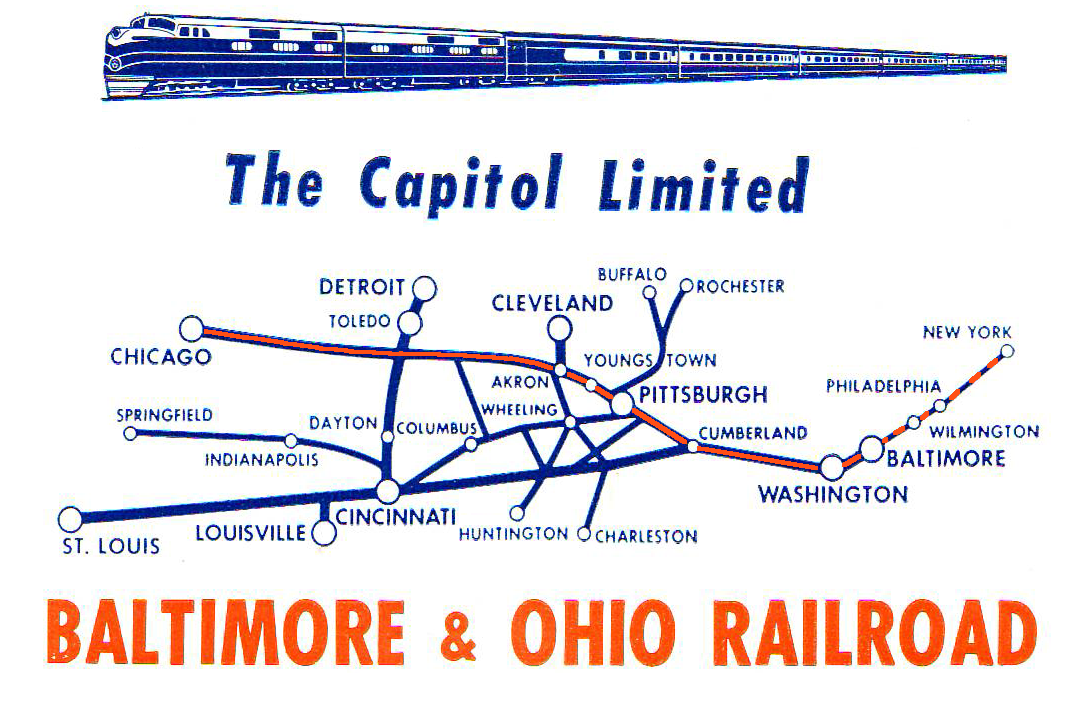

The Capitol Limited was an American passenger train run by the Baltimore and Ohio Railroad, originally between New York City and Grand Central Station in Chicago, via Washington Union Station in Washington, D.C., Camden Station in Baltimore, and Pittsburgh. For almost 48 years, it was the B&O's flagship passenger train, noted for personalized service and innovation. At the time of its discontinuation on May 1, 1971, when Amtrak took over most rail passenger service in the U.S., the Capitol Limited operated between Washington and Chicago.

== History ==
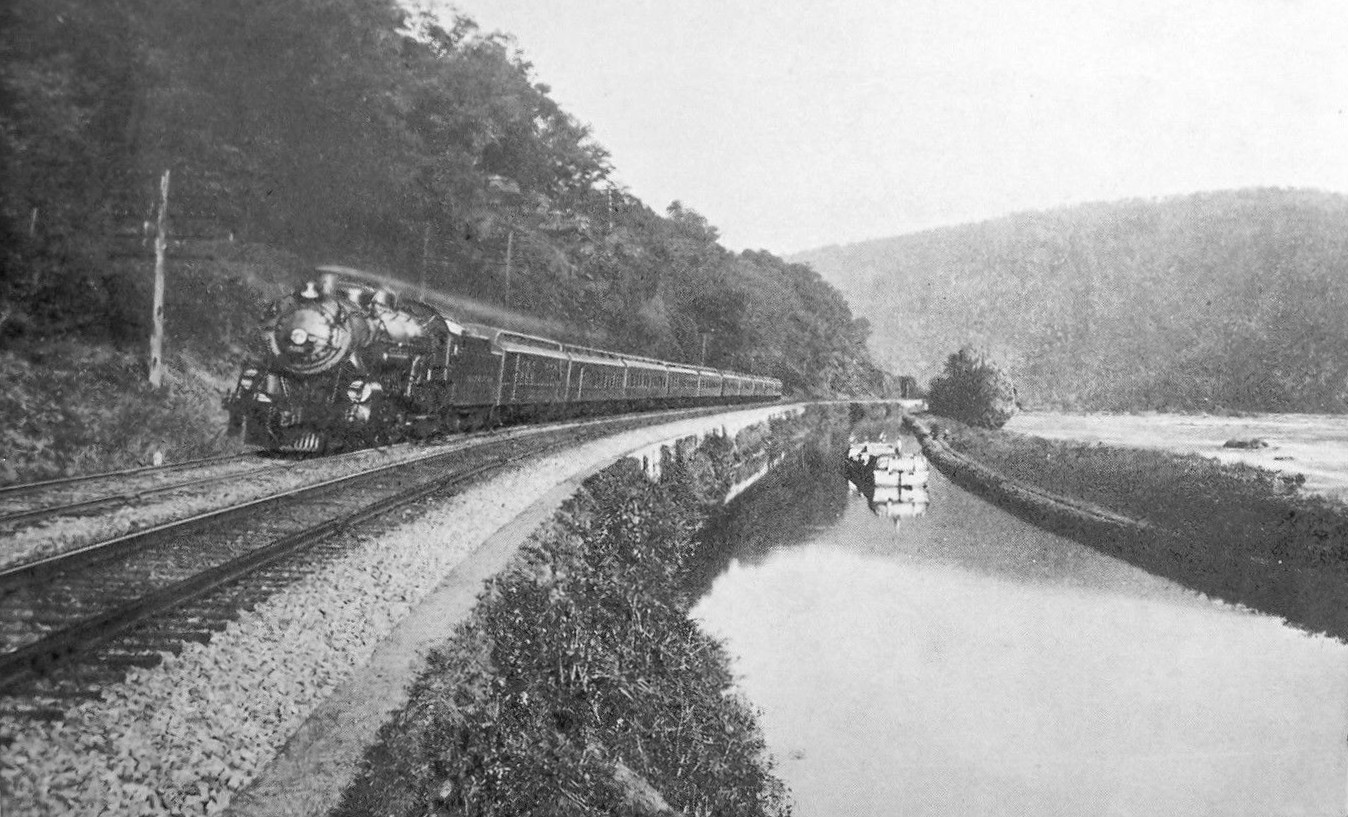
The Capitol Limited in its early years

The Capitol Limited was inaugurated on May 12, 1923, as an all-Pullman sleeping car train running from Pennsylvania Station in New York City to Chicago, via Washington, D.C. Once west of the Pennsy's Newark station in New Jersey, the train used the Lehigh Valley and Reading Railroad as far as Philadelphia, where it reached B&O's own rails to Chicago. It was designed to compete against the luxury trains of the rival Pennsylvania Railroad and New York Central Railroad. Although the B&O's longer route put it at a competitive disadvantage in New York for time-sensitive travelers, the B&O offered such luxuries in the 1920s as onboard secretaries, barbers, manicures, and valets. The Capitol's "Martha Washington"-series dining cars were particularly noted for their Chesapeake Bay cuisine, served in ornate cars with leaded glass windows, glass chandeliers and colonial-style furnishings. The Capitol Limited derived much of its passenger traffic from businessmen and government officials traveling between Washington and the midwest.

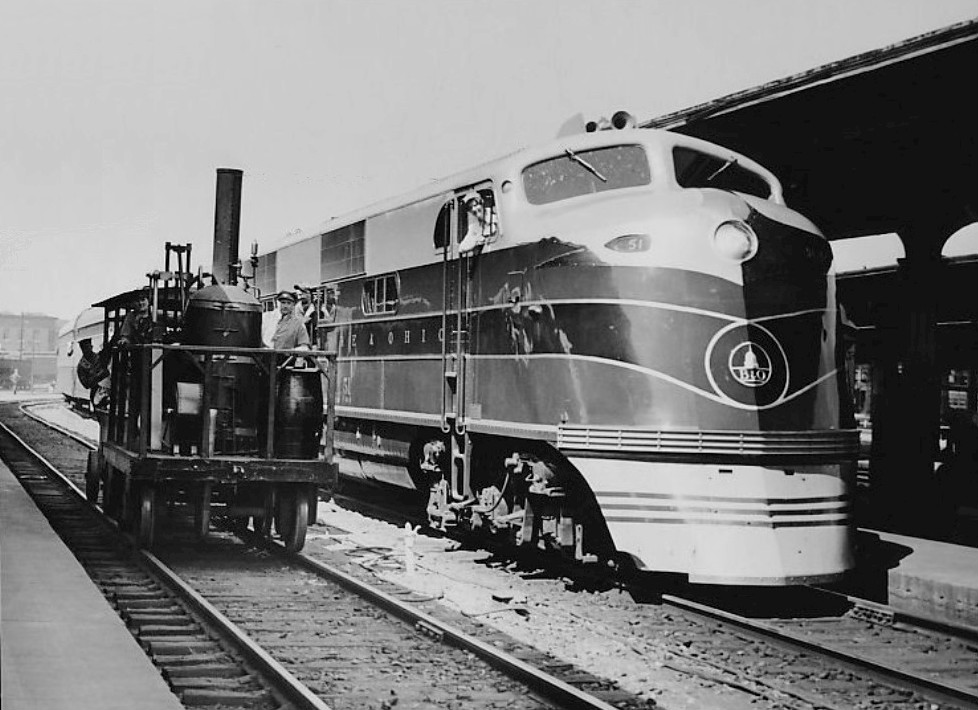
Brand-new diesel equipment in 1937

On September 1, 1926, the Pennsylvania Railroad terminated its contract with the B&O, which had permitted the latter to use the "Pennsy's" Hudson River tunnels and Pennsylvania Station in Manhattan. Thereafter, the Capitol Limited, along with all other B&O passenger trains to New York, operated over the Jersey Central's main line from the connection with the Reading in Bound Brook into its Jersey City terminal, where passengers were then transferred to buses that met the train right on the platform. These buses were ferried across the Hudson River into Manhattan, where they proceeded to various "stations" including the Vanderbilt Hotel, Wanamaker's, Columbus Circle and Rockefeller Center, as well as Brooklyn.

In 1938, the B&O dieselized the train after purchasing two sets of the new EA and EB locomotives from General Motors' Electro-Motive Corporation. The B&O was heavily in debt during the Depression and could not afford to buy new equipment, so it rebuilt its old heavyweight passenger cars into streamlined ones when the diesels were introduced in 1938, making the Capitol Limited the first dieselized streamlined train in the eastern U.S. By September 1940, the through sleeping cars operating to New York were all streamlined. For the aesthetic features of the train, the B&O turned to renowned industrial designer Otto Kuhler, who turned the Cap, as it was affectionately known, into a regal operation complete with a stunning royal blue, silver, and gold pin-striping livery (a paint scheme that would become one of the classics of the streamliner era).

== Route and equipment ==
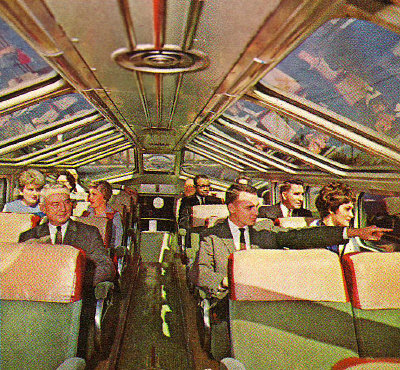
Dome car on the Capitol Limited

Following World War II, the B&O and the Santa Fe railway launched through sleeping car service between Washington, D.C., and Los Angeles on the Capitol Limited and the Santa Fe's Chief. In 1954 these continuous trains were offered only eastbound on the Capitol Limited. For the westbound trip, passengers would take the B&O's Shenandoah for a continuous ride from the eastern cities. Additionally, for the Santa Fe segment from Chicago to Los Angeles and the reverse, the train was shifted from the Chief to the SF's Super Chief. In February, 1956, the Capitol Limited departed Jersey City at 12:45 p.m. as train # 5. As an express, all-Pullman sleeping car train, the Capitol Limited made limited stops along its 991-mile (1,595 km) route to Chicago. This all-Pullman configuration allowed passengers to avoid the process of transferring between the B&O's Grand Central Station and Dearborn Station, where the Santa Fe's trains departed from.

Eastbound, the train departed Chicago at 4:30 p.m. as train # 6. This scheduled departure was timed so that travelers riding western railroads such as the Santa Fe, Chicago and North Western Railway or the Burlington could readily connect for an eastward journey on B&O's deluxe train. During the height of train travel in the 1920s, the Capitol Limited occasionally ran in multiple sections, although never as frequently or extensively as the competing Pennsylvania Railroad's Broadway Limited and New York Central Railroad's 20th Century Limited.

The B&O was the first railroad to introduce air conditioning on its trains, beginning with the Columbian in 1931, followed by the Capitol Limited on May 22, 1932, well ahead of its competitors. This innovation received favorable comment nationwide by the news media.

The Capitol Limited received streamlined heavyweight sleeping and dining cars in 1938. A typical consist included the following: baggage-dormitory, 8-section 1-drawing room 1-compartment sleeping car, dining car, three to four 8-section 5-double bedroom sleeping cars, 14-section sleeping car, two 12-section 1-drawing room sleeping cars, and a sleeper-buffet-lounge with a drawing room and three compartments. In 1941 these cars were augmented by several lightweight 10-roomette 5-bedroom sleeping cars.

By the early 1950s, the B&O had combined through cars for the Capitol Limited, the Columbian (# 25), and the Ambassador (# 19) into one train between New York and Washington. Beyond Washington, the three trains then operated separately, with several additional Washington-to-Chicago Pullman sleeping cars added to the Capitol Limited, along with a twin-unit dining car, two Strata-Dome dome cars, club car, and a flat-end observation car.

The B&O re-equipped the Capitol Limited with new, streamlined sleeping cars in 1950 and 1954, including the new duplex-roomette type. The Pullmans were named after rivers and lakes along the train's route, such as "Cacapon" and "Wawasee". Dome cars "Moonlight Dome" and "Starlight Dome", having sleeping compartments on their lower levels, were added on January 8, 1951. A twin-unit dining car seating 64 passengers at a time was obtained from the New York Central in 1957.

== Discontinuance ==
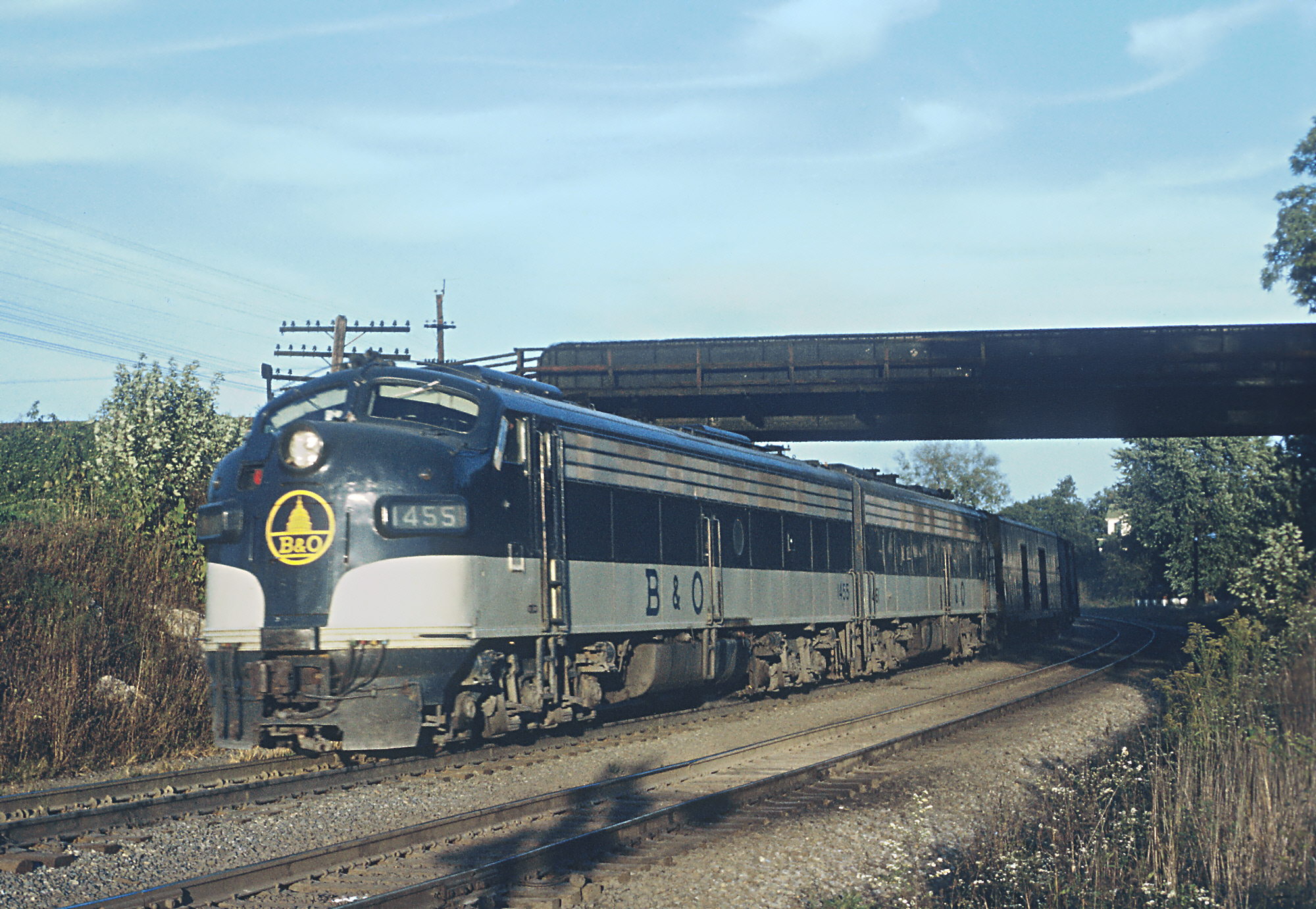
The Capitol Limited in October 1970

The Capitol Limited, in common with most name trains in the U.S. by the mid-1950s, suffered steadily-declining patronage as the traveling public abandoned trains in favor of airplanes and the automobile. The B&O gave up on competing with the Pennsylvania Railroad into New York, discontinuing all passenger service north of Baltimore on April 26, 1958. Also, on January 16 of that year, the B&O and the Santa Fe discontinued the Los Angeles-Washington sleeper. With the April 26 schedule, the Capitol Limited operated between Washington and Chicago as a through train, with a few cars originating in Baltimore until 1966. Other B&O passenger trains were combined with the Capitol Limited: the Ambassador to Detroit and the formerly all-coach Columbian to Chicago. The combined train in the early 1960s had as many as 22 cars pulled by five locomotives.

To stem the loss of passengers and resulting deficits, the B&O in the early 1960s offered reduced mid-week fares, auto shipment for passengers (similar in concept to the Auto Train), and onboard movies, to attract more passengers. The train was marginally-profitable, when mail and express revenue was included.

While the train began 1964 as the Capitol Limited, by the year's end it was changed to the Capitol. The renamed train began stopping in both directions at intermediate stations such as Akron Union Station and Youngstown Station. (The B&O restored the Limited part of the name by 1967, but kept the stops at intermediate stations.)

The loss in 1967 of mail and express contracts, which by then accounted for almost 70 percent of passenger train revenue for the B&O, severely affected the B&O's passenger service. The Post Office Department's cancellation of its mail contract for the Capitol Limited and other trains, on October 28, 1967, was the death knell. Many passenger trains were dropped and the consist of the Capitol Limited was considerably-reduced. B&O discontinued all long-distance train service to Baltimore's Camden Station. Between October 1966 and April 1971, a connecting RDC operated between Baltimore and Washington, D.C., as train # 105. By June, 1969, two E diesel electric engines pulled a train consisting of one baggage car, sleeper (10/6), one diner / lounge, one dome coach, and four coaches. Additionally, by that year, with the cancellation of the Washington-Chicago Express, the Capitol Limited became the B&O's only Washington - Chicago train.

With the advent of Amtrak on May 1, 1971, the Capitol Limited was discontinued by the B&O, along with all of its other passenger trains save local commuter services. For the final run of the old Capitol Limited on April 29, 1971, the B&O ran the entire trainset from Baltimore's Camden Station, including the dome car. The B&O printed special commemorative tickets and returned its bottled Deer Park spring water and B&O's signature, "all-you-can-eat" giant salad bowls to the final run's dining car, some of the Capitol Limited's amenities from more prosperous times. A 31-year veteran dining car waiter on the last run of the Capitol Limited recalled to a reporter for The Baltimore Sun that, "all the vegetables we served were freshly cooked on board—no frozen or canned food at all."

At its inception, Amtrak did not continue any of the B&O's former passenger train routes, and the Capitol Limited ended its 48-year run on the B&O. After a lapse of ten years, Amtrak revived Washington–Chicago service, using the same B&O tracks (now CSX Transportation) between Washington and Pittsburgh, Pennsylvania, for the Amtrak Capitol Limited.
