= Grand Central Station (Chicago) =

Train station in Chicago (1890–1969)

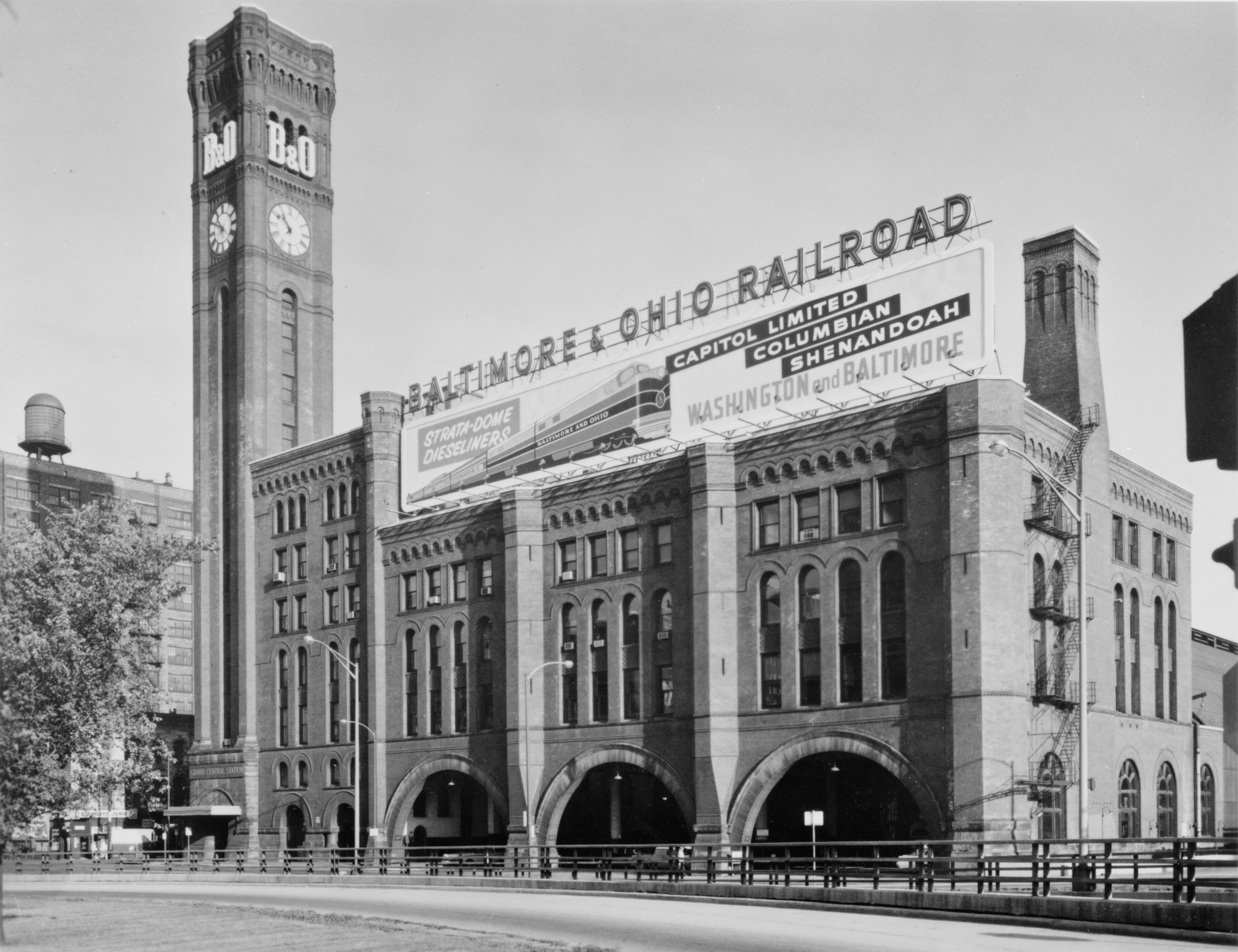
- Grand Central in 1963

General information
- Location: 201 West Harrison Street, Chicago, Illinois
- Coordinates: 41°52′24″N 87°38′03″W
- Owner: Baltimore and Ohio Railroad

History
- Opened: December 8, 1890
- Closed: November 8, 1969

Services
Preceding station	Baltimore and Ohio Railroad	Following station
Terminus	Main Line	Gary toward Jersey City
Terminus	Main Line	63rd Street toward Jersey City
Preceding station	Chesapeake and Ohio Railway	Following station
Terminus	Pere Marquette Railway; Main Line	63rd Street toward Grand Rapids
Preceding station	Chicago Great Western Railway	Following station
Forest Park toward Omaha	Omaha – Chicago	Terminus
Preceding station	Soo Line	Following station
Forest Park toward Portal	Main Line	Terminus
Preceding station	Chicago Terminal Transfer Railroad	Following station
Halsted Street toward Chicago Heights	Suburban service	Terminus
Halsted Street toward Thatcher's Park	Chicago & Northern Pacific – Main Line	Terminus
Halsted Street toward Cemetaries	Chicago & Northern Pacific – Harlem Division	Terminus
Abandoned service proposal
Preceding station	Milwaukee Road	Following station
Harvey toward Westport	Terre Haute Division	Terminus
- Grand Central Passenger Station
- Formerly listed on the U.S. National Register of Historic Places
- Interactive map of Grand Central Passenger Station
- Built: 1890
- Demolished: 1971
- NRHP reference No.: 71001084

Significant dates
- Added to NRHP: June 3, 1971
- Removed from NRHP: October 28, 1971
Location

Grand Central Station was a passenger railroad terminal in downtown Chicago, Illinois, from 1890 to 1969. It was located at 201 West Harrison Street on a block bounded by Harrison, Wells and Polk Streets and the Chicago River in the southwestern portion of the Chicago Loop. Grand Central Station was designed by architect Solon Spencer Beman for the Wisconsin Central Railroad (WC), and was completed by the Chicago and Northern Pacific Railroad.

The Baltimore and Ohio Railroad purchased the station in 1910 and used it as the Chicago terminus for its passenger rail service, including its Capitol Limited service to Washington, D.C. Major tenant railroads included the Soo Line Railroad, successor to the Wisconsin Central, the Chicago Great Western Railway, and the Pere Marquette Railway. The station opened December 8, 1890, closed November 8, 1969, and was demolished in 1971.

== Construction ==
In October 1889, a subsidiary of the Wisconsin Central Railroad began constructing a new passenger terminal at the southwest corner of Harrison and Wells Streets (then called Fifth Avenue) in Chicago, to replace a nearby temporary facility. The location of this new depot, along the south branch of the Chicago River, was selected to take advantage of the bustling passenger and freight market traveling on nearby Lake Michigan.

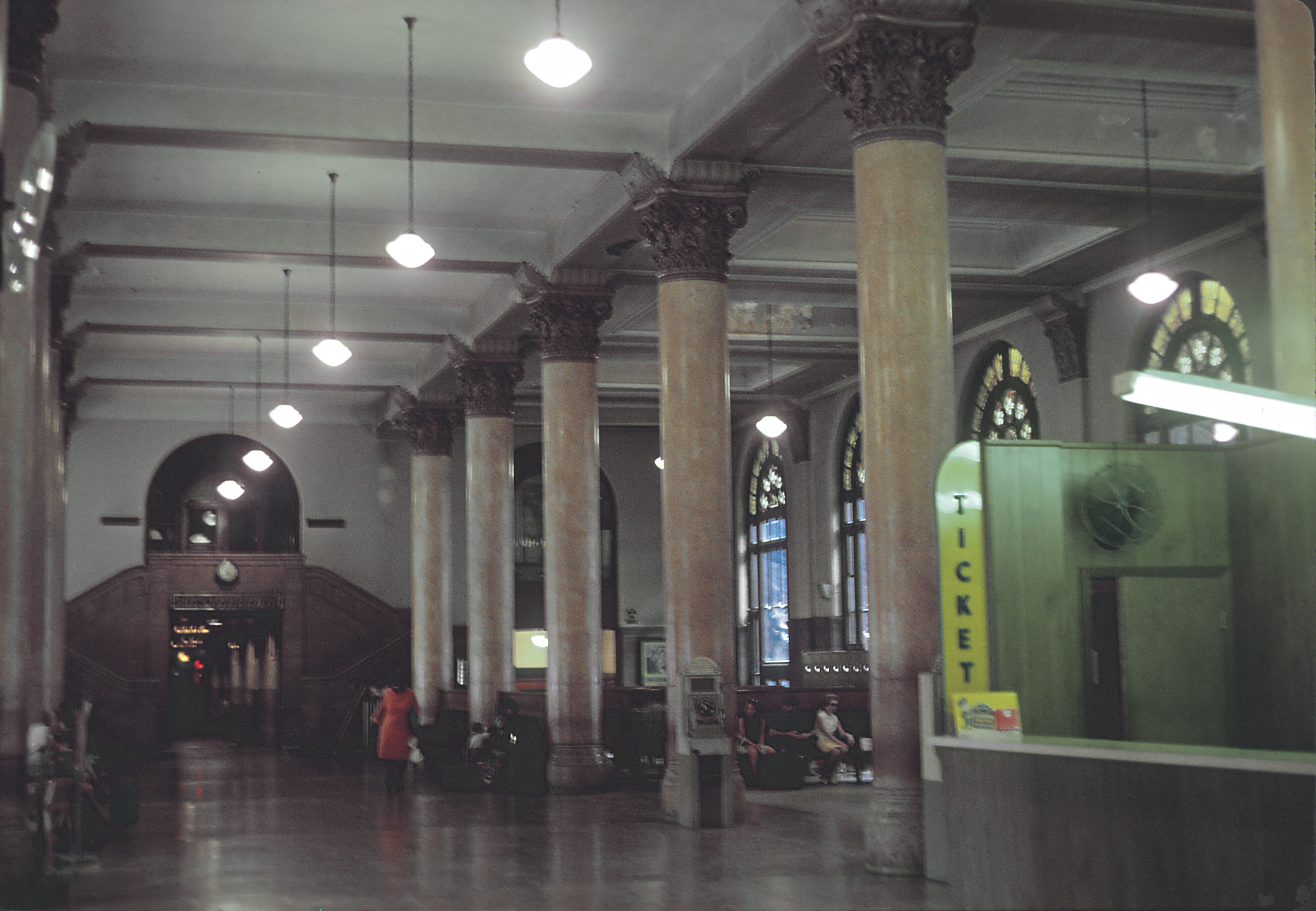
The waiting room of Grand Central Station had 26 ft (7.9 m) ceilings; the floor was made of marble.

Architect Solon S. Beman, who had gained notoriety as the designer of the Pullman company neighborhood, designed the station in the Norman Castellated and chose brick, brownstone and granite for construction. The structure measured 228 ft (69 m) along Harrison Street and 482 ft (147 m) along Wells. Imposing arches, crenellations, a spacious arched carriage-court facing Harrison Street, and a multitude of towers dominated the walls. Its most famous feature, however, was an impressive 247 ft (75 m) tower at the northeast corner of the structure. Beman, an early advocate of the Floating raft system to solve Chicago's unique swampy soil problems, designed the tower to sit within a floating foundation supported by 55 ft (17 m) deep piles. Early on, an 11,000 lb (5,000 kg) bell in the tower rang on the hour. At some point, however, the bell was removed, but the tower (and its huge clock, 13 ft (4.0 m) in diameter—at one time among the largest in the United States, remained.

The interior of Grand Central Station was decorated as extravagantly as the exterior. The waiting room, for example, had marble floors, Corinthian-style columns, stained-glass windows and a marble fireplace, and a restaurant. The station also had a 100-room hotel, but accommodations ended late in 1901.

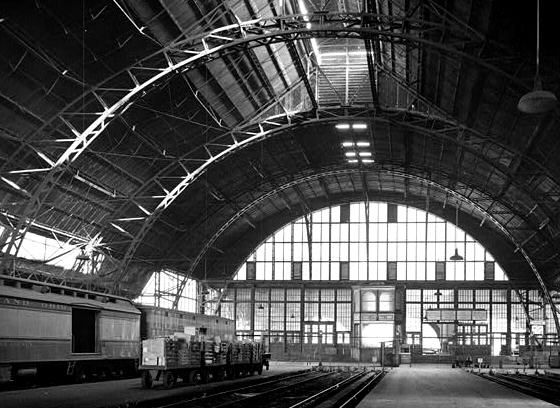
The train shed of Grand Central Station

Not as famous as the clocktower but equally architecturally unique was Grand Central Station's self-supporting glass and steel train shed, 555 ft × 156 ft × 79 ft (169 m × 48 m × 24 m), among the largest in the world at the time it was constructed. The trainshed, considered an architectural gem and a marvel of engineering long after it was built, housed six tracks and had platforms long enough to accommodate fifteen-car passenger trains. The final construction cost totaled over one million dollars.

The Chicago and Northern Pacific Railroad, a subsidiary of the Northern Pacific Railway, formally opened Grand Central Station December 8, 1890. Seeking access to the Chicago railway market, the Northern Pacific had purchased Grand Central and the trackage leading to it from the Wisconsin Central with the intention of making the station its eastern terminus. When it opened, Grand Central hosted trains from the WC (which connected with its former trackage in Forest Park, Illinois), and the Minnesota and Northwestern Railroad (M&NW), which made also a connection at Forest Park. By December 1891, the tenants also included the Baltimore and Ohio Railroad, and in 1903, the Pere Marquette Railway also started using the station.

Weakened by the prolonged economic downturn of the Panic of 1893, the Northern Pacific went bankrupt in October 1893, and was forced to end its ownership of the Chicago and Northern Pacific, including Grand Central Station. Ultimately, tenant railroad Baltimore and Ohio purchased the station at foreclosure in 1910 along with all the terminal trackage to form the Baltimore and Ohio Chicago Terminal Railroad (B&OCT).

== Services ==
Trains to Grand Central Station ran over the Baltimore and Ohio Chicago Terminal Railroad. Notice the circuitous route taken by trains from the east to the station, including a nearly seven mile (eleven kilometer) detour along Rock Island Line trackage.

The smallest of Chicago's passenger rail terminals, Grand Central Station was a relatively quiet place, even during its heyday. Grand Central never became a prominent destination for large numbers of cross-country travelers, nor for the daily waves of commuters from the suburbs, that other Chicago terminals were. In 1912, for example, Grand Central served 3,175 passengers per day—representing only 4.5 percent of the total number for the city of Chicago—and serviced an average of 38 trains per day (including 4 B&O suburban trains). This number paled in comparison to the 146 trains served by Dearborn Station, the 191 by LaSalle Street Station, the 281 at Union Station, the 310 by the Chicago and North Western Terminal and the 373 trains per day at Central Station.

The station did host some of Baltimore and Ohio's most famous passenger trains, including the Capitol Limited to Washington, D.C. Unfortunately, however, the circuitous trackage leading to the station from the east forced these trains miles out of their way through the industrial southwest and west side of the city (See map to the left). Other tenants such as the Soo Line Railroad (which purchased the WC in 1909), the M&NW (which became known as the Chicago Great Western Railway in 1893), and the Pere Marquette Railway (which merged into the Chesapeake and Ohio Railway in 1947), were nowhere near the scale of B&O's operations in the intercity passenger rail market.

=== Intercity passenger trains ===
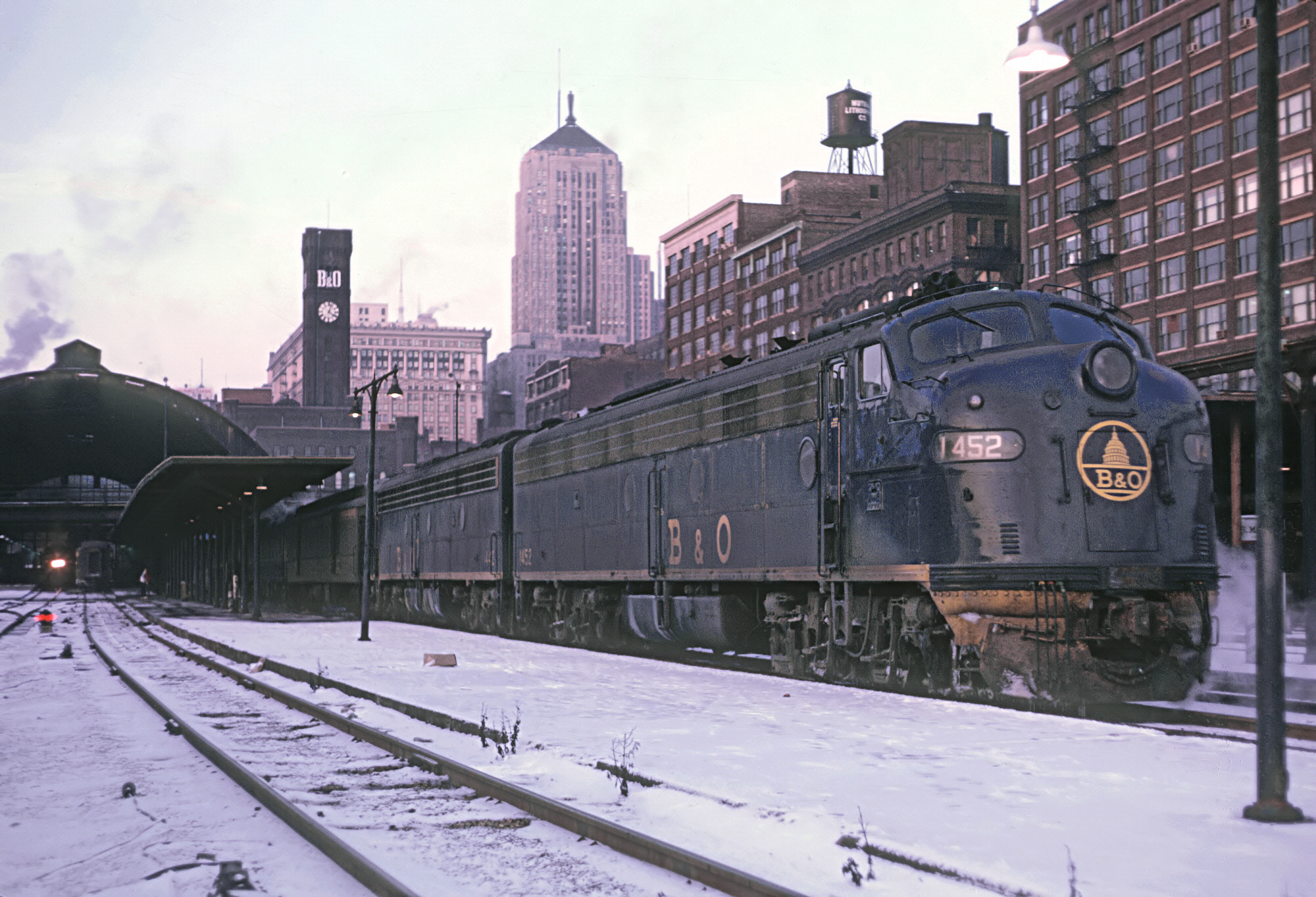
The Baltimore and Ohio Railroad's Capitol Limited at Grand Central Station in 1967.

Grand Central Station served as a terminal for the following lines and intercity trains:

- Baltimore and Ohio Railroad: Capitol Limited, Columbian, and Shenandoah to New York City and the Chicago - Washington Express to Washington, D.C., along with other trains to Cumberland, Maryland and Wheeling, West Virginia.
- Chicago Great Western Railway (until 1956): Legionnaire, later Minnesotan, both to Minneapolis, Minnesota. Other trains to Kansas City, Missouri and Omaha, Nebraska. All passenger services ceased in 1956.
- Minneapolis, St. Paul and Sault Ste. Marie Railway (Soo Line) (until 1899, and from 1912 to 1965; used Central Station in between and after): Laker to Duluth, Minnesota.
- Pere Marquette Railway: Grand Rapids Flyer and Grand Rapids Express to Grand Rapids and Muskegon, Michigan and, ultimately to Buffalo, New York. The above Grand Rapids trains were succeeded by the Night Express with sections to Grand Rapids and to Muskegon. The Resort Special went to Bay View via Traverse City and Petoskey. Upon the 1947 merger with the Chesapeake and Ohio Railway, PM trains were renamed Pere Marquette, except the Resort Special kept its name.
- From December 1900 to July 1903, the New York Central Railroad and Chicago, Rock Island and Pacific Railroad used Grand Central, as their LaSalle Street Station was being rebuilt.

=== Suburban commuter trains ===
In addition to intercity passenger rail service, Grand Central Station hosted several short-lived interurban passenger rail operations. To coincide with the World's Columbian Exposition in 1893, the Baltimore and Ohio operated a special passenger train between Grand Central Station and Jackson Park, with intermediate stops at Halsted Street, Blue Island Avenue, Ashland Avenue and Ogden Avenue. Grand Central Station also served as a terminal for at least three suburban commuter lines. One, operated by the Wisconsin Central, operated trains west of Grand Central Station to Altenheim. The second began service in 1900 by the Chicago Terminal Transfer Railroad, and continued when B&O purchased the line in 1910. It operated six trains a day between Grand Central and Chicago Heights, stopping in Blue Island, Harvey, Thornton and Glenwood. The line was unsuccessful and ended as early as 1915. The third was run by the Chicago Great Western. It ran through Forest Park to Elmhurst, Lombard, Glen Ellyn, Gretna (Carol Stream), Ingalton (West Chicago), St. Charles, Wasco, Lily Lake, Virgil, Sycamore, and DeKalb. It was also short lived. Service was discontinued in 1906. None of the other tenant railroads operated commuter trains from Grand Central Station.

== Closure and demolition ==
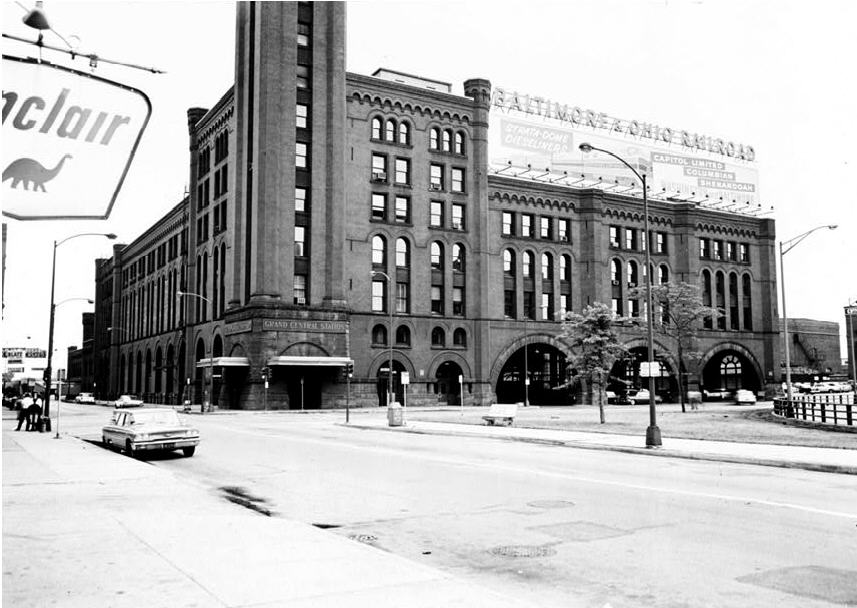
Grand Central Station, looking south down Wells Street, 1963.

The lightly used terminal became even quieter in the years following World War II, with Grand Central serving 26 intercity passenger trains, down from nearly 40 at its busiest. Passenger trains were dropped and service was curtailed. By 1956, the Chicago Great Western which, as late as 1940, had run six trains per day in and out of Grand Central, ceased operating passenger service into Chicago. As a result, by 1963 only ten intercity trains remained, of which six were operated by the Baltimore and Ohio. The number of passengers using the remaining service shrank proportionately. By 1969, the year the station closed, it served an average of only 210 passengers per day.

Due to its small size, its age and perceived obsolescence, Grand Central was the target of a long-term political effort by the city government to encourage consolidation of passenger terminals in the south Loop. It was ultimately that political effort that sealed the fate of Grand Central, described in 1969 as "decaying, dreary, and sadly out of date".

Faced with decreasing passenger numbers and intense political pressure to consolidate, the railroads operating into Grand Central Station re-routed their trains into other Chicago terminals, beginning with the Soo Line into Central Station in 1963. The remaining six Baltimore and Ohio and ex-Pere Marquette trains last used Grand Central Station on November 8, 1969, and were routed into their new terminus at the Chicago and North Western Terminal the following day.

Sitting unused, Grand Central Station's value as an architectural and engineering masterpiece was discounted by its railroad owner, who believed the value of the land for urban redevelopment to be quite substantial. As a result, the trackage was scrapped and the entire terminal was razed by the railroad in 1971.

== Present day ==
Approximately 6.5 acres remain vacant between Harrison and Polk. In 1984, developers began construction of River City, just south of the site. River City was intended to be a complex of four 85-story office and residential towers stretching along the Chicago River from Harrison to Roosevelt Road designed by Bertrand Goldberg, designer of the landmark Marina City along the main branch of the Chicago River. Only a 17-story apartment building was completed in 1986, however it can accommodate additional floors as part of an expansion. Several other plans for office towers, condominiums, or retail development on the site have all been proposed over the past several years. In March 2008, CSX – the successor company to the B&O – sold the property to a Skokie, Illinois-based capital group with the intent of redeveloping the site with mixed-use high-rise buildings.

The land at the corner of Harrison and Wells, the lot on which the station itself stood, remained vacant until early 2020 when the luxury apartments "Alta Grand Central" were erected.

MGLM Architects proposed constructing a new rail station on the site in February 2012 to accommodate high-speed trains between the city core and O'Hare International Airport. The firm claimed that this location would be preferable to adding additional capacity at the already crowded Union Station.

As of October 2013, a proposal to build two towers containing 700 units (rental and possibly condo apartments) has resurfaced for 1.5 acres of the 6.5-acre site. The development known as Franklin Point was backed by rapper Jay-Z's business partners Arnold Bize and Naum Chernyavsky.

In September 2016, construction began on a new development named Project Riverline; a joint venture between CMK Companies and Lendlease. The redevelopment will consist of over 3,600 residences spread across eight waterfront buildings, and is estimated to be completed in 2024.

=== Legacy ===
Twenty years after its demolition, Grand Central Station was identified by local historians, railroad enthusiasts and architecture critics as "the queen of the city's old train stations". Author Carl W. Condit remarked that the station was "an important Chicago building even if it never received much recognition". Architect Harry Weese bemoaned its "wanton destruction". Ira J. Bach noted that when the terminal was demolished: "Chicago lost its greatest monument to the institution which had created it: the railroad."

=== The B&OCT Bascule Bridge ===
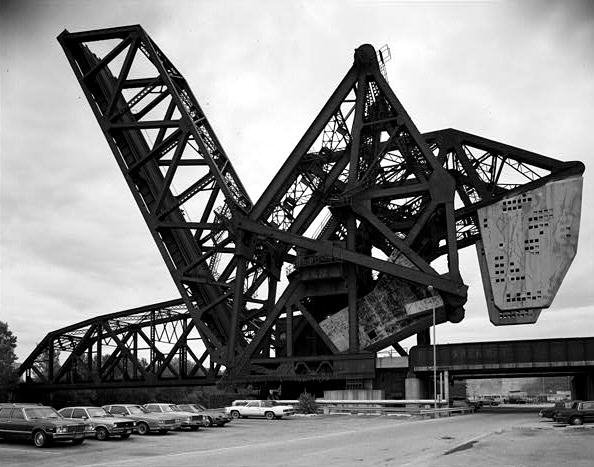
Looking southwest, the B&OCT bascule bridge over the Chicago River is in the foreground, locked in an upright position. The St. Charles Air Line Railroad bridge is behind. (c. 1988)

At the time Grand Central was completed, passenger trains approached the terminal by crossing the Chicago River to the southwest over a bridge between Taylor Street and Roosevelt Road, constructed in 1885. This first bridge was replaced by a taller structure in 1901 to accommodate larger boats and ships on the south branch of the river.

When the Chicago River was straightened and widened in the 1930s, the United States Department of War insisted the Baltimore and Ohio build a new bridge adjacent to that of the St Charles Air Line which crossed the river between 15th and 16th Streets. The new bridge's location (41°51′40″N 87°38′06″W), about seven blocks south of its previous crossing, exacerbated the circuitous route of the Baltimore & Ohio Chicago Terminal Railroad (B&OCT) trackage leading to Grand Central Station. Both the B&OCT bascule bridge, and that of the St. Charles Air Line Bridge, also a bascule bridge immediately adjacent to it, were built in 1930.

As of 2020 the B&OCT bridge sits unused.
