= Diplomat (train) =

1930–1961 B&O American passenger train

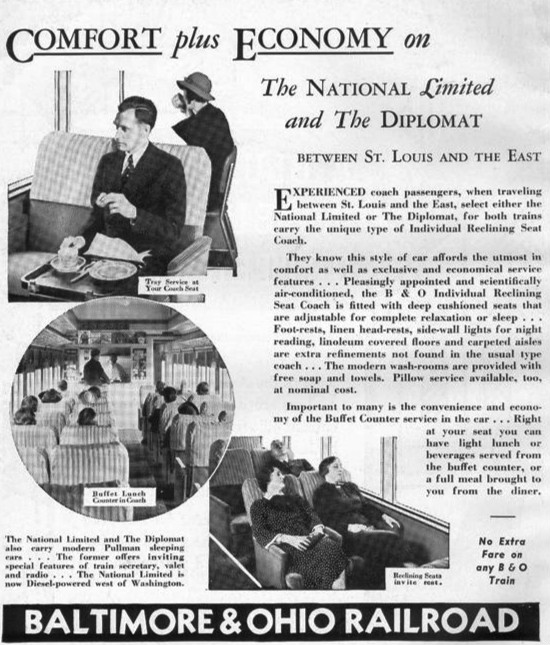
- 1938 ad for the Diplomat in B&O's employee magazine.

Overview
- Service type: Inter-city rail
- Status: Discontinued
- Locale: Mid-Atlantic United States; Midwestern United States
- First service: 1930; 1964 (2nd incarnation, new route)
- Last service: 1961; 1968 (2nd incarnation)
- Former operator: Baltimore & Ohio Railroad

Route
- Termini: Jersey City, New Jersey; 2nd incarnation: Washington, D.C. St. Louis, Missouri; 2nd incarnation: Chicago, Illinois
- Service frequency: Daily
- Train numbers: 3 (westbound); 4 (eastbound)

On-board services
- Seating arrangements: Coaches
- Sleeping arrangements: Sleeping cars
- Catering facilities: Dining car
- Observation facilities: Lounge car

Technical
- Track gauge: 4 ft 8 1/2 in (1,435 mm)

The Diplomat was a named passenger train of the Baltimore and Ohio Railroad (B&O) during the 1930s–1950s connecting New York City and St. Louis, Missouri, via Washington, D.C. Other B&O trains on the route during that period were the premier National Limited and the workhorse Metropolitan Special. The train was inaugurated in August 1930 after several changes to trains along the St. Louis Route. After World War II, the Diplomat operated as Train No. 3 westbound, and No. 4 eastbound. It was timed to provide connections to several western railroads that terminated in St. Louis, including the Frisco, the Santa Fe, Cotton Belt and Missouri Pacific, among others.

B&O's New York terminal was actually in Jersey City, New Jersey, using the New Jersey Central's Jersey City terminal. Passengers were then transferred to buses that met the train right on the platform. These buses were then ferried across the Hudson River to Manhattan, where they proceeded to various "stations" including the Vanderbilt Hotel, Wanamaker's, Columbus Circle, and Rockefeller Center, as well as Brooklyn.

== Stations ==
| Station | State |
|---|---|
| New York (Rockefeller Center) (bus) | New York |
| New York (42nd Street Station) (bus) | New York |
| Brooklyn (bus) | New York |
| New York (Columbus Circle Station) (bus) | New York |
| Jersey City (Communipaw Terminal) (train) | New Jersey |
| Elizabeth (CNJ's Elizabeth Station) | New Jersey |
| Wayne Junction station | Pennsylvania |
| Philadelphia (Chestnut Street Station) | Pennsylvania |
| Wilmington | Delaware |
| Baltimore (Mt. Royal Station) | Maryland |
| Baltimore (Camden Station) | Maryland |
| Washington (Union Station) | District of Columbia |
| Cumberland (Queen City Station) | Maryland |
| Parkersburg | West Virginia |
| Athens station (Ohio) | Ohio |
| Chillicothe | Ohio |
| Cincinnati (Union Terminal) | Ohio |
| Louisville (Central Station) (secondary branch of the train) | Kentucky |
| St. Louis (Union Station) | Missouri |

== Route and schedule ==
Route of the Diplomat (in orange)

In 1947, westbound Diplomat Train # 3 operated on the following schedule (departure times at principal stops shown):

| City | Departure time |
|---|---|
| New York (Rockefeller Center) | 1:15 p.m. |
| New York (42nd Street Station) | 1:25 p.m. |
| Brooklyn, NY | 1:20 p.m. |
| New York (Columbus Circle Station) | 1:20 p.m. |
| Jersey City, NJ (Communipaw Terminal) | 2:15 p.m. |
| Elizabeth, NJ (CNJ's Elizabeth Station) | 2:32 p.m. |
| Wayne Junction station (transfer station for Reading Railway trains) | 3:43 p.m. |
| Philadelphia, Pa. (Chestnut Street Station) | 3:58 p.m. |
| Wilmington, Del. | 4:27 p.m. |
| Baltimore, Md. (Mt. Royal Station) | 5:46 p.m. |
| Baltimore, Md. (Camden Station) | 5:54 p.m. |
| Washington, D.C. (Union Station) | 7:00 p.m. |
| Cincinnati (Union Terminal) | 8:05 a.m. |
| Louisville, Ky. (Central Station) (via connection at Cincinnati) | 10:35 a.m. |
| St. Louis (Union Station) | 2:55 p.m. |
source: Baltimore and Ohio System Timetable, July 6, 1947

After the B&O's discontinuation of passenger service to New York on April 26, 1958, the eastern terminus of the Diplomat was Washington, D.C. Unfortunately, the B&O was never in a position to directly compete against the much faster and more populous routes the New York Central and Pennsylvania Railroad trains used between New York and St. Louis. Instead, the B&O concentrated on service, and won consistent loyalty from business travelers and the general public alike. However, the B&O suffered from a lack of large population centers along the route. Only Cincinnati, Ohio, represented a truly large city big enough between Washington and St. Louis that could add a significant amount of passenger traffic.

The B&O discontinued service between Cincinnati and Baltimore on September 17, 1960, leaving a rump train between St. Louis and Cincinnati. The B&O discontinued the train altogether on April 30, 1961, leaving the National Limited to handle passengers on the route.

The Diplomat was equipped with a dining car, lounge car, and Pullman sleeping cars, in addition to coaches.

== Altered revival of the Diplomat ==
By the end of 1964, the B&O revived the train, but with a new itinerary. It would now travel as #7 from Washington, D.C.'s Union Station to Chicago, Illinois' Grand Central Station, and as #8 in the east-bound direction. Major intermediate stops for this route's itinerary northwest of Maryland included Pittsburgh, Youngstown, Akron and Gary.

Amenities in equipment consisted of, in addition to coaches: roomette / double bedroom sleeping cars, dining-lounge car and a dining car. Schedules advertised a connection in Deshler, Ohio to the B&O's Cincinnatian bound for Toledo and Detroit. Passengers making the Washington-bound trip would take the Night Express from Detroit. However, in 1966, catering was simplified to a food bar coach. 1968 was the final year that the Diplomat appeared. In the final years approaching the termination of B&O passenger service, the Capitol Limited was the only remaining Washington-Chicago B&O train.
