= Athens station (Ohio) =

Former rail station in Athens, Ohio, US

Athens, OH
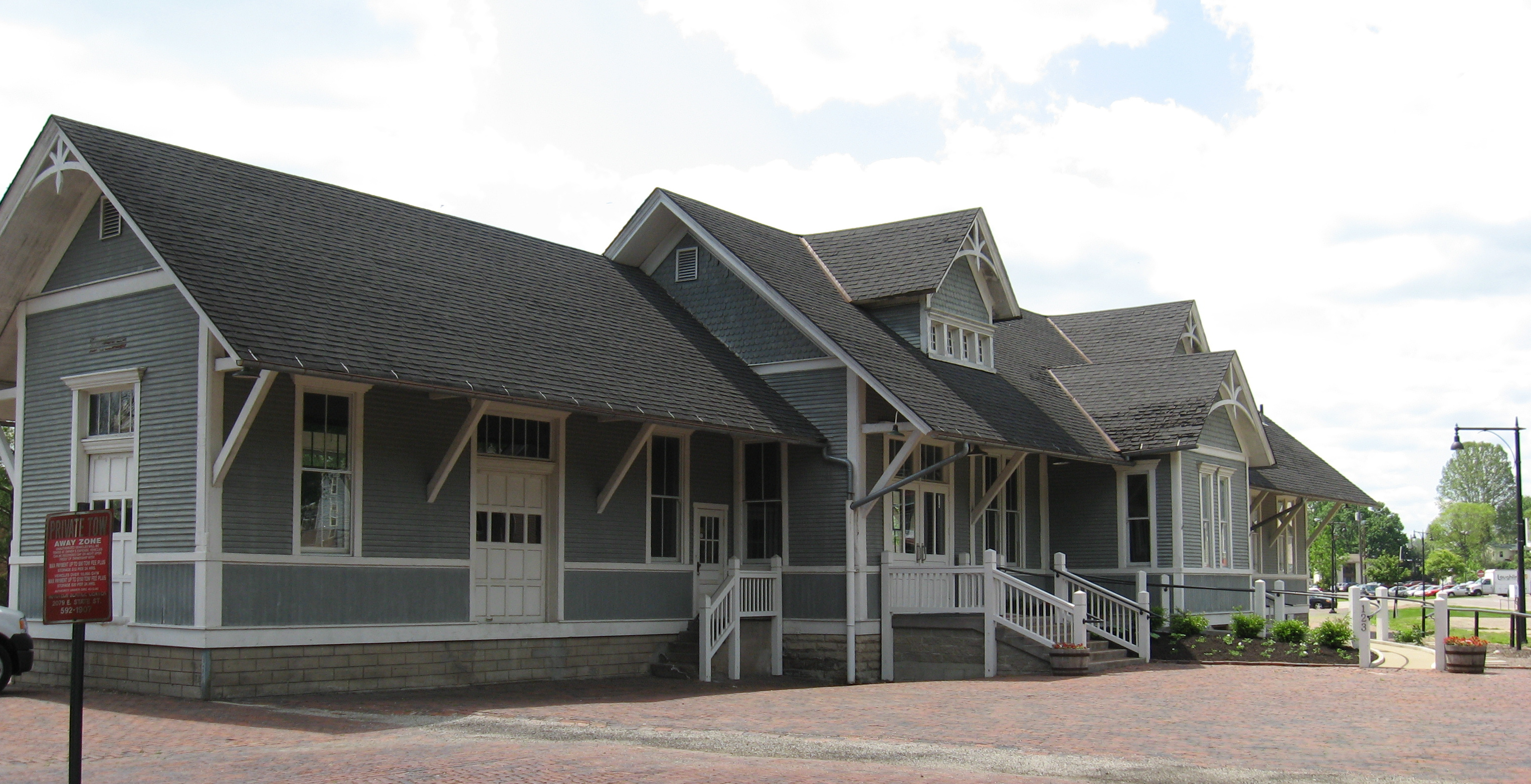
- Former Athens station building in 2009

General information
- Location: 123 West Union Street; Athens, Ohio; United States
- Coordinates: 39°19′44″N 82°6′21″W

History
- Opened: October 30, 1976
- Closed: October 1, 1981

Former services
Preceding station	Amtrak	Following station
Chillicothe toward Cincinnati (River Road)	Shenandoah 1976–1981	Parkersburg toward Washington, D.C.
Preceding station	Baltimore and Ohio Railroad	Following station
Grosvenor toward St. Louis	St. Louis Line Until 1971	Canaanville toward Cumberland
- Athens B & O Train Depot
- U.S. National Register of Historic Places
- Architectural style: Stick-Eastlake
- NRHP reference No.: 83001944
- Added to NRHP: January 11, 1983
Location

Athens station is a former train station in Athens, Ohio, adjacent to the campus of Ohio University. It served the Baltimore and Ohio Railroad from around 1890 until 1971, then Amtrak from 1976 to 1981. It is listed on the National Register of Historic Places as the Athens B & O Train Depot.

== History ==
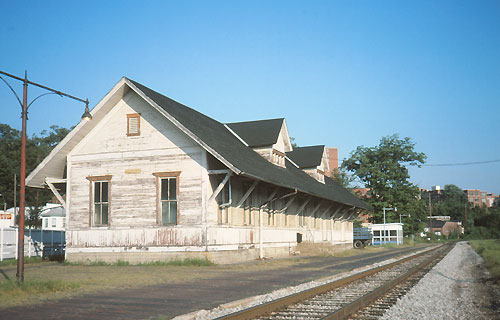
Athens station in 1984

The Baltimore and Ohio Railroad (B&O) constructed the station building around 1890, replacing an older structure. It is a one-story building in the Stick-Eastlake style, measuring 128.5 by 25.5 feet (39.2 m × 7.8 m). It was modified around 1915: a circular tower was removed, and the ends of the structure were enclosed.

Athens was on the B&O mainline between Washington, D.C., and Cincinnati. It was served by trains including the St. Louis–Jersey City Diplomat and National Limited, and later the Metropolitan. B&O service on May 1, 1971, when Amtrak took over most remaining intercity passenger train service in the United States.

Amtrak began operating the Cincinnati–Washington, D.C. Shenandoah on October 30, 1976, with a stop at Athens. Amtrak added a small "Amshack" east of the station building. The Shenandoah was discontinued on October 1, 1981; it was replaced by the Capitol Limited, which followed a different route west of Cumberland and did not serve Athens. The station was added to the National Register of Historic Places on January 11, 1983. The tracks through Athens were later removed, but some parts were still present well into the 2010s, such as just behind the Athens Public Library.
