= Metropolitan Special =

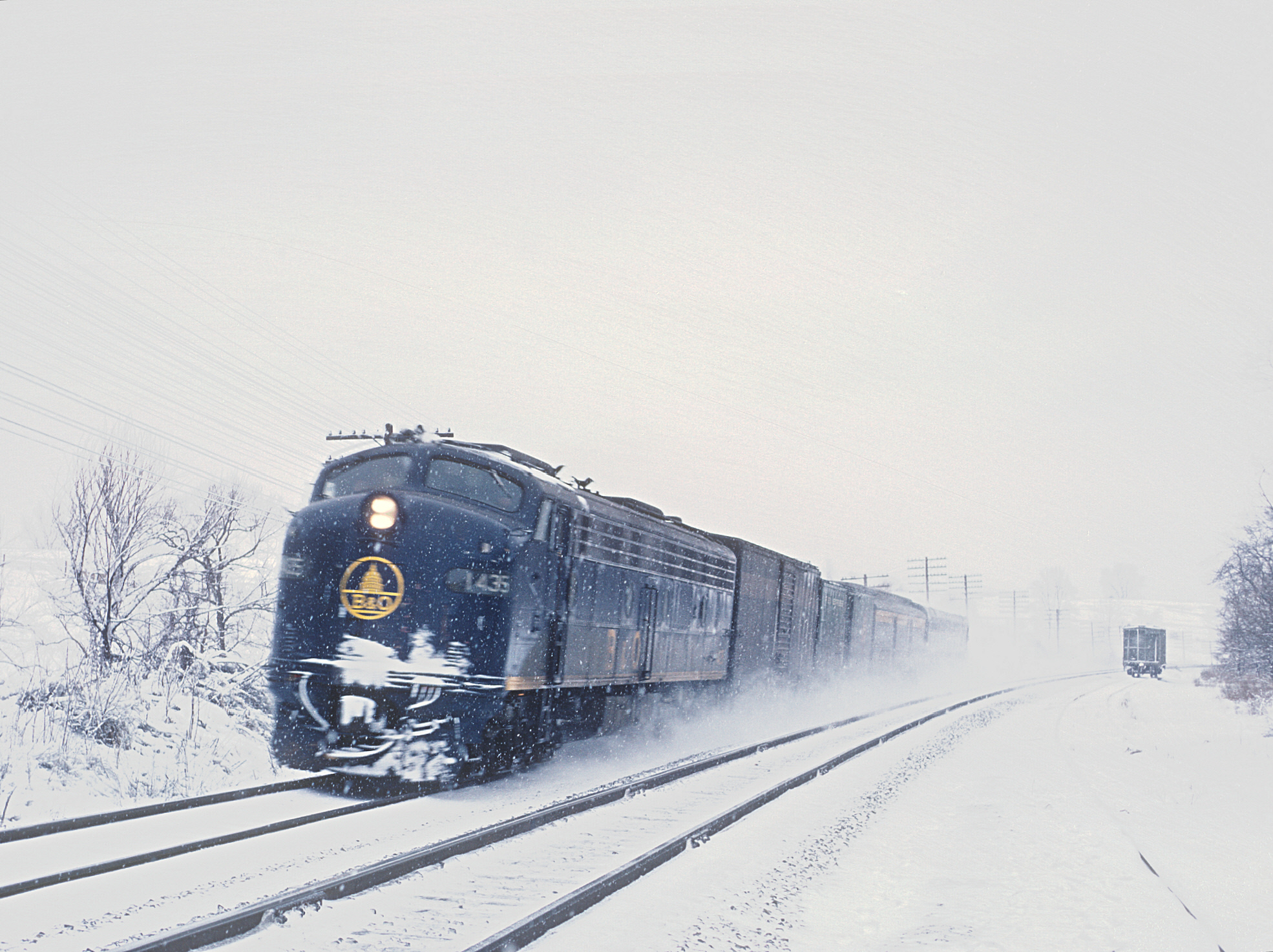
- The Metropolitan in Gaithersburg, Maryland, in 1969

Overview
- Service type: Inter-city rail
- Status: Discontinued
- Locale: Mid-Atlantic United States; Midwestern United States
- First service: 1919
- Last service: April 30, 1971
- Former operator: Baltimore and Ohio Railroad

Route
- Termini: Jersey City, New Jersey; St. Louis, Missouri
- Service frequency: Daily
- Train numbers: 11 (westbound); 12 (eastbound)

On-board services
- Seating arrangements: Reclining seat coaches [1958]
- Sleeping arrangements: Roomettes and double bedrooms
- Catering facilities: Parlor-Dining car (Washington - Cincinnati), lunch counter and lounge rooms (Cincinnati - St. Louis)

Technical
- Track gauge: 4 ft 8 1/2 in (1,435 mm)

The Metropolitan Special was a passenger train of the Baltimore and Ohio Railroad (B&O) that operated until 1971. For most of its career, it ran between St. Louis, Missouri, and Jersey City, New Jersey.

== History ==
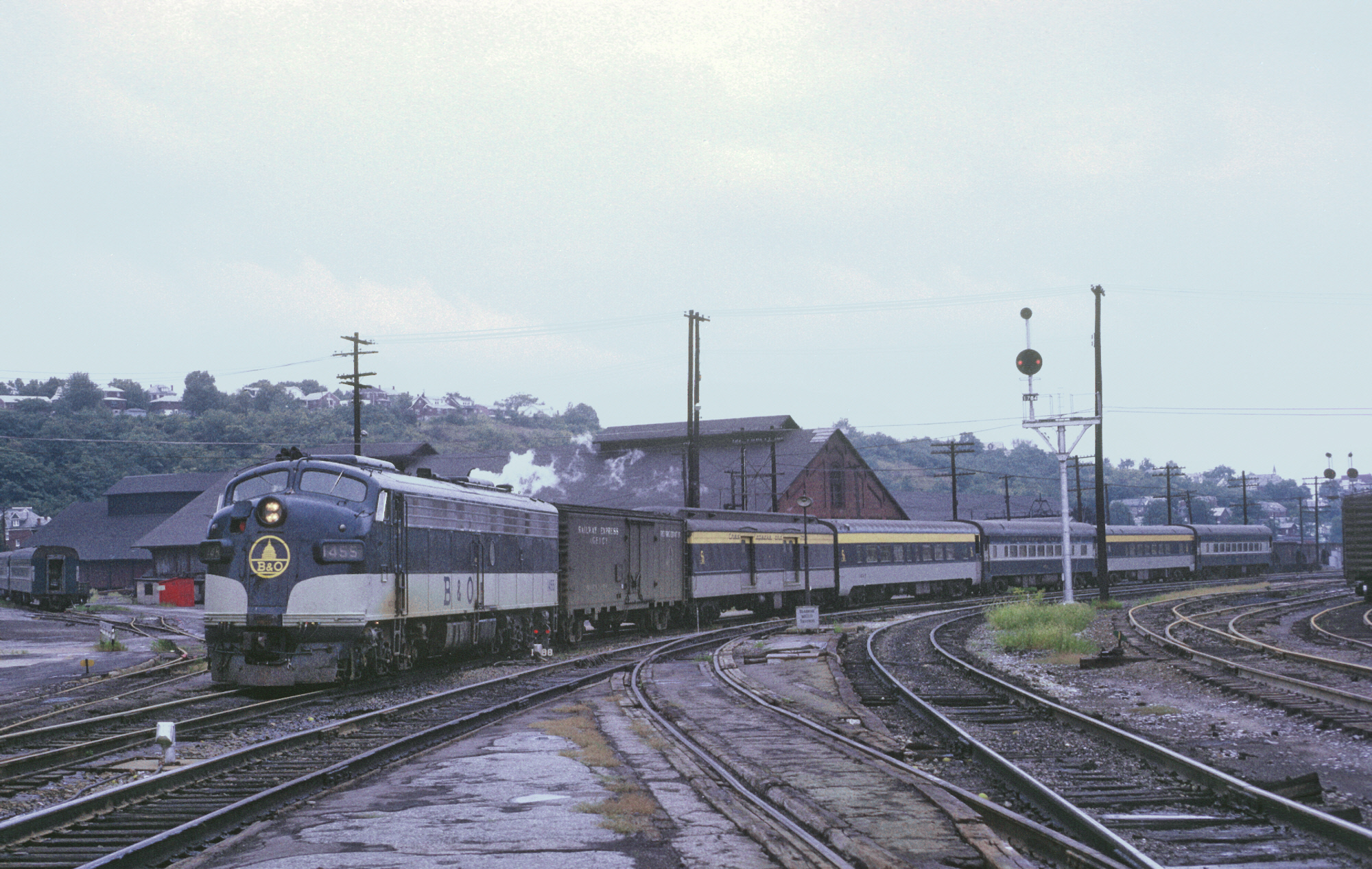
The combined Metropolitan/Shenandoah at Cumberland, Maryland, in 1970

In earlier years only the east-bound #12 carried the name, while the Diplomat (as #11) carried the west-bound direction of the route. The train's eastern terminus was Washington, D.C. Sleeping car passengers were able to ride trains continuously from St. Louis to Jersey City, New Jersey, where at Communipaw Terminal passengers transferred to buses and ferries to Manhattan in New York City. By 1940, the eastern terminus became Baltimore, and the west-bound trip joined in carrying the Metropolitan Special name.

Major intermediate station stops included Washington, D.C., and Cincinnati, Ohio. The Metropolitan Special carried vast amounts of mail and express packages in many (often 10+) baggage cars and express cars Added revenue for the train came from Railway Post Office cars, which sorted and canceled mail en route, between terminals. Even with declining passenger revenue through the 1950s and 1960s, the B&O passenger department relied heavily on trains such as the Metropolitan Special because of the revenue generated by moving mail and express packages.

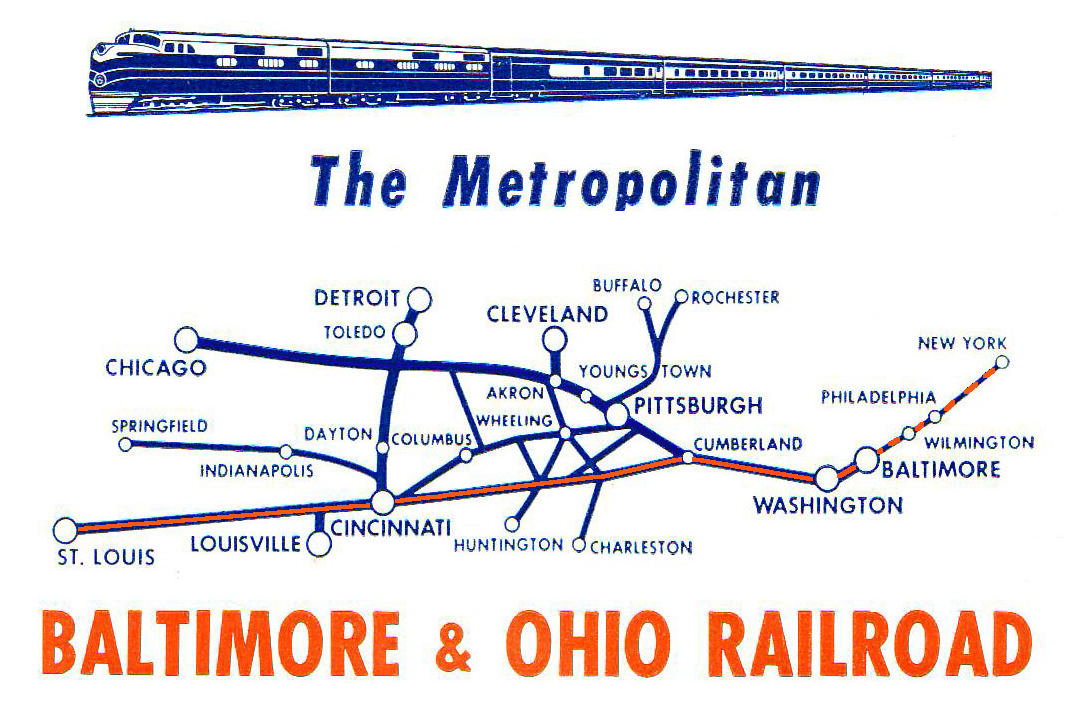

In 1964 it was listed as primarily a mail train, and the train served various smaller towns and villages that were bypassed by the more prestigious trains along the route, the National Limited and the Diplomat. Special was dropped from its name. The next year the B&O dropped the sleeping car from the train. However, by the end of 1967, the United States Postal Service dealt a heavy blow to the B&O, canceling most of its lucrative post office contracts. With such a drop in revenue, the fate of the Metropolitan Special was sealed. By 1969, its route was shortened to Washington to Cincinnati. The train was discontinued on the first day of Amtrak service, May 1, 1971.

== Stations ==
Station	State
New York (Rockefeller Center) (bus)	New York
New York (42nd Street Station) (bus)	New York
Brooklyn (bus)	New York
New York (Columbus Circle Station) (bus)	New York
Jersey City (Communipaw Terminal) (train)	New Jersey
Elizabeth (CNJ's Elizabeth Station)	New Jersey
Wayne Junction station	Pennsylvania
Baltimore and Ohio Railroad station (Philadelphia)	Pennsylvania
Wilmington	Delaware
Baltimore (Mt. Royal Station)	Maryland
Baltimore (Camden Station)	Maryland
Washington (Union Station)	District of Columbia
Cincinnati (Union Terminal)	Ohio
Louisville (Central Station)	Kentucky
St. Louis (Union Station)	Missouri
