= Central Railroad of New Jersey Terminal =

Former intermodal terminal in Jersey City, New Jersey

Communipaw Terminal
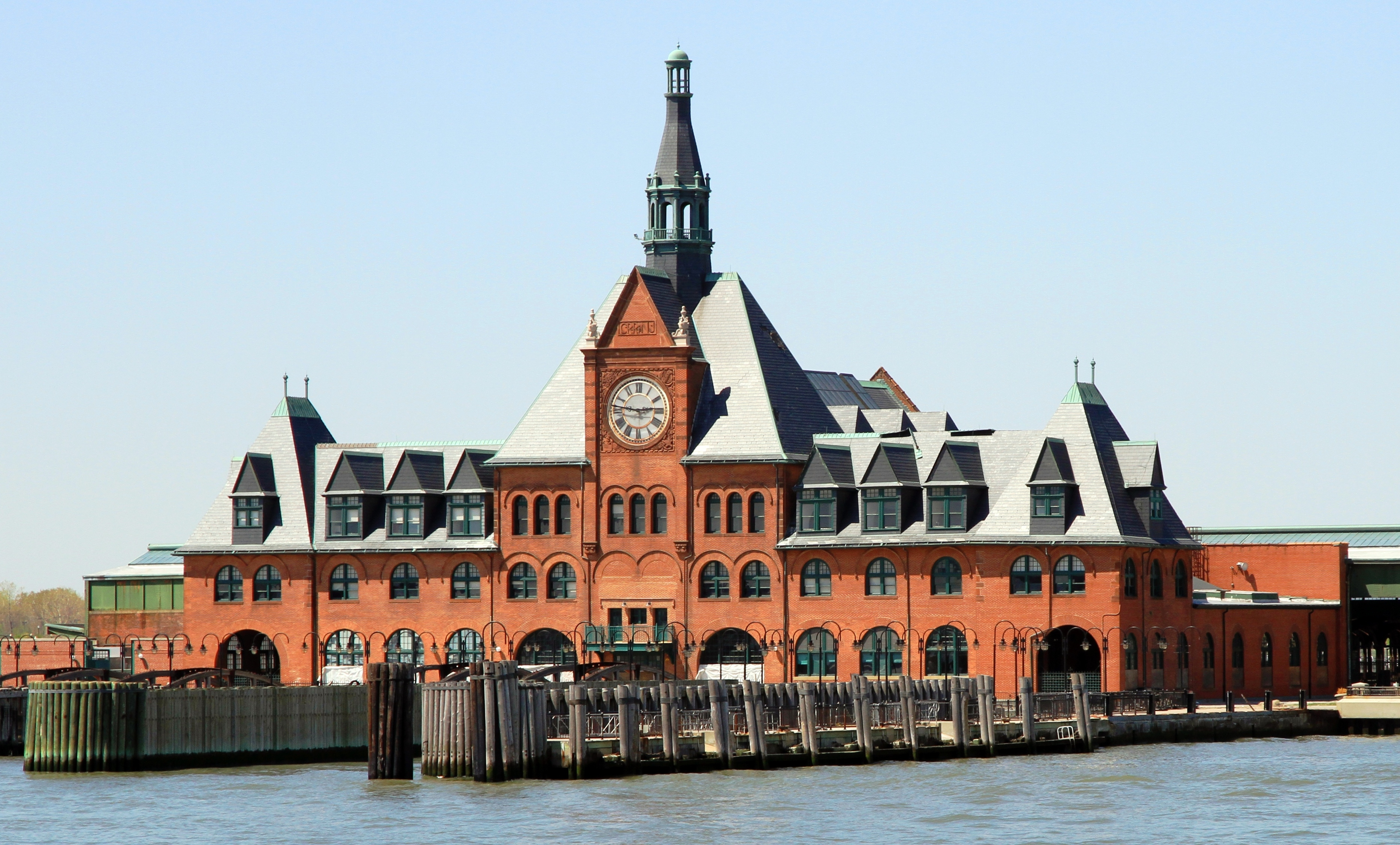
- The Central Railroad of New Jersey Terminal at Liberty State Park in 2013

General information
- Location: Liberty State Park; Jersey City, New Jersey, U.S.

Construction
- Accessible: No

History
- Closed: April 30, 1967

Former services
Preceding station	Central Railroad of New Jersey	Following station
Terminus	Communipaw Ferry	Liberty Street Terminus
Elizabeth toward Scranton	Main Line	Terminus
Elizabethport toward Scranton	Main Line	Terminus
Greenville toward Somerville	Somerville – Jersey City Local	Terminus
Claremont toward Somerville	Somerville – Jersey City Local	Terminus
Communipaw Avenue toward Elizabethport	Suburban service to Elizabethport	Terminus
Arlington Avenue toward Newark Broad Street	Newark and New York Branch	Terminus
Claremont toward Newark Broad Street	Newark and New York Branch	Terminus
Preceding station	Baltimore and Ohio Railroad	Following station
Elizabeth toward Chicago	Main Line	Terminus
Elizabeth toward Philadelphia: Chestnut St. or Reading Terminal	Philadelphia – Jersey City Local	Terminus
Preceding station	Lehigh Valley Railroad	Following station
Jackson Avenue toward Buffalo	Main Line 1913–1918	Terminus
- Central Railroad of New Jersey Terminal
- U.S. National Register of Historic Places
- New Jersey Register of Historic Places
- Location within Hudson County, New Jersey Location within New Jersey Location within the United States
- Location: Liberty State Park; Jersey City, New Jersey
- Coordinates: 40°42′26″N 74°2′7″W
- Area: 63 acres (25 ha)
- Built: 1889
- Architects: William H. Peddle, Peabody & Stearns
- Architectural style: Richardsonian Romanesque
- NRHP reference No.: 75001138
- NJRHP No.: 1513

Significant dates
- Added to NRHP: September 12, 1975
- Designated NJRHP: August 27, 1975
Location

The Central Railroad of New Jersey Terminal, also known as Communipaw Terminal and Jersey City Terminal, was the Central Railroad of New Jersey's waterfront passenger terminal in Jersey City, New Jersey. The terminal was built in 1889, replacing an earlier one that had been in use since 1864. It operated until April 30, 1967.

It also serviced the Central Railroad of New Jersey-operated Reading Railroad, the Baltimore and Ohio Railroad, and the Lehigh Valley Railroad during various periods in its 78 years of operation.

The terminal was one of five passenger railroad terminals that lined the Hudson Waterfront during the 19th and 20th centuries, the others being Weehawken, Hoboken, Pavonia and Exchange Place, with Hoboken being the only station that is still in use, as of 2024.

The headhouse was renovated and incorporated into Liberty State Park. The station has been listed on the New Jersey Register of Historic Places and National Register of Historic Places since September 12, 1975. It also has been named a New Jersey State Historic Site.

== Description ==
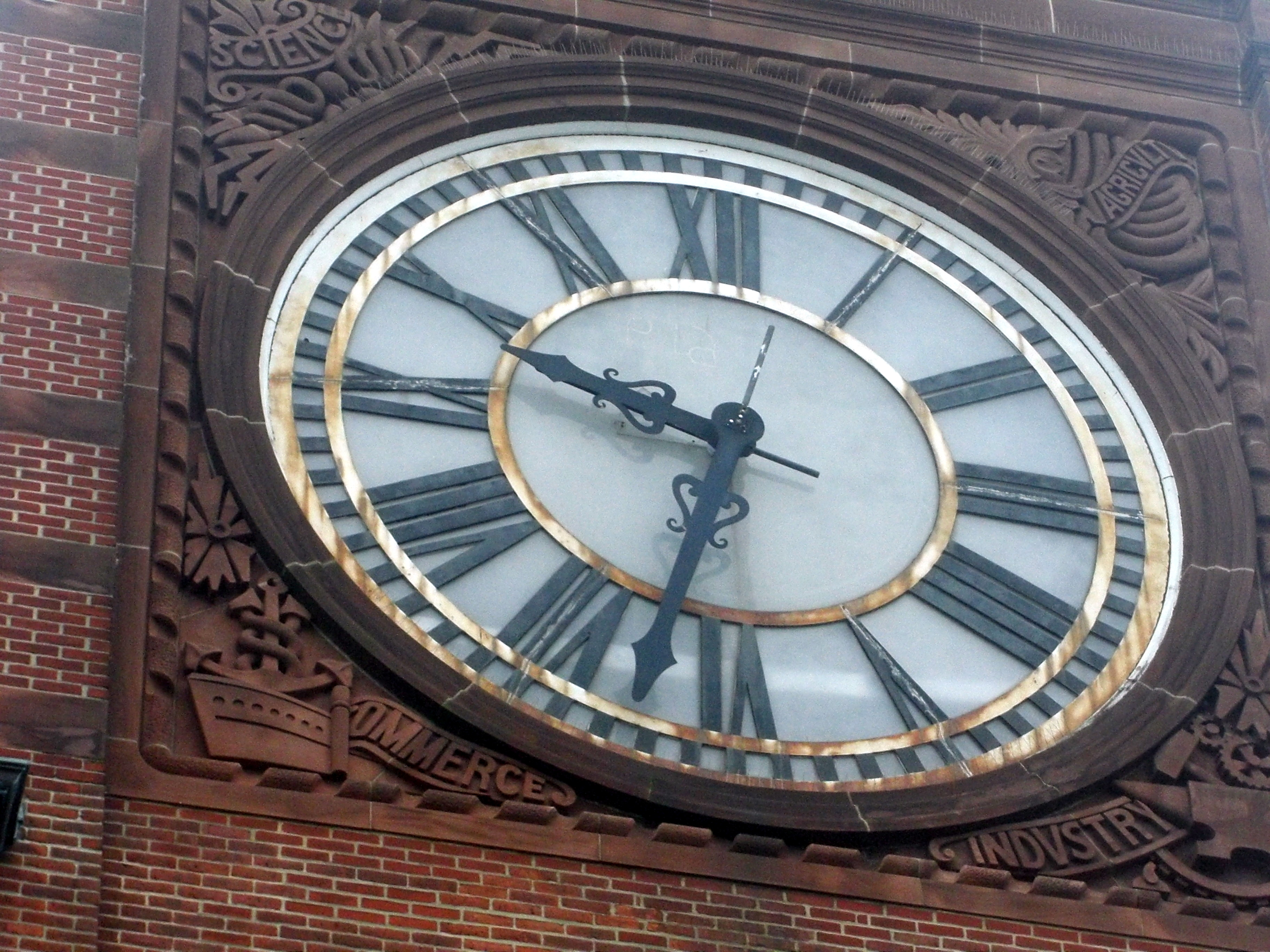
The outdoor clock at Central New Jersey Terminal

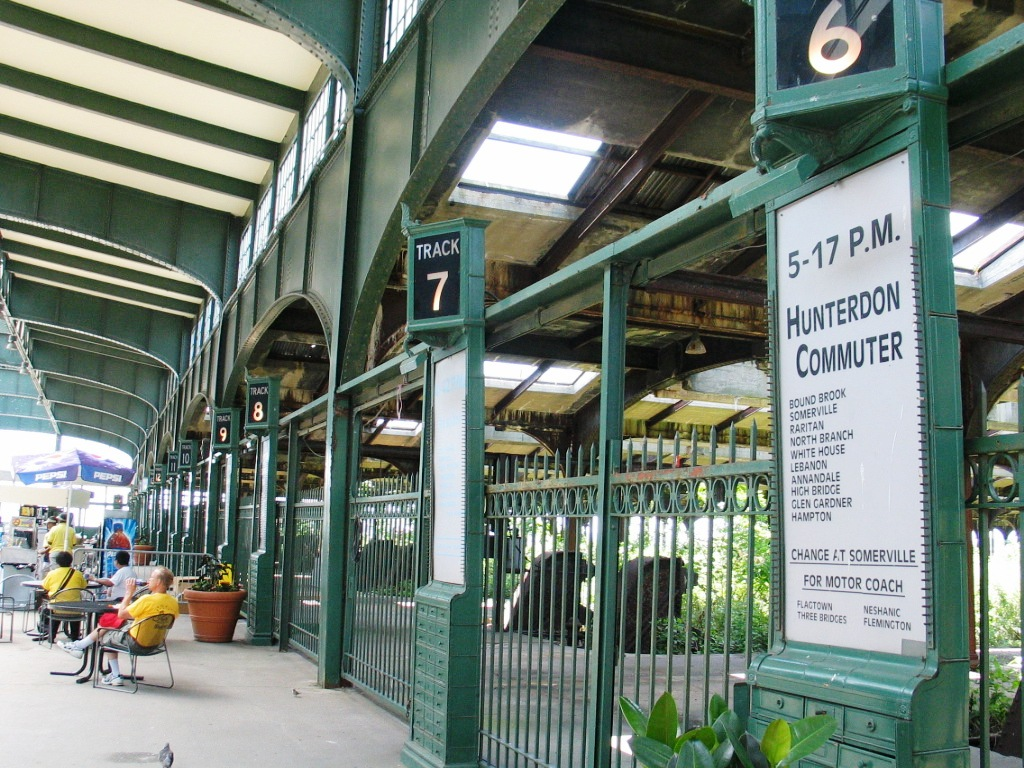
The concourse at Communipaw Terminal

The terminal is part of Liberty State Park, and along with nearby Ellis Island and Statue of Liberty recalls the era of massive immigration through the Port of New York and New Jersey. It is estimated that around 10.5 million immigrants that were processed at Ellis Island entered the country through the station. The area has long been known as Communipaw, which in the Lenape language means big landing place at the side of a river. The first stop west of the station was indeed called Communipaw, and was not far from the village that had been established there in 1634 as part of the New Netherland settlement of Pavonia. The land on which the extensive yards were built was reclaimed, or filled. The terminal itself is next to the Morris Canal Big Basin, which to some degree was made obsolete by the railroads which replaced it. The long cobbled road which ends at the terminal (once called Johnston Avenue for a president of CNJ) is named Audrey Zapp Drive, after the environmentalist active in the creation of the park.

The main building is designed in a Richardsonian Romanesque style. The intermodal facility contains more than a dozen platforms and several ferry slips. Arriving passengers would walk to the railhead concourse and could either pass through its main waiting room, by-pass it on either side, and take stairs to the upper level. The ferry slips have also been restored though the structure which housed them has been removed, as have the tracks. The Bush-type trainsheds, the largest ever to be constructed and designed by A. Lincoln Bush, were not part of the original construction, but were built in 1914 and have not been restored. The abandoned shed covered 12 platforms and 20 tracks.

== Service ==
=== Trackage ===
The terminal, along with its docks and yards, was one of several massive terminal complexes (the other being the terminals of the Pennsylvania Railroad in Exchange Place, the Erie Railroad Terminal in Pavonia, the Lackawanna Railroad Terminal in Hoboken, and the West Shore Railroad Terminal in Weehawken) that dominated the western waterfront of the New York Harbor from the mid 19th to the mid 20th century. Of the two still standing, the Hoboken Terminal (the former Lackwanna Railroad Terminal) is the only one still in use. Lines from the station headed to the southwest. Arriving at the waterfront from the points required overcoming significant natural obstacles including crossing the Hackensack River and Meadows and Hudson Palisades, and in the case of New Jersey Central, traversing the Newark Bay. For its mainline, the railroad constructed the Newark Bay Bridge to Elizabeth. Its Newark and New York Branch cut through Bergen Hill and crossed two bridges at Kearny Point. Both rights-of-way in Hudson County are now used by the Hudson Bergen Light Rail, one terminating at West Side Avenue and the other at 8th Street station in Bayonne.

=== Ferries and ships ===
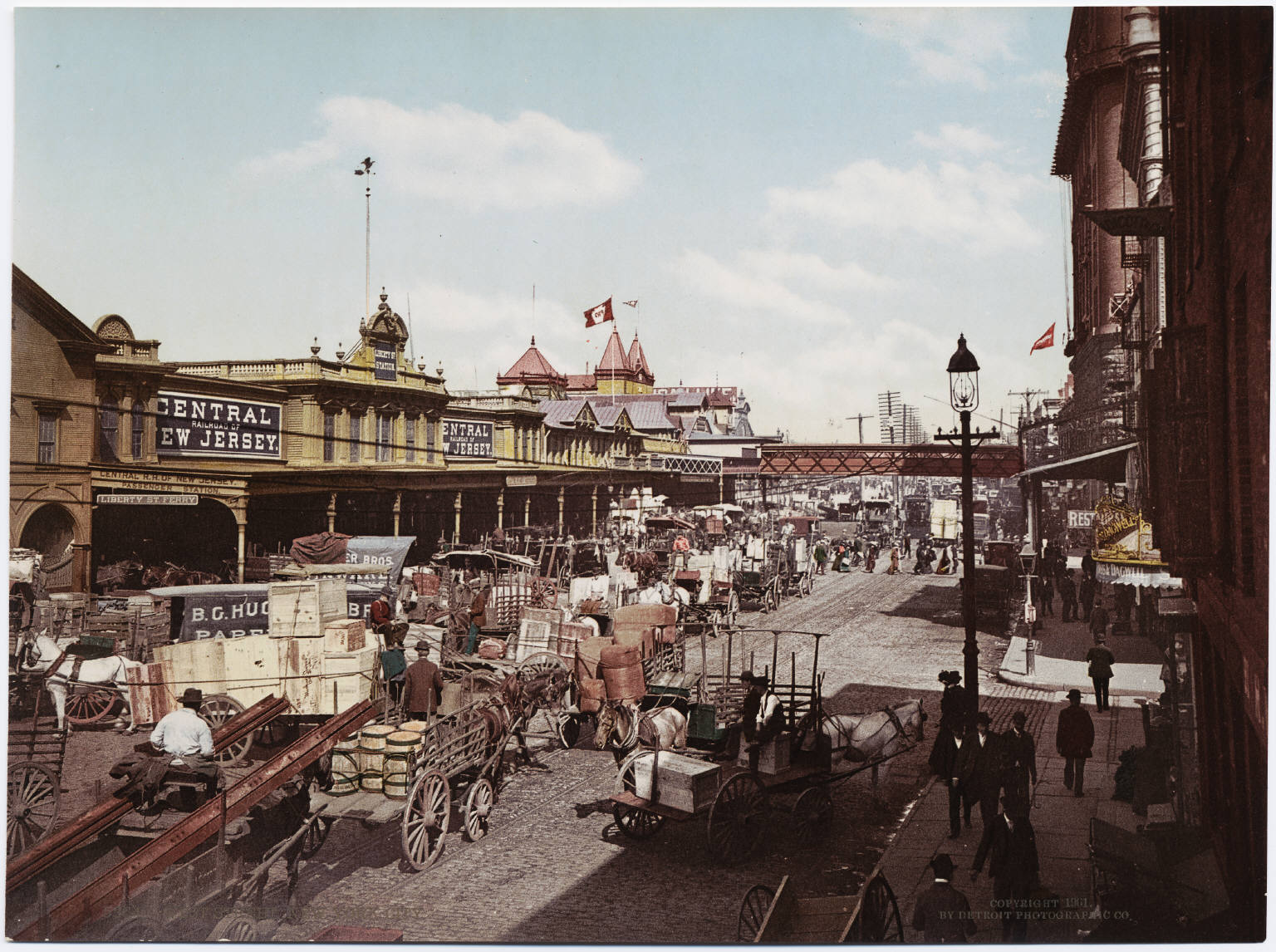
Central Railroad of New Jersey's Liberty Street Ferry Terminal in New York City, circa 1900

The Communipaw ferry constituted the main ferry route from the terminal and was operated by four ferries that crossed the North River to Liberty Street Ferry Terminal in lower Manhattan. Additional service to 23rd Street was also operated until the CRNJ went bankrupt in 1945 and scrapped its ferry boats used on the 23rd street route in 1947. In the early 1900s the B&O Railroad requested the CRNJ operate ferries for its luxury Royal Blue service passengers to Whitehall Terminal and this was accomplished for several years until the City of New York purchased the Staten Island Ferry from the B&O's subsidiary, the Staten Island Railway, and ended the service in 1905. Until the opening of the Verrazzano–Narrows Bridge there was also service to Brooklyn and Staten Island Other boats, among them the SS Asbury Park and SS Sandy Hook, which travelled to the Raritan Bayshore.

In 1941, the CRRNJ ferryboat fleet made 374 one-way crossings of the North River each day.

=== Railroad lines ===
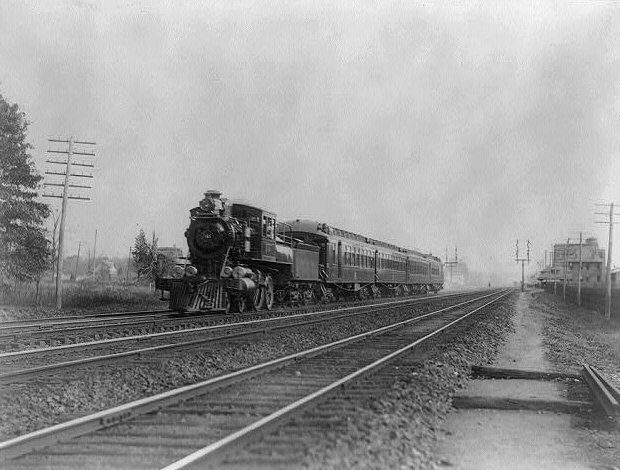
The famed Royal Limited, which provided luxury service between Jersey City Terminal and Washington, D.C. and made the journey in under five hours, pictured in 1898

Jersey Central's Blue Comet offered elaborate service to Atlantic City. The railroad's suburban trains served passengers to west and south, including the Jersey Shore. CNJ's long-distance service into Pennsylvania ran to Harrisburg, Scranton, and present-day Jim Thorpe, then known as Mauch Chunk.

The Reading Company used the terminal for its Crusader and Wall Street trains. The Baltimore and Ohio Railroad (B&O), whose Royal Blue was a premier passenger train to Washington, D.C., and offered train service to Chicago and St. Louis.

In April 1967, the opening of the Aldene Connection led to the end of passenger service to the station and the diverting of all remaining passenger trains to Penn Station in Newark. Since then, Hoboken Terminal has served as the main commuter rail station for Jersey City, and straddles the Jersey City/Hoboken line.

The timetable of September 27, 1936 shows 132 weekday departures, including 25 to CNJ's Broad St. Newark station, 25 that ran south from Elizabethport, two to Chrome and the rest to the NY&LB, and 19 Reading and B&O trains that turned southwest at Bound Brook Junction. Three trains ran to Mauch Chunk and two to Harrisburg via Allentown; the other 58 trains terminated along the main line between West 8th St in Bayonne and Hampton.

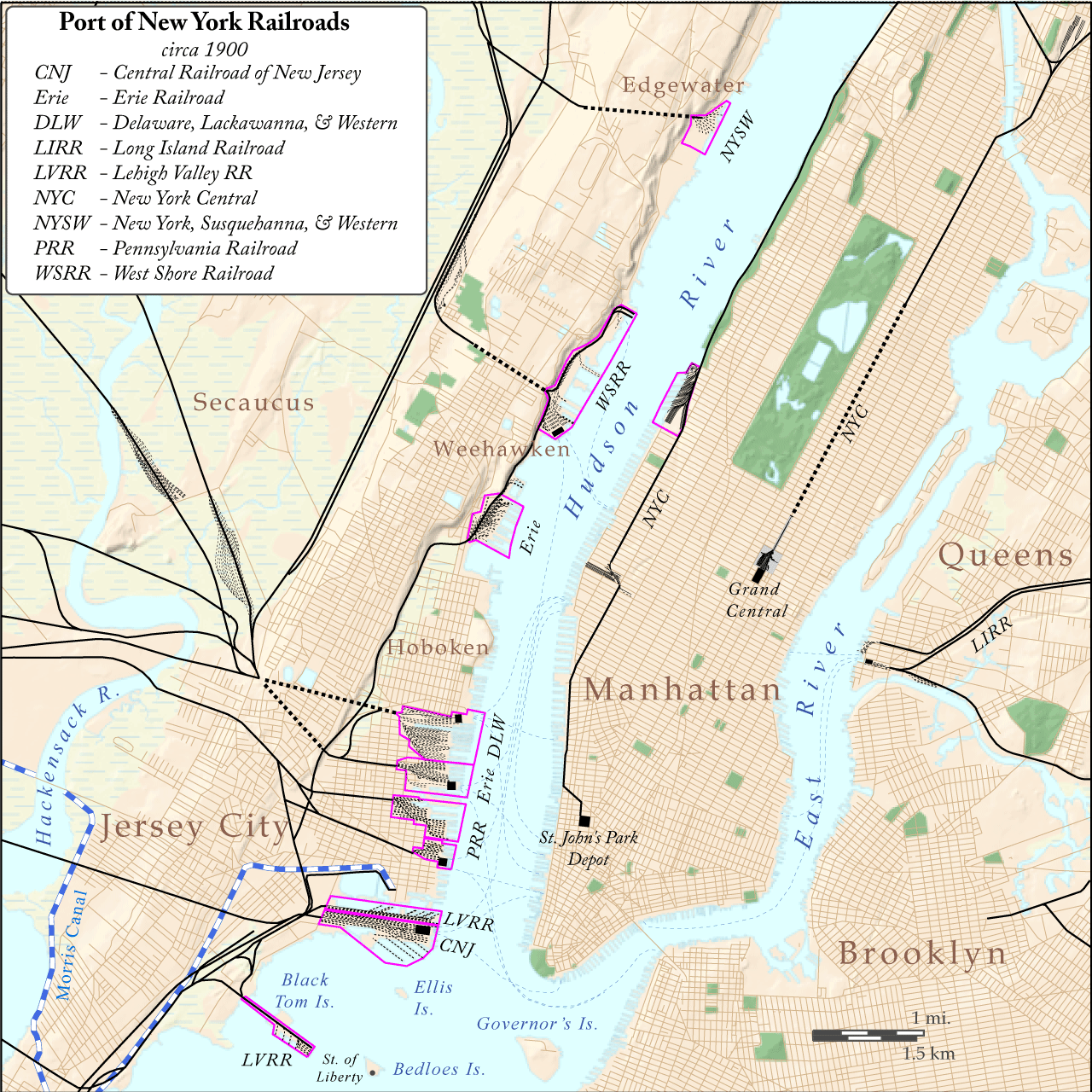
Map of the five train-to-ferry transfer points along the west shore of the Hudson River circa 1900

=== Named passenger trains ===
Until April 1958, several long-distance trains originated at the station, and trains to Philadelphia lasted until 1967.

Operators	Named trains	Destination	Year begun	Year discontinued
Baltimore and Ohio	Capitol Limited	Chicago via Washington, D.C. and Pittsburgh	1923	1958*
Baltimore and Ohio	Columbian	Chicago via Washington, D.C. and Pittsburgh	1931	1958*
Baltimore and Ohio	Diplomat	St. Louis via Washington, D.C. and Cincinnati	1920s	1958*
Baltimore and Ohio	Metropolitan Special (Washington Night Express from Jersey City to Baltimore, meeting with the Metropolitan Special)	St. Louis via Washington, D.C. and Cincinnati	ca. 1920	1958*
Baltimore and Ohio	National Limited	St. Louis via Washington, D.C. and Cincinnati	1925	1958*
Baltimore and Ohio	Royal Blue	Washington, D.C.	1890	1958*
Baltimore and Ohio	Shenandoah	Chicago via Washington, D.C. and Pittsburgh	1930s	1958*
Baltimore and Ohio	Washington Night Express	Washington, D.C.	1947	1952
Central Railroad of New Jersey	Blue Comet	Atlantic City, New Jersey	1929	1941
Central Railroad of New Jersey	Bullet	Wilkes-Barre, Pennsylvania	1929	1931
Reading Railroad with the Central Railroad of New Jersey	Crusader	Philadelphia	1937	1967
Reading Railroad with the Central Railroad of New Jersey	Harrisburg Special	Harrisburg, Pennsylvania	1910	1953
Reading Railroad with the Central Railroad of New Jersey	Queen of the Valley	Harrisburg	1902	1967
Reading Railroad with the Central Railroad of New Jersey	Wall Street	Philadelphia	1948	1968
Reading Railroad with the Central Railroad of New Jersey	Williamsporter	Williamsport, Pennsylvania	1931	1944

* With the closing of Baltimore & Ohio passenger service north of Baltimore in 1958 the Royal Blue was abandoned and the Capitol Limited, Metropolitan Special and National Limited were terminated east of Baltimore.

== Post-railroad service uses ==
Following the Aldene Connection's opening in 1967, the terminal sat unused but maintained and guarded by the Central Railroad of New Jersey. When CNJ shops and engine facilities nearby closed in the early 1970s, the terminal sat abandoned.

A portion of the 1968 movie Funny Girl was filmed at the terminal. Numerous fairs, concerts, and other sponsored events (among them the Central Jersey Heritage Festival and the All Points West Music & Arts Festival) take place at the station and its grounds. It is a very popular place from which to view July 4 fireworks. In the aftermath of the September 11 attacks, its parking lot was the staging area for dozens of ambulances that were mobilized to transport victims of the attacks.

Ferries to the Statue of Liberty National Monument, Ellis Island, and Liberty Island depart daily. Since 2024, a free shuttle bus service operates on weekends and holidays from April to November connecting the terminal to various points of interest within the park and to the Hudson Bergen Light Rail's Liberty State Park Station and the 16 NJ Transit Bus route. In 2009 Rutgers University students proposed building a trolley line to the terminal building and other points in the park from the light rail station to improve access.

The terminal was badly damaged by flooding during Hurricane Sandy in 2012 and was reopened in 2016.

On Election Day 2020, an episode of the political program Fox & Friends was filmed in a portable studio placed outside the terminal. Promotional footage for the episode frequently features the terminal.

== Gallery ==
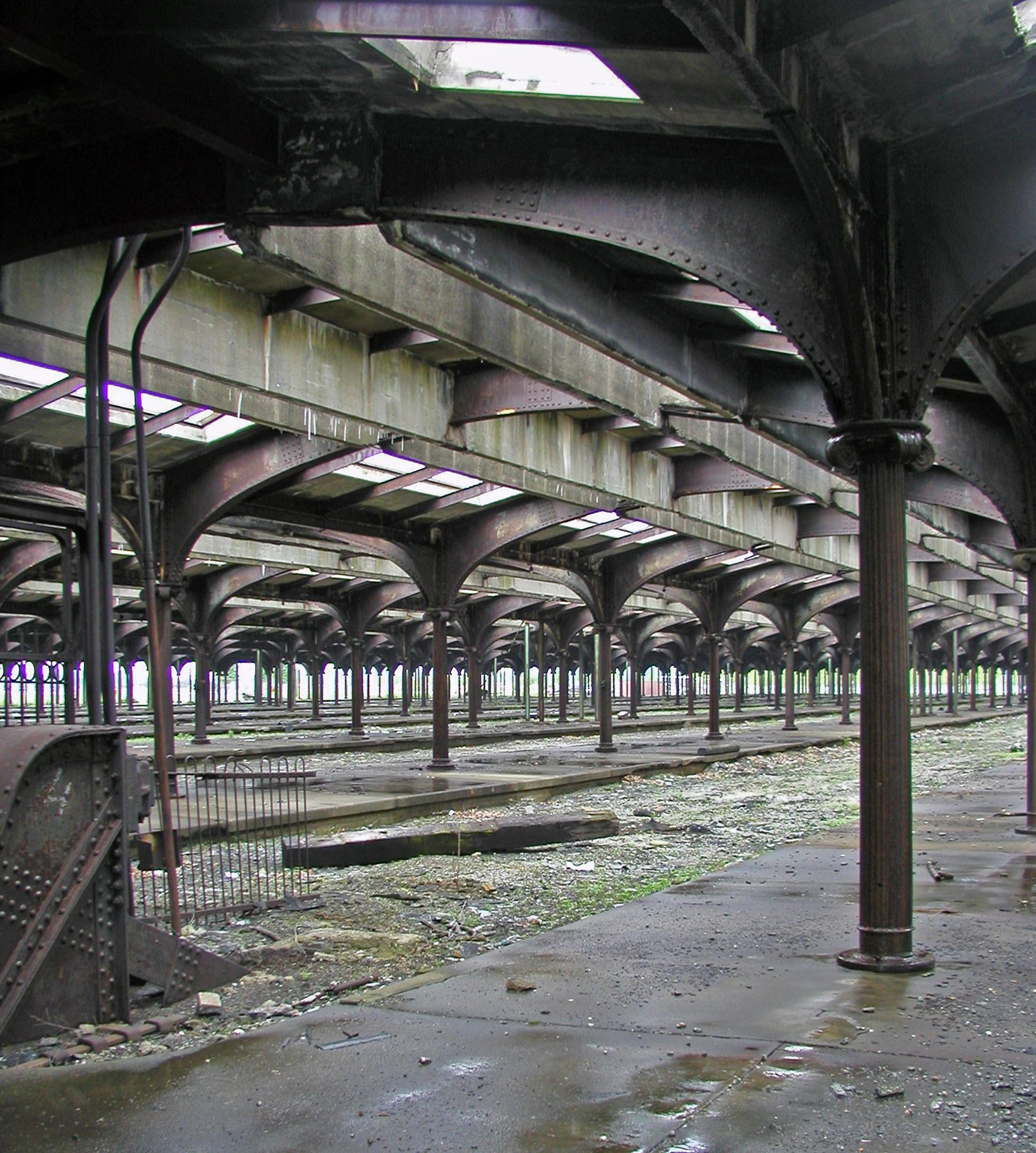
Bush shed at Central Railroad of New Jersey Terminal in Jersey City, New Jersey, the largest ever built

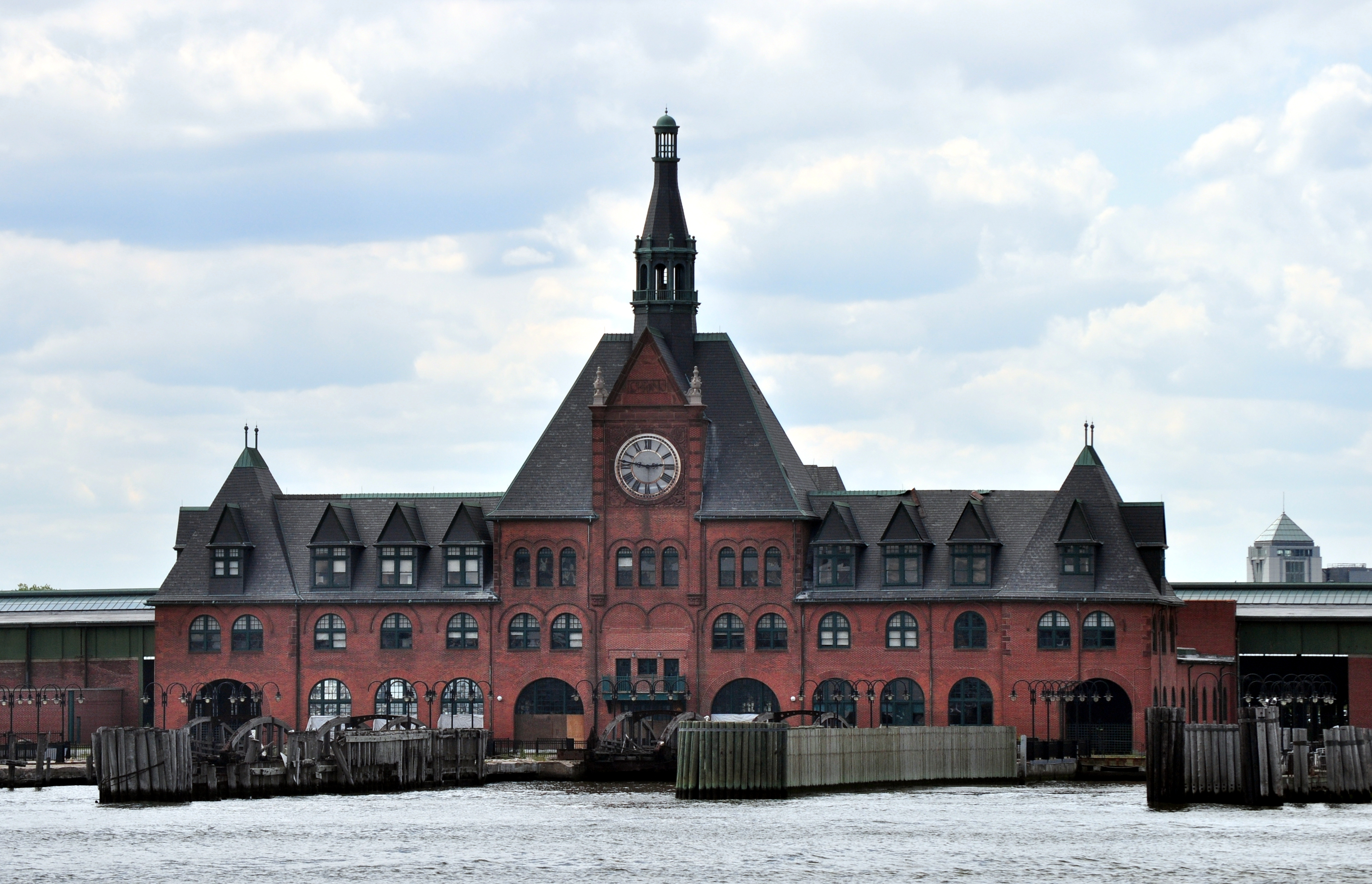
Central Railroad of New Jersey Terminal from the water in 2013

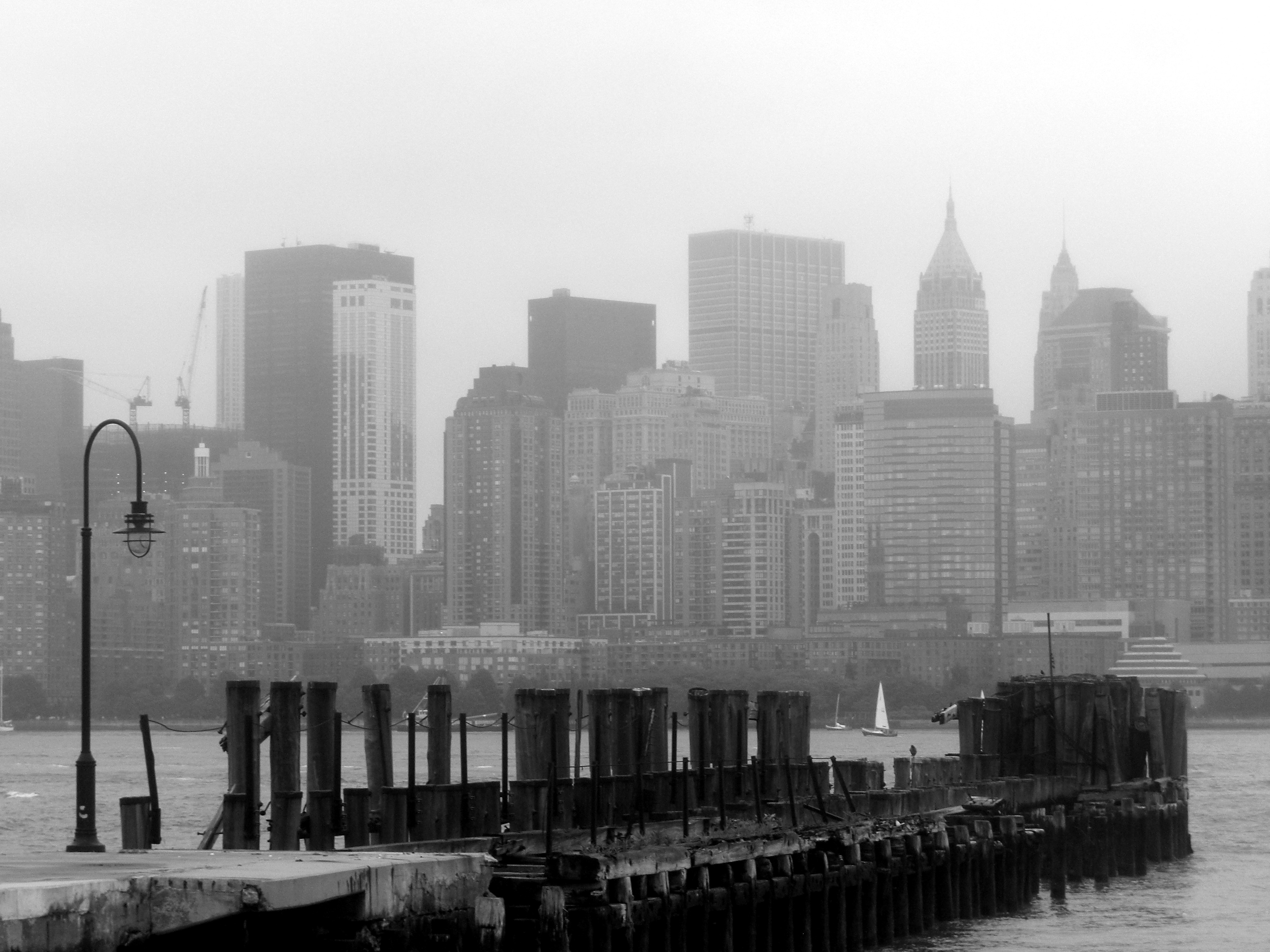
The old ferry docks at the terminal

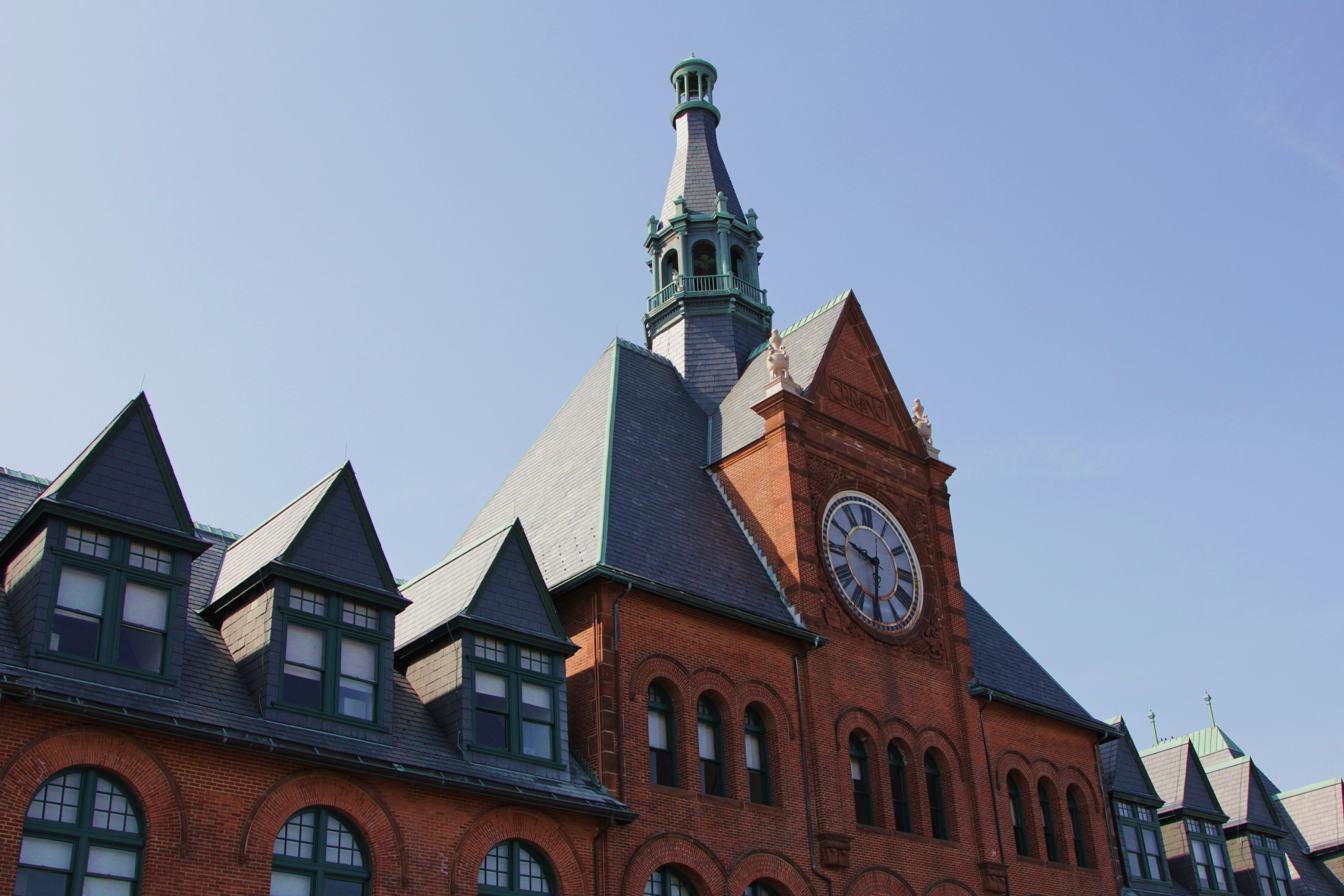
The upper façade of the terminal

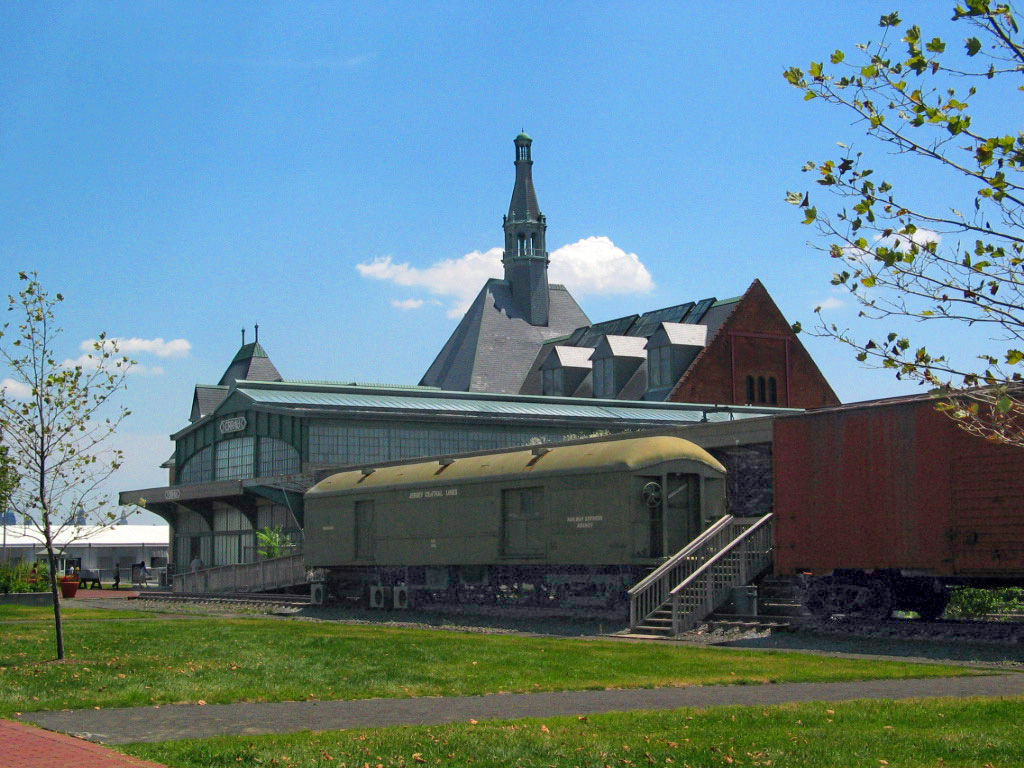
The grounds on the north side of the terminal

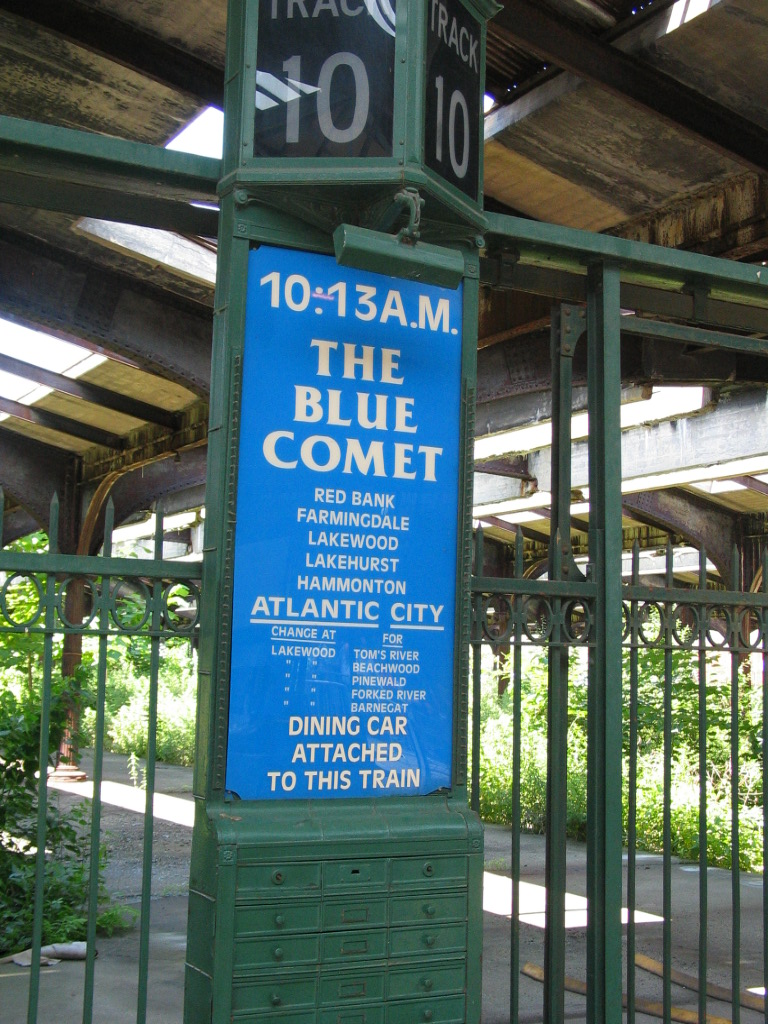
A reproduction of a tablet designator for the Blue Comet

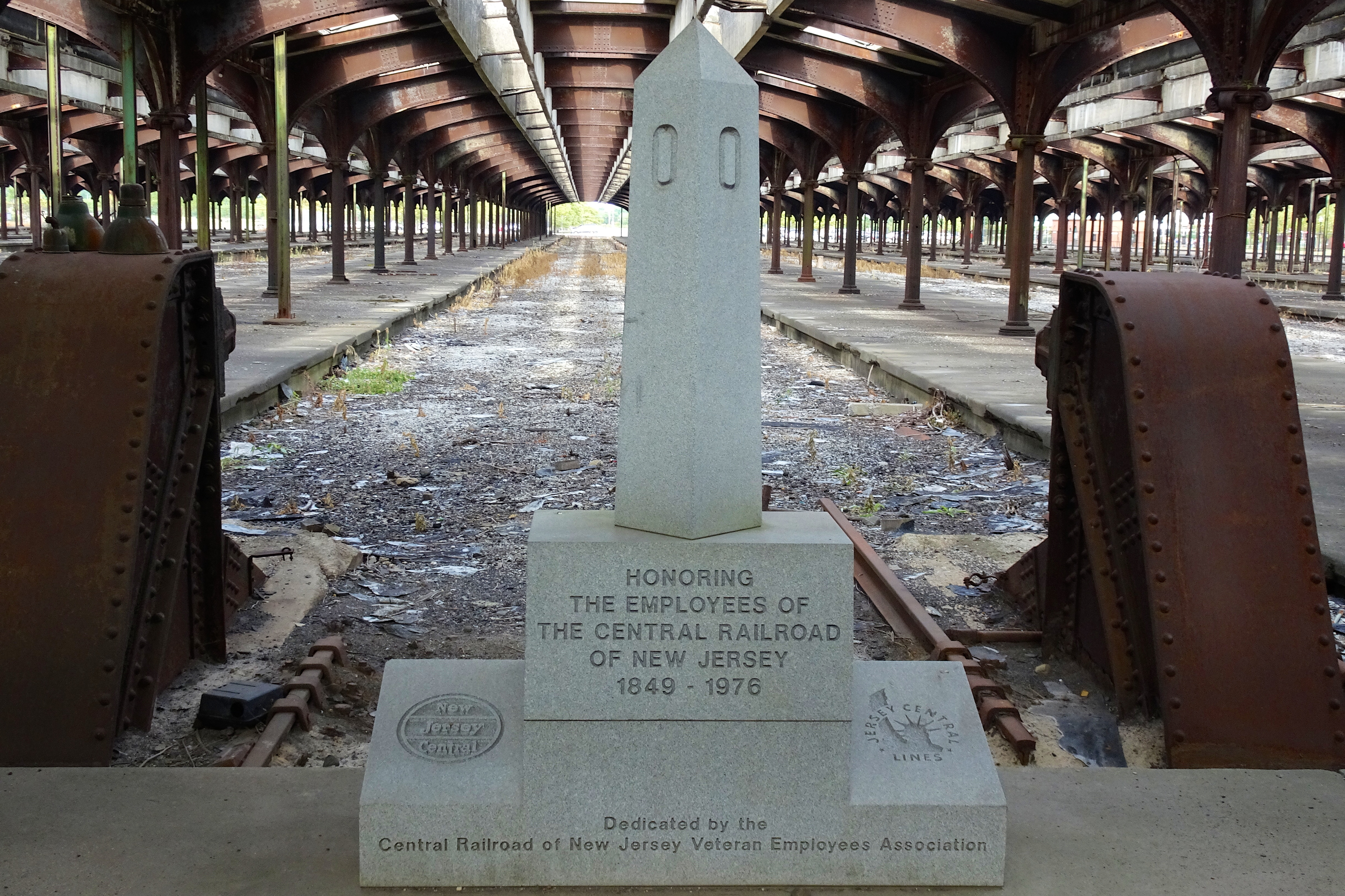
Memorial to the employees at milepost 0

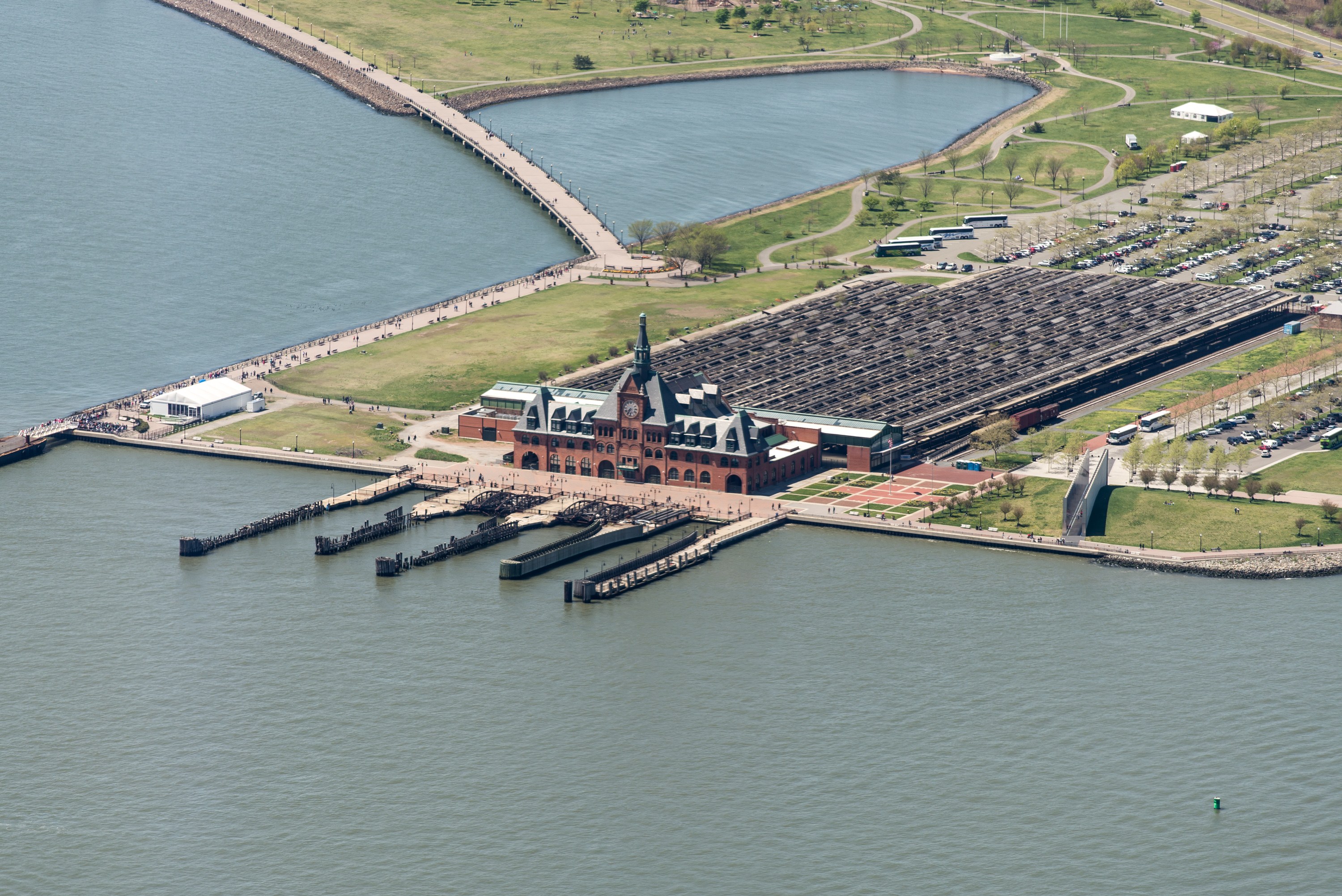
Overview of the terminal and train sheds

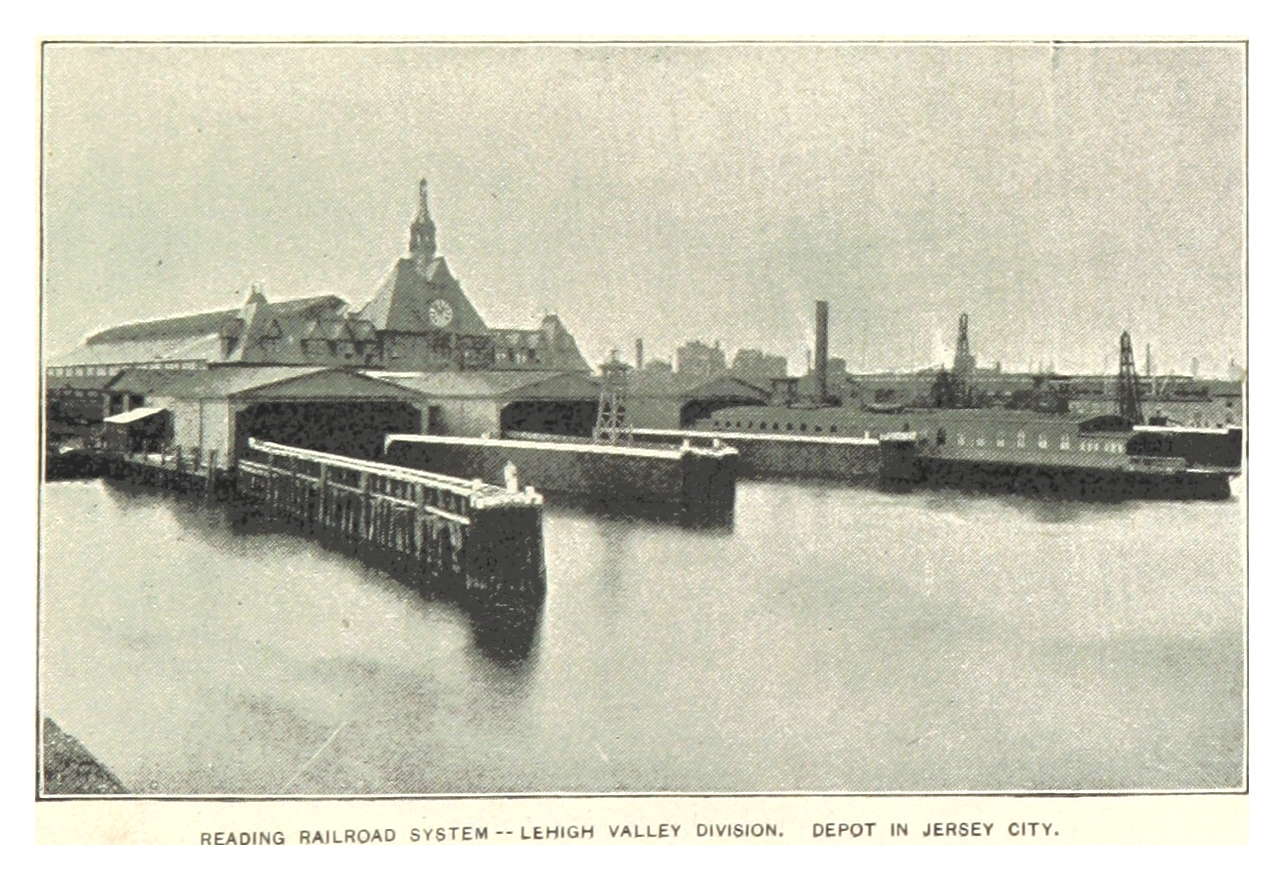
The terminal in 1893

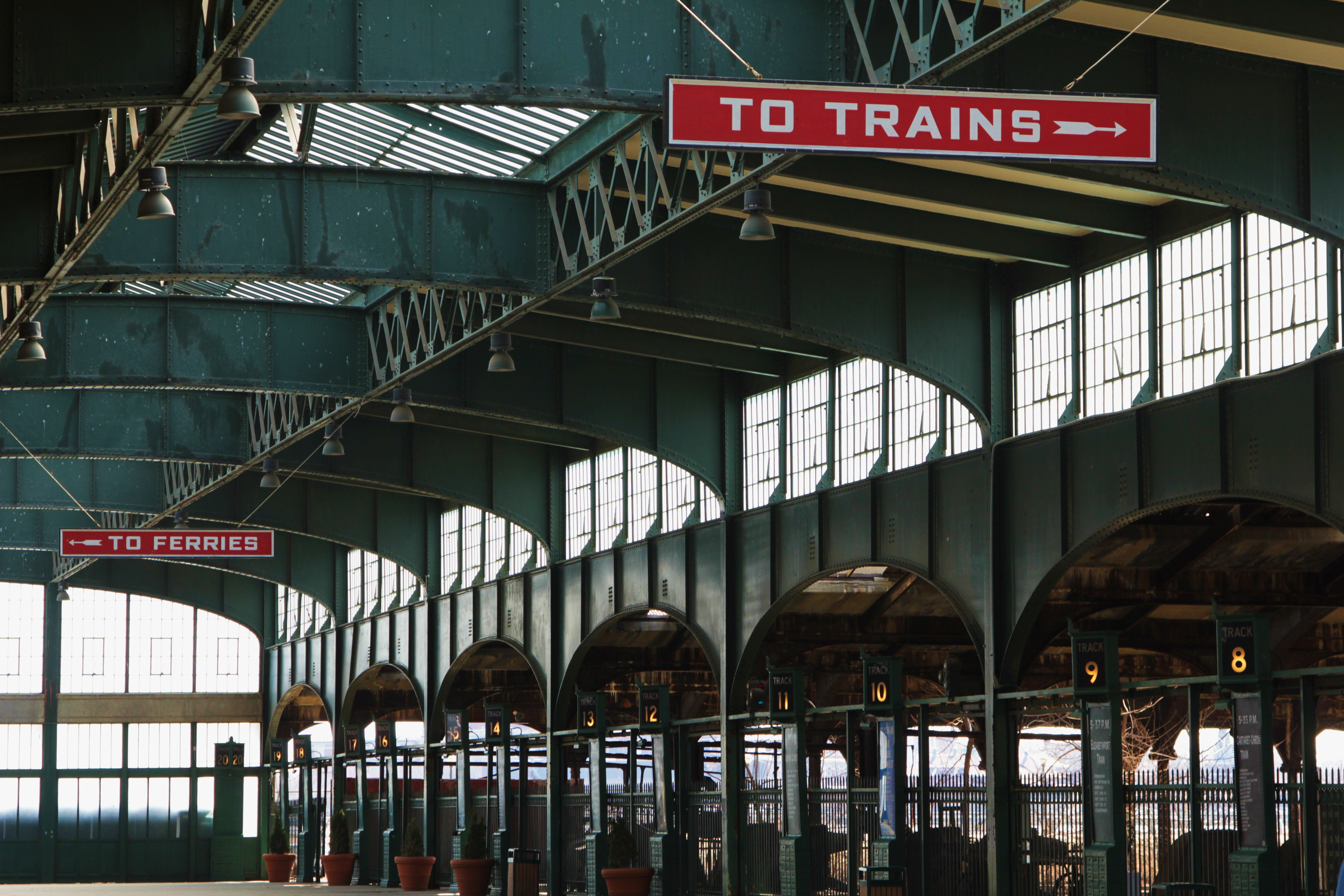
Inside Communipaw Terminal

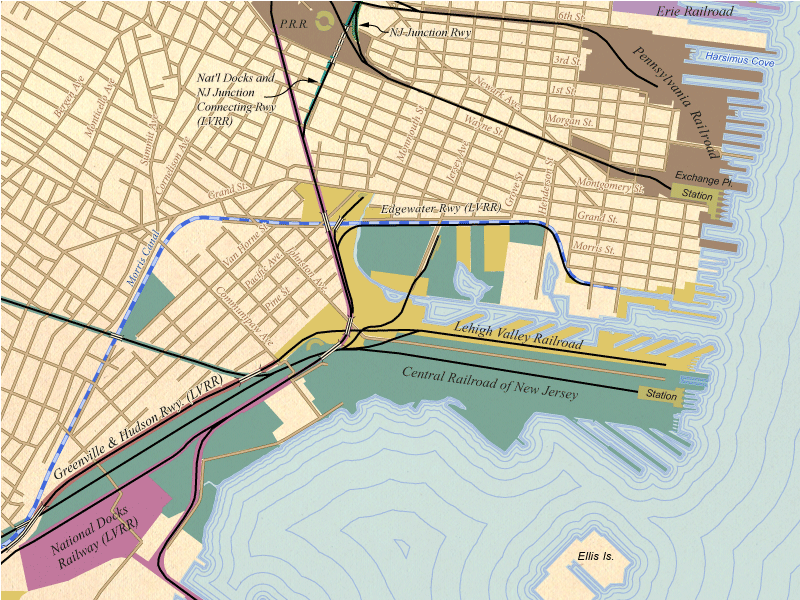
Map showing the terminal facility in 1910

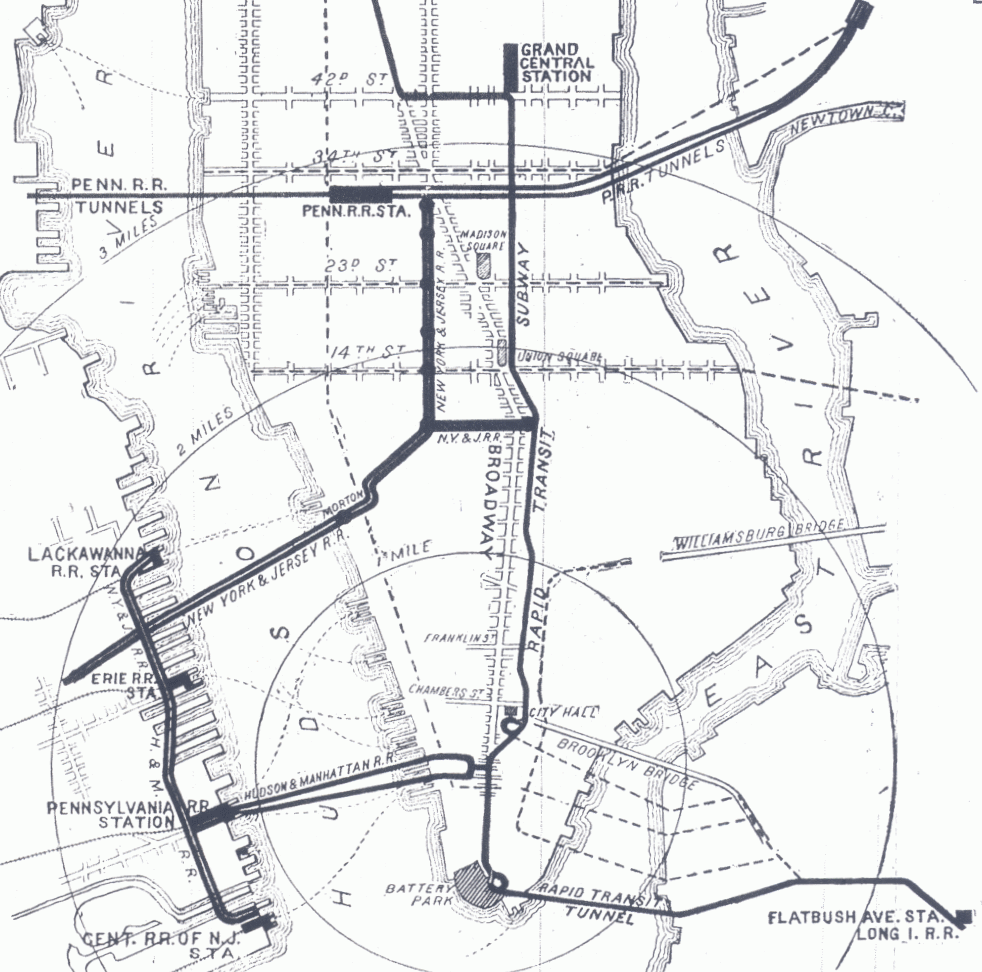
Plans to extend the Hudson Tubes, which never materialized

Map of lines approaching the Hudson waterfront from the south; the grey Central New Jersey line from Bayonne to Elizabeth was carried by Newark Bay Bridge

== See also ==
- National Register of Historic Places listings in Hudson County, New Jersey
- Operating Passenger Railroad Stations Thematic Resource (New Jersey)
- Timeline of Jersey City area railroads
- List of ferries across the Hudson River in New York City
- List of stations on the Central Railroad of New Jersey
- National Limited
- Central Railroad of New Jersey Freight Station
- Newark Bay, New Jersey rail accident
- Newark and New York Railroad Bridge
