= National Limited =

Former Baltimore and Ohio Railroad train

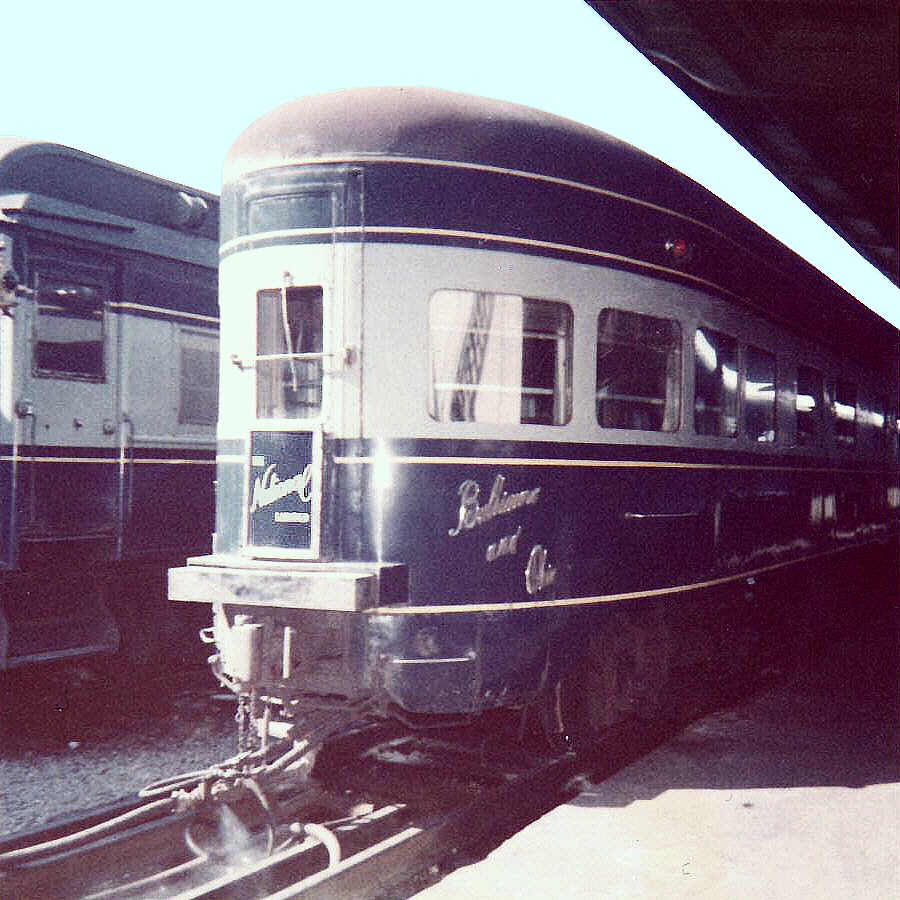
- The Baltimore and Ohio Railroad's National Limited observation car with drumhead at Union Station (Washington, D.C.), in 1961. The car is one of three acquired from the New York Central Railroad in 1956.
Route map
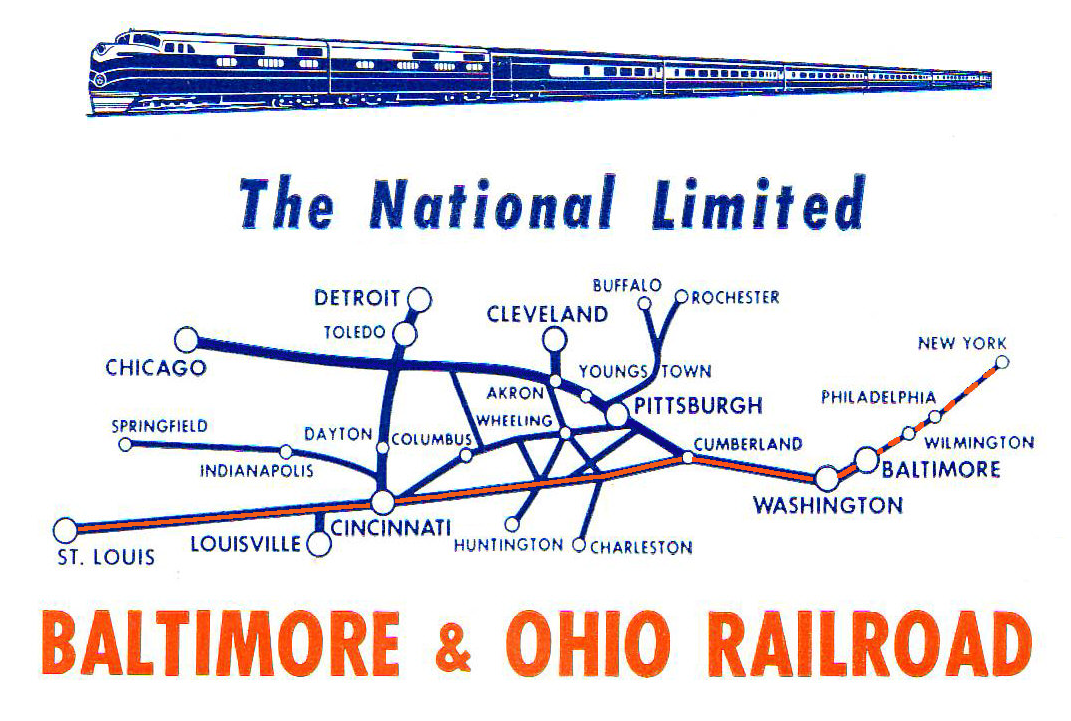

The National Limited was the premier train of the Baltimore and Ohio Railroad (B&O) on its route between Jersey City, New Jersey, and St. Louis, Missouri, with major station stops in Washington, D.C., and Cincinnati, Ohio. (Buses took passengers from New York City to Hudson River ferries; the travelers would transfer onto trains in Communipaw Terminal in Jersey City.) It operated from 1925 to 1971. For much of its life it offered exclusive all-Pullman service, and it was the first long-distance train to be entirely air-conditioned. The National Limited was one of many trains discontinued when Amtrak began operations on May 1, 1971. Amtrak revived the name for another New York–St. Louis service which did not use the B&O route.

== History ==
The B&O had previously operated through cars between New York and western points as the National Limited since December 1916. The all-Pullman version of the National Limited was introduced by the B&O on April 26, 1925, as trains Nos. 1 (westbound) and 2 (eastbound). B&O's New York terminus was actually in Jersey City, New Jersey, at the Central Railroad of New Jersey Terminal. Passengers were then transferred to buses that met the train at the platform. These buses were then ferried across the Hudson River to Manhattan Island, where they proceeded to various "stations" including the Vanderbilt Hotel, Wanamaker's, Columbus Circle, and Rockefeller Center, as well as into Brooklyn.

The National Limited traversed some of the most challenging terrain in eastern railroading. It ascended the Appalachian Mountains in western Maryland and West Virginia. Even through the diesel era, extra motive power was added at the head-end to take the train over these ridges, which meant extra stops on both sides of the mountain heights to add and remove assisting locomotives.

The National Limited was originally an all-Pullman train in the 1920s and 1930s. In addition to compartment and drawing-room sleeping cars, it featured a club car, observation library lounge car, and a full-service dining car. Onboard amenities for the deluxe train's clientele included a secretary, barber, valet, maid, manicure, and shower baths. On April 20, 1932, it became the first long-distance train to be entirely air conditioned. Connections with southwestern railroads, including the Missouri Pacific, Missouri-Kansas-Texas, Cotton Belt, and the Frisco, were made at St. Louis Union Station.

In 1939–1940, the National Limited was streamlined and dieselized. In the 1950s, coaches were added to the train's consist, and a Slumbercoach was first used on this train in 1959.

=== Decline and end ===
The National Limited, like most named trains in the U.S. by the late 1950s, suffered steadily-declining patronage as the traveling public abandoned trains in favor of airplanes and the automobile. The B&O gave up on competing with the Pennsylvania Railroad into New York, discontinuing all passenger service north of Baltimore on April 26, 1958. The National Limited's eastern terminus then became Baltimore, providing through service as Train #1 between Baltimore and St. Louis, via Washington and Cincinnati.

Beginning September 7, 1965, the National Limited's through Washington to St. Louis coaches and sleeping cars were handled between Washington and Cincinnati on the by-then affiliated Chesapeake and Ohio Railway (C&O) rails, combined with C&O Train #1, the George Washington. Thereafter, a downgraded coach-only National Limited train #131 was operated on B&O rails between Baltimore and Cincinnati, making local stops.

In 1967, the United States Post Office dealt a heavy blow to the B&O and other US railroads by cancelling most of their lucrative mail contracts. Most of the train's route through West Virginia, southern Ohio, and south-central Indiana and Illinois was, and continues to be, sparsely populated. Few cities or towns existed along the line that could contribute additional revenue or passengers to the train; indeed, it had never profited from high ridership even in its golden age. Between Cincinnati and St. Louis, the B&O St. Louis line was single-tracked, and it avoided most of the larger Midwestern cities along the way. While branch lines ran to Columbus, Dayton, Louisville, Indianapolis, Springfield, and other cities and towns, the National Limited bypassed them all. This ultimately would seal the train's fate. The B&O's National Limited had its final run on April 30, 1971, when Amtrak took over most passenger routes in the United States but did not continue any B&O trains at the outset. In 1981, however, it revived the Capitol Limited for the portion of its route east of Pittsburgh.

=== Amtrak ===
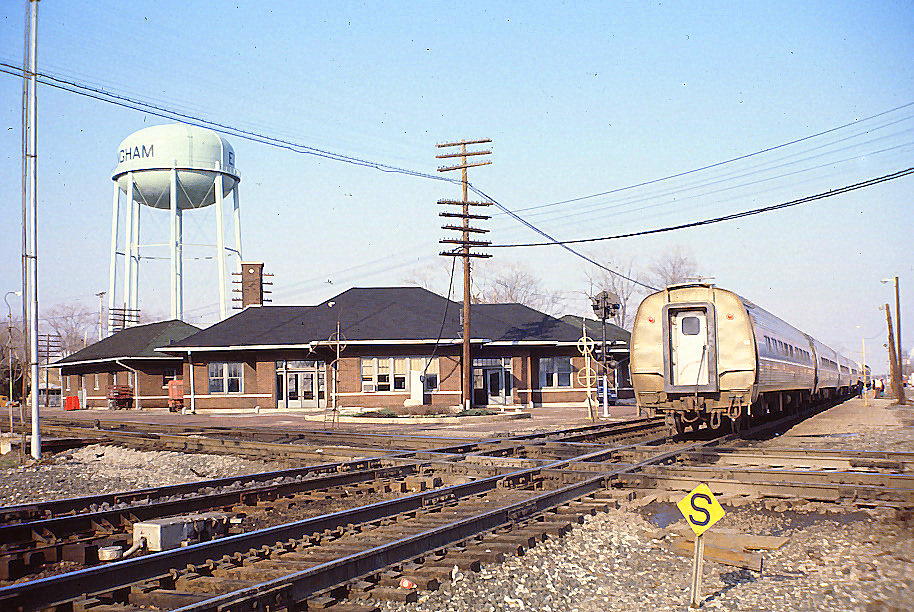
Amtrak's National Limited at Effingham, Illinois in 1979.

The National Limited name was subsequently revived by Amtrak for a train from New York to Kansas City, Missouri, via Harrisburg, Pittsburgh, Columbus, Dayton, Indianapolis, and St. Louis. This Amtrak train did not use the B&O route, instead being the successor of the old Pennsylvania Railroad mainstay, Spirit of St. Louis: the principal rival of the old National Limited. After being plagued by numerous delays caused by deteriorating Penn Central track in the Midwest, it was canceled on October 1, 1979.

Amtrak's Shenandoah served the National Limited B&O route from Washington to Cincinnati via Cumberland, Maryland, and Parkersburg, West Virginia, from October 31, 1976, to September 30, 1981.

== Stations ==
Station	State
New York (Rockefeller Center) (bus)	New York
New York (42nd Street Station) (bus)	New York
Brooklyn (bus)	New York
New York (Columbus Circle Station) (bus)	New York
Jersey City (Communipaw Terminal)	New Jersey
Elizabeth (CNJ's Elizabeth Station)	New Jersey
Wayne Junction station	Pennsylvania
Philadelphia (Chestnut Street Station)	Pennsylvania
Wilmington	Delaware
Baltimore (Mt. Royal Station)	Maryland
Baltimore (Camden Station)	Maryland
Washington (Union Station)	District of Columbia
Cumberland (Queen City Station)	Maryland
Parkersburg	West Virginia
Athens station (Ohio)	Ohio
Chillicothe	Ohio
Cincinnati (Union Terminal)	Ohio
Louisville (Central Station)	Kentucky
St. Louis (Union Station)	Missouri

== Route and equipment ==
City	Departure time
New York (Rockefeller Center)	12 noon
New York (42nd Street Station)	12 noon
Brooklyn, NY	12 noon
New York (42nd Street Station)	12:05 p.m.
Jersey City, NJ (CNJ station)	12:55 p.m.
Elizabeth, NJ (CNJ station)	1:11 p.m.
Philadelphia, Pa. (B&O station)	2:37 p.m.
Wilmington, Del.	3:05 p.m.
Baltimore, Md. (Mt. Royal Station)	4:16 p.m.
Baltimore, Md. (Camden Station)	4:25 p.m.
Washington, D.C. (Union Station)	5:30 p.m.
Cincinnati (Union Terminal)	6:15 a.m.
Louisville, Ky. (Central Station)	9:55 a.m.
St. Louis (Union Station)	12 noon
source: Baltimore and Ohio System Timetable, July 6, 1947

Sample consist
June 28, 1940
- Location: Washington, D.C.
- Train: Westbound #1
- EMC EA #53; EMC EB #53X; Baggage-dormitory-buffet-lounge #1302; Coach #3550 (54 seats); Coach #3554 (54 seats); Dining car-lounge #1077; Sleeper-buffet-lounge Merchants Club (8 sections); Sleeping car East Akron (12 sections, 1 drawing room); Sleeping car Emerald Brook (8 sections, 4 double bedrooms); Sleeping car Loch Earn (10 sections, 1 drawing room, 2 compartments); Sleeper-buffet-observation Palm Islands (1 drawing room, 3 compartments)

In 1947, westbound National Limited #1 departed Jersey City at 12:55 p.m. and arrived in St. Louis at noon the following day, covering the schedule in roughly 24 hours. The table at right indicates stops made (departure times at principal stops shown; yellow indicates transport by bus).

In 1940 the National Limited received refurbished streamlined heavyweight equipment, similar to what the Capitol Limited had received in 1938. The consist included coaches, sleeping cars in various configurations, a dining car, a buffet-lounge, and a buffet-lounge-observation car. In 1941 these cars were augmented by several lightweight 10-roomette 5-bedroom sleeping cars.

In January 1956 the B&O acquired three River-series sleeper-buffet-lounge-observation cars originally built in 1939 by Pullman-Standard for the New York Central Railroad. These had previously served on the 20th Century Limited among other trains. Each car contained a compartment, drawing room, and two double bedrooms. In 1959 the B&O added three slumbercoaches to the National Limited's equipment pool: the Restland (#7702), Sleepland (#7703), and Thriftland (#7704).
