= Baltimore & Ohio Railroad station (Philadelphia) =

Former Philadelphia railway station (closed 1958)

Coordinates: 39°57′07″N 75°10′49″W

Philadelphia
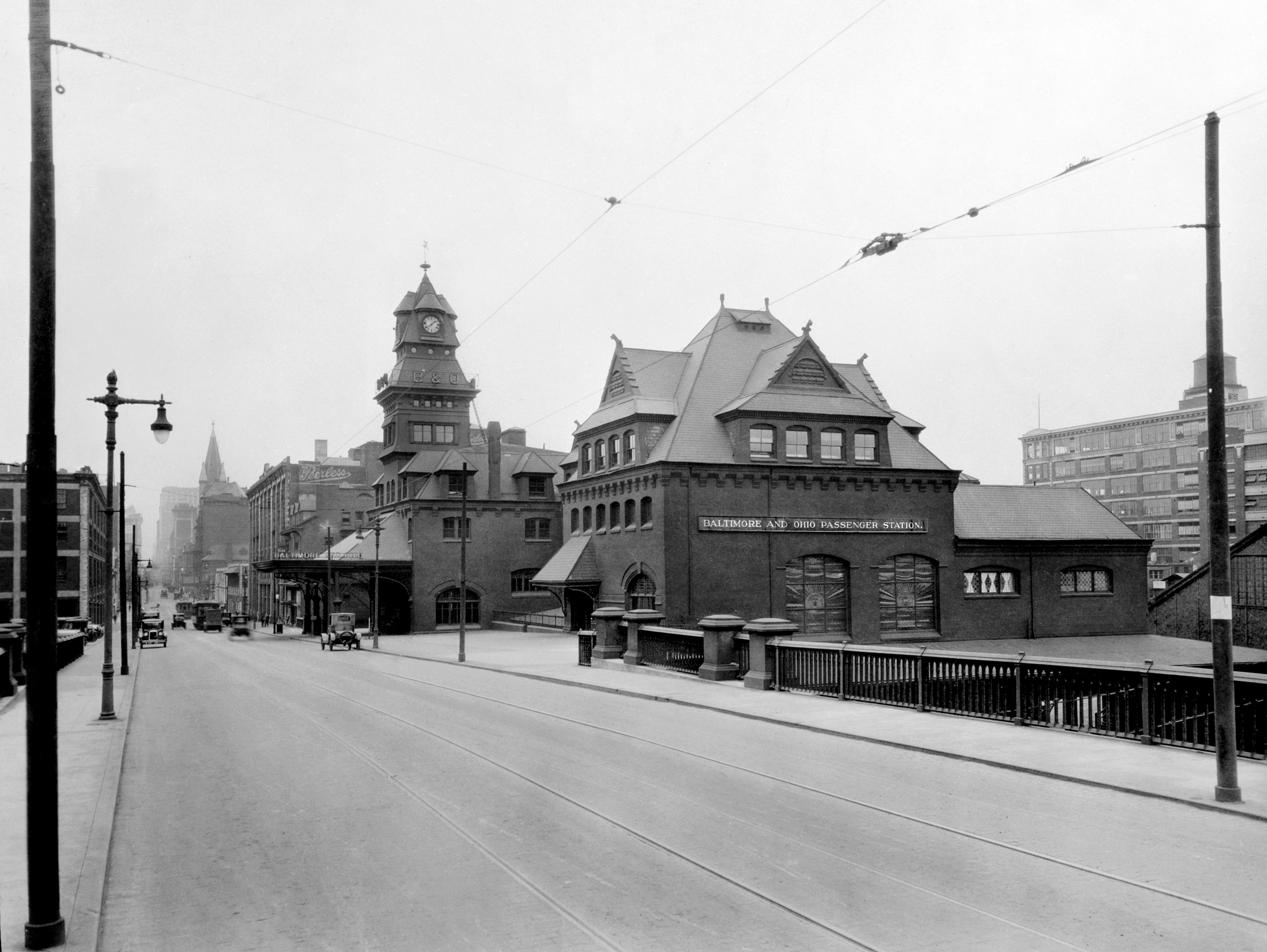
- From the Chestnut Street Bridge, circa 1910

General information
- Location: 24th and Chestnut Sts., Philadelphia, Pennsylvania, U.S.
- Line: Baltimore and Ohio Railroad

History
- Opened: 1888
- Closed: 1958

Former services
Preceding station	Baltimore and Ohio Railroad	Following station
Wilmington (B&O) toward Chicago	Main Line	Wayne Junction toward Jersey City
60th Street toward Chicago	Main Line	Wayne Junction toward Jersey City
Terminus	Philadelphia – Jersey City Local	Wayne Junction toward Jersey City
Location

Philadelphia's Baltimore and Ohio Railroad station – also known as the B & O station or Chestnut Street station – was the main passenger station for the Baltimore and Ohio Railroad in Philadelphia, Pennsylvania. Designed by architect Frank Furness in 1886, it stood at 24th Street and the Chestnut Street Bridge from 1888 to 1963.

== History ==
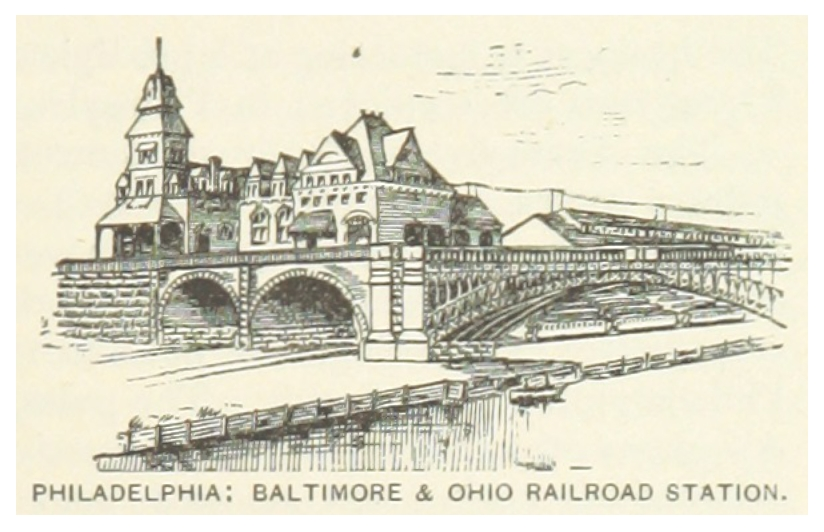
Illustration from 1891

The B&O Railroad completed the Philadelphia Subdivision in 1886, its own line between Baltimore and Philadelphia that did not rely on Pennsylvania Railroad routes. Relying on Reading Railroad and Central Railroad of New Jersey routes between Philadelphia and Jersey City, New Jersey, (opposite New York City), the B&O could provide direct service to the New York City area.

=== Architecture ===
Mr. Frank Furness, the architect, says that the new Baltimore and Ohio depot, to be erected at Twenty-fourth and Chestnut streets will be equally as fine as the Broad Street depot. The outward appearance of the building will be striking. The architecture is Flemish. The lower wall will principally be of iron, carried on iron columns and boxes, and the upper walls will be of brick, red-stone and terra cotta. The string courses, cornices and brackets will be of terra cotta, and the roof will be covered with red tile. The appearance of the building in profile will be most picturesque.

The Philadelphia station was essentially built on stilts, with its main entrance from the Chestnut Street Bridge, 30 feet above grade level. The B&O tracks ran along the east bank of the Schuylkill River and under the bridge. Furness mixed Flemish Revival detailing with an industrial aesthetic of brick, iron and glass. Through the station's innovative plan, he separated the flow of passengers waiting to board the trains from those arriving. Directly south of the passenger station stretched a brick baggage and freight building.

The station building was expanded in 1912, and its interior was remodeled in 1943. The Chestnut Street entrance porch was replaced in the 1940s.

Furness's architectural drawings are at the Historical Society of Pennsylvania.

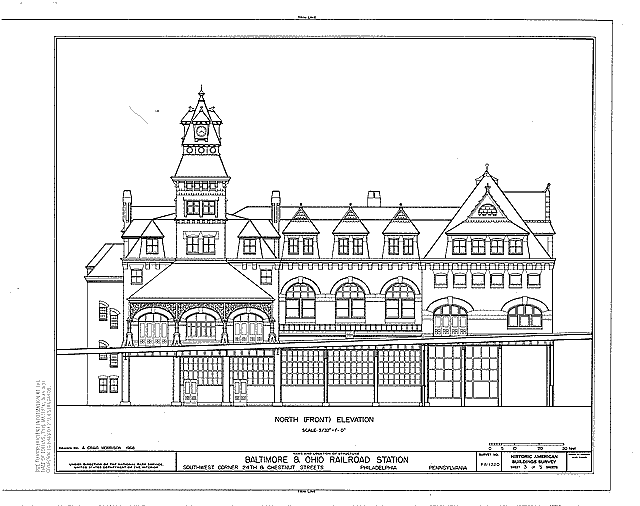
North elevation.

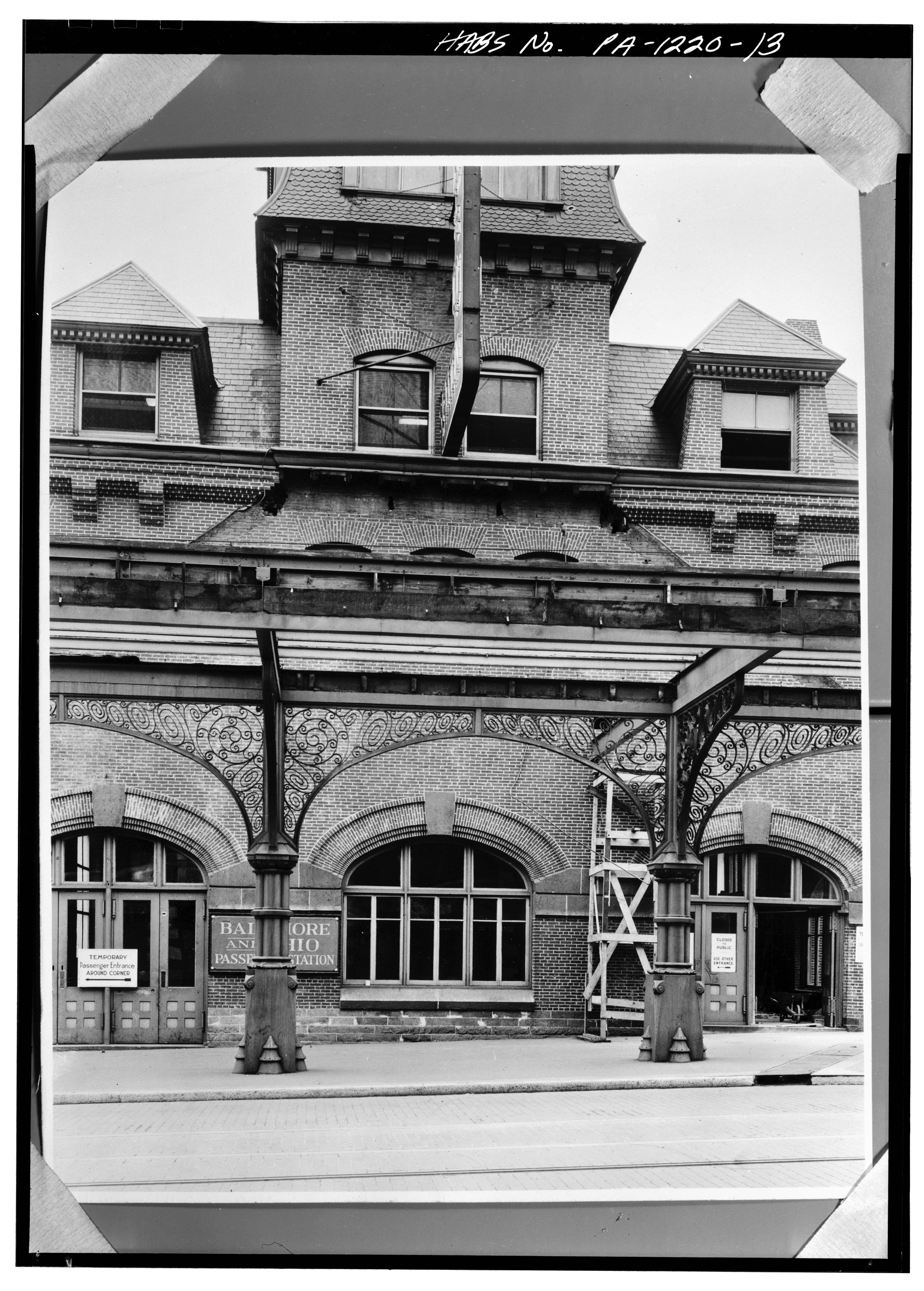
Chestnut Street porch under demolition, circa-1940.

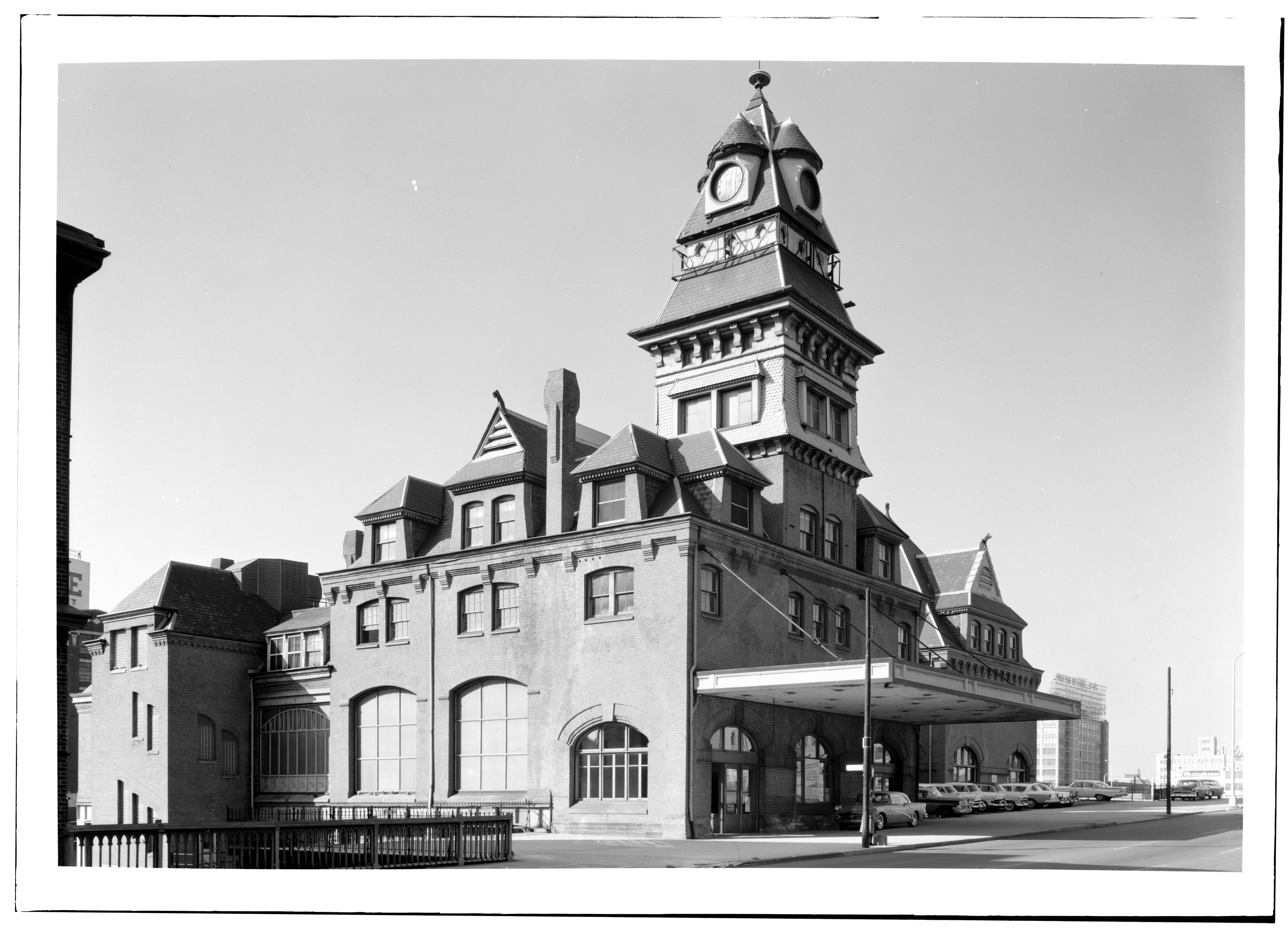
From the Chestnut Street Bridge, 1959.

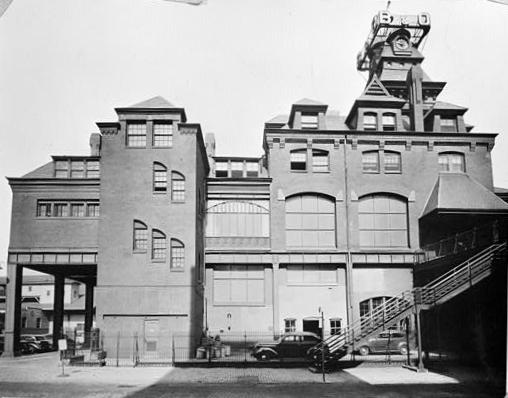
East facade from 24th Street, 1959.

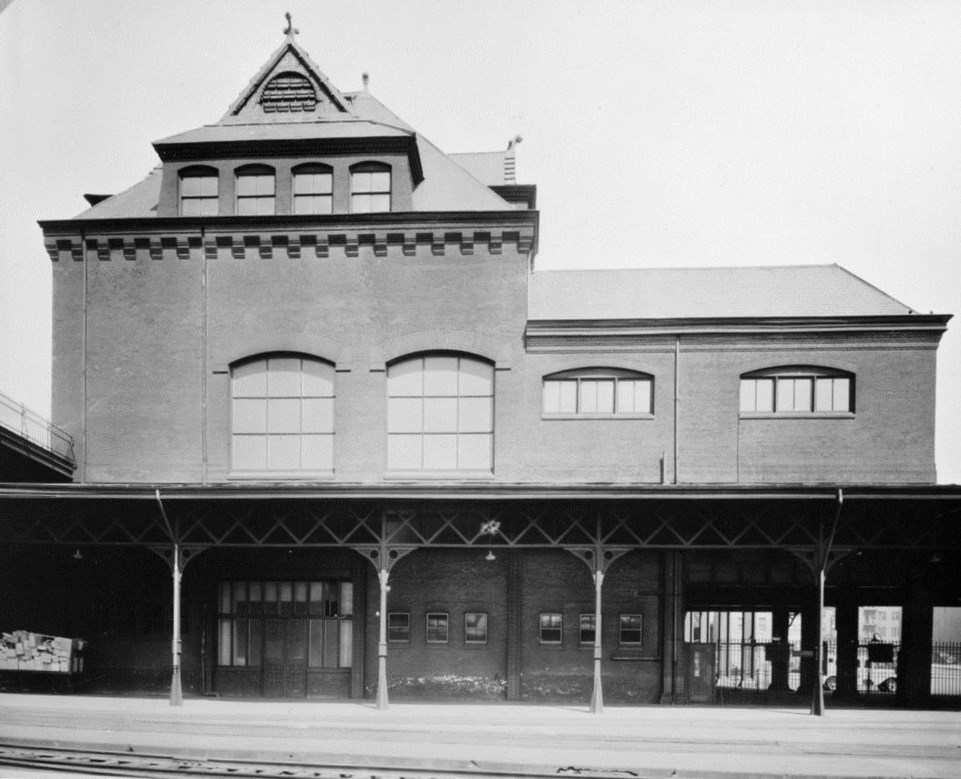
West façade and train platform, 1959.

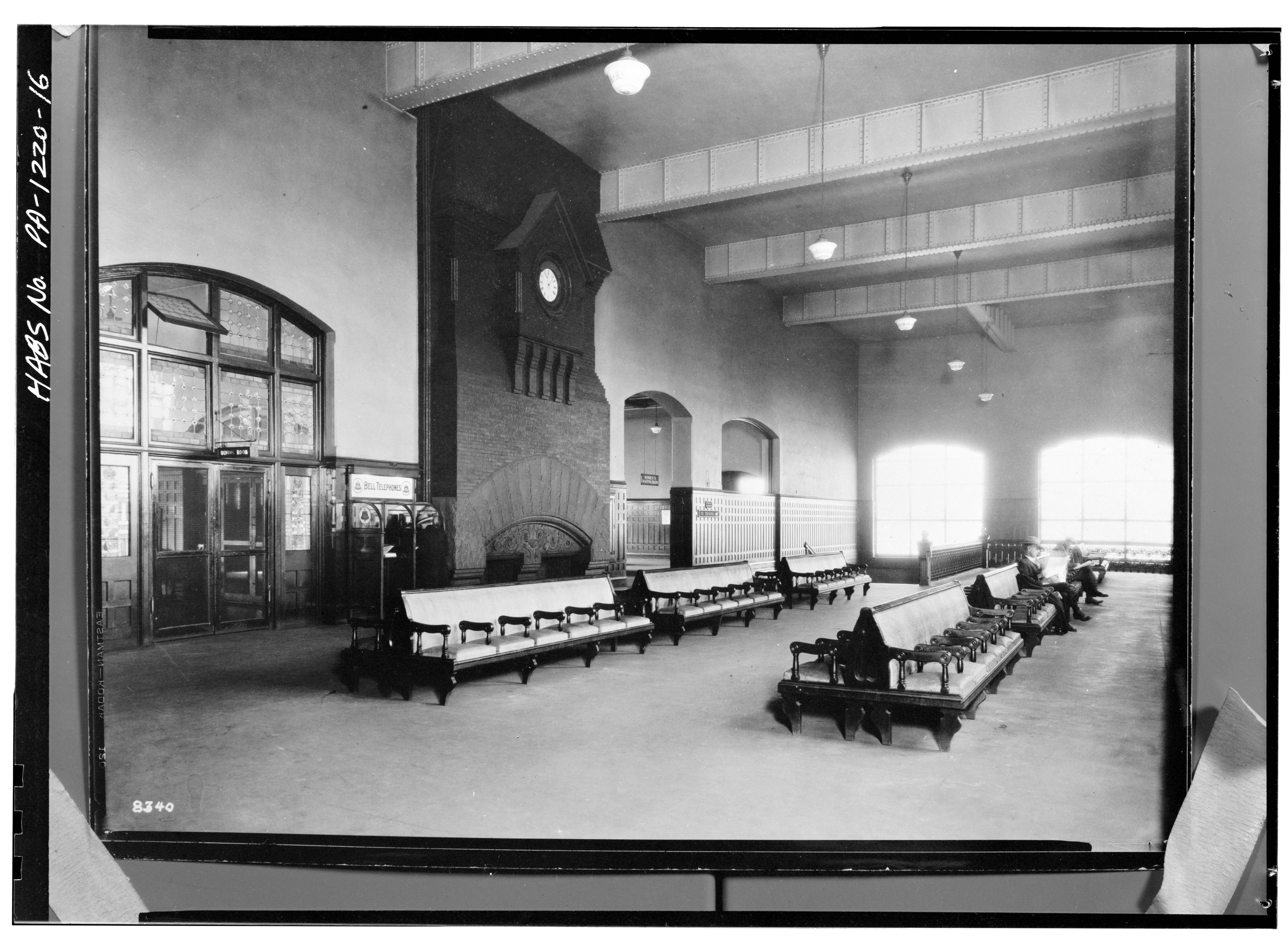
Main Waiting Room.

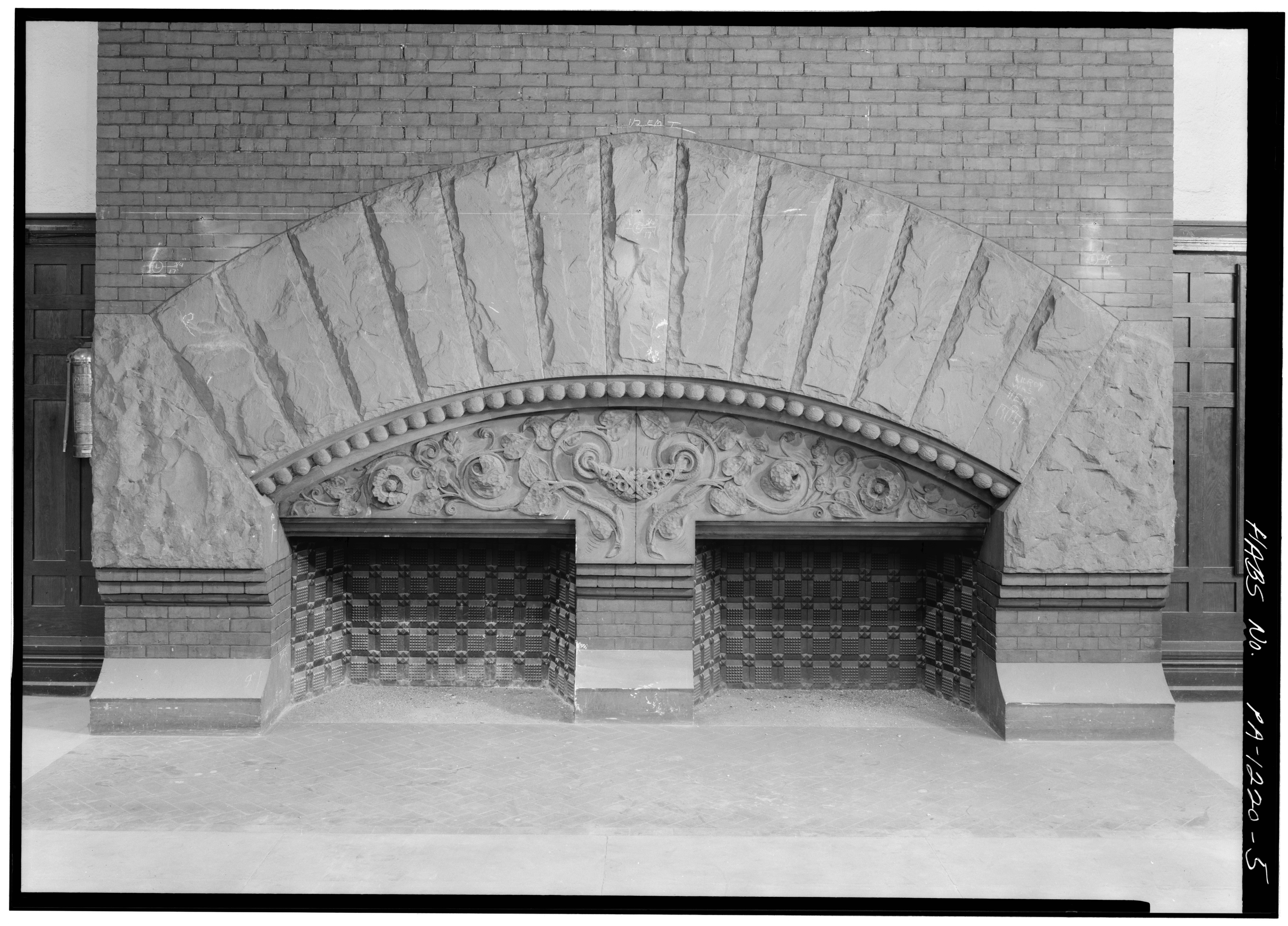
Fireplace, Main Waiting Room.

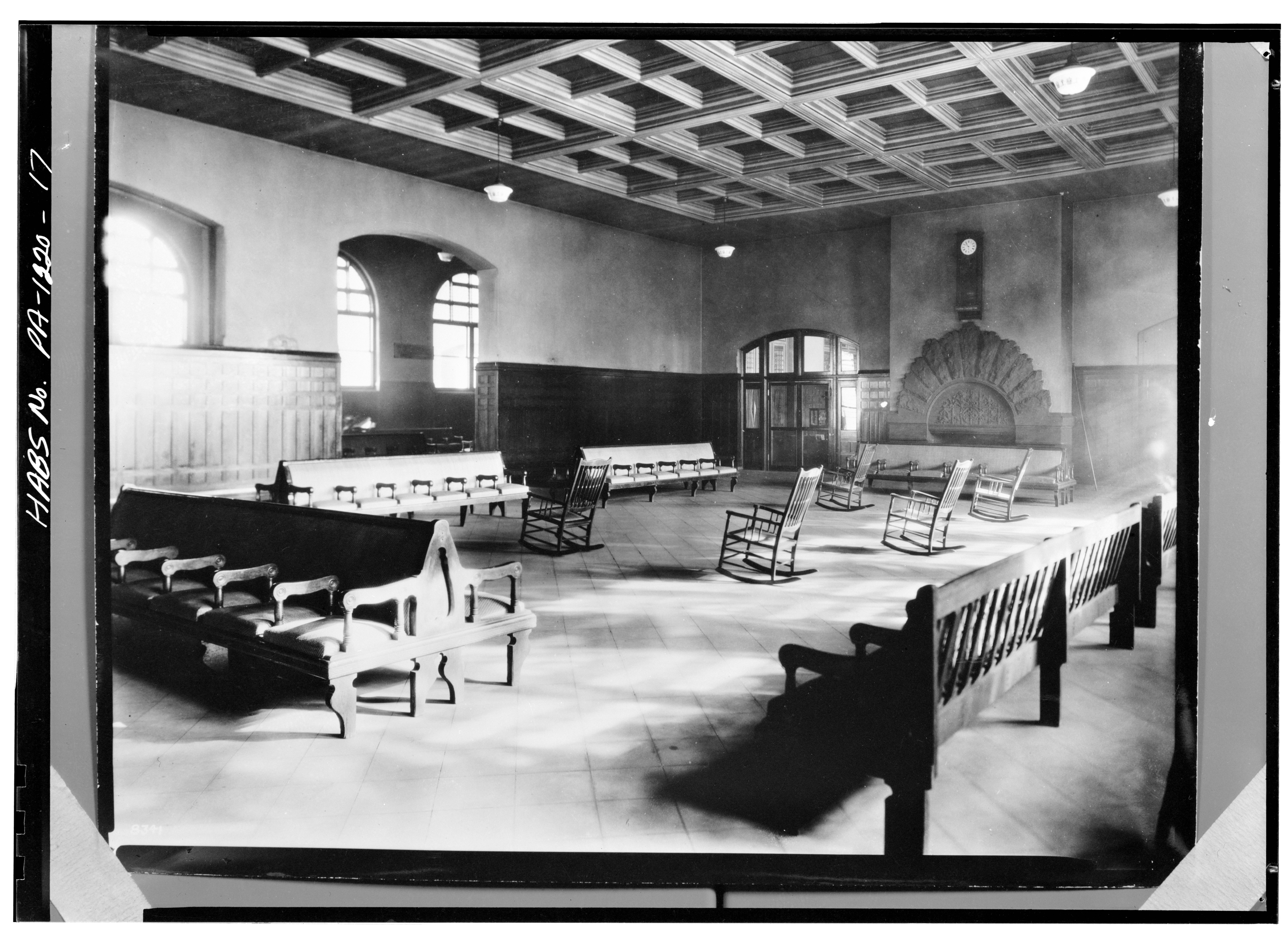
Women's Waiting Room.

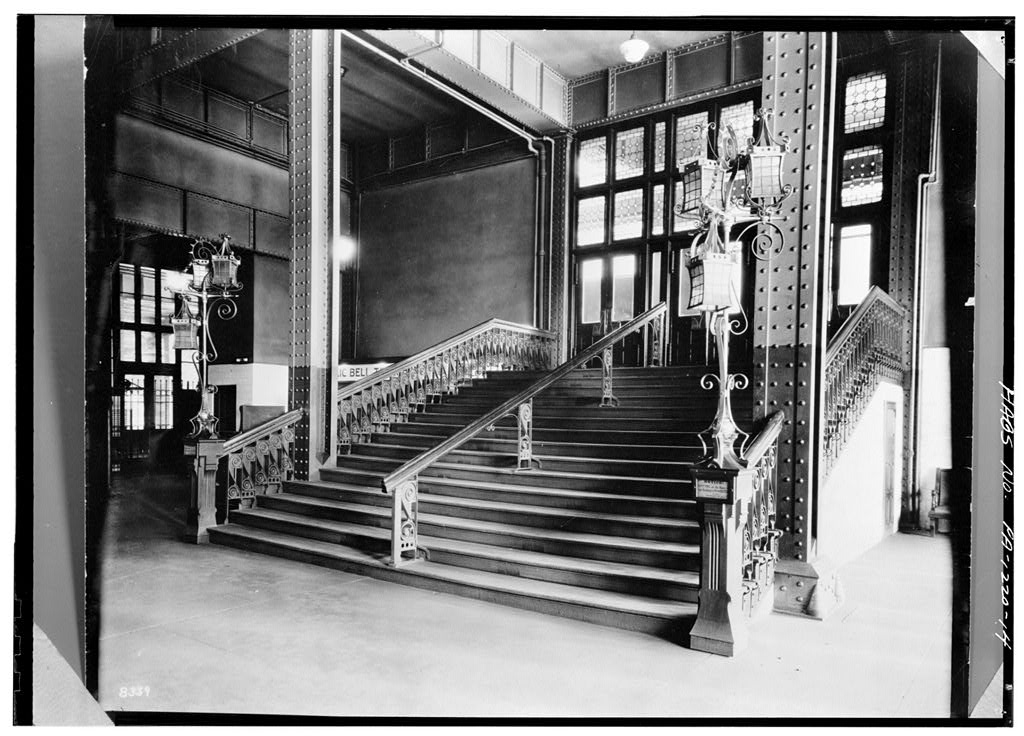
Stairs from the Lower Waiting Room.

=== Philadelphia Model Railroad Club ===
The B&O Station building was also home to the Philadelphia Model Railroad Club, which split into two separate clubs when the building was torn down. The first reopened as the Cherry Valley Model Railroad Club in Merchantville, New Jersey in 1962, and the second as the East Penn Traction Club several years later. Some of the models and buildings from the PMRC were salvaged, and live on today on the CVMRR layout.

=== Demolition ===
The Philadelphia B & O station saw its last regularly scheduled passenger train on April 28, 1958, when the Baltimore and Ohio Railroad ended all passenger service north of Baltimore. The station suffered a fire in 1963, and was demolished.

=== Mural Arts Program ===
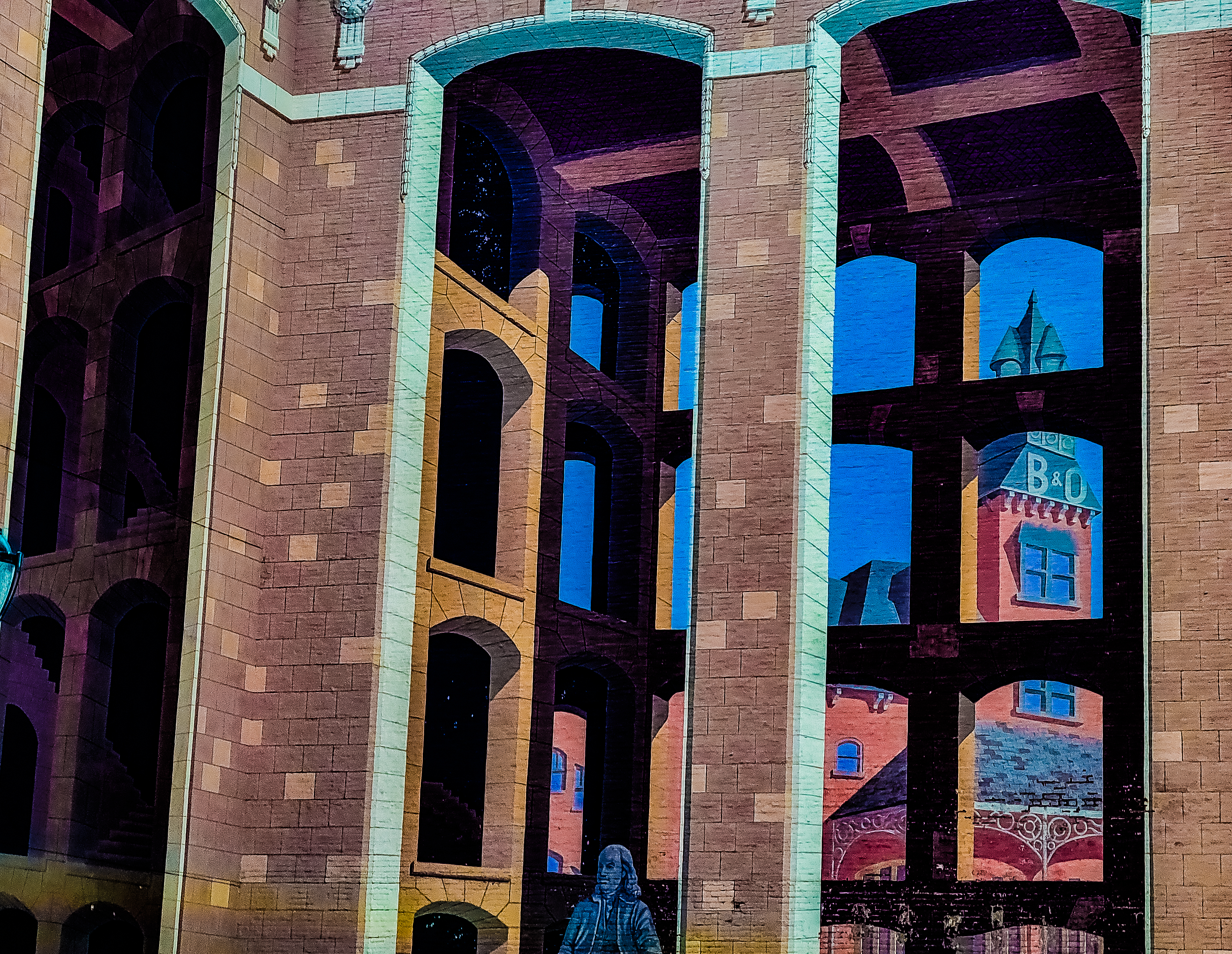
B&O mural

As part of the city's Mural Arts Program, a mural commemorating the station has been executed on the side of 2300 Chestnut Street, across from where the station stood.

== See also ==
- 30th Street Station
- Broad Street Station (Philadelphia)
- List of National Historic Landmarks in Philadelphia
- Reading Terminal
- Suburban Station
