= West Virginia Night Express =

American named train between Illinois and West Virginia, US

Overview
- Service type: Inter-city rail
- Status: Discontinued
- Locale: Mid-Atlantic United States; Midwestern United States
- First service: 1912
- Last service: December 1, 1956
- Former operator(s): Baltimore & Ohio Railroad

Route
- Termini: Chicago, Illinois; Wheeling, West Virginia

Technical
- Track gauge: 4 ft 8 1/2 in (1,435 mm)

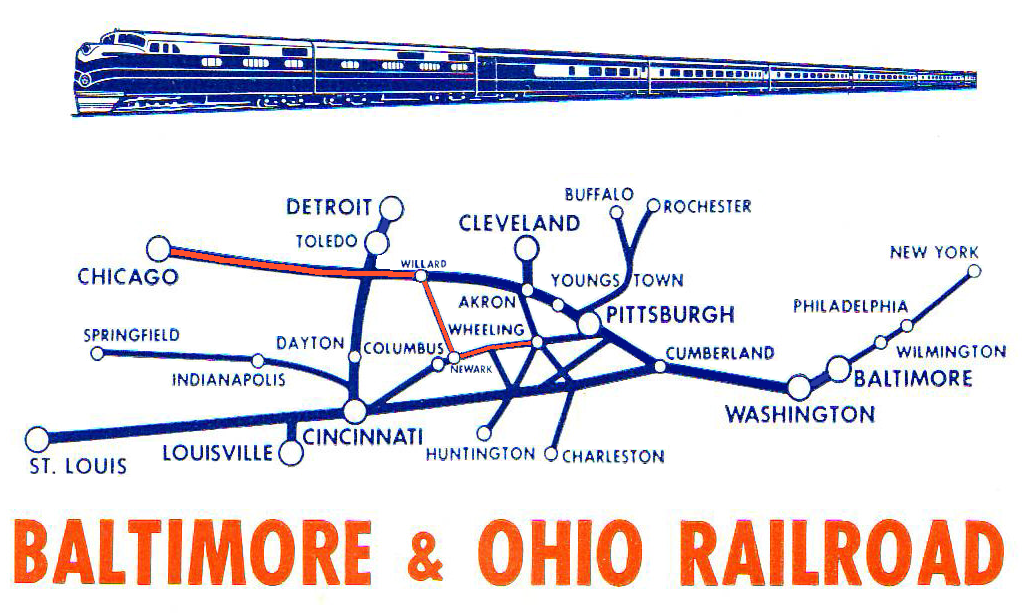
The route of the West Virginia Night Express (in orange)

The West Virginia Night Express (also sometimes called the Wheeling Night Express) was an American named train of the Baltimore and Ohio Railroad (B&O) on its route between Chicago, Illinois, and Wheeling, West Virginia, with major station stops in Willard and Newark, Ohio. The B&O inaugurated the West Virginia Night Express in 1912. It was discontinued in 1956 due to declining passenger demand.

== History ==
The Baltimore and Ohio Railroad was chartered in 1827 and grew to be one of the largest passenger railways in the United States, often by acquiring other, smaller railroads. B&O trains began operating between Chicago and Wheeling in 1880.

From 1912 until 1956 the B&O provided overnight sleeping car service between Chicago's Grand Central Station and Wheeling, West Virginia, on the Wheeling Night Express, Train No. 46. The reverse route, Train No. 45, was served by the Chicago Night Express. In 1928, the routes were consolidated with Train Nos. 15/16 from Willard, Ohio, to Chicago. During World War II, the West Virginia Night Express was consolidated with Train No. 9, the Pittsburgh-Chicago Express on the western end of the run from the junction at Willard, Ohio, to Chicago. In 1946, the West Virginia Night Express resumed independent operation from Willard to Chicago.

== Decline and end of the train ==
As railroad passenger traffic was declining nationwide, the B&O discontinued the West Virginia Night Express on December 1, 1956, which ended passenger rail service between Chicago and Wheeling.

== Stations ==
Station	State
Chicago Grand Central Terminal	Illinois
Gary (B&O station)	Indiana
Willard	Ohio
Mansfield	Ohio
Newark	Ohio
Zanesville	Ohio
Wheeling	West Virginia

== Schedule and equipment ==
In 1947, the eastbound West Virginia Night Express, Train # 46 operated on the following schedule (departure times at principal stops shown):

City	Departure time
Chicago (Grand Central Terminal)	8:45 p.m.
Gary, Ind. (B&O station)	9:47 p.m.
Willard. Ohio	3:57 a.m.
Mansfield, Ohio	5:03 a.m.
Newark, Ohio	6:52 a.m.
Zanesville, Ohio	7:48 a.m.
Wheeling, W. Va.	10:35 a.m.
source: Baltimore and Ohio System Timetable, July 6, 1947

In the 1940s, the eastbound West Virginia Night Express consisted of two or three head-ended cars, an RPO baggage car, a coach and a sleeper. Between Newark, Ohio and Wheeling there was a diner car. In 1947, the diner car was replaced with a diner-parlor car. The train was dieselized in 1956, the last year it operated.
