= Chicago Night Express =

American named train

Overview
- Service type: Inter-city rail
- Status: Discontinued
- Locale: Mid-Atlantic United States; Midwestern United States
- First service: 1912
- Last service: December 1, 1956
- Former operator(s): Baltimore & Ohio Railroad

Route
- Termini: Chicago, Illinois; Wheeling, West Virginia

Technical
- Track gauge: 4 ft 8 1/2 in (1,435 mm)

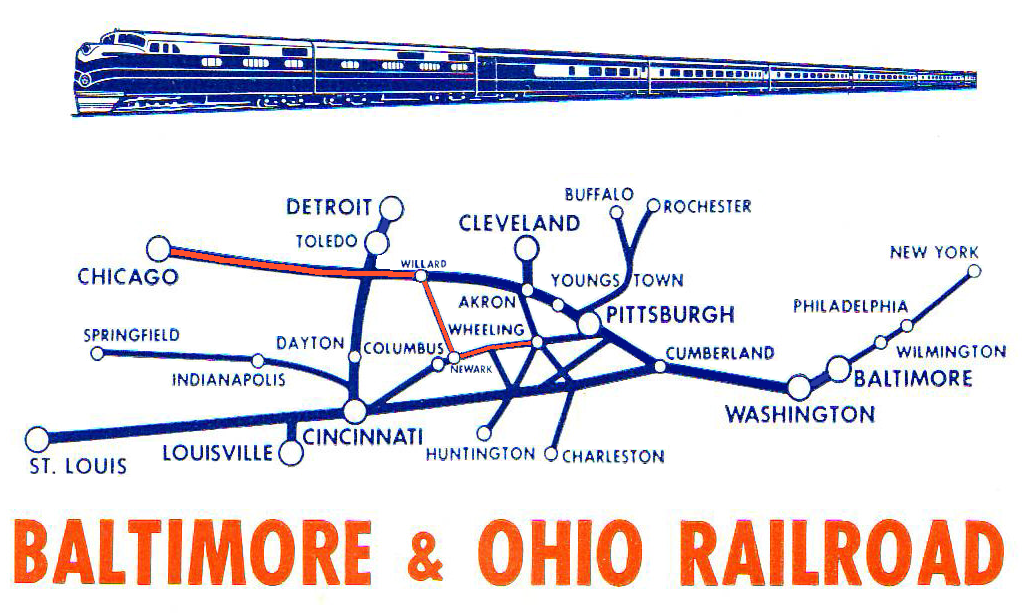
The route of the Chicago Night Express (in orange)

The Chicago Night Express was an American named train of the Baltimore and Ohio Railroad (B&O) on its route between Wheeling, West Virginia, and Chicago, Illinois, with major station stops in Newark, Ohio, Mansfield, Ohio, and Willard, Ohio. The B&O inaugurated the Chicago Night Express in 1912. It was discontinued in 1956 due to declining passenger demand.

== History ==
The Baltimore and Ohio Railroad was chartered in 1827 and grew to be one of the largest passenger railways in the United States, often by acquiring other, smaller railroads. B&O trains began operating between Wheeling and Chicago in 1880.

From 1912 until 1956 the B&O provided overnight sleeping car service between Wheeling, West Virginia and Chicago's Grand Central Station on the Chicago Night Express, Train No. 45. The train also stopped at the B&O's South Chicago Station. The reverse route, Train No. 46, was served by the Wheeling Night Express or the West Virginia Night Express, as it was later known. During World War II, the Chicago Night Express was consolidated with Train No. 9, the Pittsburgh-Chicago Express on the western end of the run from the junction at Willard, Ohio, to Chicago. In 1946, the Chicago Night Express resumed independent operation from Willard to Chicago.

== Decline and end of the train ==
By 1956, as railroad passenger traffic was declining nationwide, the Chicago Night Express operated as Train No. 245 from Wheeling only as far west as Willard, via Newark, Ohio. West of Willard, the sleeping car and coaches from train 245 were combined with Train No. 9, the Washington-Pittsburgh-Chicago Express, to Chicago. B&O finally discontinued the Chicago Night Express on December 1, 1956, which ended passenger rail service between Wheeling and Chicago.

== Stations ==
Station	State
Wheeling (Wheeling station)	West Virginia
Zanesville	Ohio
Newark	Ohio
Mansfield	Ohio
Willard	Ohio
Gary (B&O station)	Indiana
Chicago (Grand Central Terminal)	Illinois

== Route and schedule ==
In 1947, westbound Chicago Night Express, Train # 9 operated on the following schedule (departure times at principal stops shown):

City	Departure time
Wheeling, W. Va. (Wheeling station)	7:00 p.m.
Zanesville, Ohio	9:48 p.m.
Newark, Ohio	10:35 p.m.
Mansfield, Ohio	12:18 a.m.
Willard. Ohio	1:30 a.m.
Gary, Ind. (B&O station)	5:04 a.m.
Chicago (Grand Central Terminal)	6:15 a.m.
source: Baltimore and Ohio System Timetable, July 6, 1947

In the 1940s, the westbound Chicago Night Express consisted of two or three head-ended cars, an RPO baggage car, a coach and a sleeper. Between Wheeling and Newark, Ohio there was a diner car. In 1947, the diner car was replaced with a diner-parlor car. The train was dieselized in 1956, the last year it operated. By then, the train had a single 8 section-4 double bedroom sleeping car, a diner-lounge, a combine car and coaches.
