= Daylight Speedliner =

American passenger train

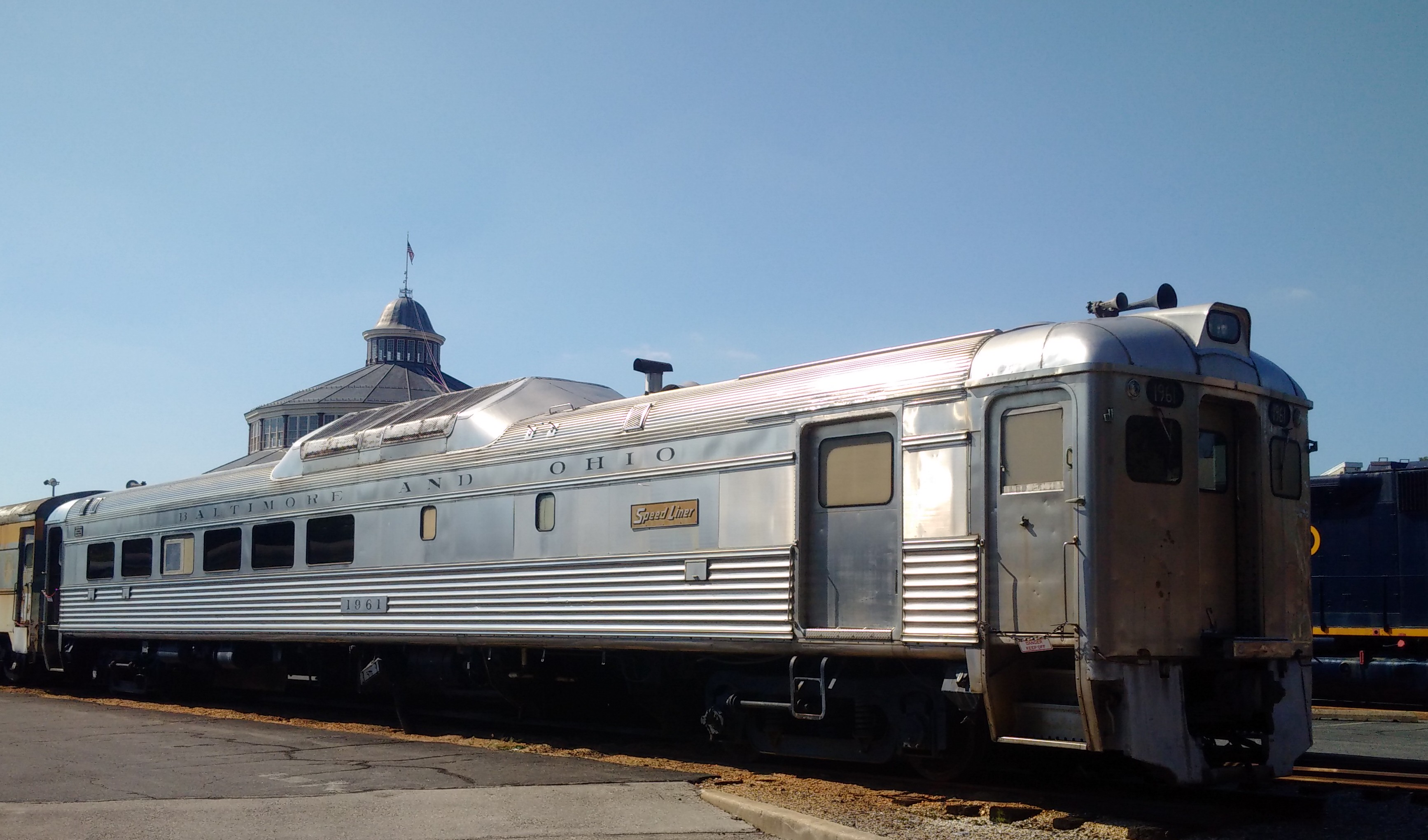
- One of the Daylight Speedliner baggage-dining-coach combines

Overview
- Service type: Inter-city rail
- Status: Discontinued
- Locale: Mid-Atlantic United States
- Predecessor: Washingtonian
- First service: October 28, 1956
- Last service: January 21, 1963
- Former operator(s): Baltimore & Ohio Railroad

Route
- Termini: Philadelphia; Pittsburgh

Technical
- Track gauge: 4 ft 8 1/2 in (1,435 mm)

The Daylight Speedliner was an American named passenger train of the Baltimore and Ohio Railroad (B&O) in the 1950s and early 1960s. Equipped with three or four streamlined, self-propelled Budd Rail Diesel Cars (RDCs) coupled together, it initially operated between Philadelphia, Pennsylvania and Pittsburgh, Pennsylvania, via Baltimore, Maryland, and Washington, D. C., as Trains #21–22.

The B&O had been using RDCs in local Baltimore–Washington, D.C., commuter service since 1950. Pleased with their reliability and lower operating costs compared to heavyweight passenger trains drawn by steam locomotives, the B&O decided in 1955 to replace its money-losing Washingtonian steam train with RDCs, ordering four RDC-1s with reclining coach seats and two RDC-2s with baggage compartments. The RDC-equipped Daylight Speedliner entered service on October 28, 1956, and reduced the railroad's operating expenses by almost half, compared to the Washingtonian train it replaced.

After B&O discontinued passenger service north of Baltimore on April 26, 1958, the Daylight Speedliner operated between Baltimore and Pittsburgh, covering the 333-mile (536 km) route on a seven-hour schedule, until its discontinuation on January 21, 1963.

== Stations ==
Station	State
Baltimore (Camden Station)	Maryland
Washington (Union Station)	District of Columbia
Silver Spring	Maryland
Harpers Ferry	West Virginia
Martinsburg	West Virginia
Cumberland	Maryland
Connellsville	Pennsylvania
McKeesport	Pennsylvania
Pittsburgh (P&LE Station)	Pennsylvania

== Schedule and equipment ==
In 1961, the westbound Daylight Speedliner, operating as B&O's Train # 21, departed Baltimore at 9:00 a.m. and then Washington, D.C., at 10:00 a.m., arriving in Pittsburgh at 4:20 p.m. on the following schedule (principal stops shown in blue):

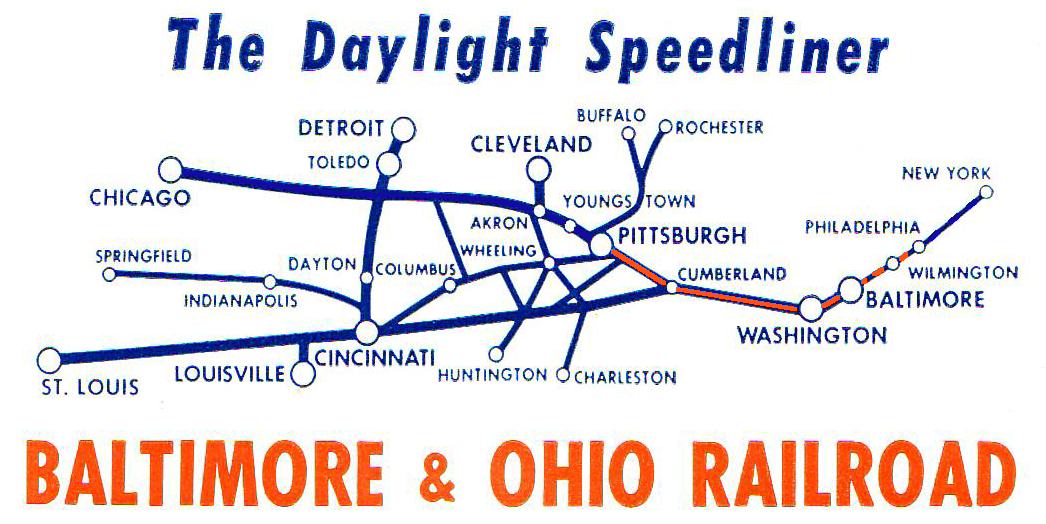
Route of the Daylight Speedliner (in orange)

City	Departure time
Baltimore, Md. (Camden Station)	9:00 a.m.
Washington, D.C. (Union Station)	10:00 a.m.
Silver Spring, Md.	10:11 a.m.
Harpers Ferry, W. Va.	11:02 a.m.
Martinsburg, W. Va.	11:25 a.m.
Cumberland, Md.	12:55 p.m.
Connellsville, Pa.	3:00 p.m.
McKeesport, Pa.	3:55 p.m.
Pittsburgh, Pa. (P&LE Station)	4:20 p.m.
source: Baltimore and Ohio Railroad System Time Tables, April 30, 1961

Unusual for RDCs, the lead RDC-2 car was configured by B&O as a combination dining car/baggage car/coach (pictured) offering full meal service, with the addition of a kitchen and six tables, listed in B&O's 1961 time table as a "refreshment diner". Two of these unique cars were built for the service; both survive today. One is on display at the B&O Railroad Museum in Baltimore, Md; the other is at the Danbury Railway Museum in Danbury, Conn.
