= Sandy Hook, Maryland =

Unincorporated community in Maryland, United States

- Unincorporated community
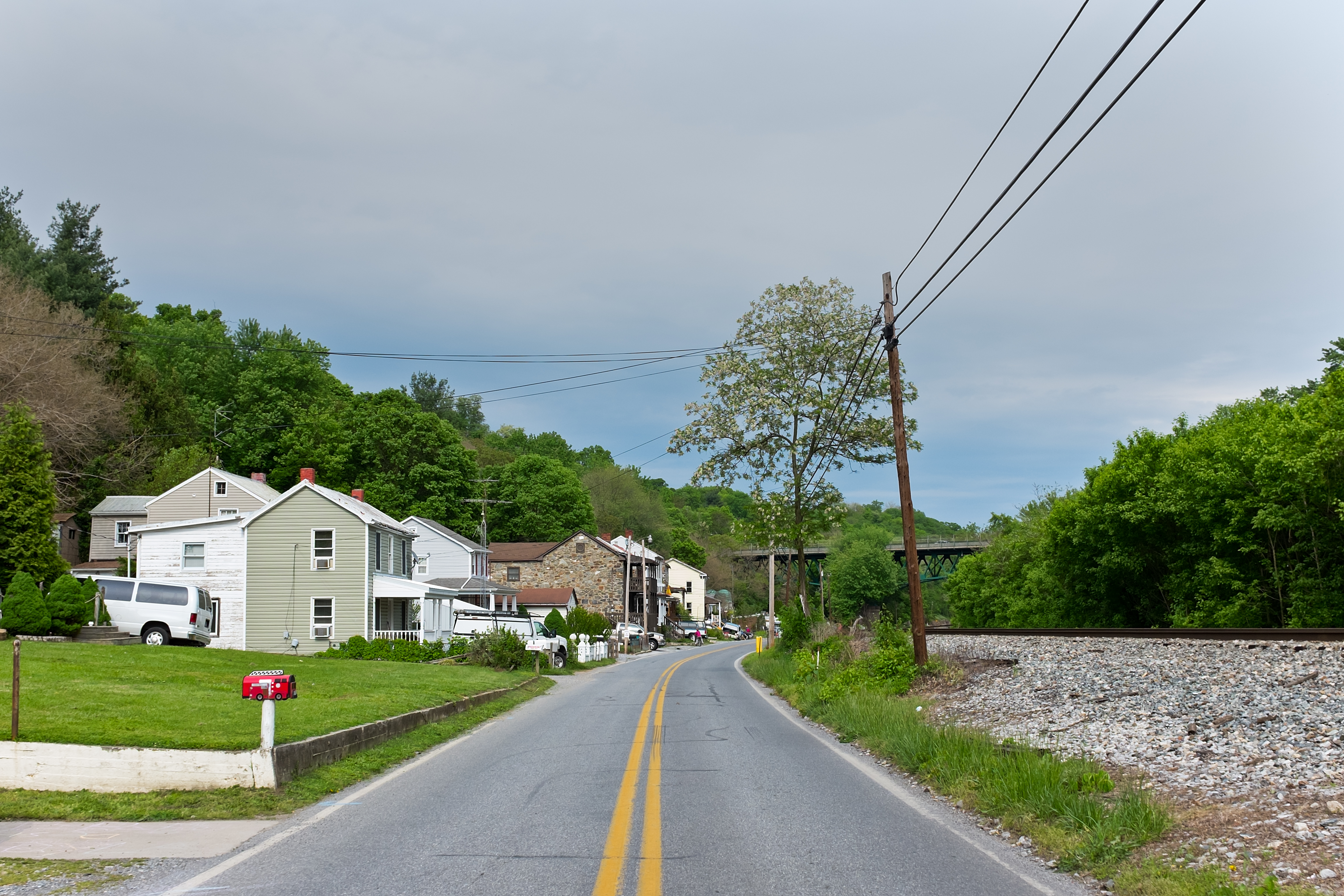

- Location within Maryland Location within the United States
- Coordinates: 39°19′43″N 77°42′19″W
- Country: United States
- State: Maryland
- County: Washington

Area
  - Total: 0.22 sq mi (0.56 km^{2})
  - Land: 0.22 sq mi (0.56 km^{2})
  - Water: 0 sq mi (0.00 km^{2})
- Elevation: 404 ft (123 m)

Population (2020)
  - Total: 168
  - Density: 779.0/sq mi (300.79/km^{2})
- Time zone: UTC−5 (Eastern (EST))
  - Summer (DST): UTC−4 (EDT)
- ZIP code: 21758
- Area codes: 301, 240
- GNIS feature ID: 2583684

Sandy Hook is an unincorporated community and census-designated place in Washington County, Maryland, United States. Its population was 188 as of the 2010 census.

== History ==
Sandy Hook was briefly important as, for a few years, it was the end of the line for the Baltimore and Ohio Railroad, then under construction. This period ended with the B & O Railroad Potomac River Crossing opening in 1837.

During John Brown's 1859 raid on Harpers Ferry, just 3 miles (4.8 km) to the west, across the bridge, a special train that had carried soldiers was parked at Sandy Hook. It carried the telegraph that reporters used to send out voluminous stories. Baltimore and Ohio Railroad night watchman Patrick Higgins (1832- 1915) lived in Sandy Hook from 1853 until 1915. At his death, he was the longest-tenured Baltimore and Ohio Railroad employee. Patrick has been written about extensively for his role in John Brown's Raid of 1859.

== Geography ==
According to the U.S. Census Bureau, the community has an area of 0.216 square miles (0.56 km^{2}), all land.

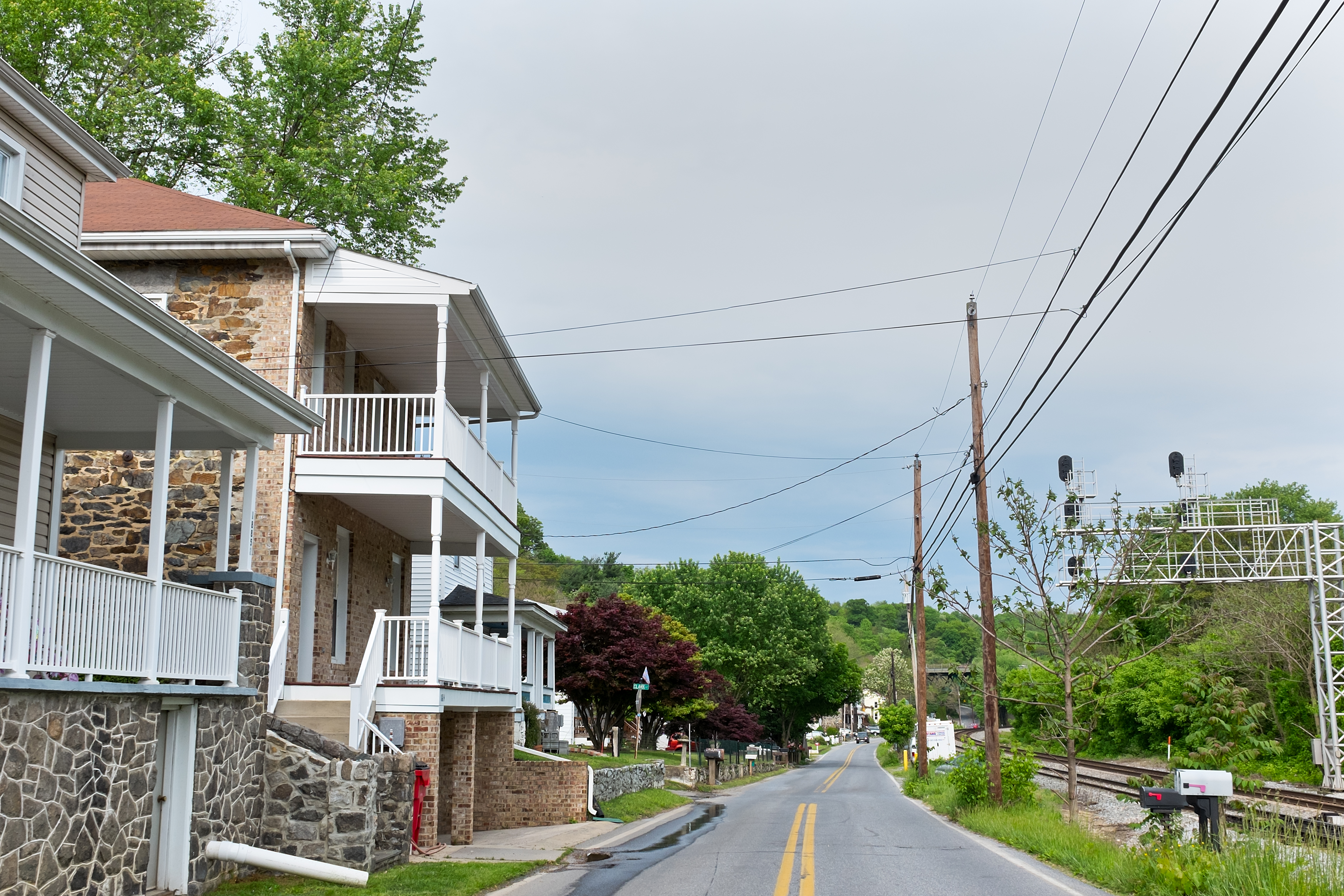
Sandy Hook, Maryland

== Demographics ==
Historical population
Census	Pop.	Note	%±
2020	168		—
U.S. Decennial Census
