= Washingtonian (B&O train) =

- A 4-6-2 President-class Pacific steam locomotive pulls westbound B&O Train # 21, the Washingtonian, along the Potomac River near Hansrote, West Virginia, on October 30, 1952.

Overview
- Service type: Inter-city rail
- Status: Discontinued
- Locale: Mid-Atlantic United States; Midwestern United States
- First service: 1914
- Last service: 1956
- Former operator(s): Baltimore & Ohio Railroad

Route
- Termini: Baltimore, Maryland early decades: Philadelphia, Pennsylvania; Cleveland, Ohio early decades: Washington, D.C.
- Service frequency: Daily
- Train number(s): 21 (westbound); 22 (eastbound)

On-board services
- Seating arrangements: Reclining Seat Coaches (1955)
- Catering facilities: Parlor Dining Car

Technical
- Track gauge: 4 ft 8 1/2 in (1,435 mm)

The Washingtonian was one of two daily American named passenger trains operated by the Baltimore and Ohio Railroad (B&O) during the 1940s–1950s between Baltimore, Maryland and Cleveland, Ohio, via Washington, D.C., and Pittsburgh, Pennsylvania. It was the last B&O long-haul passenger train to be powered by a steam locomotive from the venerable railroad's namesake city.

In earlier decades the train ran from the B&O's Chestnut Street station in Philadelphia to Washington, DC's Union Station.

Inaugurated on April 27, 1941, the Washingtonian was primarily a daytime train with a morning departure, in contrast to B&O's other train on the route, the Cleveland Night Express. Between Pittsburgh and Cleveland, the Washingtonian's cars left B&O rails and were coupled to the Steel King train of the Pittsburgh and Lake Erie Railroad (P&LE) to Youngstown, Ohio, where the Erie Railroad handled the train to Union Terminal in Cleveland.

The Washingtonian was regularly operated with steam locomotives on B&O's Baltimore–Washington, D. C.–Cumberland, Maryland mainline until November 3, 1953, when it was finally assigned diesel locomotives. The diesel-powered, conventionally-equipped Washingtonian was replaced on October 27, 1956, by the faster and more economical Budd Rail Diesel Car (RDC) Daylight Speedliner between Philadelphia, Baltimore, Washington, and Pittsburgh, reducing operating expenses by half. The streamlined Daylight Speedliner's seven-hour schedule on B&O's 333-mile (536 km) Baltimore–Pittsburgh route also trimmed almost two hours travel time compared to the Washingtonian.

== Schedule and equipment ==
The westbound Washingtonian, operating as Train No. 21, left Baltimore at 9:00 a.m., arriving in Cleveland twelve hours later at 9:00 p.m. Eastbound, the Washingtonian was designated Train No. 22. The train's consist was typically a pair of baggage/express cars, a Railway Post Office car, three air conditioned coaches, and a combination parlor-diner-lounge car. In the late 1940s, as many as six additional coaches were added on weekends to accommodate the throngs of East Coast-bound passengers boarding the train at the numerous Appalachian Mountain communities along the B&O's right-of-way.

In its final year of service, westbound Washingtonian Train No. 21 operated on the following schedule (principal stops shown in blue, P&LE–Erie Steel King denoted in yellow):

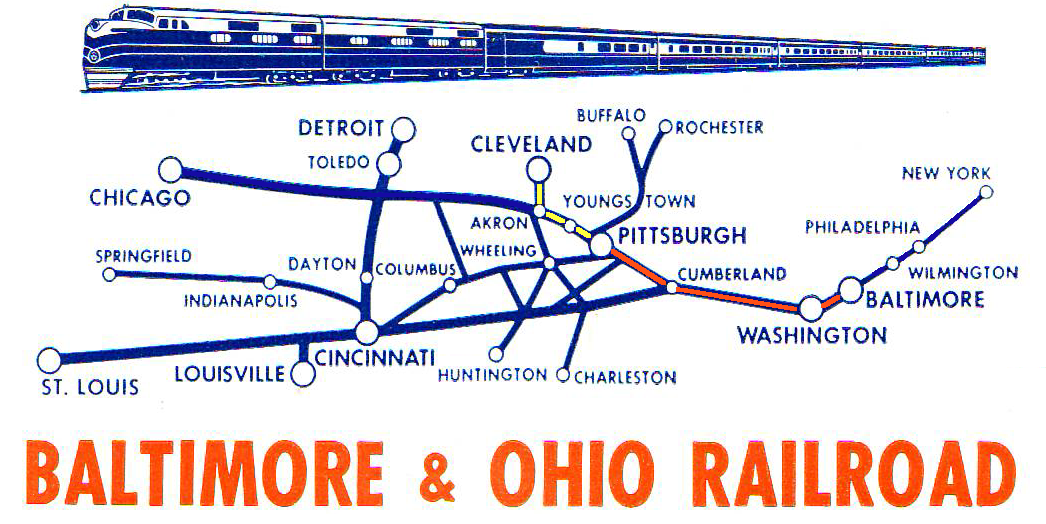
Route of the B&O Washingtonian, in orange (P&LE and Erie Railroad Steel King in yellow)

City	Departure time
Baltimore, Md. (Mount Royal)	9:00 a.m.
Washington, D.C. (Union Station)	10:05 a.m.
Martinsburg, W. Va.	11:36 a.m.
Cumberland, Md.	1:15 p.m.
Connellsville, Pa.	4:11 p.m.
McKeesport, Pa.	5:12 p.m.
Pittsburgh, Pa. (P&LE Station)	6:05 p.m.
Youngstown, Ohio (B&O Station)	7:35 p.m.
Cleveland, Ohio (Union Terminal)	9:00 p.m.
source: Official Guide of the Railways, February, 1956
