= Raid on Catoctin Station =

Battle of the American Civil War

Coordinates: 39.3077°N 77.5588°W

The raid on Catoctin Station was executed against a train passing through the Catoctin Station on the Baltimore and Ohio Railroad on June 17, 1863 by Confederate cavalry forces, during the movement north into Maryland by Gen. Robert E. Lee early in the Gettysburg campaign. Union Army forces further west, in the city of Winchester, Virginia, had just been routed by Lt.Gen. Ewell's Second Corps on June 15 during the Second Battle of Winchester and federal troops were evacuating east to Harpers Ferry, West Virginia in a state of disarray. Rumors of an invasion by Lee created panic in the region, and no more trains departed Baltimore except for the mail train to Harpers Ferry that provided supplies to the Union forces in Frederick County, Maryland.

== Raid execution ==
During the predawn hours on June 17, Confederate cavalry forces forded the Potomac River, split into two groups and attacked both the Union cavalry near Catoctin station, and the military supply train, which was the last of five separate supply trains heading east from Catoctin Station. The train engineer managed to fend off the attack by getting the train moved away down the line, but he, the conductor and fifteen passengers along with the train were all successfully captured at the next Point of Rocks Station. The train was carrying a load of flour from western mill companies, and the entire cargo was burned.
