= Wheeling station (West Virginia) =

- Wheeling Baltimore and Ohio Railroad Passenger Station
- U.S. National Register of Historic Places
- U.S. Historic district – Contributing property
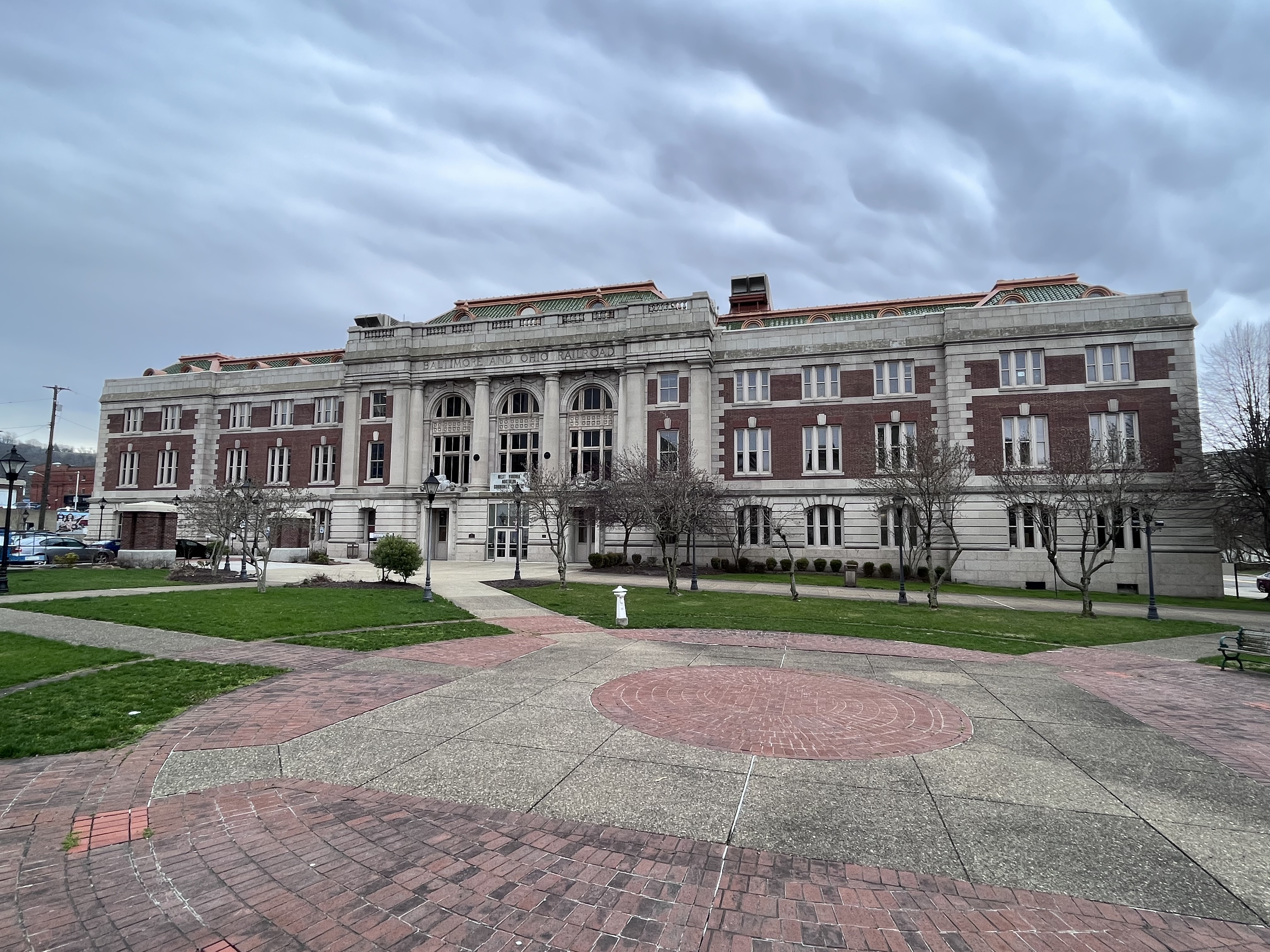
- West Virginia Northern Community College

- Location within West Virginia Location within the United States
- Location: Wheeling, West Virginia
- Coordinates: 40°3′48″N 80°43′18″W
- Built: 1908
- Architect: M.A. Long
- Architectural style: Beaux Arts
- NRHP reference No.: 79002596
- Added to NRHP: March 26, 1979

Wheeling station is a U.S. historic train station located at Wheeling, Ohio County, West Virginia. It was built in 1907–1908, and is a four-story, rectangular brick and limestone building in the Beaux-Arts-style. It measures 250 feet long by 89 feet, 6 inches, deep. It features mansard roofs, built of concrete and covered with Spanish tile painted pink. Passenger service ceased in 1961. The building was remodeled in 1976 to house the West Virginia Northern Community College.

It was listed on the National Register of Historic Places in 1996 as the Wheeling Baltimore and Ohio Railroad Passenger Station.

== Gallery ==
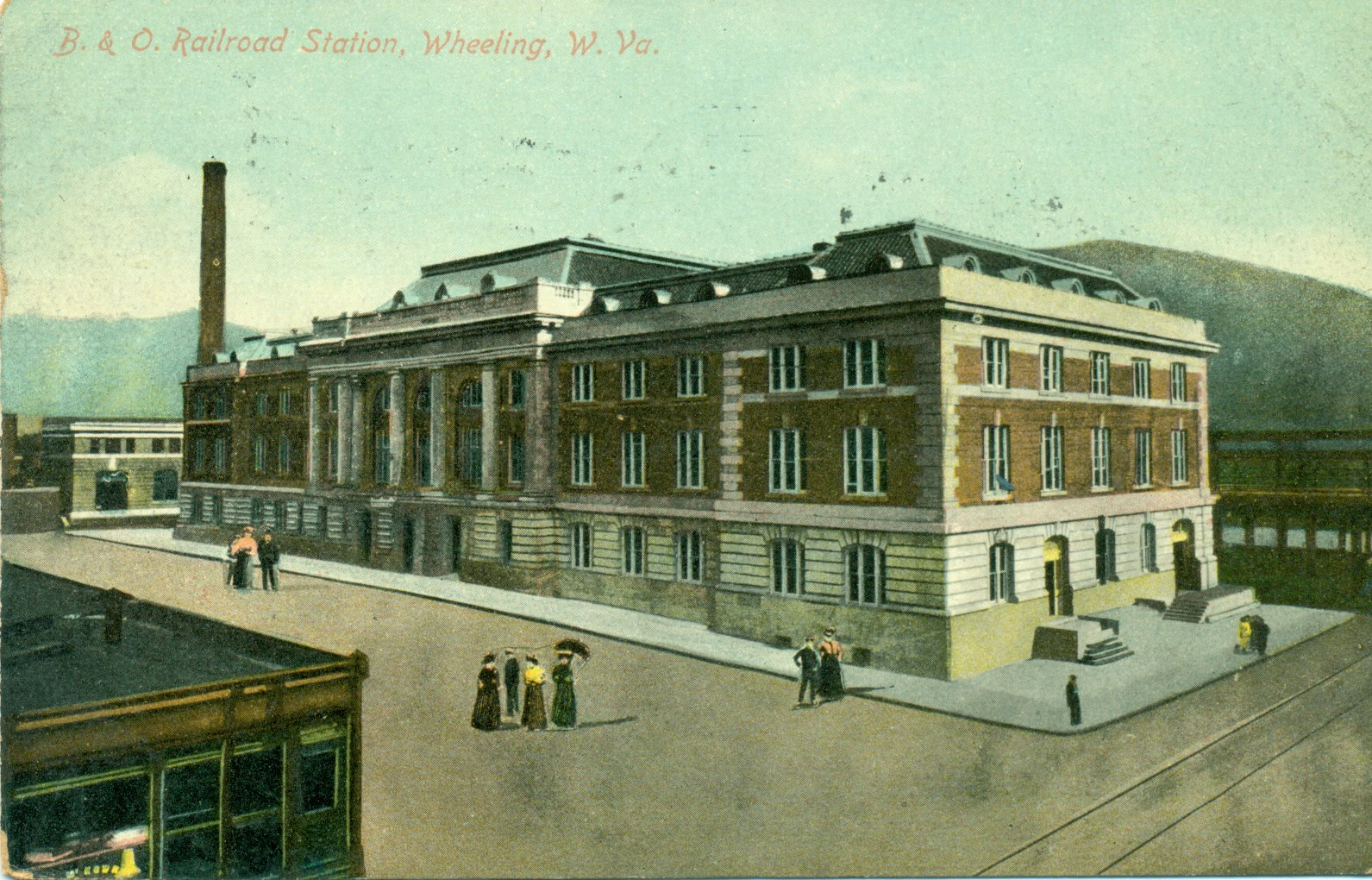
B & O Passenger Station at Wheeling (ca. 1913)

== See also ==
- List of historic sites in Ohio County, West Virginia
- List of Registered Historic Places in West Virginia

Preceding station	Baltimore and Ohio Railroad	Following station
Benwood Junction toward Cincinnati	Cincinnati – Pittsburgh	Elm Grove toward Pittsburgh
Benwood Junction toward Cleveland	Cleveland – Akron – Wheeling	Terminus
Benwood Junction toward Kenova	Kenova – Wheeling	Terminus
Terminus	Wheeling – Grafton	Benwood Junction toward Grafton
