= Baltimore and Ohio Railroad =

Rail system in the United States

- All rail lines operated by the B&O and subsidiaries
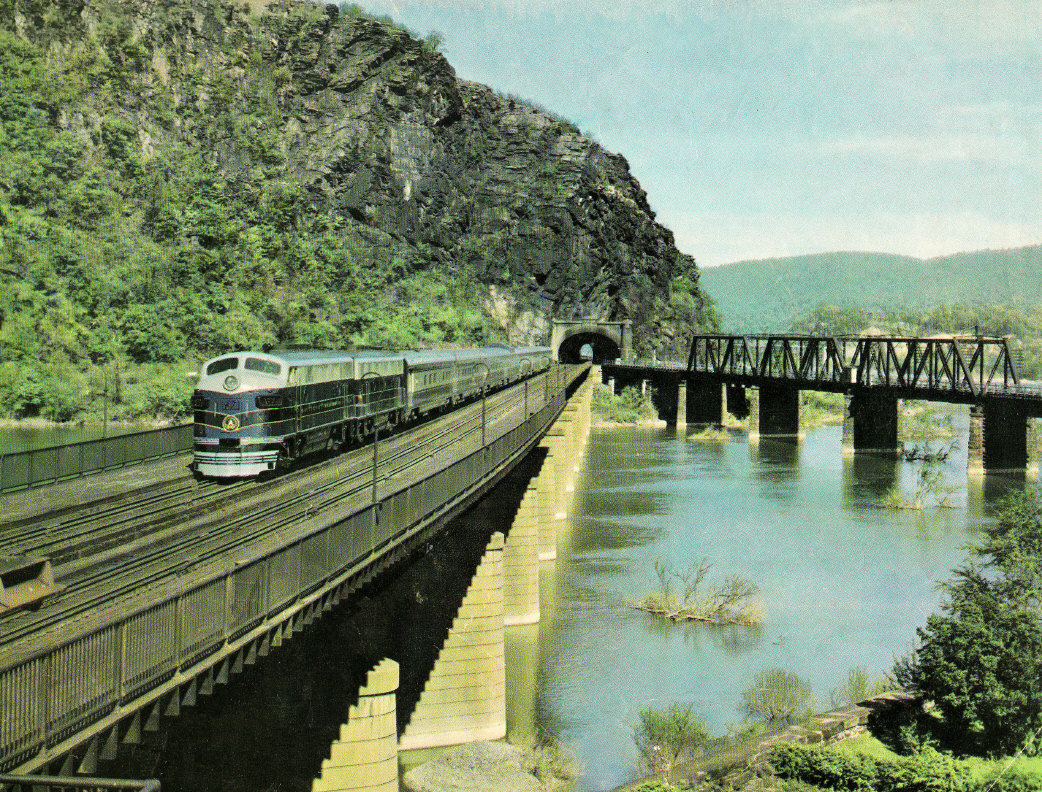
- Baltimore and Ohio Railroad's Columbian crosses the Potomac River from Maryland to Harpers Ferry, West Virginia, in 1949

Overview
- Headquarters: B&O Railroad Headquarters Building, 2 North Charles Street, Baltimore, Maryland 1906–1987
- Reporting mark: BO
- Locale: Delaware; Illinois; Indiana; Ohio; Maryland; Massachusetts; Missouri; New Jersey; New York; Pennsylvania; Virginia; Washington, D.C.; West Virginia
- Dates of operation: 1830–1987
- Successor: Chessie System/Chesapeake & Ohio Railway/CSX Transportation

Technical
- Track gauge: 4 ft 8 1/2 in (1,435 mm)
- Length: 5,552 mi (8,935 km)

The Baltimore and Ohio Railroad (reporting marks BO, B&O) was one of the oldest railroads in the United States and the first steam-operated common carrier. Maryland chartered the railroad in 1827 and construction began in 1828. It operated as B&O from 1830 until 1987, when it was merged into the Chessie System. Its lines are today controlled by CSX Transportation (CSX).

Founded to serve merchants from Baltimore who wanted to do business with settlers crossing the Appalachian Mountains, the railroad competed with several existing and proposed turnpikes and canals, including the Erie Canal and the Chesapeake and Ohio Canal, and eventually with other rail networks such as the Pennsylvania Railroad. The railroad began operation in 1830 on a 13-mile line between Baltimore and Ellicott's Mill in Maryland. Horse-drawn cars were replaced by steam locomotives the following year.

Over the following decades, construction continued westward. During the American Civil War, the railroad sustained much damage but proved crucial to the Union victory. After the war, the B&O consolidated several feeder lines in Virginia and West Virginia, and expanded westward into Ohio, Indiana, and Illinois.

In 1962, the Chesapeake and Ohio Railroad gained control of the B&O, though they continued to operate separately. By 1970, the B&O operated 4,535 miles (7,300 km) of mainline track, plus the Staten Island Rapid Transit system and the Reading Railroad and its subsidiaries. The B&O ended long-distance passenger service in 1971, although it continued limited commuter service at Washington, D.C., and Pittsburgh. In 1987, the B&O was formally merged into the C&O, which was by then a subsidiary of CSX.

The B&O is noted as a pioneer in railroading. It was the first U.S. railroad to operate a steam locomotive (the Tom Thumb); it built historic infrastructure; and it operated prestigious passenger trains. It also gained fame as one of the four railroads in the original version of the board game Monopoly.

== History ==
=== Ohio River ===
The railroad reached the Ohio River in 1852, 24 years after the project started. From the railroad's founding, one of its primary goals was to link the East Coast transportation hub of Baltimore across the Ohio River to Midwestern states. By crossing the Appalachian Mountains, a technical challenge, the railroad would link the new and booming territories of what at the time was the West, including Ohio, Indiana, and Kentucky, with the east coast rail and boat network, from Maryland northward. There was no rail link between Maryland and Virginia until the B&O opened the Harpers Ferry bridge in 1839.

Beginning in 1825, the Erie Canal provided an animal-powered water facility, connecting New York City with Ohio via Lake Erie. It took ten days to travel downstream from Buffalo, New York, to New York City. The Cumberland Road, later the beginning of the federally financed National Road, provided a road link for animal-powered transport between Cumberland, Maryland, on the Potomac River and Wheeling, Virginia, in present-day West Virginia, on the Ohio River, when it was completed in 1837. It was the second paved road in the country. However, the 1831 DeWitt Clinton locomotive, running between Albany and Schenectady, New York, demonstrated speeds of 25 miles per hour (40 km/h), dramatically decreasing the cost of transportation and announcing the coming end of the canal and turnpike (road) systems, many of which were never completed since they were or would soon be obsolete.

In New York, political support for the Erie Canal detracted from the prospect of building a railroad to replace it, whose full length did not open until 1844. Mountains in Pennsylvania made construction in the western part of the state expensive and technically challenging; the Pennsylvania Railroad, linking Pittsburgh and Philadelphia, did not open its full length until 1852, and there was no rail link west from Pittsburgh to Ohio for several more years.

The fast-growing port city of Baltimore, Maryland, faced economic stagnation unless it opened a route to the Western states. On February 27, 1827, twenty-five merchants and bankers studied the best means of restoring "that portion of the Western trade which has recently been diverted from it by the introduction of steam navigation". Their answer was to build a railroad: one of the first commercial lines in the world.

Their plans worked well, despite many political problems from canal backers and other railroads. Only the Pennsylvania Railroad was allowed to build in its namesake state, requiring the B&O to skirt around a corner of the state, even though the Pennsylvania Railroad didn't even operate in that area of Pennsylvania.

The railroad grew from a capital base of $3 million in 1827 (equivalent to $85 million in 2025) to a large enterprise generating $2.7 million of annual profit on its 380 miles (610 km) of track in 1854, with 19 million passenger miles. The railroad fed tens of millions of dollars of shipments to and from Baltimore and its growing hinterland to the west, thus making the city the commercial and financial capital of the region south of Philadelphia.

=== Charters ===
Although the Albany and Schenectady Railroad was chartered a year earlier, in 1826, the B & O Railroad was the first to open in the US. Philip E. Thomas and George Brown were the pioneers of the railroad. In 1826, they investigated railway enterprises in England, which were at that time being tested in a comprehensive fashion as commercial ventures. Their investigation completed, they held an organizational meeting on February 12, 1827, including about twenty-five citizens, most of whom were Baltimore merchants or bankers. Chapter 123 of the 1826 Session Laws of Maryland, passed February 28, 1827, and the Commonwealth of Virginia on March 8, 1827, chartered the Baltimore and Ohio Rail Road Company, with the task of building a railroad from the port of Baltimore west to a suitable point on the Ohio River. The railroad, formally incorporated April 24, was intended to provide a faster route for Midwestern goods to reach the East Coast than to the hugely successful but slow Erie Canal across upstate New York. Thomas was elected as the first president and Brown the treasurer. The capital of the proposed company was fixed at $5 million, but the B&O was initially capitalized in 1827 with a $3 million issue of stock. Half of this stock was reserved for the Maryland state government, which invested $1,000,000, and the municipal government of Baltimore, which invested $500,000. The remaining private equity was purchased by around 22,000 people, equivalent to one-quarter of the city's population at the time.

=== Early construction and legal battles ===
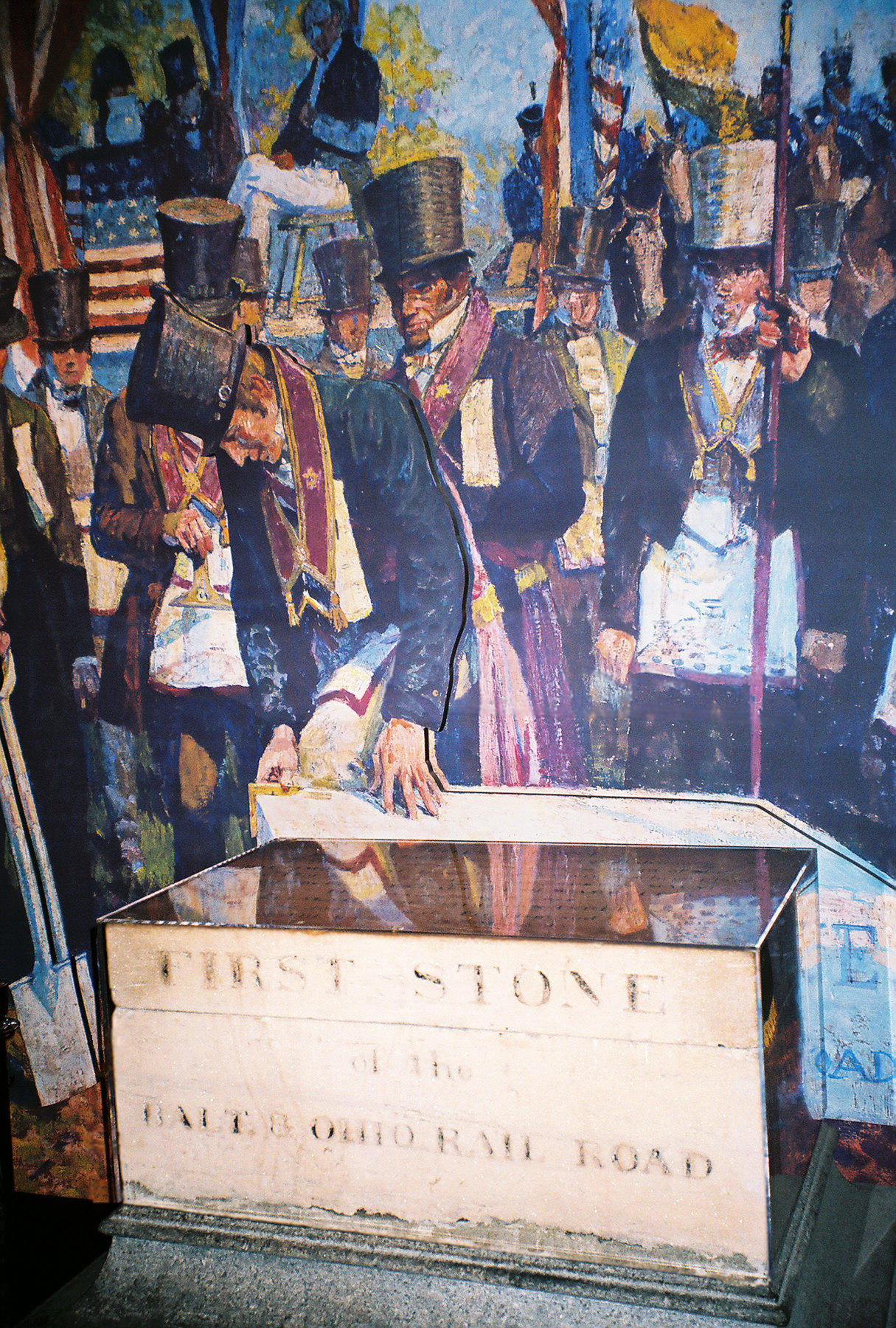
The Baltimore and Ohio Railroad cornerstone is displayed at the National Museum of Railroad History & Innovation under a painting depicting Charles Carroll of Carrollton, the last living signer of the Declaration of Independence, at a groundbreaking ceremony on July 4, 1828.

Construction began on July 4, 1828.

The initial tracks were built with granite stringers topped by strap iron rails. The first section, from Baltimore west to Ellicott's Mills (now known as Ellicott City), opened on May 24, 1830. While a steam locomotive (Tom Thumb) was demonstrated on the B&O in 1830, the railroad did not switch to steam until 1831, and the first trains on the 26-mile (42 km) round trip to Ellicott's Mills were pulled by horses.

From Ellicott's Mills, the railroad followed the Patapsco River upstream to a high point near Parr's Ridge (now known as Mount Airy), where it descended into the Monocacy and Potomac river valleys. Further extensions opened to Frederick (including the short Frederick Branch) on December 1, 1831; Point of Rocks on April 2, 1832; and Sandy Hook on December 1, 1834. Sandy Hook, on the north bank of the Potomac, remained the end of the line until 1836 when the railroad opened its bridge over the Potomac River to reach Harpers Ferry (then Virginia, now West Virginia). A connection at Harpers Ferry with the Winchester and Potomac Railroad, running southwest to Winchester, Virginia, opened in 1837.

Pushing west from Harpers Ferry, the B&O reached Martinsburg in May 1842; Hancock in June 1842; and Cumberland on November 5, 1842, which remained the end of the line for a number of years. Additional sections opened to Piedmont on July 21, 1851, and Fairmont on June 22, 1852. Later that year, the B&O finally reached the Ohio River at Moundsville, where port facilities were built, followed shortly later by Wheeling (then Virginia, now West Virginia) on January 1, 1853. Wheeling remained the terminus through the American Civil War until a bridge could be constructed across the Ohio River.

The narrow strip of available land along the Potomac River between Point of Rocks and Harpers Ferry caused years of legal battles between the B&O and the Chesapeake and Ohio (C&O) Canal, as both sought to exclude the other from its use. A compromise eventually allowed the two companies to share the right of way. The B&O also prevailed in a lawsuit brought against it by the Washington and Baltimore Turnpike Road.

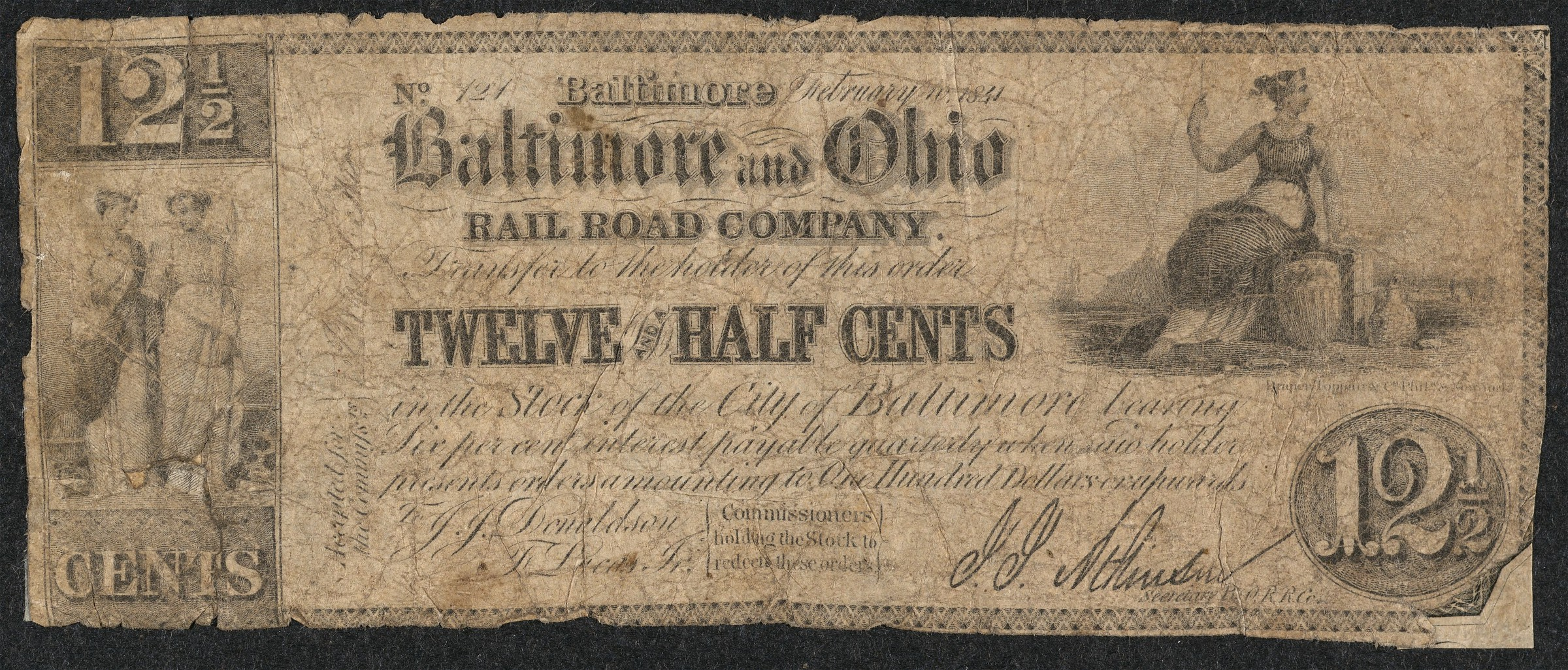
Twelve and a half cent note issued by the Baltimore and Ohio Railroad Company in 1841.

The B&O wanted links to Virginia's Shenandoah Valley, as well as the parts of western Virginia draining into the Ohio River valley and ultimately the Mississippi River, such as Wheeling (where the National Road crossed the Ohio River) and the Kanawha River valley. However, many Virginia politicians wanted the minerals, timber and produce of those areas to instead ship through Richmond and reach the Atlantic through Norfolk, although the James River Canal required substantial maintenance and was never completed through the Appalachians to the Ohio River watershed. Thus, while the B&O reached Wheeling in 1853, political compromises meant the B&O would only reach Grafton to connect to Parkersburg on the Ohio River through a connection with the Northwestern Virginia Railroad which was completed in 1857. During the "Great Railway Celebrations of 1857", a large group of notables boarded the B&O in Baltimore, then transferred to steamboats that took them from Wheeling to Marietta, Ohio, where they boarded a railroad to Cincinnati, where after another celebration, they boarded the Ohio and Mississippi Railroad, which brought them to St. Louis, Missouri, three days after they had started their journey. The B&O would only reach Charleston (at the confluence of the Kanawha and Elk Rivers) and ultimately Huntington (which was named after a major B&O investor) on the Ohio River more than a decade after the American Civil War and the creation of the state of West Virginia.

Meanwhile, the State of Maryland granted the B&O a charter to build a line from Baltimore to Washington, D.C., in 1831, and the Washington Branch was opened in 1835. This line joined to the original mainline at Relay, Maryland, crossing the Patapsco River on the Thomas Viaduct (which remains one of the B&O's signature structures). This line was partially funded by the state of Maryland, and was operated separately until the 1870s, with Maryland receiving a 25 percent cut of gross passenger receipts. The B&O's charter also forbade further taxation of the railroad, and that no-tax provision was upheld in the 1840s after Baltimore City tried to tax it. This Washington Branch line was built in stone, much like the original mainline. By this time, however, strap rail was no longer used for new construction. Most of the stone bridges on the Old Main Line did not last long, being washed out by the periodic flooding of the Patapsco River and replaced at first by Bollman Truss bridges. The Annapolis and Elk Ridge Railroad to Annapolis connected to this line at Annapolis Junction in 1840. As an unwritten condition for the charter, it was understood that the state of Maryland would not charter any competing line between Baltimore and Washington, and no such charters were approved until well after the American Civil War, when the Pennsylvania Railroad acquired a railroad on the Delmarva Peninsula, which had the power to build short branch lines, so it was able to connect to Washington through Bowie, Maryland.

The B&O also wanted access to Pittsburgh and coal fields in western Pennsylvania and Ohio. Although the directors of the Pennsylvania Railroad sought a monopoly in their state, delays in laying track to Pittsburgh led the Pennsylvania legislature in 1846 to require construction to be completed within 10 years, else competition would be allowed. The Pennsylvania Railroad finished its trans-Allegheny track with two years to spare. Denied a direct route to Pittsburgh, the B&O supported development of the Pittsburgh and Connellsville Railroad, under the leadership of former B&O Chief Engineer Benjamin Latrobe, eventually gaining full control when the final connection to Cumberland, Maryland, was completed in 1871.

In the early 20th century, F. A. Durban, a former president of the DT&I and Ann Arbor railroads, served as general counsel until his sudden death in 1915 at age 60.

=== Early engineering ===
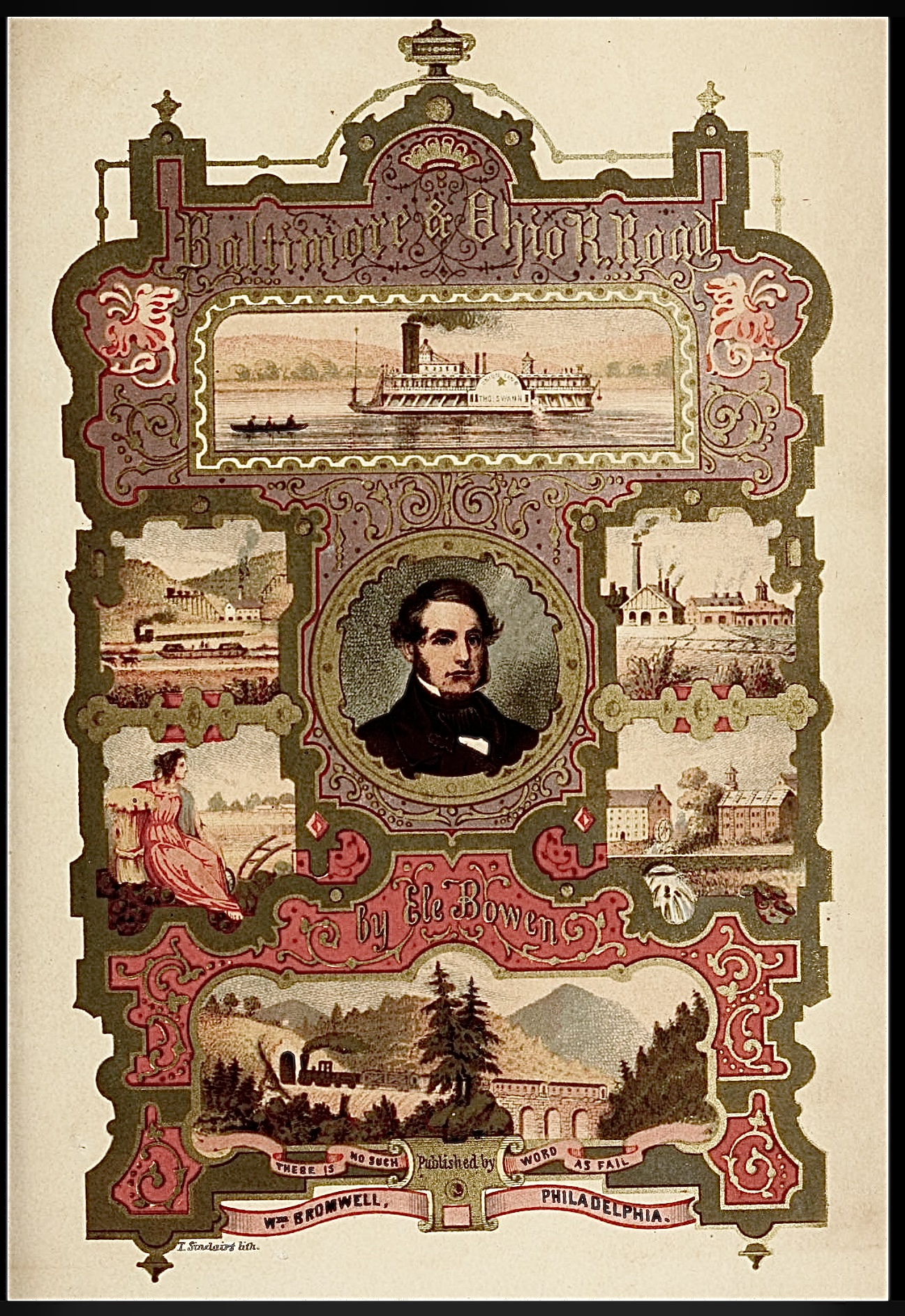
Scenes of the B&O Railroad. Decorative title page for Ele Bowen, Rambles in the Path of the Steam-Horse, 1855

When construction began on the B&O in the 1820s, railroad engineering was in its infancy. Unsure exactly which materials would suffice, the B&O erred on the side of sturdiness and built many of its early structures of granite. Even the track bed to which the iron strap rail was affixed consisted of stone.

Though the granite soon proved too unforgiving and expensive for track, most of the B&O's monumental bridges have survived to this day, and many are still in active railroad use by CSX. Baltimore's Carrollton Viaduct, named in honor of Charles Carroll of Carrollton, was the B&O's first bridge, and is the oldest railway bridge in the Americas still carrying trains (and the third oldest in the world, after the Skerne Bridge, Darlington, UK, of 1824–1825, and the Bassaleg Viaduct, Newport, UK, of 1826). The Thomas Viaduct at Relay, Maryland, was the longest bridge in the United States upon its completion in 1835. It also remains in use. The B&O made extensive use of the Bollman iron truss bridge design in the mid-19th century. Its durability and ease of assembly aided faster railroad construction.

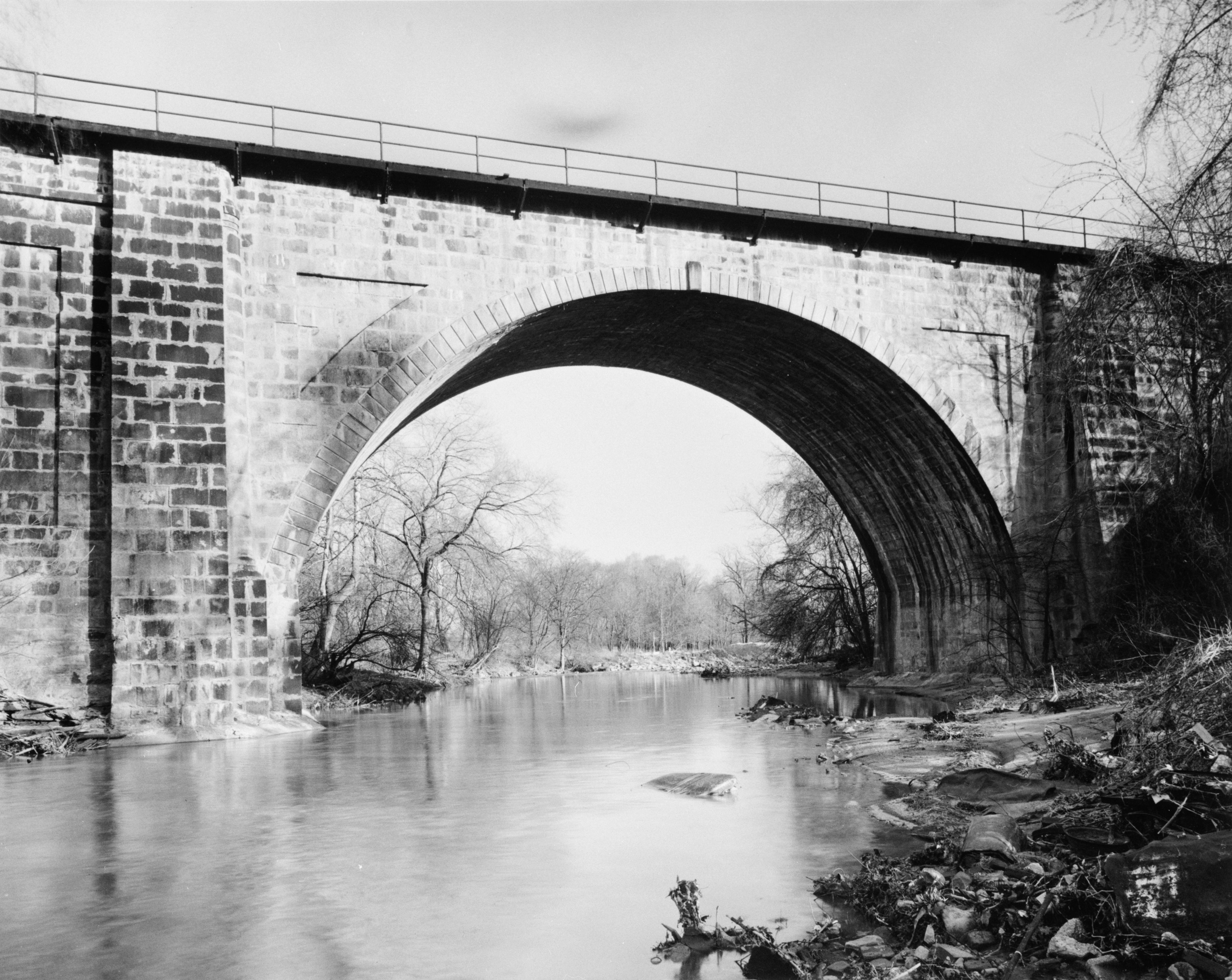
Carrollton Viaduct

As the B&O built the main line west to Parr's Ridge, near Mount Airy, Maryland, it had limited information about the capabilities of steam locomotives; at the time, the line had three, the York, Atlantic, and the Franklin. When planning the extension to Sandy Hook, Maryland, and then Harpers Ferry, the company was uncertain if the engines' metal wheels would grip the metal rails sufficiently to pull a train up to the top of the ridge. The railroad decided to construct two inclined planes, one on each side of the ridge, along which teams of horses, and perhaps steam-powered winches, would assist pulling the trains uphill. The planes, about a mile long on each side, quickly proved an operational bottleneck. Before the decade of the 1830s ended, the B&O built a 5.5-mile-long (8.9 km) alternate route that became known as the Mount Airy Loop. The planes were quickly abandoned and forgotten, though some artifacts survive to the present.

=== First telegraph line ===
In 1843, Congress appropriated $30,000 for construction of an experimental 38-mile (61 km) telegraph line between Washington, D.C., and Baltimore along the B&O's right-of-way. The B&O approved the project with the agreement that the railroad would have free use of the line upon its completion. An impressive demonstration occurred on May 1, 1844, when news of the Whig Party's nomination of Henry Clay for U.S. president was telegraphed from the party's convention in Baltimore to the Capitol Building in Washington. On May 24, 1844, the line was officially opened as Samuel F. B. Morse sent his famous words, "What hath God wrought", from the B&O's Mount Clare station to the Capitol by telegraph.

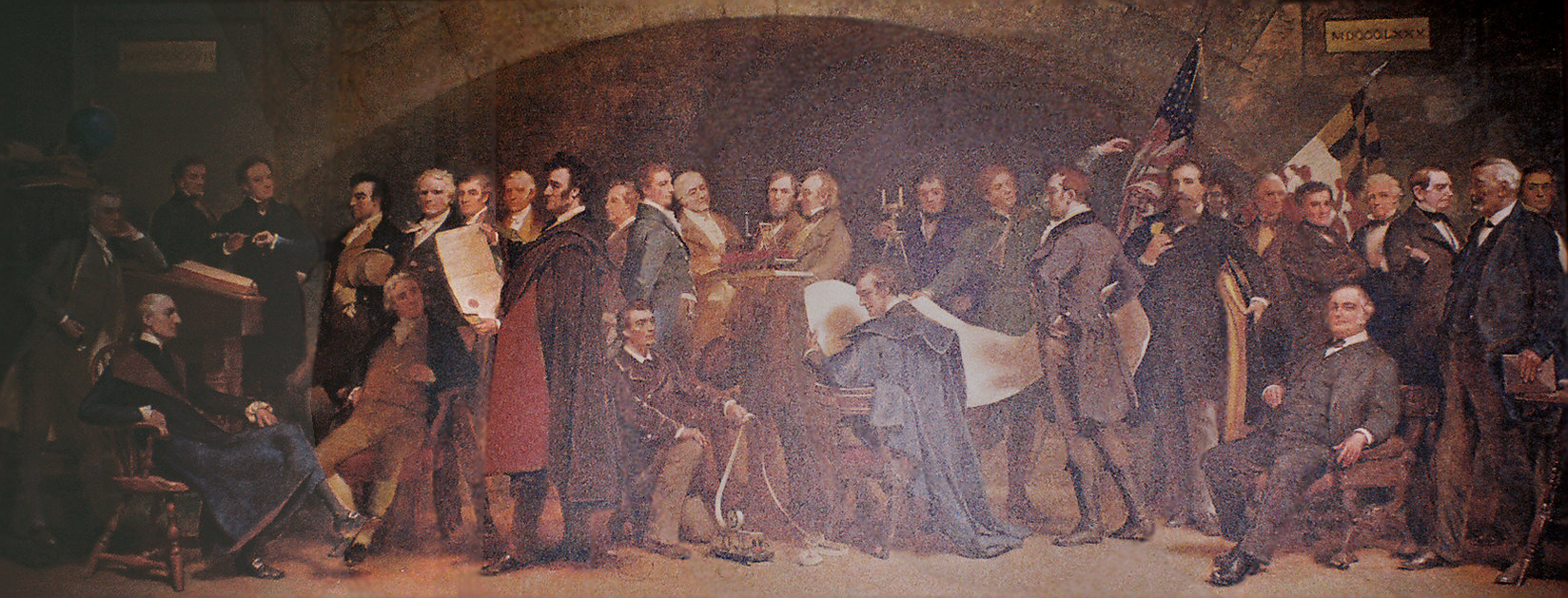
Francis Blackwell Mayer. The Founders of the Baltimore and Ohio Railroad (1891), represents the B&O's history (left to right) beginning with its founding in 1827 to 1880. Philip E. Thomas, George Brown, Charles Carroll of Carrollton, and others are gathered at left. Samuel F. B. Morse is seated at center left (with telegraph tape) and John W. Garrett is seated at right. The original painting is now at the headquarters of CSX Transportation in Jacksonville, Florida. A replica is at the National Museum of Railroad History & Innovation.

=== Innovations ===
Contrary to legend, the B&O was not the first chartered railroad in the United States; John Stevens obtained a charter for the New Jersey Railroad in 1815. The B&O was, however, the first company to operate a locomotive built in America, with the Tom Thumb in 1829. It built the first passenger and freight station (Mount Clare in 1829) and was the first railroad to earn passenger revenues in December 1829, and publish a timetable on May 23, 1830. On Christmas Eve 1852, the B&O line was completed between Baltimore and the Ohio River near Moundsville, West Virginia.

=== Conflicts in the early years ===
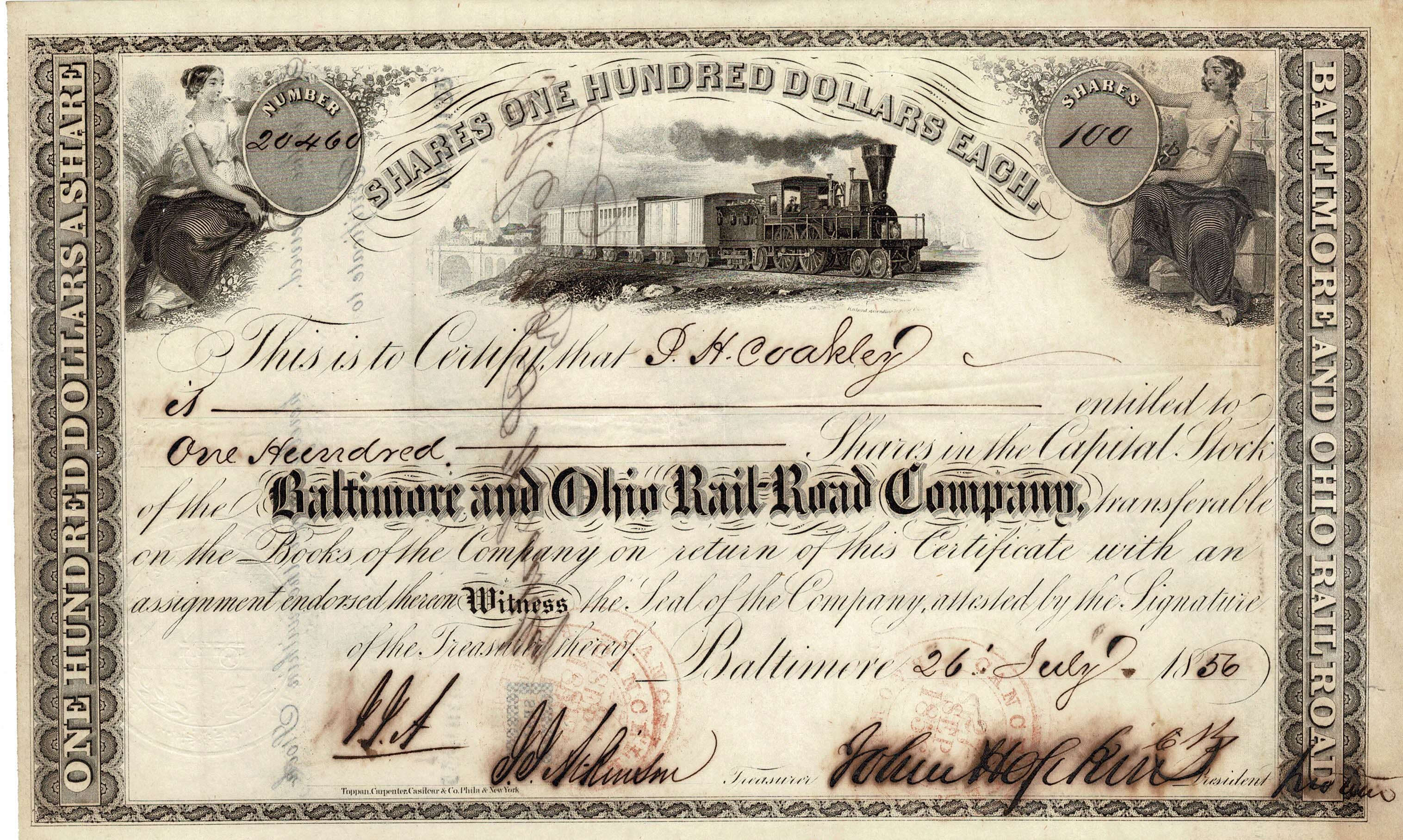
Share of the Baltimore and Ohio Rail-Road Company, issued 26. July 1856; signed by Johns Hopkins as president pro. tem.

Partial government ownership caused some operational problems. Of the thirty members on its board of directors, twelve were elected by shareholders, while eighteen were appointed either by Maryland or the Baltimore City Council. Many had conflicting interests: the directors appointed by the state and city desired low fares and all construction to be funded from corporate revenues, while the directors elected by shareholders desired greater profits and dividends. These conflicts became more intense in the 1850s after the completion of the C&O Canal, which brought additional competition to the B&O. In 1853, after being nominated by large shareholder and director Johns Hopkins, John W. Garrett became president of the B&O, a position he would hold until his death in 1884. In the first year of his presidency, corporate operating costs were reduced from 65 percent of revenues to 46 percent, and the railroad began distributing profits to its shareholders.

=== John Brown's raid on Harpers Ferry ===
The B&O played a major role, and got national attention, in the response to abolitionist John Brown's raid on Harpers Ferry, Virginia (since 1863, West Virginia), in October 1859. Black porter Hayward Shepherd, to whom there is a monument in Harpers Ferry, was the first man killed; stationmaster Fontaine Beckham, who was also the town's mayor, was killed the next day. Raiders had cut the telegraph line, and stopped the 1:30 am Wheeling to Baltimore express, but after several hours the train was allowed to continue and at the first station with a working telegraph (Monocacy) the conductor sent a telegram to B&O headquarters. After confirming from the Martinsburg station (via Wheeling, because of the cut telegraph line) that the report was not a hoax, Garrett telegraphed President James Buchanan, the Secretary of War, the Governor of Virginia, and Maryland Militia General George Hume Steuart about the insurrection in progress. The B&O made its rolling stock available to the military. At 3:20 pm a train left Washington Depot with 87 U.S. Marines and two howitzers, and a 3:45 p.m. train from nearer Frederick, Maryland, carried three Maryland militia companies under Col. Edward Shriver. These trains stopped before the bridge at Sandy Hook, Maryland (end of the line before the bridge was built), and troops continued across the bridge on foot. Soon Garrett's Master of Transportation William Prescott Smith left Baltimore City, together with Maryland Gen. Charles G. Egerton Jr. and the Second Light Brigade, which train also picked up the Marines on the federal troop train at the junction in Relay, Maryland. All awaited Lt. Col. Robert E. Lee and Lt. J.E.B. Stuart, who had received orders from the Secretary of War to retake Harpers Ferry and capture the insurgent abolitionists, which they quickly did. Garrett reported with evident relief the next day that aside from the cut telegraph line, which was quickly repaired, there had been no damage to any B&O track, equipment, or facilities.

The government of Maryland published in a book the many telegrams sent by B&O employees and management during the raid.

=== American Civil War ===
At the outset of the Civil War, the B&O possessed 236 locomotives, 128 passenger coaches, 3,451 rail cars and 513 miles (826 km) of rail road, all in states south of the Mason–Dixon line, as Garrett had noted before the war began. Although many Marylanders had Southern sympathies, Garrett and Hopkins supported the Union. The B&O became crucial to the Federal government during the Civil War, being the main rail connection between Washington, D.C., and the northern states, especially west of the Appalachian mountains.

However, its initial problem became Lincoln's first Secretary of War, Simon Cameron, a major stockholder in the rival North Central Railroad, which received long haul freight destined for Baltimore from the rival Pennsylvania Railroad. Furthermore, the Pennsylvania Railroad and other investors sought permission to construct rail lines which threatened the B&O's monopolies on the Washington Branch (between Relay and Washington DC) and westward through Cumberland, Maryland. Raids and battles during the war also cost the B&O substantial losses, many never indemnified. Master of Transportation Prescott Smith kept a diary during the war years, describing incidents such as the June 1861 derailment of a 50 car coal train, which plunged into a ravine after a bridge was destroyed (the wreckage burned for months and melted the metal coal hoppers), as well as later ironclad trains (one only disabled by an artillery shell piercing the boiler).

==== 1861–1862 ====
On April 18, 1861, the day after Virginia seceded from the Union, Virginia militia seized the federal arsenal at Harpers Ferry, which was also an important work station on the B&O's main westward line. The following day, Confederate rioters in Baltimore attempted to prevent Pennsylvania volunteers from proceeding from the North Central Railway's Bolton station to the B&O's Mount Clare station, and Maryland's governor Hicks and Baltimore Mayor George W. Brown ordered 3 North Central and 2 Philadelphia, Wilmington and Baltimore Railroad (PW&B) bridges destroyed to prevent further federal troop movements through (and riots in) the city. Soon B&O president John Work Garrett received letters from Virginia's Governor John Letcher telling the B&O to pass no federal troops destined for any place in Virginia over the railroad, and threatening to confiscate the lines. Charles Town's mayor also wrote, threatening to cut the B&O's main line by destroying the long bridge over the Potomac River at Harpers Ferry, and Garrett also received anonymous threats. Thus he and others asked Secretary of War Cameron to protect the B&O as the national capitol's main westward link. Cameron instead warned Garrett that passage of any rebel troops over his line would be treason. The Secretary of War agreed to station troops to protect the North Central, the Pennsylvania Railroad, and even the PW&B, but flatly refused to help the B&O, his main competition.

The B&O had to repair damaged line at its own expense, and often received late or no payment for services rendered to the federal government. In May, CSA Colonel Jackson's operations against the B&O Railroad (1861) began. Stonewall Jackson initially permitted B&O trains to operate during limited hours over the approximately 100 miles (160 km) from Point of Rocks to Cumberland. On June 20, 1861, Jackson's Confederates seized Martinsburg, a major B&O work center, having blown up the Harpers Ferry railroad bridge on June 14. Confederates confiscated dozens of locomotives and train cars and ripped up double track in order to ship rails for Confederate use in Virginia (14 locomotives and 83 rail cars were dismantled and sent south, and another 42 locomotives and 386 rail cars damaged or destroyed at Martinsburg, with the B&O water station and machine shops also destroyed and 102 miles (164 km) miles of telegraph wire removed by the time federal control was restored in March 1862). By the end of 1861, 23 B&O railroad bridges had been burned and 36.5 miles (58.7 km) of track were torn up or destroyed.

Since Jackson cut the B&O main line into Washington for more than six months, the North Central and Pennsylvania Railroads profited from overflow traffic, even as many B&O trains stood idle in Baltimore. Garrett tried to use his government contacts to secure the needed protection, from Maryland Delegate Reverdy Johnson to General George McClellan and Treasury Secretary Salmon P. Chase. As winter began, coal prices soared in Washington, even though the B&O in September arranged for free coal transport from its Cumberland, Maryland, terminal down the C&O Canal (which reduced prices somewhat, although Confederates also damaged the C&O canal that winter). Furthermore, western farmers could not get their produce to markets because of the B&O shutdown, only partially alleviated by the summer 1861 Union army victories at the Battle of Philippi (West Virginia) and Rich Mountain, and vigorous army and company work crews which reduced the main-line gap to 25 miles between Harpers Ferry and Back Creek.

Finally at year end, Samuel M. Felton, the PW&B President, wrote newspapers about the War Department's discrimination against his cooperating railroad line, which competed with Cameron's favored North Central and Pennsylvania Railroads. President Lincoln (familiar with railroad law since his days as an Illinois lawyer) in January 1862 replaced Cameron with Pennsylvania lawyer Edwin M. Stanton, who had been serving as Cameron's legal advisor. Furthermore, on January 31, 1862, Congress passed the Railways and Telegraph Act of January 31, 1862, creating the United States Military Railroad and allowing it to seize and operate any railroad or telegraph company's equipment, although Stanton and USMRR Superintendent Daniel McCallum would take a "team of rivals" approach to railroad management and allow civilian operations to continue. In February 1862, Union forces recaptured Martinsburg and Harpers Ferry, and work crews continued replacing wrecked bridges and equipment, although bushwhacker raids continued. Even then train movements were sporadic and subject to frequent stoppages, derailments, capture and attack. Prominent raids on the B&O railroad during this period were:

- The Great Train Raid of 1861, May 22 – June 23, 1861
- The Romney Expedition, January 1 through January 24, 1862
- Operations during the Maryland Campaign, September 8, 1862
- Various raids of Brigadier General A. G. Jenkins, Fall, 1862

B&O Locomotives Captured During the Great Train Raid of 1861
| Engine Name | Eng. No. | Type |
|---|---|---|
| ? | No. 17 | Norris 4-2-0 |
| ? | No. 34 | Mason 4-4-0 |
| ? | No. 187 | Camel 0-8-0 |
| Lady Davis (CSA name) | No. 188 | Tyson 4-4-0 "Dutch Wagon" |
| ? | No. 193 | Camel 0-8-0 |
| ? | No. 198 | Hayes Camel 0-8-0 |
| ? | No. 199 | Camel 0-8-0 |
| ? | No. 201 | ? |

==== 1863–1865 ====
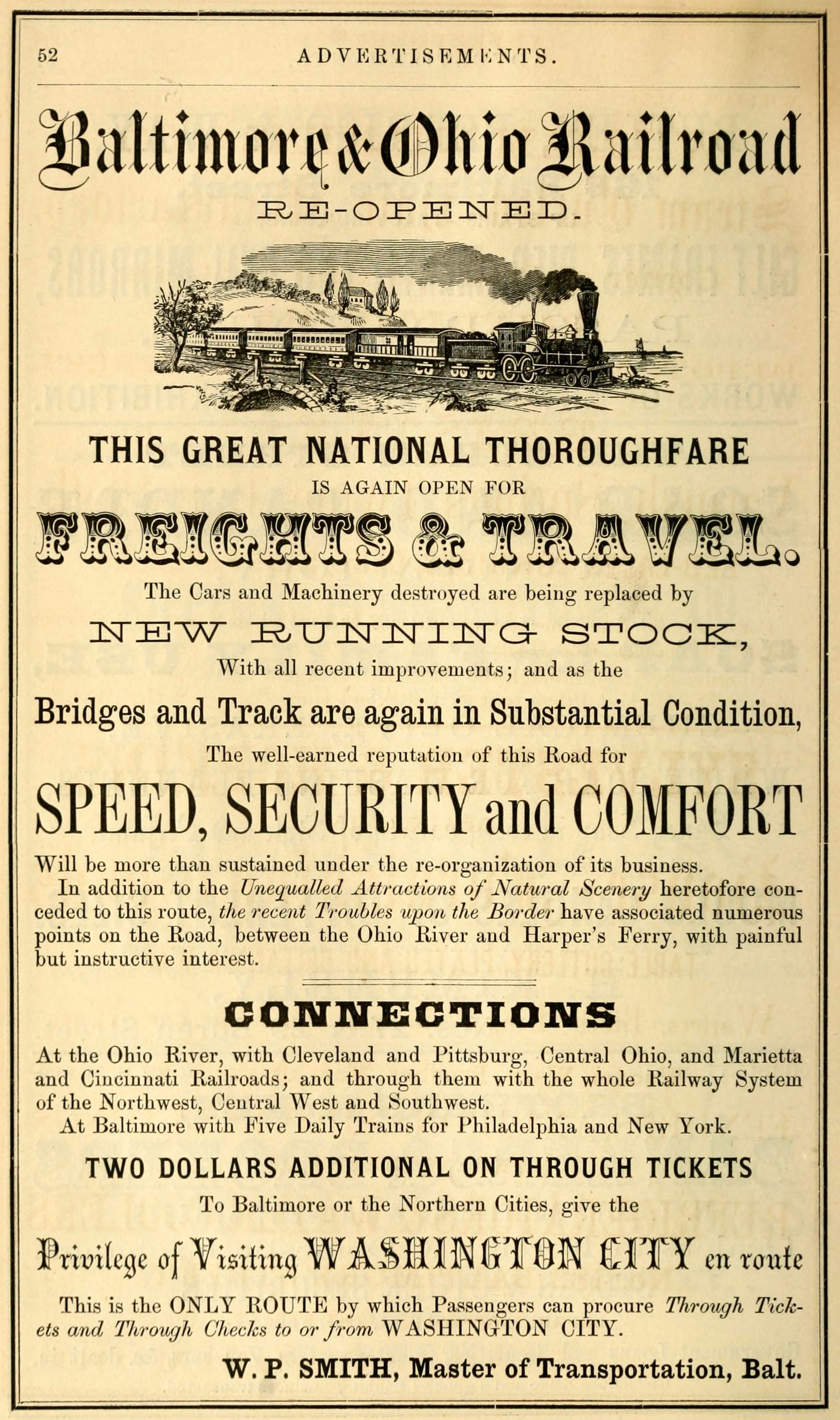
Advertisement for the Baltimore and Ohio in an 1864 Baltimore city directory, promoting its repairs and reopening at one point during the war.

The second half of the Civil War was characterized by near-continuous raiding, which severely hampered the Union defense of Washington, D.C. Union forces and leaders often failed to properly secure the region, despite the B&O's vital importance to the Union cause.

There is no interest suffering here except the Baltimore and Ohio Railroad and I will not divide my forces to protect it.

— General Philip Sheridan

This military strategy, or lack thereof, allowed Confederate commanders to contribute significantly to the length of the war, by conducting free-ranging military operations against the region and railroad.

Before the Battle of Monocacy, B&O agents began reporting Confederate troop movements eleven days prior to the battle, and Garrett had their intelligence passed to authorities in the War Department and to Major General Lew Wallace, who commanded the department responsible for defense of the area. As preparations for the battle progressed, the B&O provided transport for federal troops and munitions, and on two occasions Garrett was contacted directly by President Abraham Lincoln for further information. Though Union forces lost this battle, the delay allowed Ulysses S. Grant to successfully repel the Confederate attack on Washington at the Battle of Fort Stevens two days later. After the battle, Lincoln paid tribute to Garrett as:

The right arm of the Federal Government in the aid he rendered the authorities in preventing the Confederates from seizing Washington and securing its retention as the Capital of the Loyal States.

— Abraham Lincoln

- The Jones-Imboden Raid, April 24 through May 22, 1863
- The Catoctin Station Raid, June 17, 1863
- The First Calico Raid, June 19, 1863
- The B&O Raid on Duffield Station, January 1864
- The McNeill Raid, May 5, 1864
- The Second Calico Raid, July 3, 1864
- The Battle of Monocacy, July 9, 1864
- Gilmor's Raid, July 11, 1864
- The Greenback Raid, by Mosby's Rangers on October 14, 1864
- The B&O Raid on Duffield Station II, January 1865
- Gilmor's B&O Raid, February 1865
- The B&O Derailment Raid, March 1865

The Confederate leaders who led these operations and specifically targeted the railroad included:

- Lieutenant General Thomas J. "Stonewall" Jackson and many units under his command
- Lieutenant General Jubal Anderson Early and many units under his command
- Brigadier General Turner Ashby and his "Black Horse" cavalry
- Brigadier General John D. Imboden and the 62nd Virginia Mounted Infantry (1st Partisan Rangers)
- Brigadier General Albert G. Jenkins and the 8th Virginia Cavalry
- Brigadier General William E. "Grumble" Jones and the "Laurel Brigade"
- Colonel John S. Mosby's "Mosby's Rangers"
- Major Harry Gilmor's "Gilmor's Raiders"
- Captain John H. McNeill's "McNeill's Rangers"

Bases of operation involved in raiding the B&O Railroad:

- Winchester, Virginia
- Harpers Ferry, West Virginia

=== Westward by merger ===
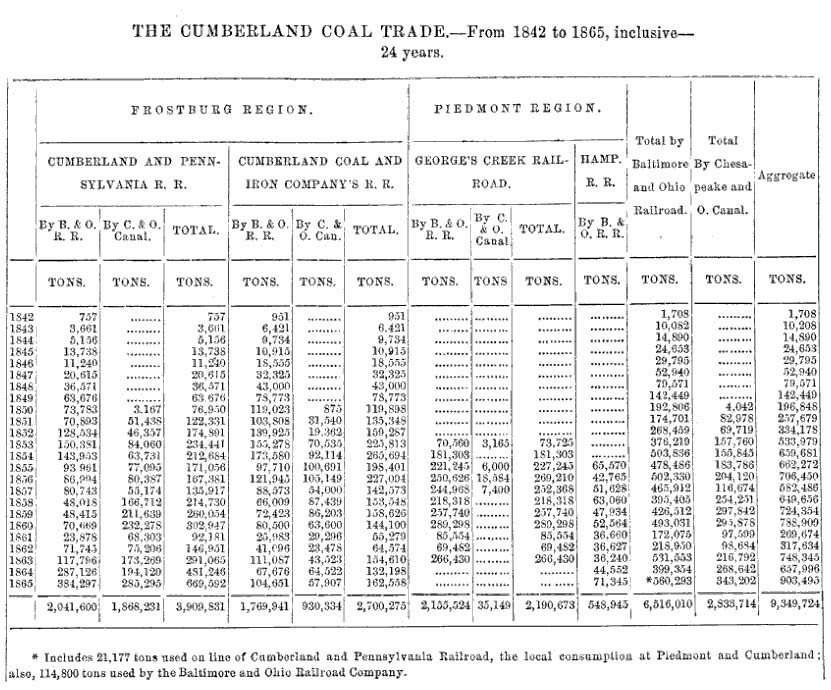
Table of Cumberland Coal shipped over B&O Railroad and C&O Canal, 1842–1865

A steel and stone bridge was built across the Ohio River between Bellaire, Ohio, and Wheeling, West Virginia, in 1871, connecting the B&O to the Central Ohio Railroad, which the B&O had leased starting in 1866. This provided a direct rail connection to Columbus, Ohio, and the lease marked the beginning of a series of expansions to the west and north.

Other railroads included in the B&O were:

- Northwestern Virginia Railroad from 1865
- Winchester and Potomac Railroad and Winchester and Strasburg Railroad from 1867. This pair of lines connected with the B&O at Harper's Ferry, West Virginia, and constituted the only significant B&O trackage in present-day Virginia.
- Sandusky, Mansfield and Newark Railroad leased through the Central Ohio in 1869
- Hempfield Railroad, bought on May 1, 1871. The company was reorganized as the Wheeling, Pittsburg, and Baltimore on May 3, 1871. The subsequent acquisition of the Pittsburgh Southern enabled a direct Pittsburgh to Wheeling connection.
- Pittsburgh and Connellsville Railroad from 1871. This was the B&O entry into Pittsburgh, overcoming the denial of a Pennsylvania charter to the B&O.
- Somerset and Cambria Railroad from 1879
- Buffalo Railroad from 1880
- Pittsburgh Southern Railroad acquired 1883. Originally a narrow-gauge railroad, it was converted to standard gauge and renamed the Baltimore & Ohio Short Line.
- West Virginia and Pittsburgh Railroad from 1890
- Columbus and Cincinnati Midland Railroad leased through the Central Ohio in 1890
- Monongahela River Railroad from 1900
- Marietta and Cincinnati Railroad from 1882. This was initially renamed the Cincinnati, Washington and Baltimore Railroad and then again to the Baltimore and Ohio Southwestern Railroad in 1889. The B&OSW absorbed the Ohio and Mississippi Railroad in 1893, giving the B&O a connection to St. Louis, Missouri, and finally the B&OSW disappeared into the rest of the system in 1900.

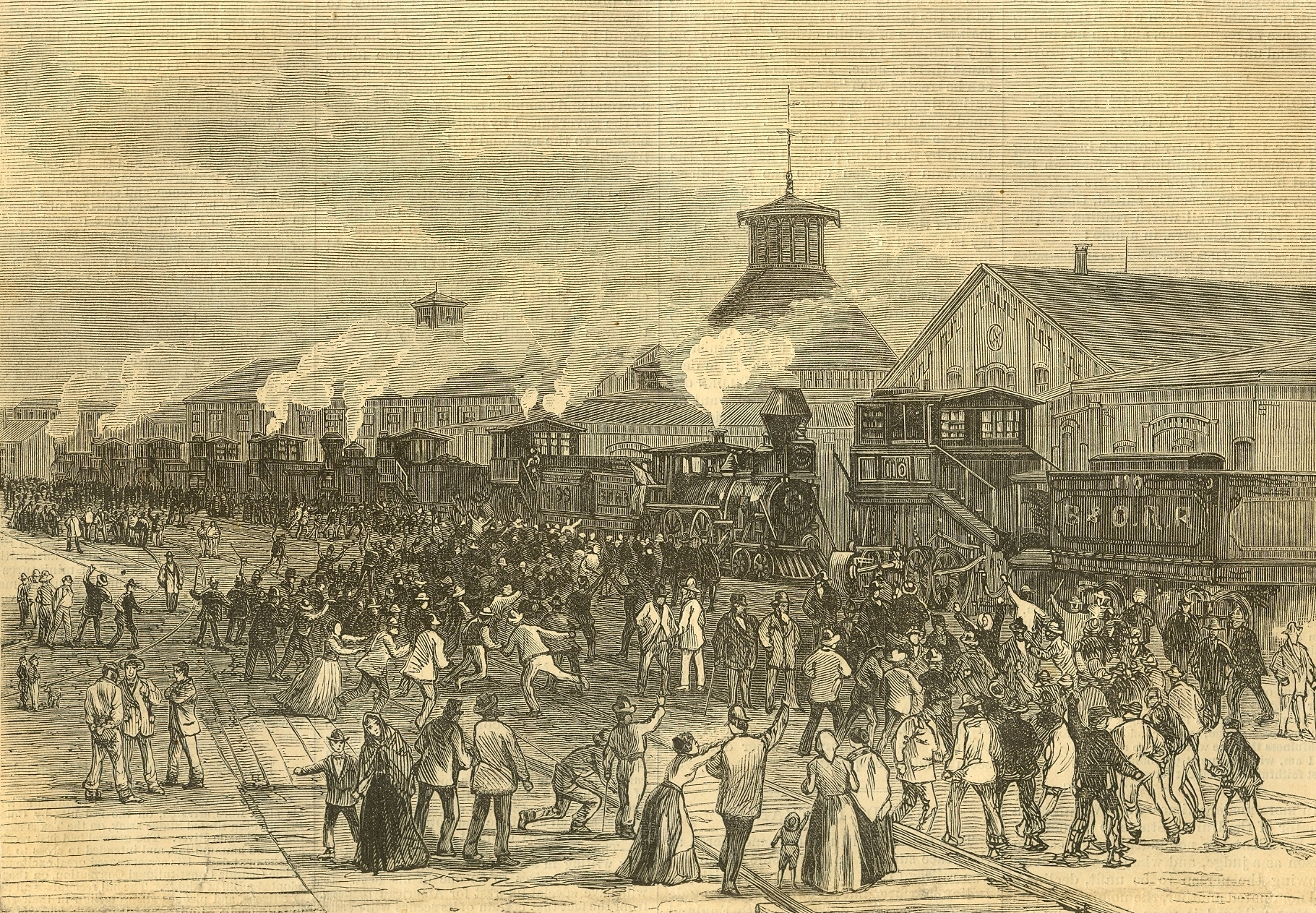
Blockade of engines at Martinsburg, West Virginia, during strike in 1877

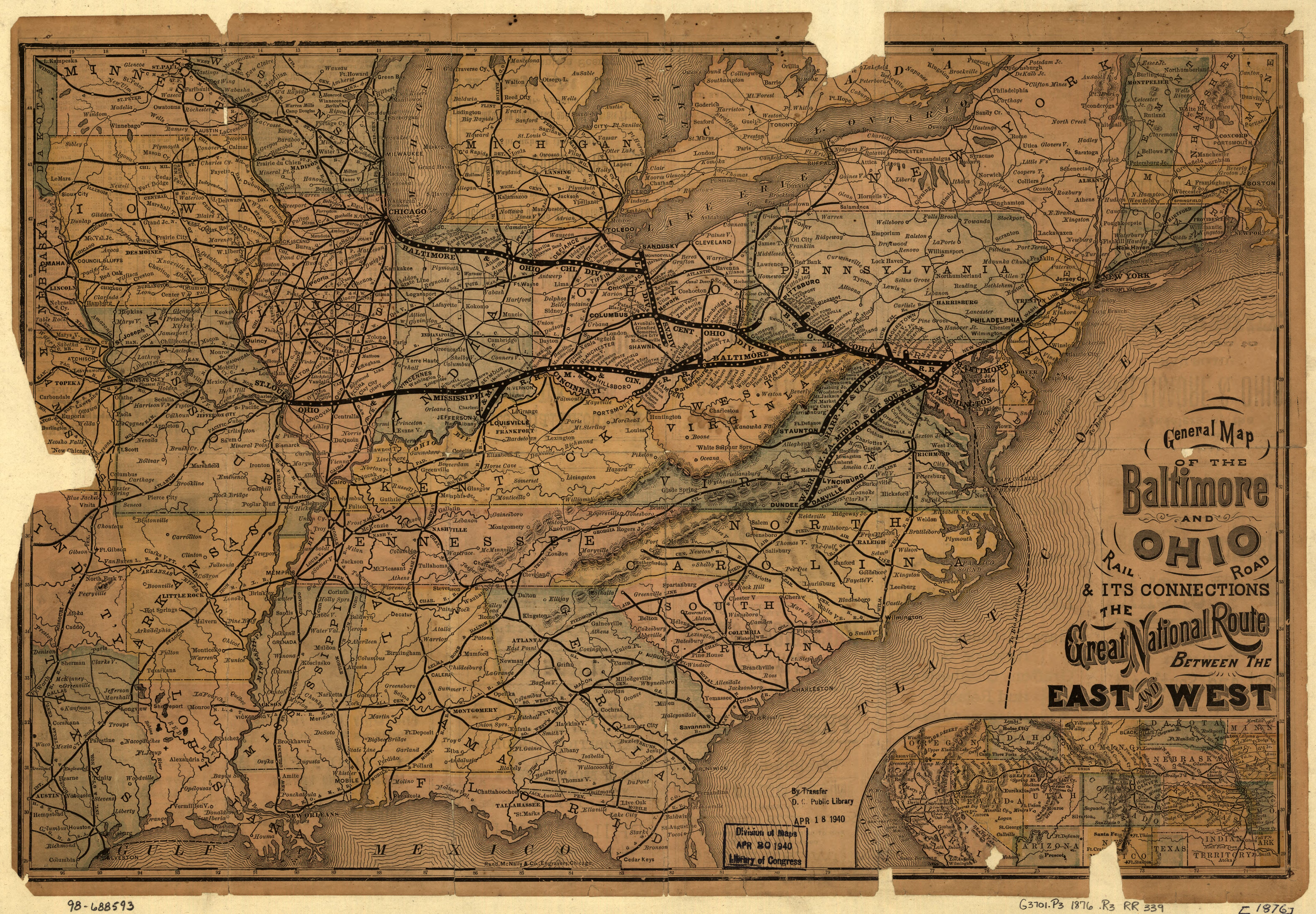
1876 B&O map

- Ohio River Railroad from 1901
- Pittsburgh Junction Railroad from 1902
- Pittsburgh and Western Railroad from 1902. This was originally a narrow-gauge system which was standard gauged from 1883 to 1911. It formed the main B&O line west from Pittsburgh. The line passed the Mars Train Station in Mars, Pennsylvania, northwest of Pittsburgh.
- Cleveland, Terminal and Valley Railway from 1895. This was the B&O's entry into Cleveland, Ohio.
- Cleveland, Lorain and Wheeling Railroad from 1909
- Chicago Terminal Transfer Company, reorganized in 1910 as the Baltimore and Ohio Chicago Terminal Railroad. This switching line was always operated as a separate company.
- Salisbury Railroad near Pittsburgh, operated from 1912
- Cincinnati, Hamilton and Dayton Railroad from 1912
- Morgantown and Kingwood Railroad from 1920
- Coal and Coke Railway from 1916
- Cincinnati, Indianapolis and Western Railroad from 1927. This was originally part of the Cincinnati, Hamilton and Dayton, and gave the B&O a connection to Springfield, Illinois.
- Buffalo, Rochester and Pittsburgh Railway in 1932. This gave the B&O a line into New York state.
- Buffalo and Susquehanna Railroad from 1932. Part of the line was severed from the rest of the system by flooding, and became part of the Wellsville, Addison and Galeton Railroad in 1955.

(This list omits certain short lines.)

The Chicago and Alton Railroad was purchased by the B&O in 1931 and renamed the Alton Railroad. It was always operated separately and was eventually bought by the Gulf, Mobile and Ohio Railroad after receivership in 1942.

=== Great Railroad Strike of 1877 ===
As a result of poor national economic conditions in the mid-1870s following the Panic of 1873, the B&O attempted to reduce its workers' wages. After a second reduction in wages was announced in the same year, workers began the Great Railroad Strike of 1877 on July 14 in Martinsburg, West Virginia. Striking workers would not allow any of the trains, mainly freight trains, to roll until the third wage cut was revoked. West Virginia Governor Henry M. Mathews sent in state militia units to restore train service but the soldiers refused to fire on the strikers. The strike spread to Cumberland, and when Maryland Governor John Lee Carroll attempted to put down the strike by sending the state militia from Baltimore, riots broke out resulting in 11 deaths, the burning of parts of Camden station, and damage to several engines and cars. The next day workers in Pittsburgh staged a sympathy strike that was also met with an assault by the state militia; Pittsburgh then erupted into widespread rioting. The strike ended after federal troops and state militias restored order.

=== New lines in Maryland ===
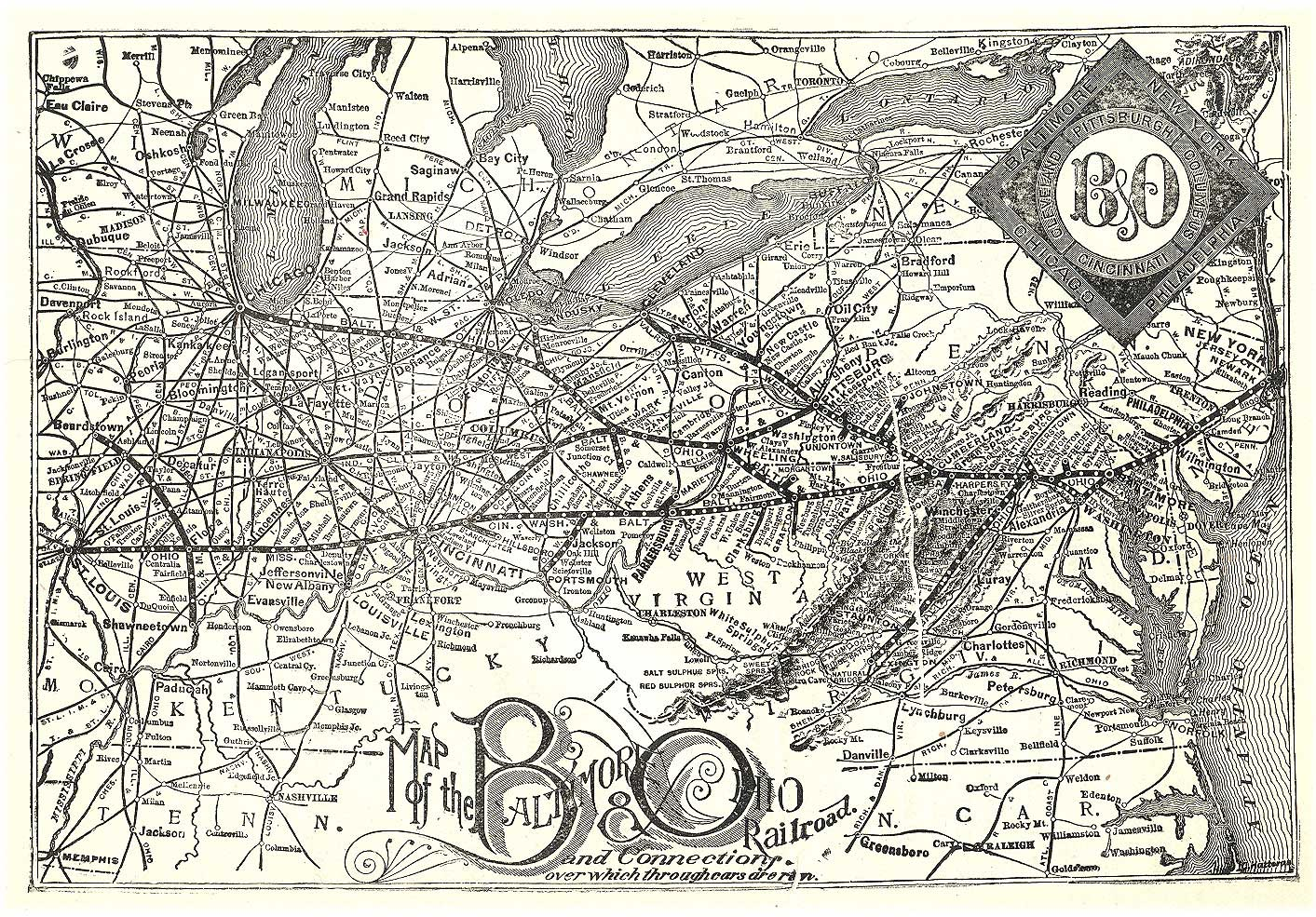
B&O route map of 1891

In 1866 the B&O began constructing the Metropolitan Branch west out of Washington, which was completed in 1873 after years of erratic effort. Before this line was laid, rail traffic west of Washington had to travel first to Relay or Baltimore before joining the main line. The line cut a more or less straight line from Washington to Point of Rocks, Maryland, with many grades and large bridges. Upon the opening of this line, through passenger traffic was rerouted through Washington, and the Old Main Line from Point of Rocks to Relay was reduced to secondary status as far as passenger service was concerned. The Washington to Gaithersburg section of the Met Branch was double-tracked during 1886–1893. Rebuilding in the early 20th century and complete double-tracking of the branch by 1928 increased capacity; the "branches" became the de facto mainline, though the Old Main Line was retained as a relief route.

Meanwhile, the Pennsylvania Railroad (PRR) outmaneuvered the B&O to acquire the B&O's northern connection, the Philadelphia, Wilmington and Baltimore Railroad, in the early 1880s, cutting off the B&O's access to Philadelphia and New York. The state of Maryland had stayed true to its implicit promise not to grant competing charters for the Baltimore/Washington line, but when a charter was granted in 1860 to build a line from Baltimore to Pope's Creek in southern Maryland, lawyers for the Pennsylvania RR picked up on a clause in the unfulfilled charter allowing branches up to 20 miles (32 km) long, from any point and in any direction. The projected route, passing through what is now Bowie, Maryland, could have a "branch" constructed that would allow service into Washington. The Pennsylvania picked up the charter through the agency of the Baltimore and Potomac Railroad and in 1872 service between Baltimore and Washington began. (See Pope's Creek Subdivision.) At the same time, the PRR outmaneuvered the B&O and took control of the Long Bridge across the Potomac River into Virginia, the B&O's connection to southern lines.

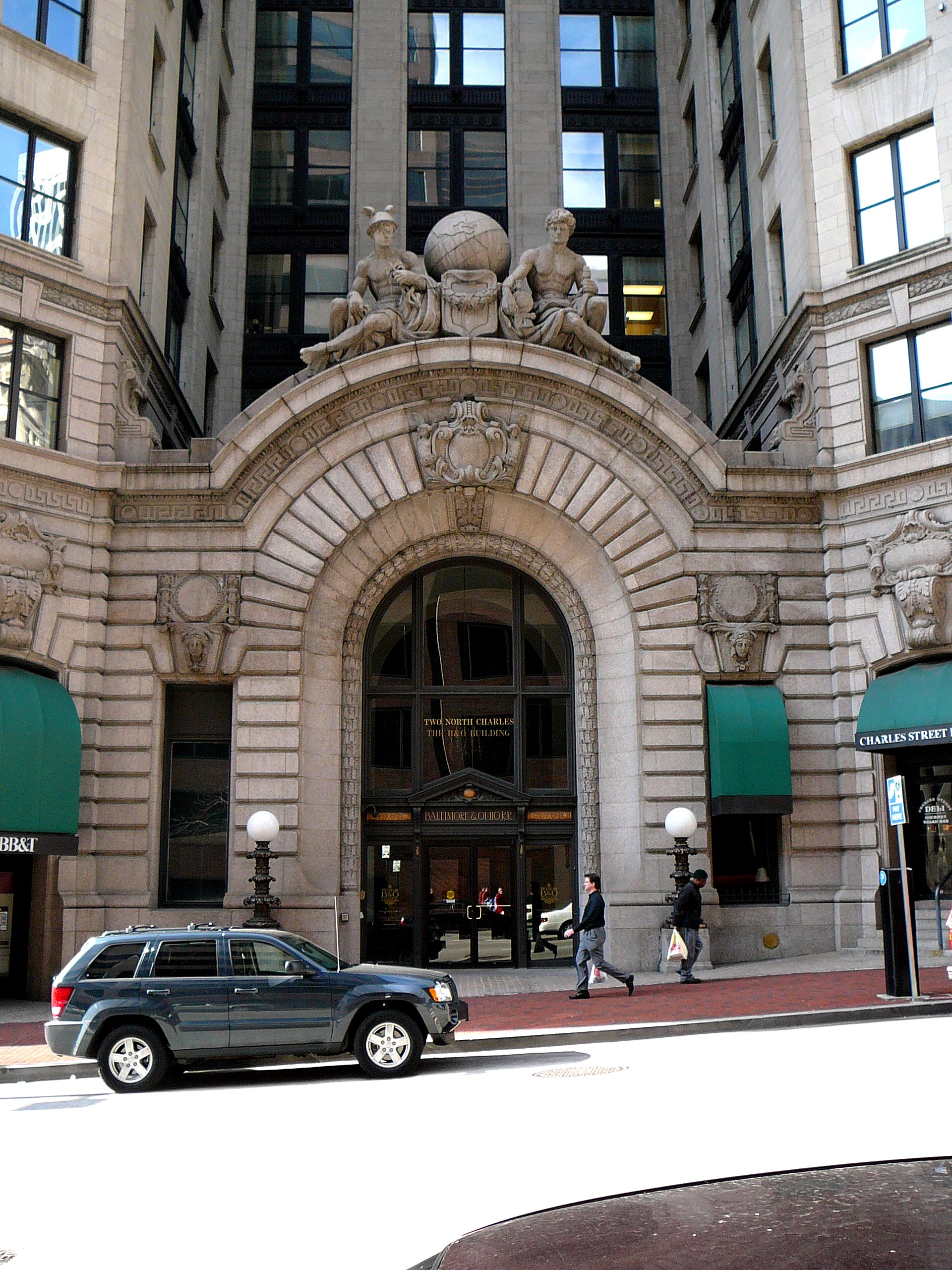
B&O headquarters building on North Charles Street in Baltimore

In response, the B&O chartered the Philadelphia Branch in Maryland and the Baltimore and Philadelphia Railroad in Delaware and Pennsylvania and built a parallel route, finished in 1886. The 10th president, Charles F. Mayer, spearheaded the development of the Baltimore Belt Line, which opened in 1895, and recruited engineer Samuel Rea to design it. This belt line connected the main line to the Philadelphia Branch without the need for a car ferry across the Patapsco River, but the cost of constructing the Howard Street Tunnel drove the B&O to bankruptcy in 1896.

Two other lines were built in attempts to reconnect to the south. The Alexandria Branch (now called the Alexandria Extension) was built in 1874, starting from Hyattsville, Maryland, and ending at a ferry operation at Shepherd's Landing. The ferry operation continued until 1901 when the trackage rights agreement concluded as part of the construction of Washington Union Station saw the south end of the branch realigned to link to the PRR trackage in Anacostia, across the Anacostia Railroad Bridge, into the Virginia Avenue Tunnel, through Southwest Washington, D.C., to Potomac Yard in Alexandria, Virginia. (See RF&P Subdivision.) The Alexandria Branch trackage to Shepherd's Landing was heavily used during World War II when traffic congestion on the Long Bridge caused the U.S. Army Corps of Engineers to construct a bridge along the original plan of the B&O: Alexandria to Shepherd's Landing, Washington. Trains of empty freight cars were routed north and south over the structure, which was demolished after the end of World War II.

Before either connection was made, however, another branch was built around the west side of Washington. During the 1880s the B&O had organised a group of bankrupt railroads in Virginia into the Virginia Midland Railroad. The VM track ran from Alexandria to Danville, Virginia. The line projected west across the Potomac River was intended to cross the Potomac just north of the D.C. line, to continue southwest to a connection with the B&O-controlled Virginia Midland (VM) in Fairfax (now Fairfax Station, to distinguish it from what was Fairfax Court House and is now the City of Fairfax, Virginia), and if possible to a connection with the Richmond, Fredericksburg and Potomac Railroad in Quantico. The branch was started in 1892 and reached Chevy Chase, Maryland, the same year. Financial problems in both the VM and B&O forced a halt to construction and led to the B&O's loss of control of the VM. Following bankruptcy, and control by the Pennsylvania Railroad, by the time the line was completed in 1910 there was no longer any point to the river crossing. Thus, the renamed Georgetown Branch came to serve a wide range of customers in Maryland and in Georgetown, such as the Potomac Electric Power Company, the Washington Milling Company, and the U.S. government. The line cut directly across various creeks, and includes what was said to be the longest wood trestle on the railroad over Rock Creek; and a short tunnel, Dalecarlia Tunnel, under the Washington Aqueduct. The line was almost completely abandoned in 1986 by CSX and is presently used in part as the right-of-way for the Capital Crescent Trail.

After a flood damaged the C&O Canal in 1877, the B&O acquired a majority interest in the canal mainly to keep its property and right of way from potential use by the Western Maryland Railroad. The canal was operated by the B&O until 1924 when it was damaged in another flood. The canal's property was later transferred to the U.S. government in 1938 in consideration for obtaining a loan from the federal Reconstruction Finance Corporation.

In 1895 the B&O introduced electric locomotives over 3.75 mi (6.04 km) of line near Camden, initially using an overhead electric slot system.

=== The 20th century ===
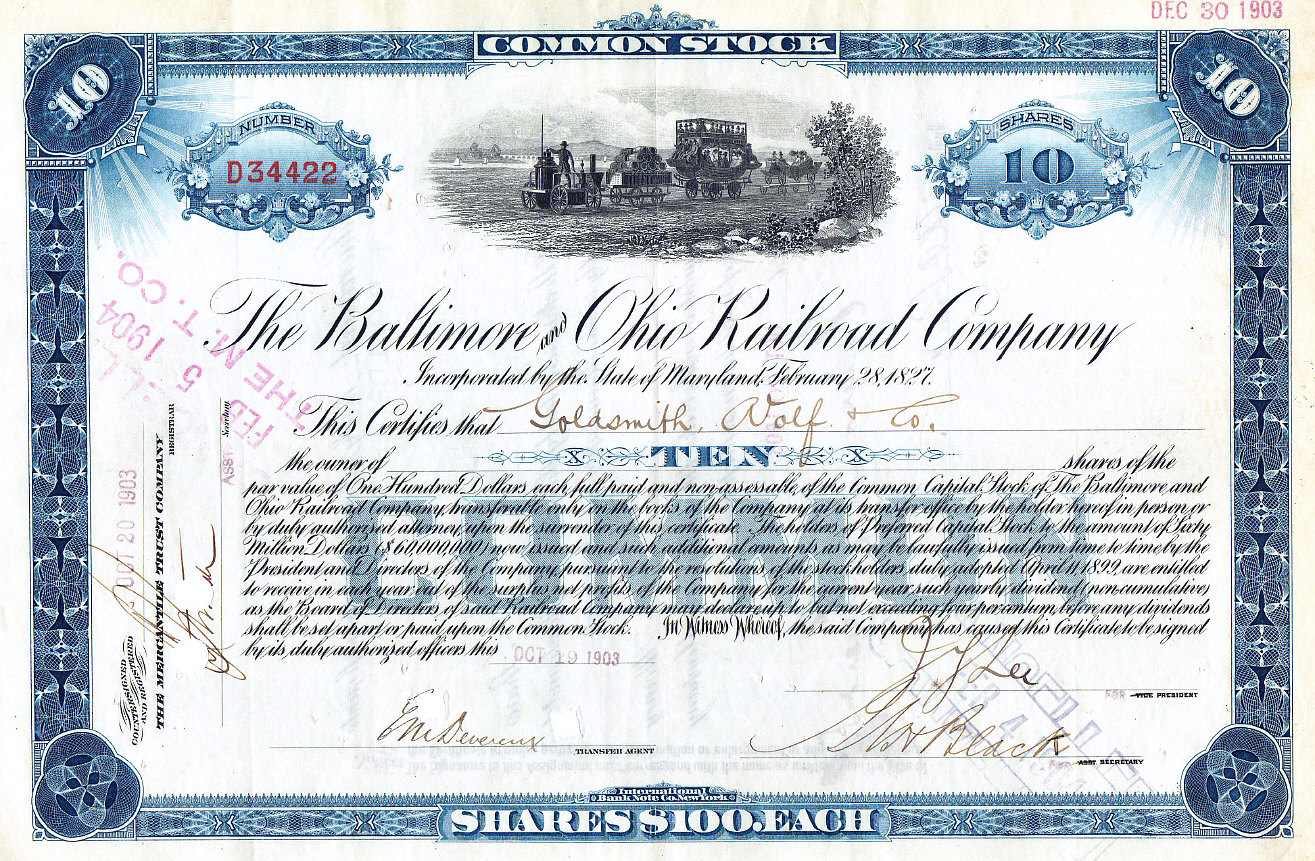
B&O stock certificate, 1903

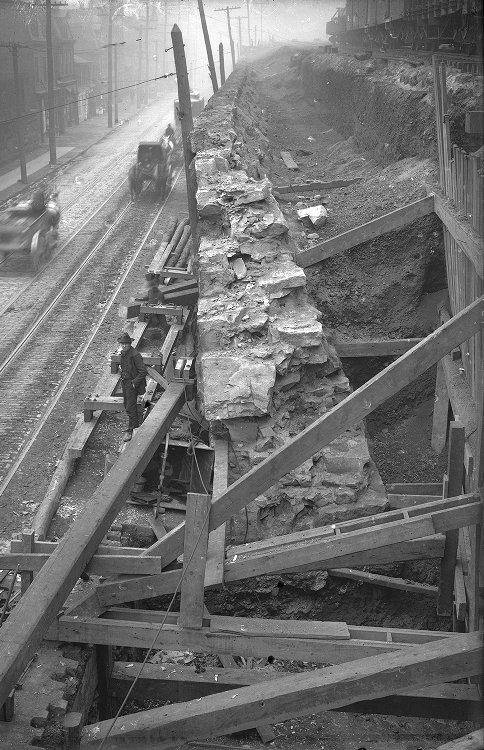
Replacement of retaining wall of B&O in Hazelwood, Pittsburgh, 1906

Following its emergence from bankruptcy, control of the B&O was acquired by the Pennsylvania Railroad in 1901, though the two kept separate corporate identities. A rising young PRR Vice President, Leonor F. Loree, was appointed president. Loree shared the Pennsy management's belief in infrastructure and the B&O at that time needed some of that. New classes of engines were built to haul longer, heavier trains faster. The Old Main Line was reworked, sections of the original right-of-way cut off by the straightening of curves and replacement of old, weight-restricted bridges with newer, heavier bridges. Most of Loree's work on the B&O physical plant remains evident today. Many iron and steel bridges on the railroad were replaced with stone (Pennsy preferred stone to the preference of the Reading and Lackawanna Railroad for concrete). With the adoption of anti-trust legislation in 1906, the relation between the two companies was severed.

The railroad's passenger numbers were at a disadvantage with the railroad's major competitor in the northeast, the Pennsylvania Railroad. That railroad had a tunnel into Manhattan, thus carrying passengers directly into New York City. The B&O had no tunnel rights, and its New York City market trains actually terminated at the Central Railroad of New Jersey Terminal in Jersey City. From Philadelphia to Jersey City the B&O traveled over Reading Railroad tracks to Bound Brook and there joining Central Railroad of New Jersey tracks to Jersey City. Passengers rode CNJ ferries or B&O busses to Manhattan. Suffering from its weaker market position from Baltimore to New York, the B&O discontinued all passenger service north of Baltimore on April 26, 1958. One day later, the railroad had declared itself fully dieselized.

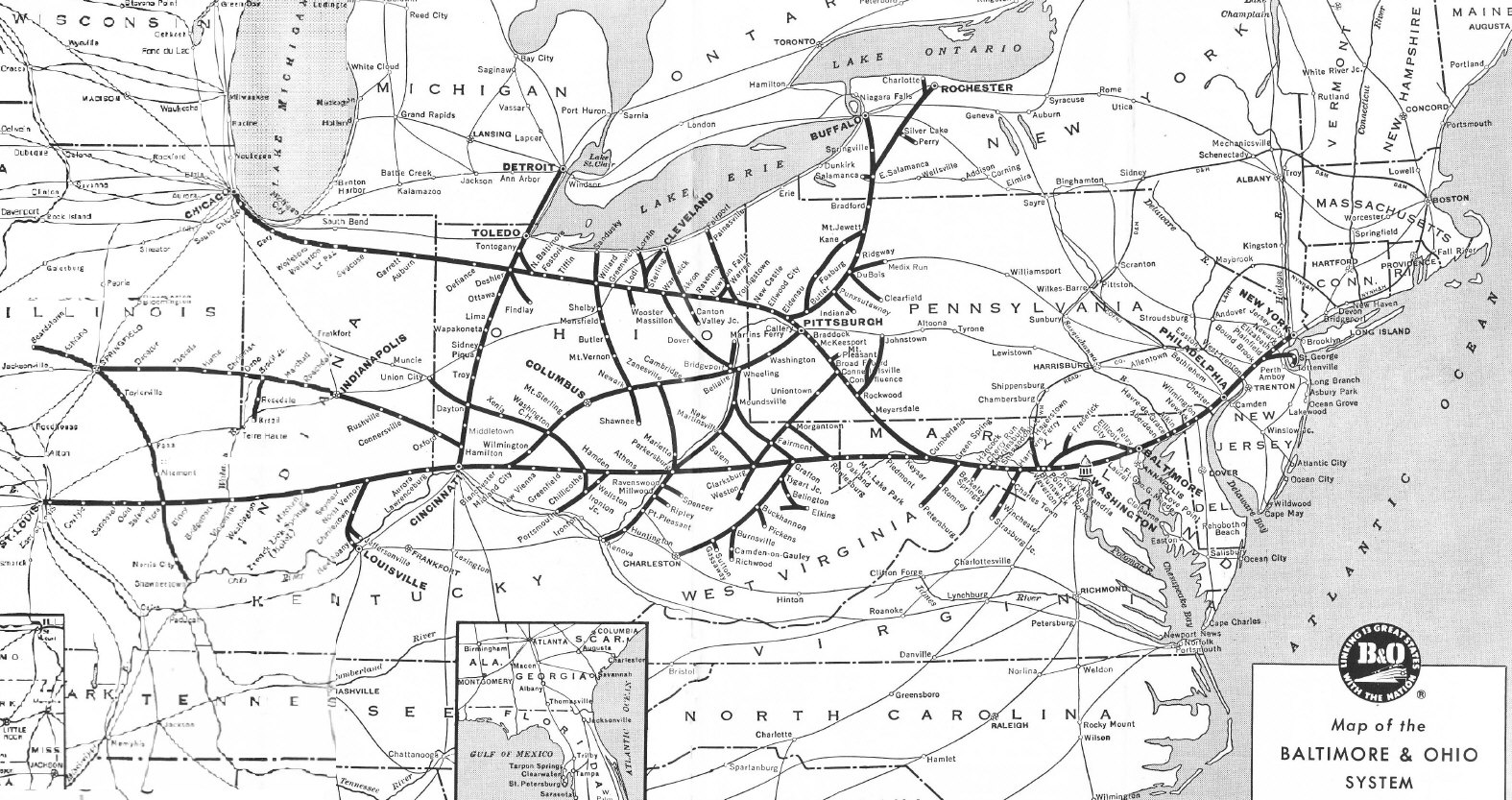
Baltimore and Ohio Railroad system map, circa 1961

The Chesapeake and Ohio Railway took financial control of the B&O in 1963. On May 1, 1971, Amtrak had taken over all of the remaining non-commuter routes of the B&O. The B&O already had a controlling interest in the Western Maryland Railway. In 1973 the three railroads were brought together under one corporate identity, the Chessie System, although they continued to operate as separate railroads. In 1980 the Chessie System and Seaboard Coast Line Industries, a holding company that owned the Seaboard Coast Line, the Louisville & Nashville, the Clinchfield, and the Georgia Railroad, agreed to form CSX Corporation. SCL Industries was renamed the Seaboard System Railroad (SBD) in 1983, the same year that the Western Maryland Railway was completely absorbed into the B&O. SBD was renamed CSX Transportation (CSX) in 1986. On April 30, 1987, the B&O's corporate existence ended when it was absorbed into the Chesapeake and Ohio Railway, which merged into CSX Transportation on August 31 of that year.

In railroading's golden age, the B&O was one of several trunk lines uniting the northeast quadrant of the United States into a wide industrial zone. It was the southern border as the New York Central was the northern border. The Pennsylvania Railroad controlled the center, and smaller roads like the Lackawanna, Lehigh Valley, and the Erie in the center surviving largely through the Interstate Commerce Commission. The corners of this map are Baltimore in the southeast, Boston in the northeast, Chicago in the northwest, and St. Louis in the southwest.

Revenue Freight Ton-Miles (Millions)
| | B&O | SIRT | BR&P | CI&W | D&U | ICV |
|---|---|---|---|---|---|---|
| 1925 | 19459 | 6 | 1585 | 376 | 3 | 15 |
| 1933 | 12111 | 6 | (incl in B&O) | (incl in B&O) | (incl in B&O) | (incl in B&O) |
| 1944 | 34802 | 9 | | | | |
| 1960 | 24840 | 15 | | | | |
| 1970 | 28594 | ? | | | | |

Revenue Passenger-Miles (Millions)
| | B&O | SIRT | BR&P | CI&W | D&U | ICV |
|---|---|---|---|---|---|---|
| 1925 | 878 | 67 | 47 | 14 | 0.004 | 0.1 |
| 1933 | 435 | 52 | (incl in B&O) | (incl in B&O) | (incl in B&O) | (incl in B&O) |
| 1944 | 2758 | 81 | | | | |
| 1960 | 533 | 37 | | | | |
| 1970 | 64 | ? | | | | |

== Named passenger trains ==
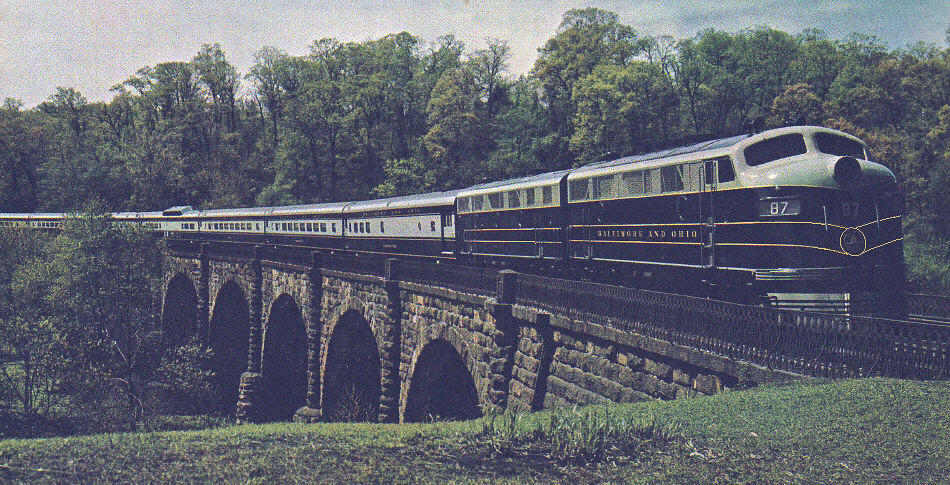
The Columbian on Thomas Viaduct, Relay, Maryland, in 1949.

The B&O's named passenger trains included:

- Abraham Lincoln (1935–77); continues today as Amtrak's Lincoln Service, connecting Chicago with St. Louis.
- Ambassador (1930–64); connected Baltimore, Washington, Pittsburgh, and Detroit.
- Blue Ridge Limited (1934–49); connected Baltimore, Washington, Pittsburgh, and Chicago.
- Capitol Limited (1923–71); connected Baltimore, Washington, Pittsburgh, and Chicago. In 1981, Amtrak's Capitol Limited resumed service on the route, albeit with a different route west of Pittsburgh.
- Chicago Night Express (1912–1956)
- Cincinnatian (1947–1971)
- Cleveland Night Express (1915–1962)
- Columbian (1931–1964)
- Daylight Speedliner (1956–1963)
- Diplomat (1930–1961, 1964–1968)
- Fort Pitt Limited
- Great Lakes Limited
- Marylander (1938–1956)
- Metropolitan Special (1919–1971)
- National Limited (1925–1971)
- New York Night Express
- Night Express (1960–1967)
- Pittsburgh 79
- Royal Blue (1935–1958)
- Shenandoah (1937–1964)
- Washington–Chicago Express (1935–1969)
- Washington Night Express
- Washington 80
- Washingtonian (1914–1956)
- West Virginian (–1964)
- West Virginia Night Express (1912–1956)
- Wheeling-Chicago Night Express

== Legacy ==
When CSX established the B&O Railroad Museum as a separate entity from the corporation, it donated some of the former B&O Mount Clare Shops in Baltimore, including the roundhouse, to the museum.

Baseball fans at the Baltimore Orioles' current home, Oriole Park at Camden Yards, see the Baltimore & Ohio Warehouse at Camden Yards over the right-field wall.

== Locomotive roster ==
The B&O acquired locomotives and cab units built by these companies:

- Electro-Motive Diesel
- Baldwin Locomotive Works
- Lima Locomotive Works
- Fairbanks-Morse

== Heritage units ==
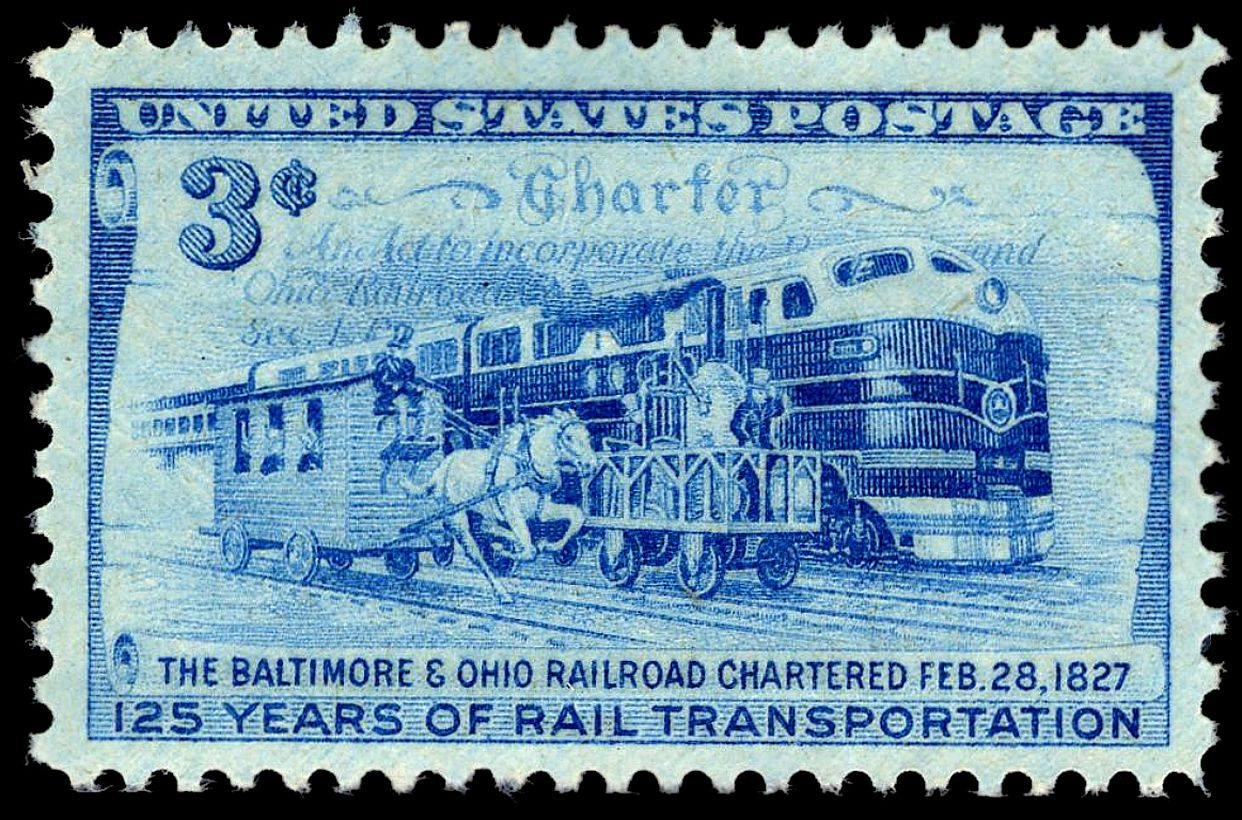
In 1952 the U.S. Post Office issued a postage stamp commemorating the 125th anniversary of the B & O Railroad.

In 2021, CSX repainted three ex Amtrak EMD F40PHs into an honorary B&O scheme: CSX 1, CSX 2 and CSX 3.

In May 2023, GE ES44AH unit #1827 entered service, being repaired and painted at CSX shops in Waycross, GA under the honorary B&O scheme similar to that of the three F40PH locomotives. It is CSX's first heritage unit.

== See also ==
- Baltimore and Ohio Railroad Martinsburg Shops, a National Historic Landmark
- Early History of the Washington Branch Line
- Baltimore Belt Line
- Aeolus Railroad Car
- Camden Station
- Mount Royal Station
- Mount Clare Shops
- Cuyahoga Valley Scenic Railroad
- Charles T. Hinde
- La Paz, a preserved coach that was operated by B&O
