= List of tunnels documented by the Historic American Engineering Record in Maryland =

This is a list of tunnels documented by the Historic American Engineering Record in the U.S. state of Maryland.

== Tunnels ==
Survey No.	Name (as assigned by HAER)	Built	Documented	Carries	Crosses	Location	County	Coordinates
MD-11	Baltimore & Ohio Railroad, Howard Street Tunnel	1895	1984	CSX Baltimore Terminal Subdivision	Howard Street	Baltimore	Independent city	39°18′17″N 76°37′15″W
MD-15	Baltimore & Ohio Railroad, Point of Rocks Tunnel		1971	CSX Old Main Line Subdivision	Catoctin Mountain	Point of Rocks	Frederick	39°16′30″N 77°32′39″W
MD-17	Baltimore & Ohio Railroad, Harpers Ferry Tunnel	1894	1970	Former Baltimore and Ohio Railroad	Elk Ridge	Maryland Heights	Washington	39°19′27″N 77°43′26″W
MD-21	Baltimore & Ohio Railroad, Ilchester Tunnel	1903	1971	Former Baltimore and Ohio Railroad		Ilchester	Howard	39°15′00″N 76°45′44″W

== See also ==
- List of bridges documented by the Historic American Engineering Record in Maryland
