= Baltimore Belt Line =

Baltimore USA railroad line

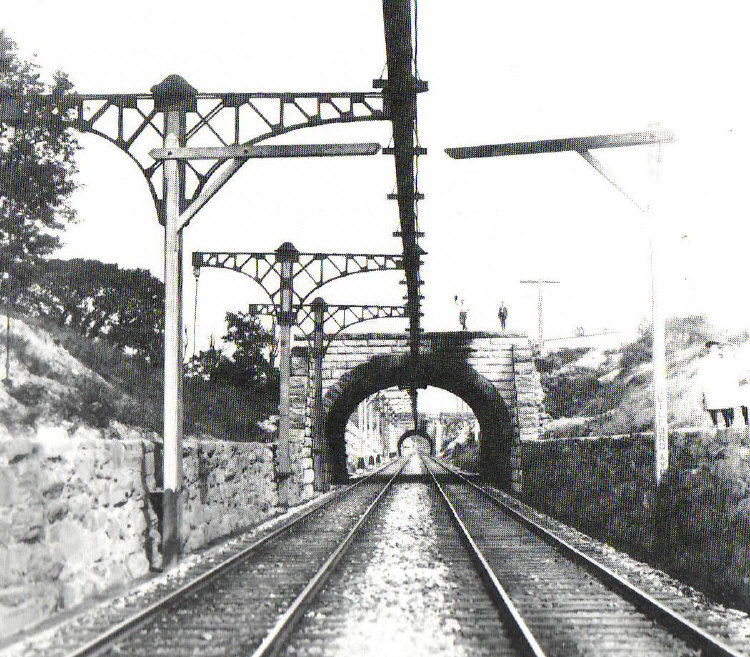
- B&O's overhead third-rail system at Guilford Avenue in Baltimore, 1901, part of the Baltimore Belt Line. The central position of the overhead conductors was dictated by the many tunnels on the line: the ∩-shaped rails were located at the highest point in the roof to give the most clearance

Overview
- Status: Operational
- Owner: Baltimore and Ohio Railroad (Original); CSX Transportation (Current)
- Locale: Baltimore, Maryland, United States

History
- Electrified via overhead rail: 1895
- Electrification removed: 1952

Technical
- Track gauge: 4 ft 8 1/2 in (1,435 mm) standard gauge
- Electrification: formerly electrified

The Baltimore Belt Line was constructed in Baltimore, Maryland, by the Baltimore and Ohio Railroad (B&O) in the early 1890s to connect the railroad to its new line to Philadelphia and Jersey City (the terminal serving New York City). It included the Howard Street Tunnel, the Mount Royal Station for B&O's Royal Blue Line passenger trains, and the first mainline railroad electrification in the United States. Today, CSX Transportation operates the line as part of its Baltimore Terminal Subdivision.

== Origins ==
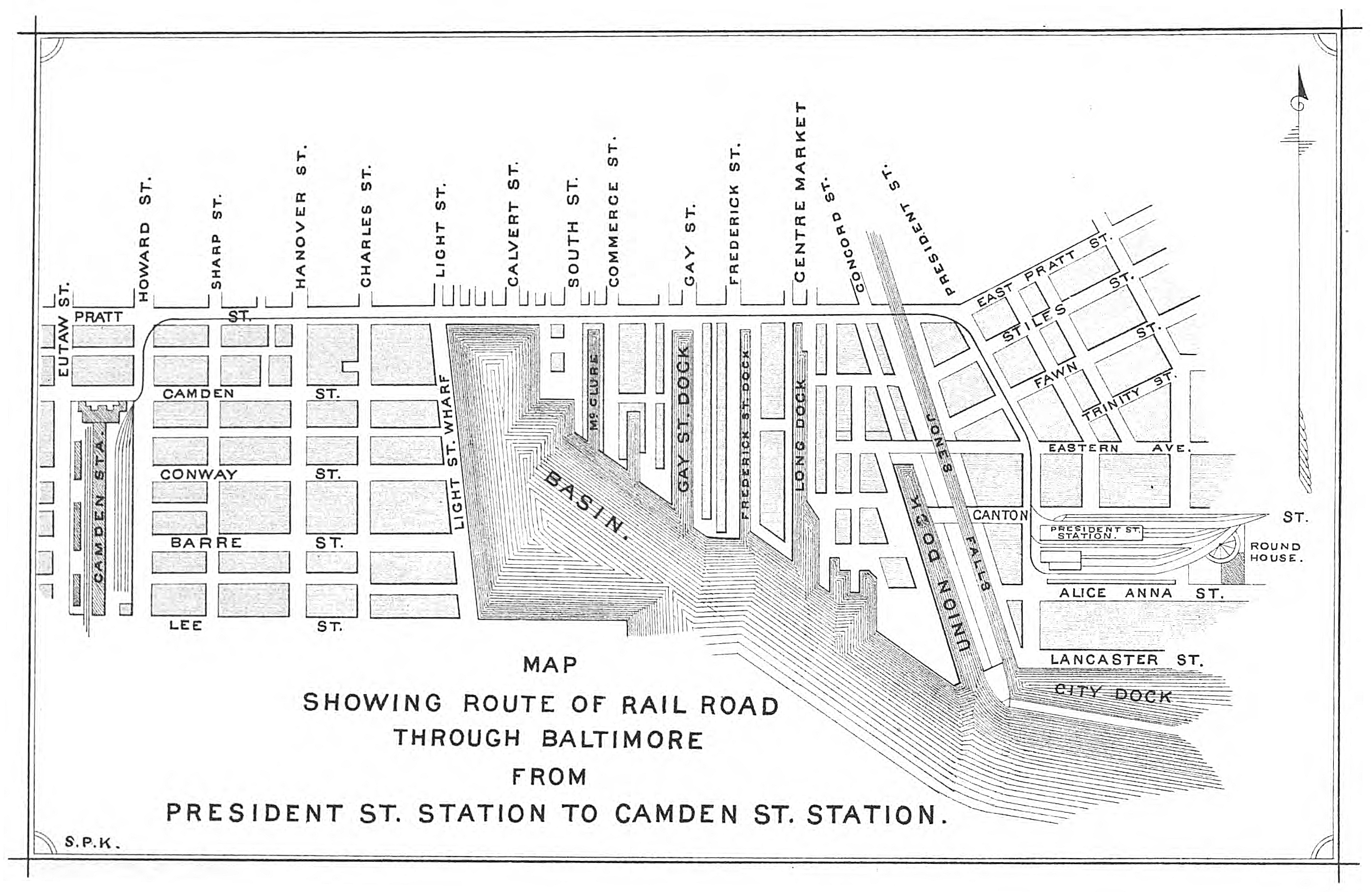
1861 map of the B&O-PW&B connection in south Baltimore, before its takeover by the Pennsylvania Railroad

From the 1830s to early 1870s, the B&O terminated in Baltimore, but offered passenger and freight service onward to New York via the Philadelphia, Wilmington and Baltimore Railroad (PW&B). The connection was unwieldy: train cars were pulled by horses on tracks laid on surface streets from the B&O station (first the Pratt Street Depot at Pratt and South Charles Streets, then after 1856, Camden Street Station) eastward along East Pratt Street past the harbor's waterfront piers to PW&B's President Street Station (built 1849–1850) at President and Fleet Streets. Horses were used because steam locomotives were forbidden to run on downtown streets by ordinances passed by the Baltimore City Council in 1831, in the more primitive years of American railroading.

In 1884, the PW&B was purchased by the Pennsylvania Railroad (PRR), which promptly severed the B&O's connection to New York. Cut off from the Atlantic seaboard's main line, the B&O needed a new way to reach the New York market. It began to build its Philadelphia Branch (formally known as the Baltimore and Philadelphia Railroad) to connect to the Philadelphia and Reading Railroad, which would connect with the Central Railroad of New Jersey for B&O's New York service across the Hudson River to Manhattan. The combination would also provide a connection to the Staten Island Railway, which served as the terminal switching company for the B&O's New York freight service across the Hudson River or Upper New York Bay to Manhattan.

But the new line, which began in eastern Baltimore, needed a connection to the downtown terminal, and so the B&O conceived the Belt Line. In 1889, Charles F. Mayer became B&O president, and recruited young railroader Samuel Rea to work on the new line as chief engineer.

== Construction ==
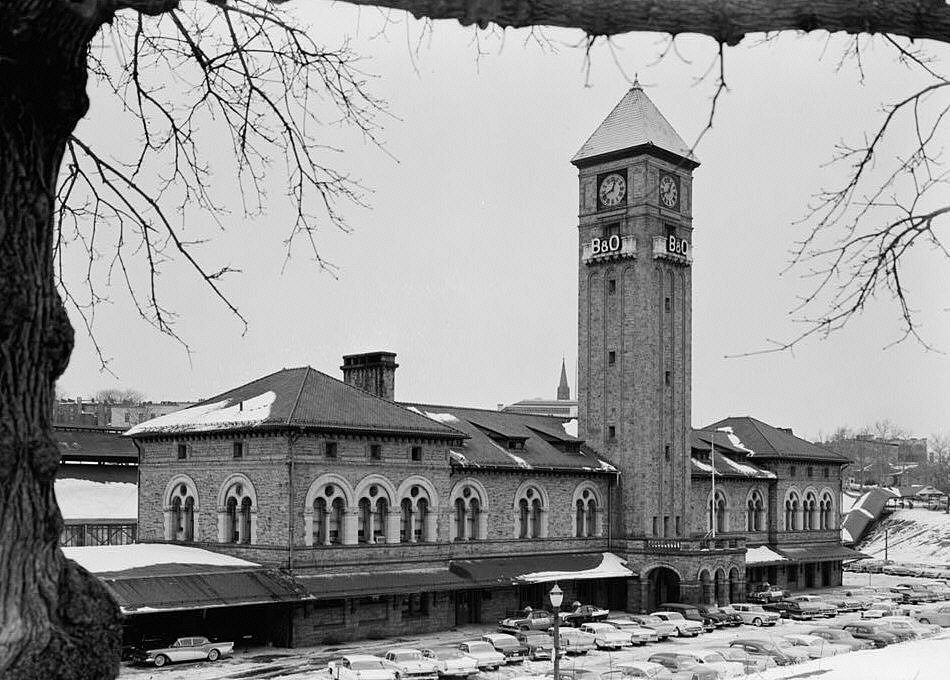
Mount Royal Station (in 1961)

Connecting the new Philadelphia Branch to the rest of the B&O system was a considerable engineering challenge. A new surface line across the center of town was politically impossible and prohibitively expensive. Building around the outskirts of town would have required massive regrading and bridging, as the terrain is extremely hilly and the line would cut across every watershed flowing into the harbor. As a temporary expedient, traffic was handled through Baltimore on carfloats across the Patapsco River / Baltimore harbor and port from Canton to Locust Point, but it was clear that a direct connection would have to be built.

The route the B&O chose started from the existing end of the track at Camden Street Station, at the west end of "The Basin" (modern Inner Harbor) of the Northwest Branch of the Patapsco River. A tunnel was constructed directly under Howard Street, heading north–south until just before it crossed the existing PRR line.

At the north portal of the tunnel, Mount Royal was constructed between 1891 and 1896. The track then curved around the northwest corner of the center city going east, passed through six other (much shorter) tunnels, continuing across the northern outskirts of downtown, curving around the Northeast corner of the old City, finally heading southeast to meet the already constructed line just north of the Canton neighborhood and connecting with the East Coast route. The cost of construction drove the Baltimore & Ohio Railroad into bankruptcy shortly after the line opened in 1895, 68 years after the line was founded in 1827 as America's first passenger / freight railroad.

Initially there were plans to build three new stations in Baltimore, but concern for interference with freight haulage and expense eventually reduced this to a single station at Mount Royal Avenue, just west by the Jones Falls stream, which opened on September 1, 1896. Lower-level platforms were added later at the east end of B&O's Camden Street Station in 1897.

=== Howard Street Tunnel ===
The Howard Street Tunnel originally ran for 1.4 miles (2.3 km) under Howard Street in downtown Baltimore. The longest tunnel on the B&O's system, it took 2,400 workers four and a half years to build (1890–1895) and cost $7 million (equivalent to more than $200 million in 2018). The tunnel is brick-lined with iron-arched centerings. At the time of completion it was considered innovative for its use of electricity for illumination and powering of locomotives. Inside the tunnel, there was an underground platform for trains serving Camden Station.

In the mid-1980s, the tunnel was extended southward by three-tenths of a mile (480 m) from its original Camden Station portal when the B&O successor CSX Transportation's mainline track east of the Baltimore & Ohio Warehouse at Camden Yards was covered over for construction of Interstate 395.

The Howard Street Tunnel is listed on the National Register of Historic Places.

== Electrification ==
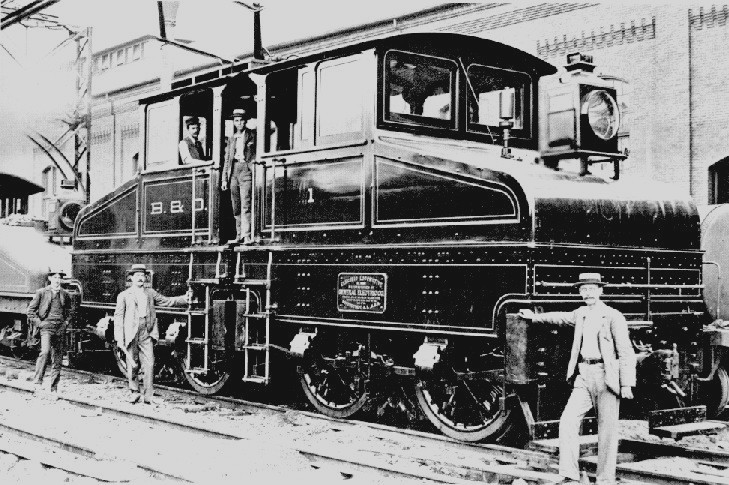
Baltimore & Ohio electric engine

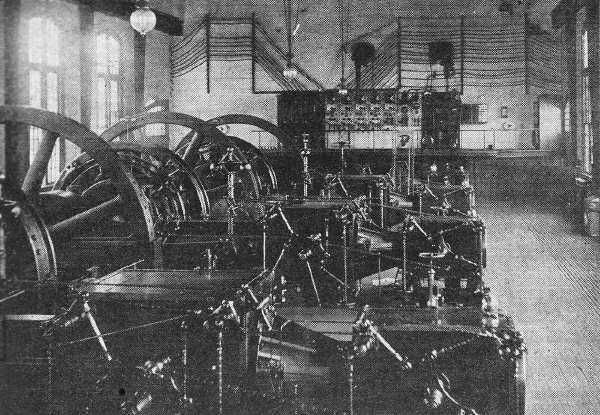
Interior of the B&O's powerhouse in 1910, supplying 675 volts DC to the Baltimore Belt Line

By this time the Pennsylvania Railroad line through Baltimore and points south had been in operation for twenty years. Due to the built-up nature of the area traversed and the hilly terrain, much of its line through town was in tunnels, which posed severe ventilation problems. Large chimneys were constructed above the Pennsylvania line, in a not entirely successful attempt to disperse the fumes from the coal-fired locomotives. However, by 1890 electric locomotion was beginning to appear possible, and in 1892 the B&O thus contracted with General Electric (GE) for electric locomotives, powerhouse equipment, and an electrical distribution system. This equipment was delivered beginning in 1895, and the first train pulled by an electric locomotive operated through the Howard Street Tunnel on June 27, 1895.

The grade on the electrified portion was downhill to Camden Station; therefore traffic heading southbound ("westbound", in B&O timetables), from Mount Royal Station, simply drifted through the tunnels. Since the engine was not working, the smoke produced was relatively light. Going upgrade northbound ("eastbound", in B&O timetables) the electric locomotives were coupled to the front of the train at Camden Station and pulled the entire train, including the steam locomotive, through the Howard Street tunnel. When northbound passenger trains stopped at Mt. Royal Station at the north end of the tunnel, the electric locomotive was uncoupled. Northbound freight trains were pulled by electric locomotives for another two miles, until reaching Huntingdon Avenue in east Baltimore. There the steam locomotive closed its cylinder cocks, took up the load, and the electric locomotive uncoupled on the fly, accelerating ahead to a pocket siding between the tracks.

General Electric installed rotary converters in B&O's powerhouse near Mt. Royal Station, having a combined capacity of 5,000 kW to convert 13,200-volt, 3 phase, 25-cycle AC to 675 volts DC. In 1936, these rotary converters were replaced by mercury arc rectifiers.

Initially power was supplied through a unique system in which a pickup shoe rode in a channel above and to one side of the track. This proved vulnerable to contamination from coal smoke, and after a short time it was replaced by a conventional third rail system. When the Howard Street track was made into a gantlet to allow higher clearances, the pickup contacts on one side were mounted on swinging arms to accommodate the varying distance to the third rail. The electrification was finally discontinued in 1952 when dieselization made it unnecessary.

== Latter-day operation ==
Throughout much of its history until the end of passenger trains in 1958, the line had relatively low passenger traffic, averaging six daily New York–Washington trains each way. Freight traffic was also limited by the scarcity of online industry east of Baltimore and B&O's lack of a connection across the Potomac River at Washington, D.C., to the southern railroads. The massive Pennsylvania main line carried most traffic to the northeast.

By the 1970s, both railroads were failing financially. The PRR had been merged into Penn Central in 1968, and two years later the new company declared bankruptcy. The B&O became part of the Chessie System in 1973, which in turn was merged into CSX in 1980.

In 1976, the PRR line became part of the new Amtrak system. The line was subsequently called the Northeast Corridor (NEC), and its role as a freight line became relatively minor. Freight traffic was further reduced on the NEC after the 1987 accident at Chase, Maryland, involving a Conrail locomotive. The Belt Line (now operated by CSX) became a key link in what became the principal rail freight line from Baltimore to Philadelphia and beyond. This segment of the CSX network is considered a chokepoint for freight train service from the Port of Baltimore to East Coast and Midwest markets. See Baltimore Terminal Subdivision.

=== Howard Street Tunnel fire ===
On July 18, 2001, a 60-car CSXT freight derailed in the Howard Street Tunnel, sparking a fire that burned for six days and blocked traffic for much longer. The Howard Street Tunnel fire called attention to the Belt Line, both as a danger to the surrounding structures and as a vulnerable chokepoint in rail traffic. CSXT has made various improvements to prevent accidents from closing the tunnel again, but is limited by the shallow depth of the bore (only three feet or 0.91 meters below the surface at the south end) and the instability of the surrounding soil.

=== Retaining wall collapse ===
On April 30, 2014, a block-long portion of a retaining wall in a below-grade stretch of the Belt Line in southern Charles Village collapsed after a heavy rainstorm, sending part of East 26th Street and a number of cars onto the tracks. No one was injured but the tracks were blocked by debris, shutting down railroad operations as well as the city block directly above them. On May 2, 2014, freight trains once again began running through the tunnels along this stretch of the Baltimore Belt Line. East 26th Street was reopened to vehicular traffic a year later.

=== Howard Street Tunnel clearance improvements ===
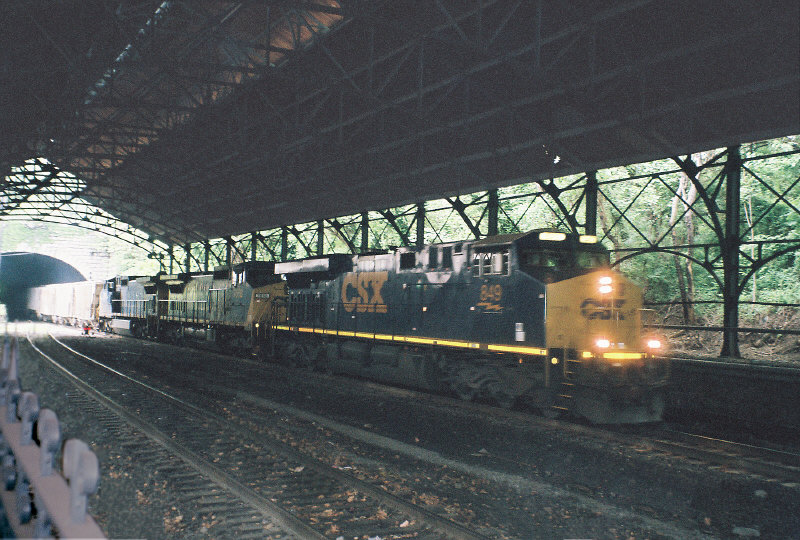
CSX freight train emerging from the north end of the Howard St. tunnel

The tunnel's roof was 1.5 ft (0.46 m) too short to accommodate double-stacked intermodal containers. The cost to excavate the floor of the tunnel was estimated to range from $1 billion to 3 billion.

In April 2016, a $425 million plan was advanced to create the clearance by trimming and notching the tunnel's arched ceiling, lowering its floor, and using steel crossties, which have a lower profile than wood crossties. The Maryland Department of Transportation subsequently applied for a $155 million FY2016 FASTLANE grant to help fund a project based on this lower-cost plan, but the grant was not received. In December 2016, MDOT reapplied for a FASTLANE grant of the same amount in the FY2017 round of funding. In addition to the federal funds expected from the grant, the state of Maryland would contribute $145 million, and CSX $125 million In expectation of the grant funding, CSX is investing $25 million in the tunnel – $21 million to improve its water discharge system, and $4 million for engineering and design of the clearance improvements. The work would also increase the clearance at nine bridges north of the tunnel. The whole project would last 4 to 5 years because work would be scheduled around active rail traffic, create about 500 construction jobs, and would result in 178,000 containers per year being moved by rail from the Port of Baltimore instead of by truck. Maryland Governor Larry Hogan said that the state would explore other funding solutions if the FY2017 FASTLANE grant was not received. On July 22, 2019, U.S. Transportation Secretary Elaine Chao announced the award of $125 million in federal infrastructure funding for the project. In early 2025, the tunnel was closed to freight traffic for 7 months. During the renovations, the track was lowered 3 feet to create the clearance needed for double-stacked intermodal containers. Fay Construction is often credited with completing some of the work but Skanska USA Civil provided the bulk of manpower and overhead which resulted in the tunnel reopening on September 26, 2025.

== See also ==
- Railroad electrification in the United States
- List of tunnels documented by the Historic American Engineering Record in Maryland
