= Howard Street Tunnel fire =

2001 freight train derailment in Baltimore, Maryland, US

Details
- Date: July 18, 2001; 25 years ago
- Location: Baltimore, Maryland
- Coordinates: 39.2877°N 76.6193°W
- Country: United States
- Line: Baltimore Terminal Subdivision
- Operator: CSX Transportation
- Incident type: Derailment

Statistics
- Trains: 1
- Deaths: 0
- Injured: 5 (minor)

The Howard Street Tunnel fire began on July 18, 2001, in a railroad tunnel under Howard Street in Baltimore, Maryland. The derailment of a 60-car CSX Transportation freight train in the Howard Street Tunnel sparked a chemical fire that raged for more than five days. The fire slowed Internet service in the US for a few hours; ruptured a water main, flooding the streets above; virtually shut down downtown Baltimore for several days; and disrupted East Coast rail service for several weeks.

== The derailment and fire ==
Around 3 p.m. on July 18, 2001, an eastbound 60-car train operated by CSX was moving through the Howard Street Tunnel, a 1.7-mile (2.7 km) tunnel under downtown Baltimore.

The 45th and 46th cars separated, and cars 46 through 56 derailed at 3:08 p.m. The 52nd car, a tank car loaded with tripropylene, ruptured and the liquid chemical caught fire, which spread to adjacent cars carrying paper, pulpwood, and plywood. Another tank car ruptured, eventually releasing 2,554 US gallons (9,670 L) of hydrochloric acid.

The train's emergency brakes came on when the cars separated, but the crew didn't realize that a derailment had taken place. Around 3:26, they moved the locomotives out of the tunnel.

Around 4 p.m., smoke was seen coming from a sewer near the intersection of Howard and Lombard Streets, and the fire department was notified. Smoke later emerged from the ends of the tunnel and from several manholes. Around 6:15 a 40-inch cast iron water main above the tunnel burst due to deformation, eventually releasing about 14 million U.S. gallons (53 million liters) of water. The fire burned for about five days.

A three-year investigation by the National Transportation Safety Board was unable to find the cause of the accident.

The National Institute of Standards and Technology calculated that temperatures within the tunnel reached about 1,800 °F (980 °C) within the flaming regions, and an average of about 900 °F (482 °C) along three to four rail car lengths. The peak wall surface temperature reached about 1,500 °F (820 °C) where the flames were directly impinging, and on average 750 °F (399 °C) over the length of three to four rail cars.

Firefighting efforts could not begin until the location of the fire within the tunnel could be found, which occurred at 5 a.m. on July 19.

As crews worked to repair the water main, firefighters found a manhole cover on Howard Street through which they could gain access to the broken water main and the tunnel itself, and firefighting efforts began in earnest.

Three rail cars (boxcars of paper and plywood) were removed from the tunnel and their flaming contents were extinguished the morning of July 22. The water main break was stopped on the same day. Tunnel inspectors determined that there was no significant structural damage, and the tunnel was reopened to traffic at 7:45 a.m. on July 23.

== Effects ==
=== Baltimore ===
The derailment and subsequent fire and flooding closed streets and businesses in much of downtown Baltimore for several days.

The fire and burst water main damaged power cables and left 1,200 Baltimore buildings without electricity.

It severed WorldCom fiber-optic cables through the tunnel, slowing regional, national, and transatlantic internet traffic until WorldCom installed a bypass 36 hours later.

The flooding at the intersection of Howard and Lombard Streets, one of the busiest in the city, closed both of those streets and 14 other cross streets for five days. It also led to extremely heavy congestion on local roads, including the I-395 spur into Baltimore. Thousands of Baltimore workers were unable to reach their jobs.

By July 24, 2001, all but the blocks immediately surrounding the water main break were reopened to automotive traffic. A two-block stretch of Howard Street remained closed until September 5.

The Inner Harbor was closed to boat traffic.

The Maryland Transit Administration shut down Central Light Rail Line service through the city for more than seven weeks, with shuttle buses running between the North Avenue and Patapsco stations, and later between North Avenue and Camden.

MARC Train service was disrupted for several days as well. Bus routes were set up by the city to ferry passengers to and from the BWI Amtrak/MARC station as an alternate route. MARC service was restored on July 23, 2001.

MTA rerouted 23 bus lines that traversed Howard Street.

Smoke from the incident and flooding forced the postponement of three Baltimore Orioles baseball games at Oriole Park at Camden Yards, which cost the team $5 million.

Three weeks later, manhole covers flew into the air as underground explosions along West Pratt Street occurred due to residual explosive chemicals from the fire in the sewers.

=== East Coast rail traffic ===
The Howard Street Tunnel is part of the CSX railroad's Baltimore Terminal Subdivision, the only direct freight-rail line between Philadelphia to Washington, D.C. (The only other direct rail link is the Amtrak Northeast Corridor, a passenger line with only limited freight operations performed by Norfolk Southern Railway.)

Officials had long known that a fire or other disaster in the Howard Street Tunnel could have disastrous consequences. In 1985, a federal transportation safety official said that "the problem would be getting in there to fight the fire...If you had an explosion, fire would shoot out of both ends like a bazooka."

Still, freight traffic on the line continued to increase as CSX and Conrail diverted traffic from Amtrak lines to avoid Amtrak/Conrail crashes like the one in Chase, Maryland in 1987. Estimates from railway publications put the freight traffic through the Howard Street Tunnel at 28 to 32 trains per day.

In its November 2005 report to Congress, the Federal Railroad Administration wrote:

To avoid the Howard Street Tunnel, CSXT had to send freight trains west to Cleveland, north to Albany, New York, and then south to Baltimore, incurring a three- to four-day delay. Some CSXT trains were rerouted via the busy NS line through Manassas, Virginia, Hagerstown, Maryland, and Harrisburg, Pennsylvania. At one point during the fire, eight CSXT trains that would have used the tunnel were detouring through Cumberland, Maryland, and Youngstown Ohio; five through Hagerstown and Harrisburg; five through Cleveland and Albany, New York; and 12 trains were stopping in various yards.

== See also ==
- Summit Tunnel fire: a UK freight train derailed and caught fire in a tunnel
- List of rail accidents (2000–2009)
