= EMC EA/EB =

American passenger cab diesel locomotive

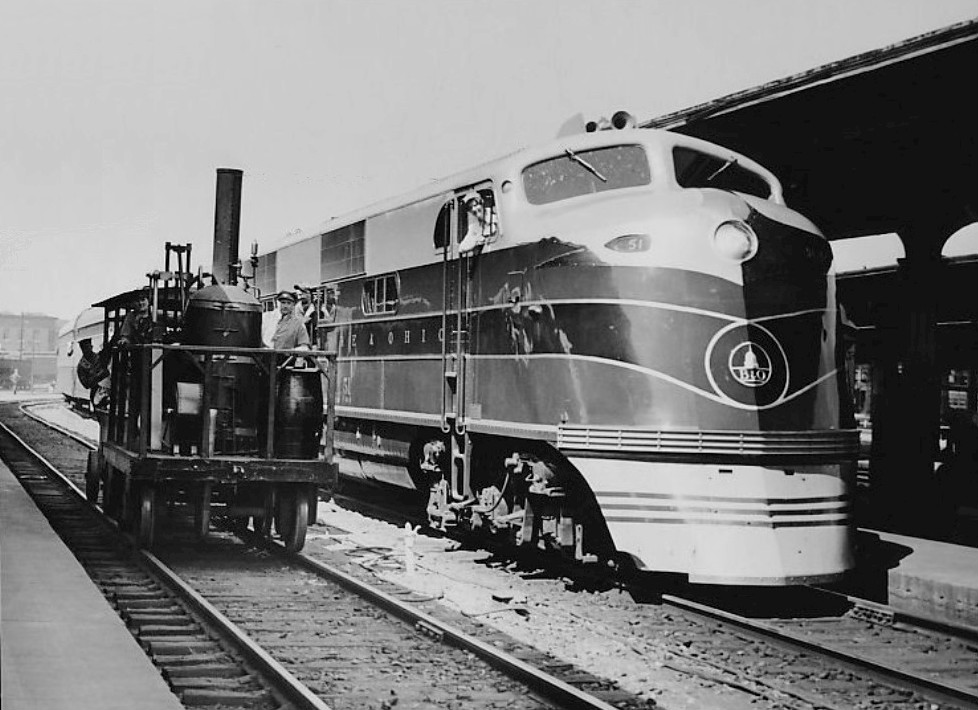
- B&O EA 51 on the Capitol Limited sitting next to the Tom Thumb locomotive replica, in 1937.
Type and origin
- Power type: Diesel-electric
- Builder: Electro-Motive Corporation (EMC)
- Serial number: 666 (51) 667 (51X) 668 (52) 669 (52X) 765-766 (53 & 54) 767 (55) 768-769 (53X & 54X) 770 (55X) 800 (56) 801 (56X)
- Build date: May 16th, 1937–June 1938
- Total produced: 6 A units, 6 B units
Specifications
- Configuration
  - AAR: A1A-A1A
- Gauge: 4 ft 8 1/2 in (1,435 mm)
- Length: 21.06 m (69.1 ft)
- Axle load: 25.5 t
- Fuel type: Diesel
- Prime mover: Winton 201-A, twinned
- Engine type: 60 degree V
- Cylinders: 12 x 2
- Transmission: Diesel-electric
- Loco brake: Westinghouse
- Train brakes: Westinghouse
Performance figures
- Maximum speed: 68–99.4 mph (109.4–160.0 km/h)
- Power output: 1,800 hp (1,300 kW)
- Tractive effort: 251.3 kN (56,500 lbf)
Career
- Operators: Baltimore and Ohio Railroad, Alton Railroad, Gulf, Mobile and Ohio
- Numbers: 51–56 (A units), 51X–56X (B units)
- Preserved: B&O #51
- Disposition: One A unit preserved, remaining units scrapped

The EMC EA/EB is an early passenger train-hauling diesel locomotive built from May 16, 1937, to 1938 by Electro-Motive Corporation of La Grange, Illinois for the Baltimore and Ohio Railroad. They were the first model in a long line of passenger diesels of similar design known as EMD E-units. Each locomotive unit developed 1,800 horsepower (1,300 kW) from two 900 hp (670 kW) Winton 201-A diesel engines, driving the wheels through an electric transmission—the generator driven by each engine provided current for traction motors. The locomotives were of A1A-A1A wheel arrangement—two three-axle trucks of which only the outer two axles were powered. Six two-unit 3,600 hp (2,700 kW) locomotives were produced, each consisting of a lead cab-equipped EA A unit and a cabless booster EB B unit. They were numbered 51 through 56; the A units bore the bare number and the B units the number followed by 'X'.

== Trains hauled ==
The six locomotives hauled some of the major named trains of the B&O; the Royal Blue, the Capitol Limited, the National Limited, and others. These trains were streamliners in appearance, but they were built largely of refurbished heavyweight passenger cars rebuilt with smooth sides, smooth rooflines, air conditioning, new interiors and modern appointments.

B&O 52 was sold to the Alton Railroad in 1940. This locomotive became a Gulf, Mobile and Ohio Railroad unit in 1947.

== Significance and influence ==
The EA/EB—along with the more-or-less simultaneous E1 for the Atchison, Topeka and Santa Fe Railway and the E2 for the Union Pacific Railroad, Chicago and North Western Railway and Southern Pacific Railroad—represented an important step in the evolution of the passenger diesel locomotive. While the EA, E1 and E2 were each built for a specific railroad, they were largely identical mechanically and were a step further away from the custom-built, integrated streamliner and towards mass-produced passenger locomotives—a step achieved with the E3 and E6, EMD's later models.

== Rebuild history ==
The pioneering Winton 201-A V12 engines used in early streamliners like the B&O Railroad Museum’s EMC EA No. 51 suffered from chronic piston, ring, and cylinder liner wear. Rather than a strict chronological rebuild frequency, mechanical crews performed constant component repairs and part replacements as maintenance inspections dictated. In the early 1950s, rather than continuing frequent major rebuilds of the temperamental Winton power plants, the B&O sent their EA/EB units back to Electro-Motive Division (EMD) to swap out the original engines for modern, more reliable EMD 567 diesels.

== Styling ==
The EA/EB and E1 featured largely identical and innovative styling showing the influence of the Electro-Motive Corporation's new buyer General Motors. While mechanically they had much in common with previous, experimental EMC locomotives, GM understood the importance of looking new and exciting, not merely being technically innovative. This basic "slant nose" style was continued in the subsequent E3, E4, E5 and E6 models, while a more "bulldog nose" style was tried in the E2 and a style somewhere in between was used for the E7, E8 and E9, as well as the EMD F-Units.

Its initial design was protected under US Patent D106,918.

== Preservation ==
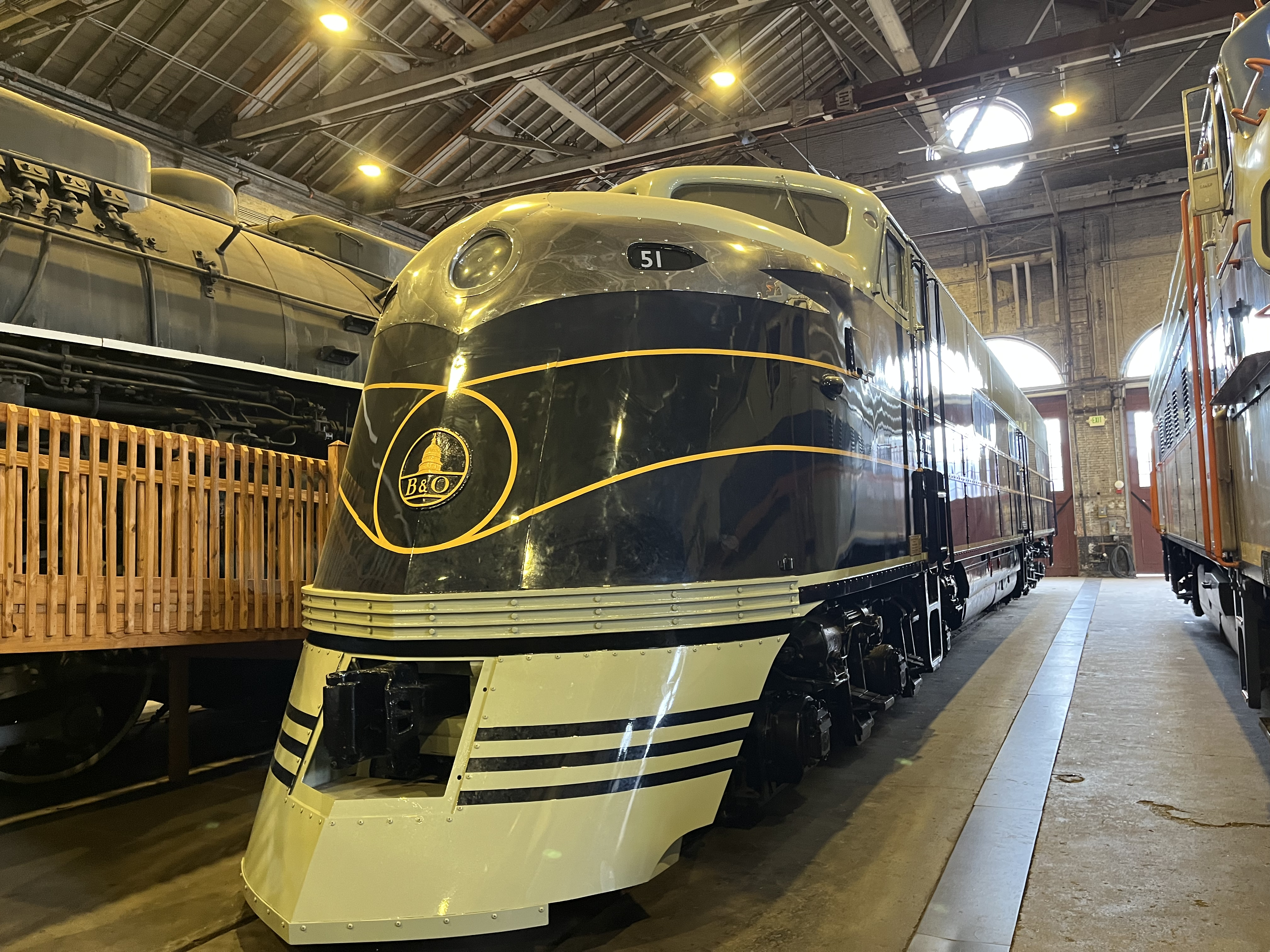
Baltimore and Ohio 51 at the Baltimore and Ohio Railroad Museum.

B&O #51, the first EA built, has been preserved at the Baltimore and Ohio Railroad Museum in Baltimore, Maryland. The EA has completed cosmetic restoration and is now on exhibit.
