= Baltimore Terminal Subdivision =

Railroad line owned by CSX in Maryland

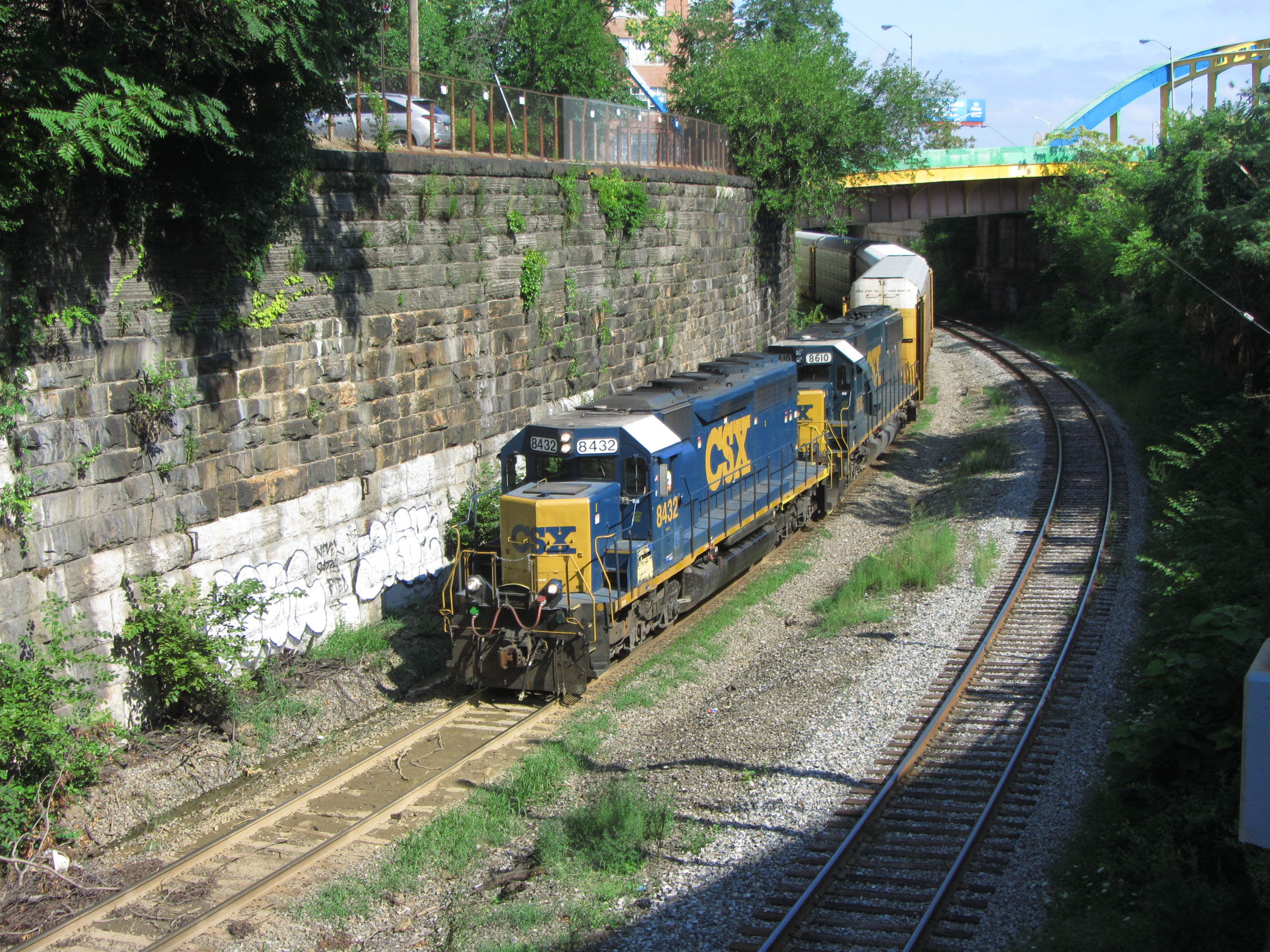
CSX autorack train on the Baltimore Terminal Subdivision in Baltimore

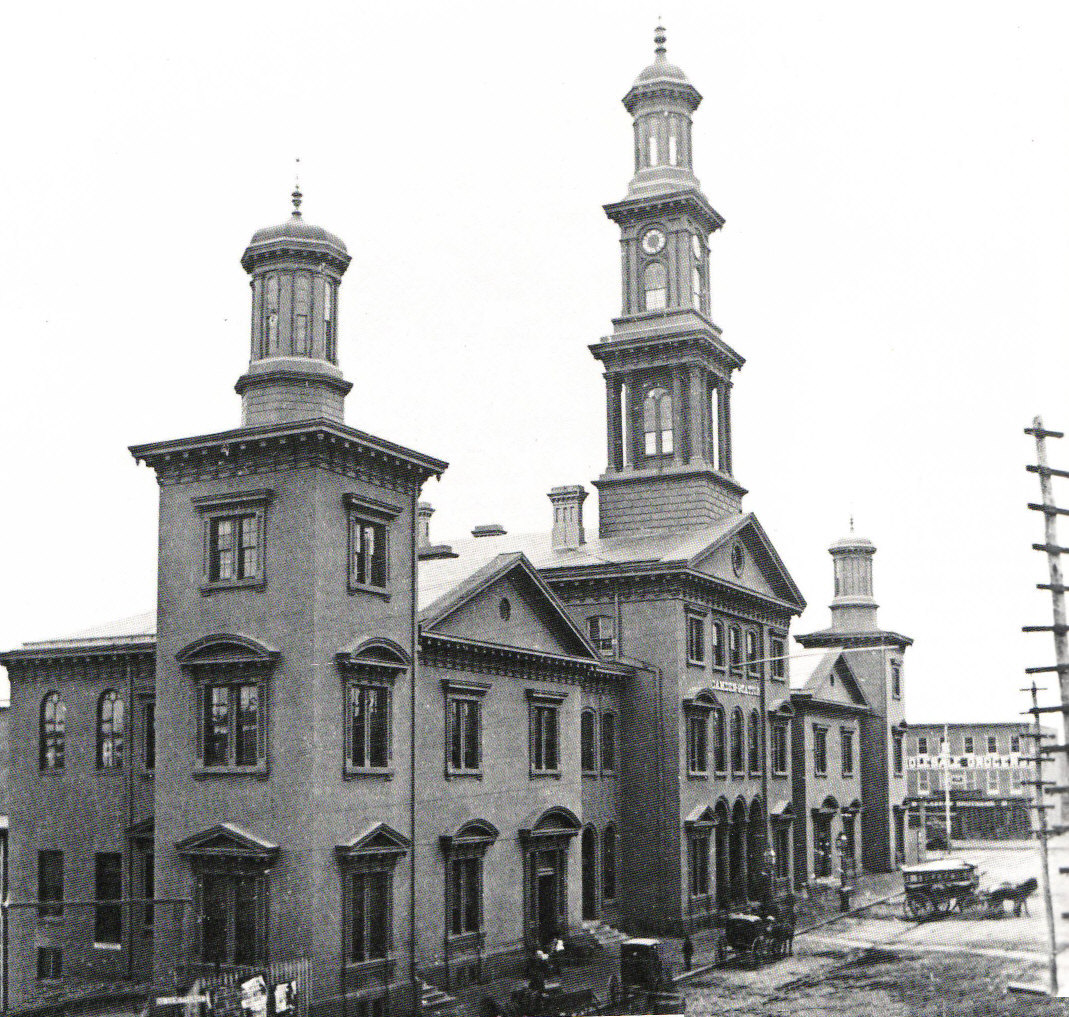
Camden Station in 1865

The Baltimore Terminal Subdivision is a railroad line owned and operated by CSX Transportation in the U.S. state of Maryland. The line runs from Baltimore to Halethorpe along the original Baltimore and Ohio Railroad (B&O) line, one of the oldest rail lines in the United States and the first passenger railroad line. At its east (north) end, it connects with the Philadelphia Subdivision; its west (south) end has a junction with the Capital Subdivision and the Old Main Line Subdivision.

== History ==
=== Mount Clare to points south and west ===
The B&O began construction in 1828. The original terminal was located in Baltimore at Pratt and Poppleton Streets. This location, initially a temporary wooden shed, became known as the Mount Clare Station. The Mount Clare Shops, the first railroad manufacturing facility in the U.S., was also built in this area. The rail line exited the city in a southwesterly direction. The company encountered varied terrain that required several large cut and fill earthmoving operations. The B&O built the Carrollton Viaduct, the first stone masonry bridge built for a U.S. railroad, during this project. The company provided an inaugural ride on the line from Pratt Street to the viaduct on New Year's Day 1830. The bridge, a National Historic Landmark, is still used by CSX today. (Note: The Carrollton Viaduct is located on the present-day Mount Clare Branch, about 1 mile (1.6 km) south of the Carroll junction on the main line. The B&O rebuilt the main line tracks in the 1870s.) Construction of the tracks continued southward to the Patapsco River near Halethorpe, and then turned west following the river. Today Halethorpe is the southern terminus of the Baltimore Terminal Subdivision.

The railroad offered the first regular passenger train service in the U.S. in May 1830, from Baltimore to Ellicott's Mills (now called Ellicott City) along the Patapsco. The first permanent train station, the Ellicott City Station, was completed in 1831.

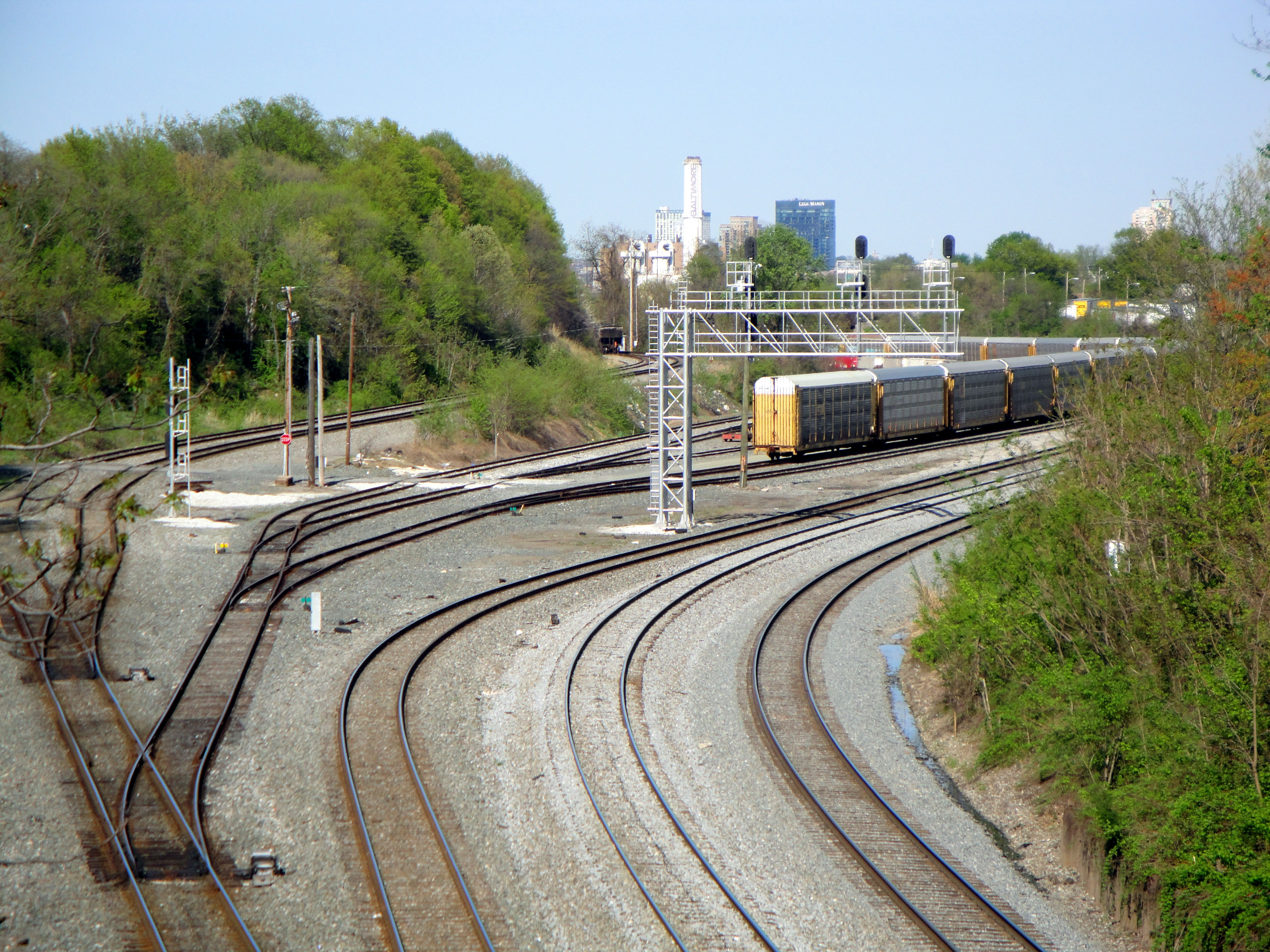
Mount Winans Yard. The set of three tracks on the right is the current CSX main line. The pair of tracks on the extreme left is the Mount Clare Branch, part of the original B&O main line, leading to the Carrollton Viaduct.

Also in 1831, the B&O built a junction, known as Relay, just north of the river near Halethorpe and began construction of the Washington Branch south toward Washington, D.C. (This branch was later named the Capital Subdivision.) The section of the line proceeding west from Relay, along the Patapsco, eventually became known as the Old Main Line.

The B&O built a branch line to Locust Point, on the Baltimore harbor, during 1848–49. The branch had a rail yard and terminal that was used for shipping coal and bulk minerals, and later for grain and merchandise. A permanent station at Mount Clare was completed c. 1851. The railroad opened the larger Camden Station nearby in 1857, and expanded it in 1865. In 1875 new roundhouses were built at Bailey's (Ostend Street, near the site of the present-day M&T Bank Stadium) and Riverside Yard on Locust Point. Another branch line and a larger shipping terminal at Curtis Bay was opened in 1884. Subsequently, all coal traffic was routed to the new terminal. The B&O built two larger roundhouses at Riverside in 1907 (totaling 50 stalls) and no longer used the Bailey's facilities for locomotive operations.

=== Baltimore to Philadelphia ===
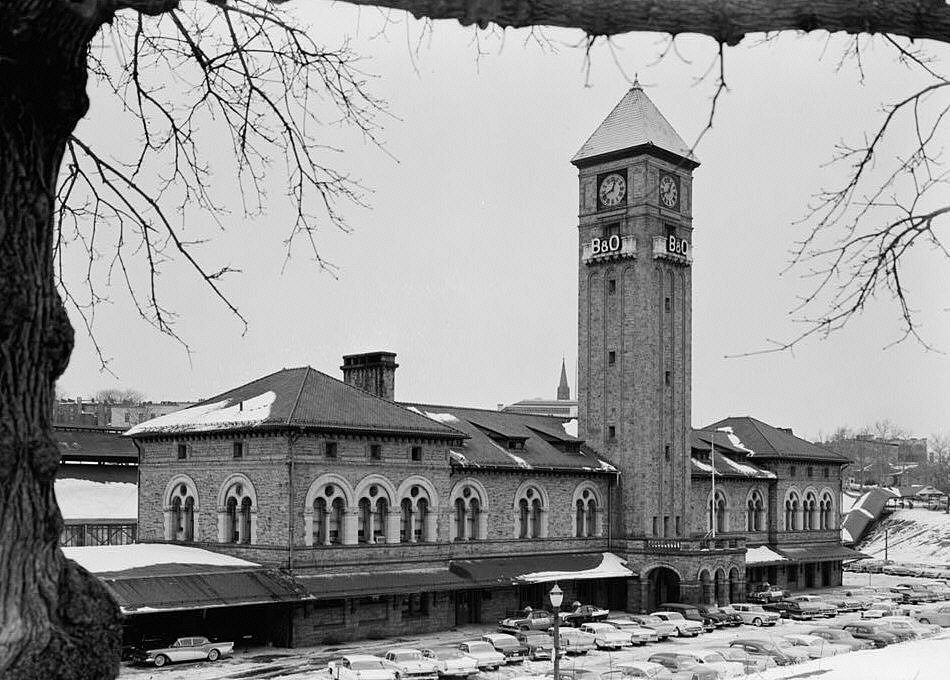
Mount Royal Station in 1961

The B&O's initial route from Baltimore to Philadelphia was on the Philadelphia, Wilmington and Baltimore Railroad. The B&O operated a car float across the Baltimore harbor to bring trains from Philadelphia to connections at Locust Point and to the south and west. By the early 1880s this line was controlled by the Pennsylvania Railroad, which proceeded to deny access to the B&O. The B&O then built the Philadelphia Branch (known formally as the Baltimore and Philadelphia Railroad). To move trains more efficiently around the city it also built the Baltimore Belt Line and the Howard Street Tunnel during 1891 to 1895, at considerable expense. The car float operation was shut down after the new facilities opened.

The Mount Royal Station, along the Belt Line, opened in 1896. This became the second of two Baltimore stops for the Royal Blue passenger train, which began service in 1890 between Washington and New York City. (The other stop was Camden Station.) Passenger traffic declined significantly after World War II and the B&O closed the Mount Royal station in 1961.

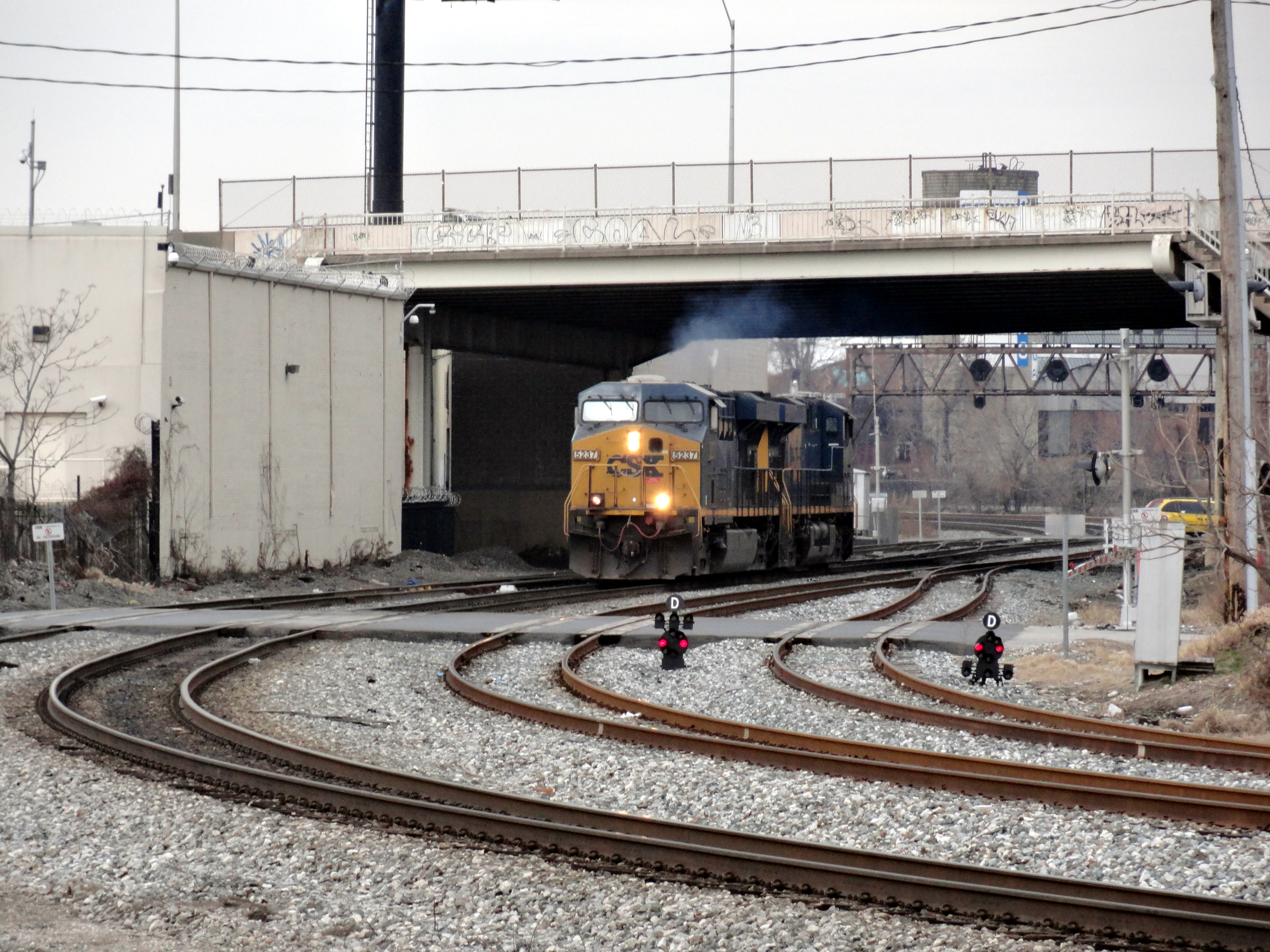
Locomotives entering Baileys Wye, heading north to the Howard Street Tunnel.

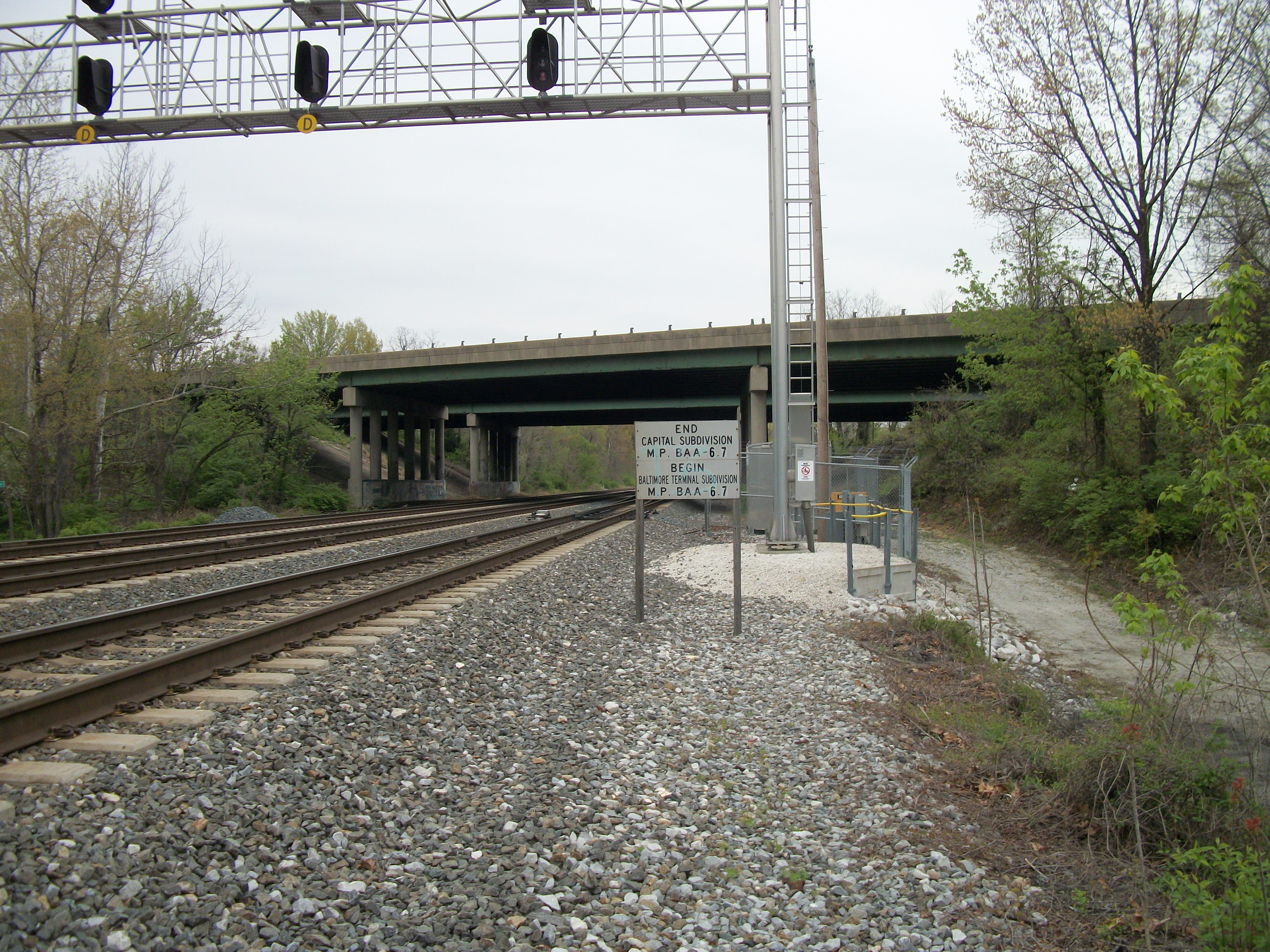
The southern terminus of the Baltimore Terminal Subdivision at the northern terminus of the Capital Subdivision, in St. Denis, Maryland.

The junction of the Philadelphia Branch and the Belt Line, in east Baltimore, is the northern terminus of the Baltimore Terminal Subdivision.

=== CSX acquisition ===
CSX completed formal acquisition of the B&O in 1987.

== Current operations ==
The Baltimore Terminal Subdivision continues to support both freight and passenger train operations.

Local commuter passenger trains are operated on the line by the state-run MARC Train service. The MARC Camden Line operates between Camden Station and Washington's Union Station.

== See also ==
- Howard Street Tunnel fire (2001)
- List of CSX Transportation lines
