= Mount Royal Station (Maryland Institute College of Art) =

University building and historical passenger rail station in Baltimore

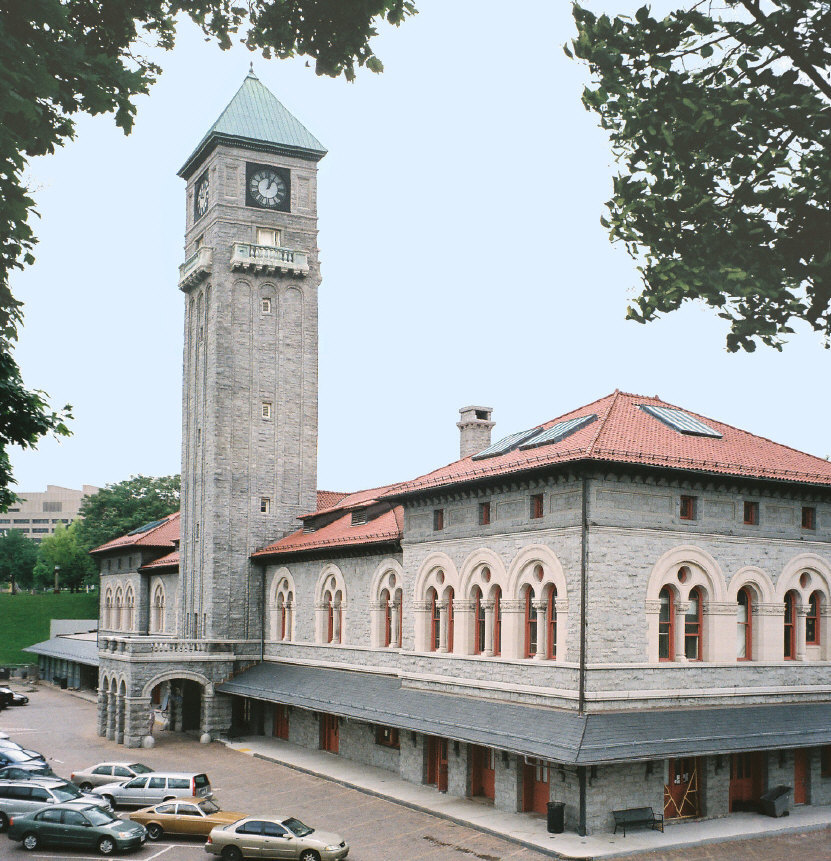
- Mount Royal Station in 2009
- Alternative names: Mount Royal Station and Trainshed

General information
- Architectural style: Renaissance
- Location: 1400 Cathedral Street, Baltimore, Maryland
- Coordinates: 39°18′20″N 76°37′14″W
- Completed: 1896
- Operator: Maryland Institute College of Art

Technical details
- Grounds: 6 acres (2.4 ha)

Design and construction
- Architects: Ephraim Francis Baldwin, Josias Pennington

Other information
- Public transit: Mt. Royal/MICA station
- Mount Royal Station
- U.S. National Register of Historic Places
- U.S. National Historic Landmark
- Baltimore City Landmark
- NRHP reference No.: 73002191

Significant dates
- Added to NRHP: June 18, 1973
- Designated NHL: December 8, 1976
- Designated BCL: 1982

Mount Royal Station

General information
- Line: Baltimore and Ohio Railroad

History
- Opened: September 1, 1896; 130 years ago
- Closed: June 30, 1959; 67 years ago

Former services
Preceding station	Baltimore and Ohio Railroad	Following station
Baltimore Camden toward Chicago	Main Line	Aberdeen toward Jersey City
Baltimore Camden toward Chicago	Main Line	Baltimore Gay Street toward Jersey City
Location

The Mount Royal Station is a historic building in Baltimore, Maryland, which was the Baltimore and Ohio Railroad's third train station in Baltimore, Maryland, and is now part of the Maryland Institute College of Art (MICA) campus. The station was at the north end of the Baltimore Belt Line's Howard Street tunnel in the Bolton Hill neighborhood. It was the first railroad station in the world to have electrified passenger trains when it opened on September 1, 1896, serving the B&O's famed Royal Blue line. Following its closure as a railroad station in 1961, it became part of the Maryland Institute College of Art, where it now houses the Middendorf Gallery, as well as studio and classroom space for the university's sculpture and fiber departments.

== B&O history ==
=== Construction ===
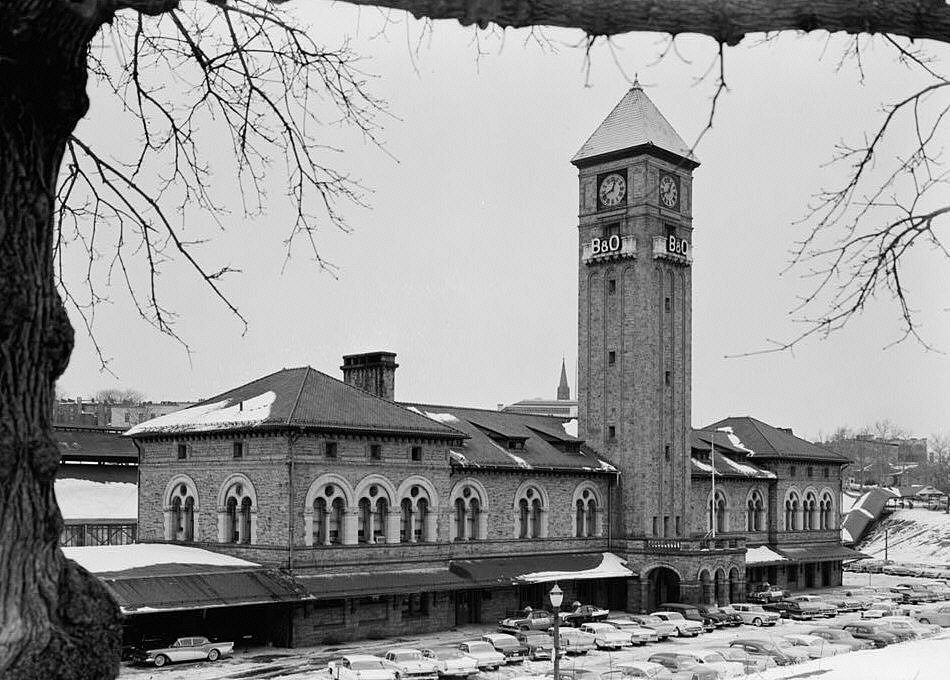
Mount Royal Station, March 1960

Designed by Baltimore architect E. Francis Baldwin in a blend of modified Romanesque and Renaissance styling, the station was constructed in 1896 by the Baltimore and Ohio Railroad (B&O) as part of its massive Baltimore Belt Line improvement project for its New York passenger service. Located at the north end of the B&O's Howard Street tunnel, the station was built of Maryland granite trimmed with Indiana limestone, with a red tile roof and landmark 150-foot (46 m) clocktower. The station's interior featured marble mosaic flooring, two fireplaces, and rocking chairs. It opened to the public on September 1, 1896. "It was considered," said the Baltimore Sun, "the most splendid station in the country built and used by only one railroad." That evaluation was shared by railroad historian Lucius Beebe, who proclaimed Mount Royal "one of the celebrated railroad stations of the world, ranking in renown with Euston Station, London, scene of so many of Sherlock Holmes' departures, the Gare du Nord in Paris, and the feudal fortress of the Pennsylvania Railroad at Broad Street, Philadelphia." A commentator for the Baltimore Evening Sun reminisced about the station years after it closed, writing that its waiting room ambiance was "like a mountain lodge after dinner", with cozy fireplaces ablaze at both ends of the station while passengers relaxed in rocking chairs serenaded by soothing recorded music.

=== Train operations ===
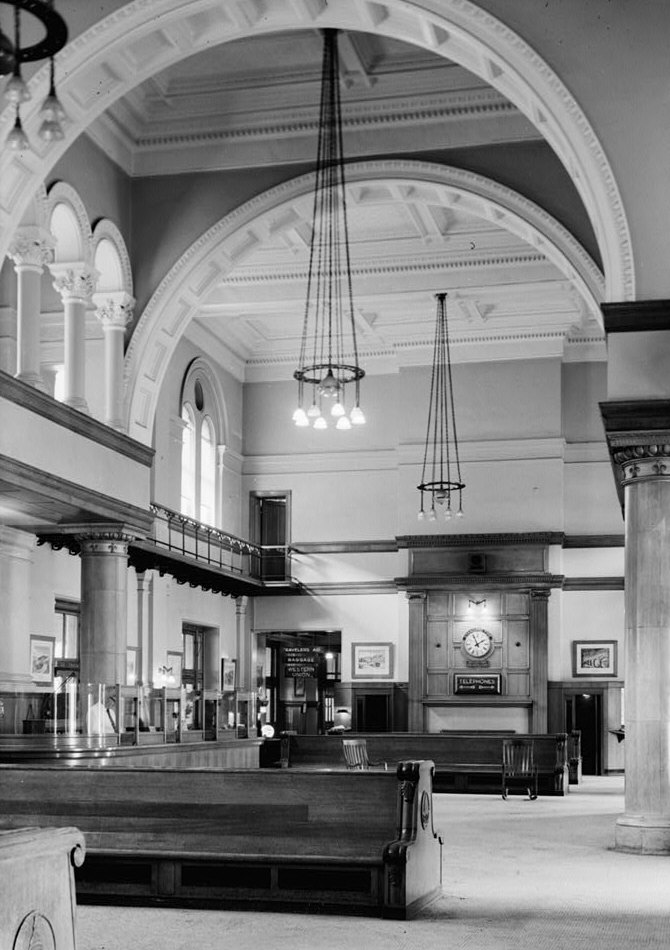
The station's interior in 1958

The B&O pioneered the first U.S. mainline railway electrification system at Mount Royal Station when it opened in 1896, installing an overhead third rail system in the station's trainshed and its tunnel approaches.

The most famous train associated with the Mount Royal Station was the Royal Blue, which ran between Washington, D.C. and New York City. Luminaries using the B&O's station over the years include U.S. Presidents Woodrow Wilson, Calvin Coolidge, Herbert Hoover, Franklin D. Roosevelt, and Dwight D. Eisenhower, along with Western showman "Buffalo Bill" Cody, singer Enrico Caruso, and celebrated conductor Arturo Toscanini, whose private Pullman car was parked on a siding during his appearances at the nearby Lyric Theatre. After the B&O ended all passenger service north of Baltimore on April 26, 1958, Mount Royal Station became the eastern terminus of B&O's passenger trains. It was one of thirteen Baltimore buildings selected in 1959 for the Historic American Buildings Survey. On June 30, 1961, the B&O consolidated its Baltimore passenger train service at Camden Station, permanently ending its use of Mount Royal Station after 65 years of operation.

== Art studio conversion ==
The vacant railroad station building, train shed, and the surrounding 3¼ acres were acquired by the Maryland Institute College of Art (MICA) in 1964 for $250,000. The sale amount was far below market value and represented "a substantial donation on the part of the B&O", said MICA officials. After $1 million was raised by MICA for the project, the station was converted for use by art students in 1967 at a final cost of $18 per square foot of building space, which was considerably less than the estimated cost for a new building of $25 per square foot. The former B&O baggage room and platform areas were enclosed for use as studios and the station's exterior and clock tower were retained. The original 800-foot (240 m) long iron trainshed remains over CSX Transportation's active mainline tracks. This adaptive reuse preserved the Mount Royal Station as an example of late 19th century industrial architecture, using it for a purpose different from its original one. Design work for the conversion was performed by Richard Donkervoet of Cochran, Stephenson and Donkervoet. Donkervoet retained as much of the building's exterior appearance as possible, and also preserved much of the interior character, including the vaulted ceilings, columns, and mosaic floor. The station renovation has been recognized for the "sensitivity by the later architects to the initial conception of the building..." and Margaret Mead, in a lecture given at the station, commented that the renovation "is perhaps the most magnificent example in the Western World of something being made into something else".

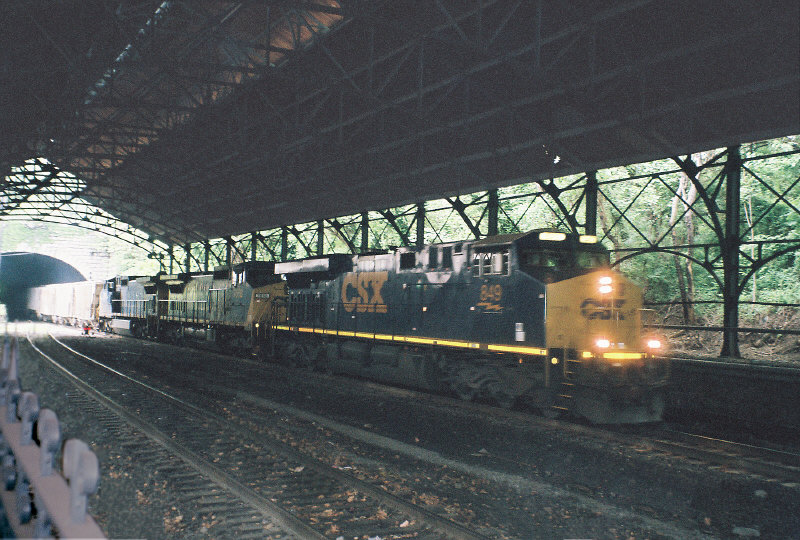
A CSX Transportation train under the trainshed in 2009

On December 8, 1976, the station was added to the register of National Historic Landmarks, granting it full protection as an historic site. The Mount Royal Station's train shed, one of the country's last remaining such structures, was renovated in 1985 due to advanced deterioration of the shed's materials. In 1992, the AIA's Baltimore chapter honored the Maryland Institute and architects Cochran, Stevenson & Donkervoet with a 25 Year Award for Excellence in Design of Enduring Significance for their adaptive reuse of the former train depot.

Between 2005 and 2007, MICA accomplished a two-phased, $6.3 million renovation of the building by the architectural firm of Grieves, Worrall, Wright & O'Hatnick, Inc. The first phase, renovation of the interior, was completed in Fall, 2005: interior finishes, such as the mosaic tile flooring, marble columns, tin ceilings, wood wainscot, and trim were cleaned and restored. Classroom space was also increased, as well as the quality and quantity of studio space. The second phase, restoration of the building's exterior and train shed, was completed in Spring, 2007: stonework and wood were cleaned, repaired, and repainted, the slate canopy restored, and the drainage system fixed; clerestory and structural timbers in the train shed were replaced and the steel roof framing was reinforced. In keeping with the pedestrian landscaping and streetscape that MICA has created along Mount Royal Avenue, a new plaza with benches, bike racks, shrubs, and ornamental grasses and ground cover was added.

The Mount Royal Station building now houses the undergraduate departments of fiber and interdisciplinary sculpture. It's facilities include workspace for sewing, weaving, dyeing, and other related processes. Additionally the building has a material library, wood shop, metal shop, foundry, digital fabrication studios as well as senior studios. The historical address of the property was 1300 West Mount Royal Avenue, but the building's address is now 1400 Cathedral Street, as the former address is now used for the university campus at large.

== See also ==
- Baltimore Terminal Subdivision
- Maryland Institute College of Art
- Mount Clare Shops
