= Official Guide of the Railways =

Magazine on rail transport

Official Railway Guide
- The modern Official Railway Guide
- Categories: Rail transport
- Frequency: Quarterly
- First issue: June 1868
- Final issue: July 2020
- Company: The Pocket List of Railroad Officials (IHS Markit)
- Country: USA
- Language: English
- Website: www.pocketlist.com
- ISSN: 0190-6704

The Official Railway Guide, originally the Official Guide of the Railways, was a quarterly magazine that published travel information. Originally produced by the National Railway Publication Company of New York City from 1868, the guide was last published by IHS Markit in mid-2020.

== History ==
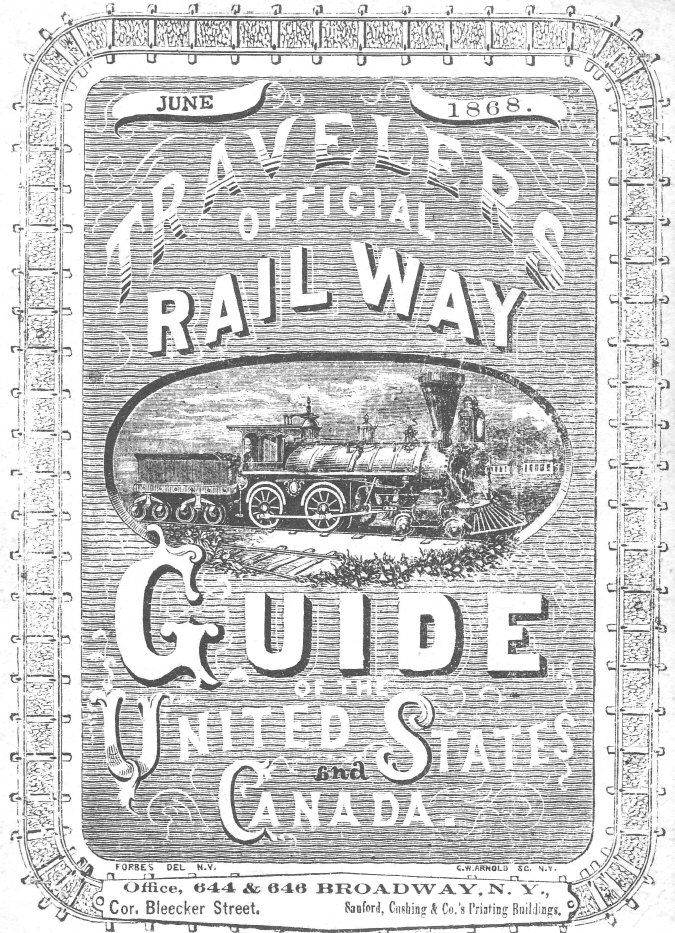
First edition, June 1868

February 1956 edition

In the post-Civil War era of the late 1860s, as the transcontinental railroad pushed westward across the prairies, the burgeoning growth of railroad passenger traffic created the need for accurate train schedule information. On October 2, 1866, the National Association of General Passenger and Ticket Agents passed a resolution calling for a "railway guide" to be published, for use as a reference by all association members. The result was the monthly publication of the Travelers Official Railway Guide of the United States, Mexico and Canada, beginning with a 200-page first edition in June 1868. Eventually the Official Guide would list all of the passenger train schedules of railroads in the United States, Canada, Mexico and Central America. At the peak of rail passenger service in the 1920s, "The Guide", as it was commonly known in the industry, exceeded 1,500 pages and was widely used by railroad personnel, travel agents, and corporate travel departments. With the advent of passenger airlines the Official Guide included schedules for major US airlines. The Official Guide was the primary reference used by ticket agents for all railroads in the U.S. and Canada, and for international rail travel to Mexico. The Guide was especially useful for constructing connections among the many railroads of the time.

The Official Guide also included some high priority freight schedules, system maps, listing of company officers, an index of all railroad stations, industry news briefs and personnel changes, rosters of key railroad officials, and new passenger train announcements, along with steamship schedules.

Other related publications produced by National Railway Publication Company and its affiliates included the Pocket List of Railroad Officials and freight equipment listings.

With the decline of long-distance passenger service in the U.S. during the 1950s–1960s and the eventual demise of passenger service by most individual railroads at the inception of Amtrak on May 1, 1971, the need for a monthly rail passenger Official Guide diminished considerably. In 1974 passenger services were spun off into a separate Official Railway Guide Passenger Edition, which discontinued in 1993.

=== Former names ===
- 1868 - Travelers Official Railway Guide of the United States and Canada
- 1870 - Travelers' Official Guide of the Railways and Steam Navigation Lines in the United States and Canada
- mid-1870s - Travelers' Official Guide of the Railway and Steam Navigation Lines in the United States and Canada
  - 1897 - and Steam Navigation Lines in the United States, Canada and Mexico
- 1900 - The Official Guide of the Railways and Steam Navigation Lines of the United States Porto Rico Canada Mexico and Cuba
  - 1908 - and Steam Navigation Lines of the United States, Porto Rico, Canada, Mexico, Cuba and Central America
  - 1910 - and Steam Navigation Lines of the United States Porto Rico Canada Mexico and Cuba also Time Tables of Railroads in Central America
  - mid-1930s - and Steam Navigation Lines of the United States Porto Rico Canada Mexico and Cuba also Time Tables of Railroads in Central America Air-Line Schedules
  - 1964 - and Steam Navigation Lines of the United States Puerto Rico Canada Mexico and Cuba also Time Tables of Railroads in Central America Air-Line Schedules
  - 1968 - and Steam Navigation Lines of the United States, Puerto Rico, Canada, Mexico and Cuba
- 1974 - The Official Railway Guide North American Freight Service Edition

== Recent publishers ==
Some of the publications by the National Railway Publishing Company were eventually acquired by UBM Global Trade (then known as Commonwealth Business Media), which in turn became a division of United Business Media. United Business Media, a United Kingdom-based firm, provided business information services principally to the technology, healthcare, media, automotive, and financial services industries. With the resurgence of rail freight in the U.S. since the 1990s, the quarterly Official Railway Guide was used by transportation and logistics managers for routing and shipping information. UBM sold the majority of its data business to Electra Partners in 2013, who formed AXIO Data Group, which was then sold to IHS in 2014. IHS discontinued production of the Official Railway Guide in mid-2020, merging with the Pocket List of Railroad Officials.
