= List of Laurel, Maryland properties in the Maryland Historical Trust =

The Maryland Historical Trust serves as the central historic preservation office in Maryland. The properties listed reside in and around modern Laurel, Maryland.

== List of properties ==
Maryland Historical Trust properties in Laurel, Maryland

- PG-LAU-01, Laurel Historic District
- PG-LAU-01-01, Sales' House, 703 N. Main Street
- PG-LAU-01-03, Mary Kraski's Double House, 708-710 N. Main Street
- PG-LAU-01-04, Marion St. Clair House, 709 N. Main Street
- PG-LAU-01,05, Mary Kraski's Double House #2, 712-714 N. Main Street
- PG-LAU-01-06, Andre-Hansen Double House, 809-811 N. Main Street
- PG-LAU-01-07, Oldest Mill House (McCeny's Brick Double House), 817-819 N. Main Street
- PG-LAU-01-08, Luther & Grace Welsh House (Daya Jain Property), 123 Second Street
- PG-LAU-01-09, James A. Clark House (Tastee Foods Property II), 121 Second Street
- PG-LAU-01-10, Thomas L. Fairall Property (Nichols and Hurtt Property), 120 Second Street
- PG-LAU-01-11, Robert Coward House, 111 Second Street
- PG-LAU-01-13, Isabella Whitworth House (Williams Property), 105 Second Street
- PG-LAU-01-14, Thomas Young House (Wesmar Enterprises Property), 200 Main Street
- PG-LAU-01-12, Fairall Foundry (First Street Foundry), First Street
- PG-LAU-01-16, Tastee Diner Property (Tastee Foods Property I), 118 Washington Boulevard
- PG-LAU-01-18, Ward Building (Laurel Plumbing Supply Property), 132 Washington Boulevard (US 1)
- PG-LAU-01-21, Montgomery Street Historic District, Between Washington Boulevard and Eleventh Street and Main and Montgomery Streets
- PG-LAU-01-21, Phelps and Shaffer, 900 Montgomery Street
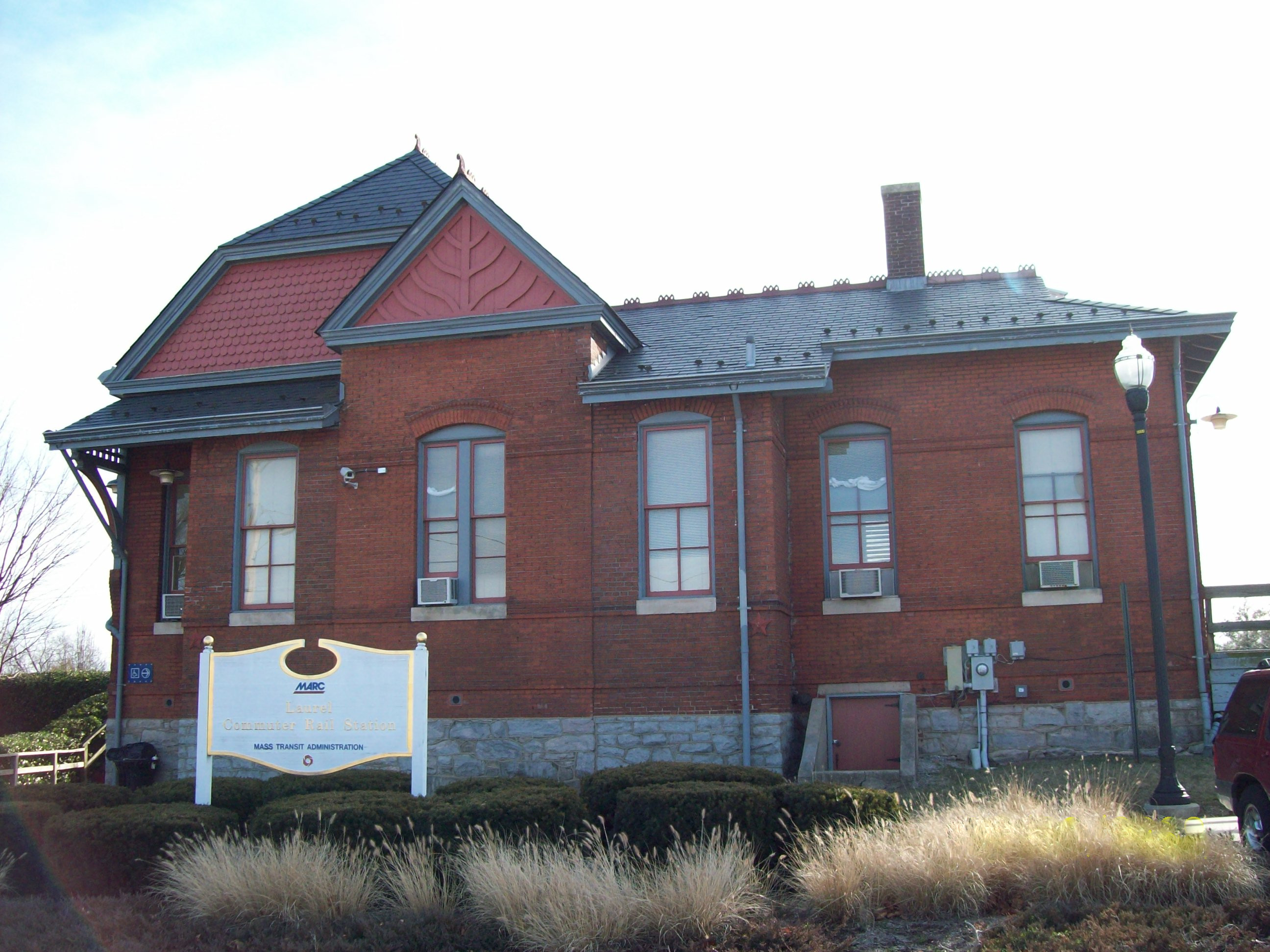
  PG-LAU-06 B&O Train station, Laurel
- PG-LAU-02, St. Mark's Methodist Episcopal Church, 601 Eighth Street
- PG-LAU-03, Ivy Hill Cemetery, Sandy Spring Road (MD 198)
- PG-LAU-04, Avondale Mill (Crabbs Mill), 21 Avondale Street
- PG-LAU-05, Laurel High School, 701 Montgomery Street
- PG-LAU-06, Laurel Railroad Station (Baltimore & Ohio Railroad Station, Laurel)
- PG-LAU-07, Eisenhower House (Mrs. Ray's Boarding House), 327 Montgomery Street
- PG-LAU-08, Gude House (Jardin, Armand House, Winterburne), 13910 Laurel Lakes Avenue
- PG-LAU-09, Louisa S.B. Cowden House (CAM Associates Property), 804 Lafayette Avenue
- PG-LAU-10, Stewart Manor Neighborhood,
- PG-LAU-11, E. Wright Newman House (Melbourne and Feagin Apartments), 320 Second Street
- PG-LAU-12, Cronmiller House (Mercurio House), 200 Laurel Ave.
- PG-LAU-13, John R. Jones Subdivision, 308-318 Second Street
- PG-LAU-14, Channey-Jones Property (Melbourne and Feagin Property), 306 Second Street
- PG-LAU-15, Samuel Phillips House, 300 Second Street
- PG-LAU-16, The Free Quill Building (Heier Property I), 126 Washington Boulevard (US 1)
- PG-LAU-17, Charles F. Shaffer House (Heier Property II), 130 Washington Boulevard (US 1)
- PG-LAU-18, Ward Building (Laurel Plumbing Supply Property), 132 Washington Boulevard (US 1)
- PG-LAU-19, Fisher Building (Laurel Realty Company, Inc.), 150 Washington Boulevard (US 1)
- PG-LAU-23, Richard Hill Property (Sylvester G. Frederick, Jr. Property), 7401 Old Sandy Spring Road
- PG-LAU-24, Bridge 16001, Washington Boulevard (US 1) over Patuxent River
