= Laurel Branch Library =

Library in Maryland, U.S.

Coordinates: 39°6′12.11″N 76°51′22.16″W

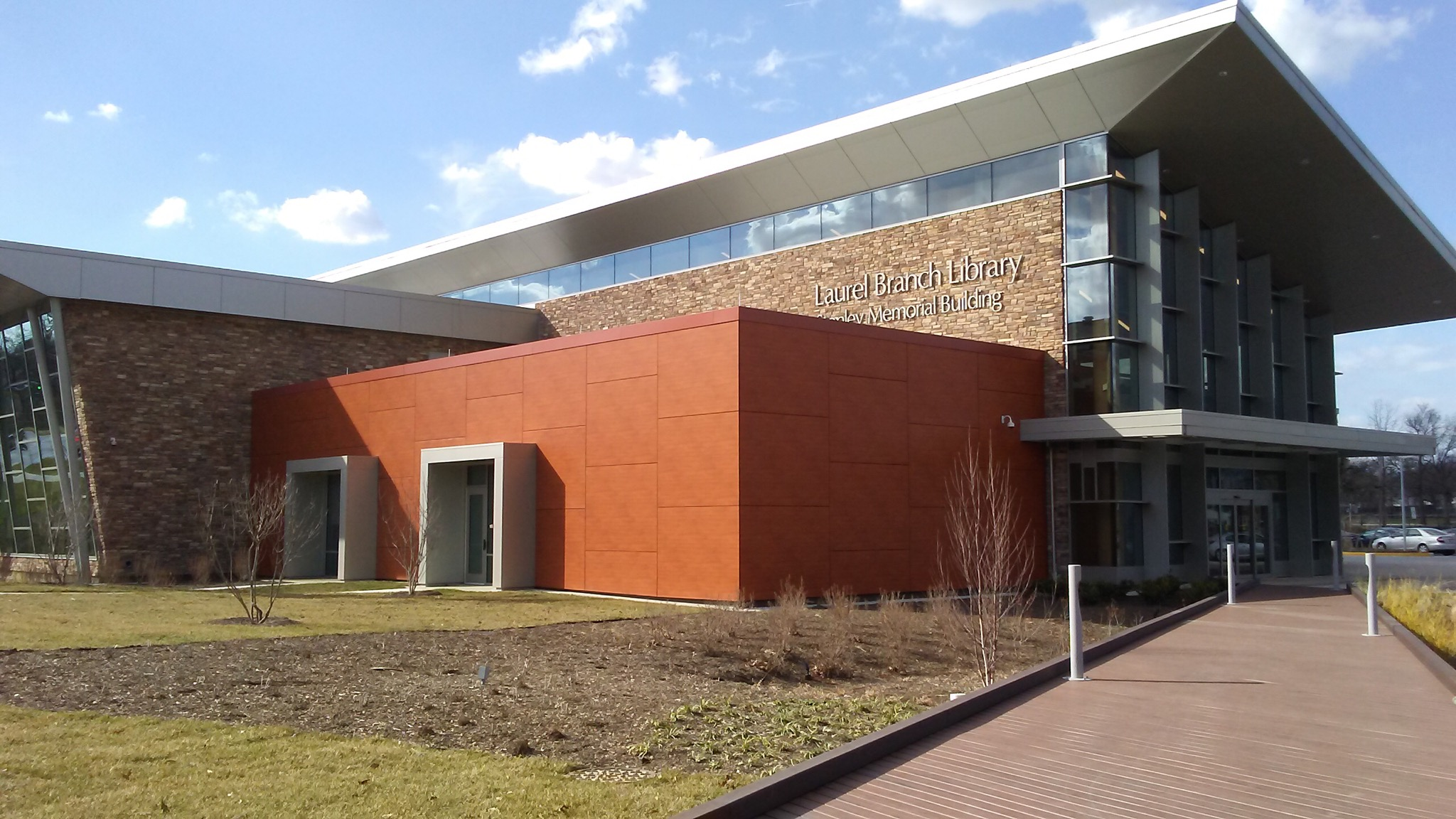
- Location: 507 Seventh Street; Laurel, Maryland 20707, United States
- Type: Public library
- Established: May 1967; 59 years ago
- Branch of: Prince George's County Memorial Library System

Other information
- Website: www.pgcmls.info/branch/location/Laurel

Laurel Branch Library is the Laurel, Maryland branch of the Prince George's County Memorial Library System, at the intersection of Seventh Street and Talbott Avenue. The current Stanley Memorial Building opened to the public on November 28, 2016.

This branch's buildings have been named after the family of Charles H. Stanley, who was a city commissioner (1880–1882), mayor (1891–1893), and state comptroller (1911–1912). Friends of the Laurel Library, a philanthropic group of local community members, has supported the branch since January 1996.

== Features ==
The library features over 50,000 books, DVDs, and magazines. Patrons have access to color printers and 53 computers. A double-sided fireplace offers warmth near a reading area, and a children's room uses a dinosaur theme, a nod to the Dinosaur Park near Laurel. A gaming room may be used to play video games. For those short on time, the library has a drive-through window for picking up and returning library materials.

The Laurel Branch of the Prince George's County Memorial Library System was the recipient of the 2018 AIA/ALA Library Building Awards for excellence in architectural design. The public art commission for the Laurel library front entrance was awarded to the Washington Glass School. The 16-foot (4.9 m) high glass-and-steel sculpture was made involving the surrounding community and library groups. In a series of glass making workshops, images of books and stories, education and learning, and shared aspirations were created at the Washington Glass School to be incorporated into the internally illuminated tower.

== History ==
Laurel's first library opened in 1916 in the Patuxent Bank Building and moved to 384 Main Street in 1929 in space shared with the Woman's Club of Laurel. The library got a building of its own in 1967.

The former branch building, named Stanley Memorial Library, was dedicated on May 7, 1967 and completed a major expansion in 1993. Having outgrown its building, plans were made beginning in 2005 to replace it with a new facility. The library closed on March 8, 2014, and reopened at a temporary location behind the Laurel Municipal Center on March 31, 2014, to allow for construction. After nearly a year of delay, construction of the $14 million project was to begin in October/November 2014 with a grand opening in early 2016. The project's groundbreaking ceremony occurred on May 27, 2015, with an updated opening set for the last quarter of 2016.

The Prince George's County Board of Library Trustees decided in January 2014 to remove the Stanley name from the new library, to be consistent in naming branches after their location rather than after people. A coalition of residents, including Mayor Craig Moe, campaigned to keep the Stanley name for historic reasons, and noted that the library was built on land donated by the Stanley family and named in accordance with the deed. Other residents said Charles Stanley was a Confederate soldier and by association was pro-slavery and his name should not be on the building. Library officials ultimately decided to keep the Stanley name on the building and place a memorial plaque in the building's lobby.
