= Bert Sadler =

American photographer (1875-1963)

- Born: October 31, 1875; Laurel, Maryland
- Died: 1963; Laurel, Maryland
- Known for: Photography

Robert "Bert" Sadler, Jr. (October 31, 1875 – 1963) was an American photographer who captured daily life in at the start of the 20th-century in suburban America.

== Biography ==
Sadler was born in 1875 in Laurel, Maryland, to pharmacist Robert H. Sadler and his first wife Margaret Miller Jackson McCeney. He attended Eastern High School in Washington, D.C., and then began work in the clerical offices of the Baltimore and Ohio Railroad. In 1909 he began working for the Post Office Department's Postal Savings Division, from which he retired in 1946 as a clerk in the Third Assistant Postmaster General's office. Sadler never married, and spent his entire life living in the house he was born.

In 1905, while still working for the Baltimore and Ohio Railroad, he acquired an 1897 Eastman Kodak camera and began documenting pre-WWI life in the prosperous town of Laurel, then a notable stopping point between Washington, D.C., and Baltimore, Maryland. He was a prolific photographer of the experience of a small town as it shifted from a mill town to a suburb, and captured the daily experiences of many of the town's residents and its bustling main street. According to critic Ferdinand Protzman

What Sadler documented so carefully was the middle-class milieu in which he lived, the changing face of the town and the physical beauty of the surrounding countryside.

Sadler's photographic subjects include the Laurel Park Racetrack, Laurel High School, and the Laurel Dam, as well as his friends, families, and businesses in the city's Main Street. While most of his images are of people and places within his hometown, Sadler also ventured into Gettysburg, Philadelphia, and Washington, D.C., to capture landscape subjects. Even though he never received formal photographic training, Sadler was meticulous in detailing the technical information for his images.

The Maryland Historical Society acquired approximately 80 of Sadler's photographs in 1968. In the mid 1990s Sadler's gave his scrapbooks and 1,300 glass plate negatives on permanent loan to the Laurel Museum for the creation of the Sadler Collection, formally donating the works in 2007.

== Exhibitions ==
- Bert Sadler's Laurel: Photographs from 1905 to 1917, 1997
- Snapshots in Time: Our Community in 1910 and 2010, 2010
- Behind the Bricks: 20 Years of the Laurel Museum, 2016
