= Gude House =

Historic structure in Maryland, U.S.

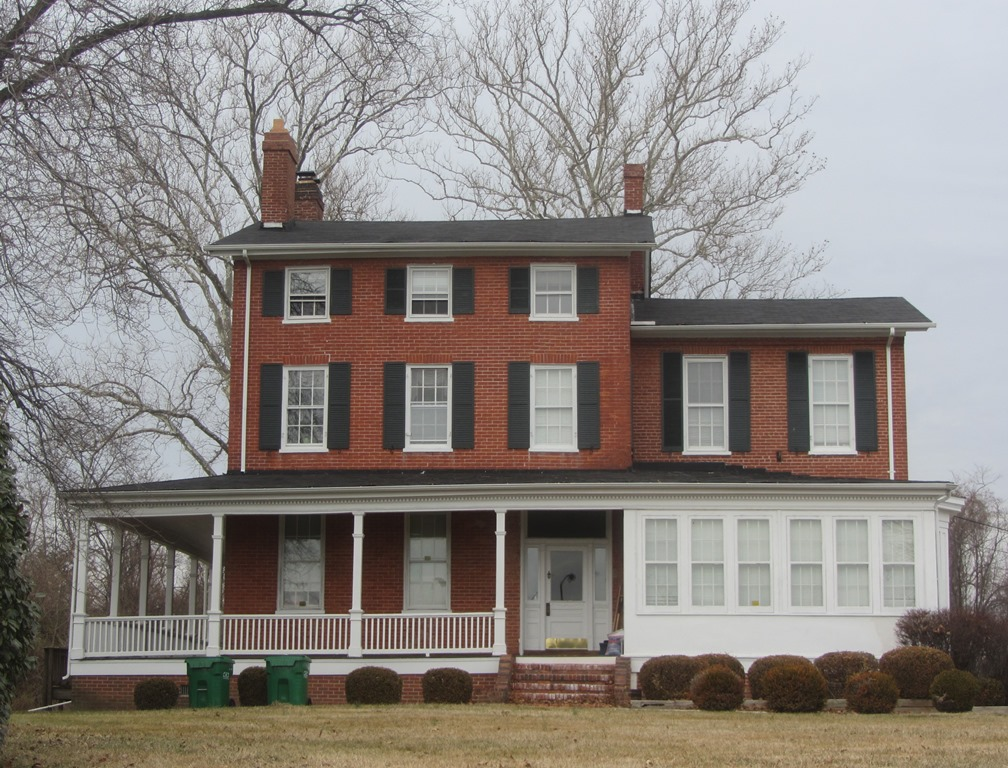
- Gude House in 2015

- Location within Maryland
- 39°04′54.2″N 76°51′58.5″W
- Nearest city: Laurel, Maryland

History
- Built: 1856

Site notes
- Architectural style: Greek Revival

The Gude House is a historic house located in Laurel, Maryland in Prince George's, Maryland, United States.

The property was originally part of Snowden's New Birmingham Manor. Mary Tyson and her sisters, who had opened a seminary in Washington, D.C. in the 1800s, opened their second ("Alnwick") seminary in southwest Laurel in 1855 on part of the Snowden property they purchased, and the Society of Friends provided a non-secular curriculum. This three-story brick building was featured in an 1852 lithograph; fire destroyed the seminary building in 1920.

The three-story brick building with a kitchen addition and second wing were built in 1856 by John D. McPherson who bought 50 acres of land just south of the Alnwick Seminary building from the Tyson sisters. In 1866 the property was expanded with 8 acres purchased from Samuel Register. In 1875, French horticulturalist Armand Jardin purchased the property, living onsite until 1904. In 1926, after a succession of short-term owners, William Gude purchased and restored the property which remained in his family until 1980. Gude was a greenhouse and retail flower shop owner.

The property was subdivided in 1988 for commercial office parks at Laurel Lakes with 1.3 acres and the Gude house remaining.

== See also ==
- List of Laurel Maryland properties in the Maryland Historical Trust
- Birmingham Manor (Maryland)
