= Laurel Museum =

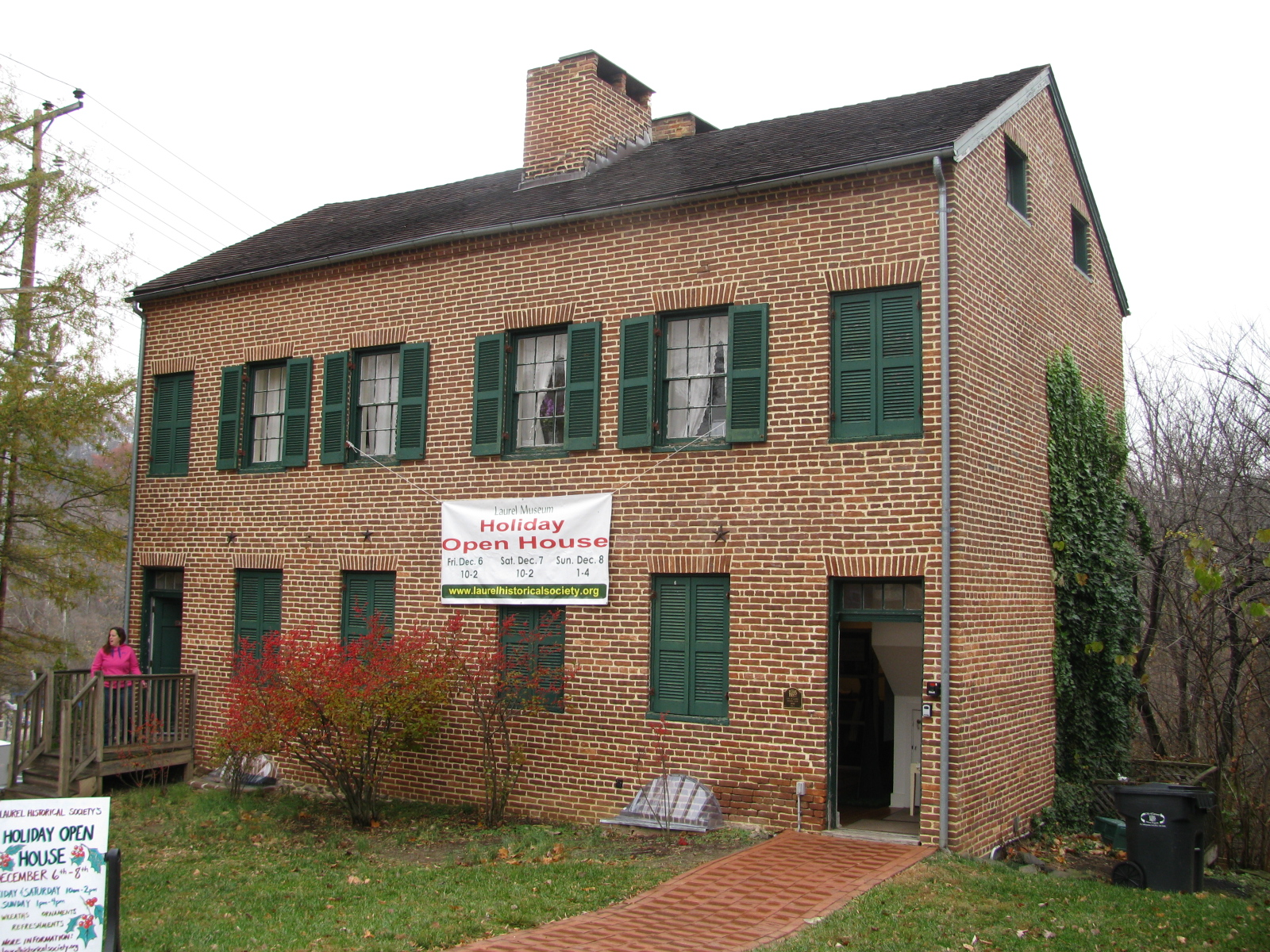
- on November 16, 2013
- Established: May 1, 1996
- Location: 817 Main Street, Laurel, Maryland
- Coordinates: 39.11°N 76.8572°W
- Type: Local history museum
- Director: Kristen Norton
- Public transit access: Laurel MARC; or CMRT routes C, G, or H
- Website: laurelhistoricalsociety.org

The Laurel Museum is a museum in Laurel, Maryland, in the United States. It is located in a mill workers' home that was built by Horace Capron between 1836 and 1840. It was restored by the City of Laurel, and opened to the public on May 1, 1996. Located on the northeast corner of 9th and Main Streets, the museum has exhibits that highlight the history of Laurel and its citizens. A gift shop is available and museum admission is free.

The 2,590-square-foot (241 m^{2}) brick and stone building was built with four living units, and was later converted into a two-family house. It was then transformed into a commercial property, and before its abandonment in the 1970s was a rental home and storage warehouse. In 1985 the building was purchased by the City of Laurel from the State of Maryland.

The museum is operated by the Laurel Historical Society, a tax-exempt educational organization that was founded as the Laurel Horizon Society in 1976. The society received permission to use the city-owned building for a museum with the adoption of a resolution by the mayor and city council on February 25, 1991. The building was then renovated between 1993 and 1996, when it opened to the public. The museum's research library is named after John Calder Brennan, a local historian who died three months before the museum's opening.

The estate of photographer Bert Sadler gave the museum Sadler's notebooks and 1300 glass plate negatives to form The Sadler Collection. Starting as a permanent loan, this was ratified as a formal donation in 2007.

== See also ==
- List of historical societies in Maryland
