= Ivy Hill Cemetery =

Ivy Hill Cemetery may refer to:

- Ivy Hill Cemetery (Maryland)
- Ivy Hill Cemetery (Philadelphia)
- Ivy Hill Cemetery (Alexandria, Virginia)
- Ivy Hill Cemetery (Smithfield, Virginia)
