= Oseh Shalom Synagogue =

American synagogue in Laurel, Maryland, US

Oseh Shalom
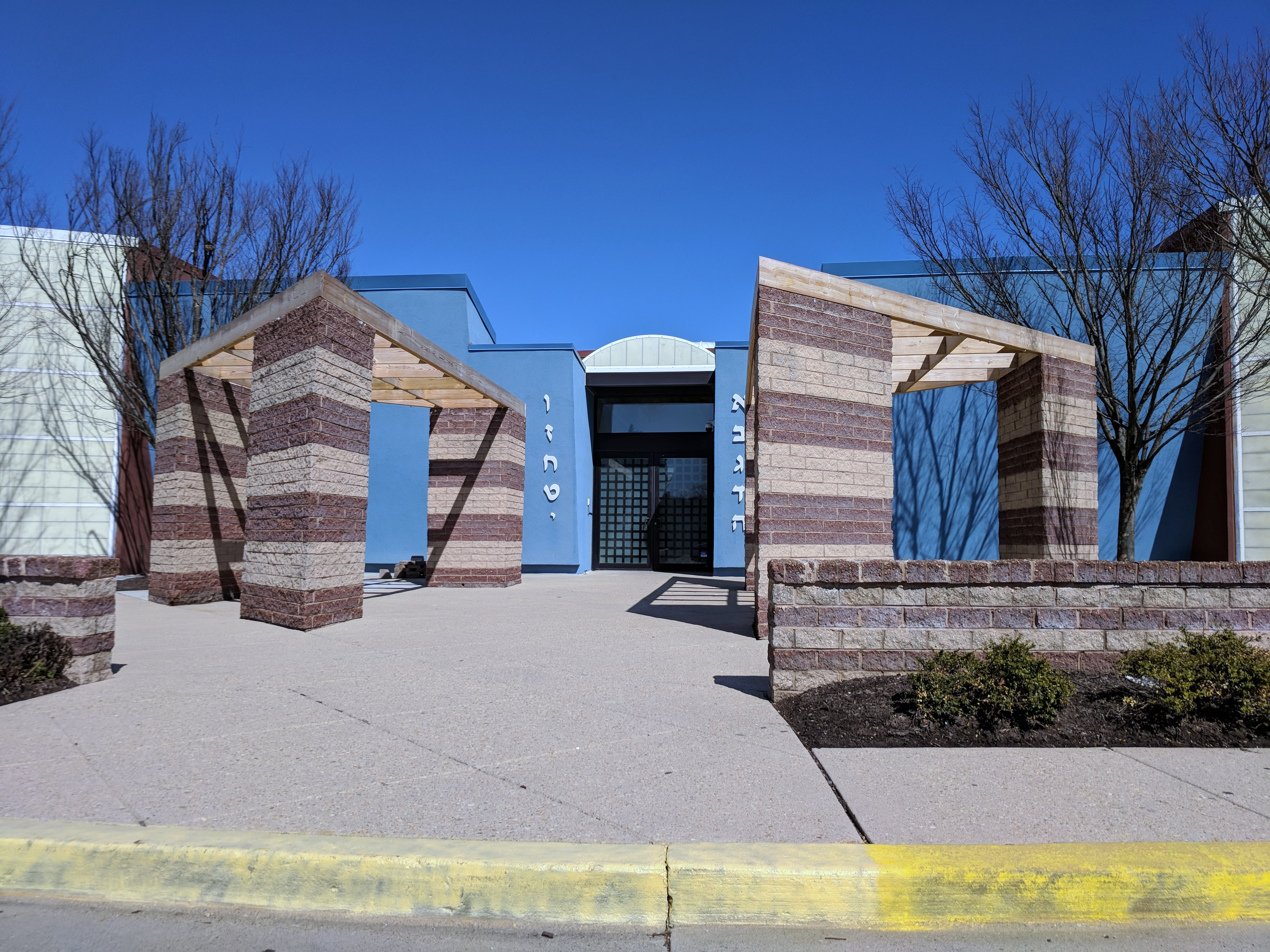

- Location in Maryland

Religion
- Affiliation: Reconstructionist Judaism
- Ecclesiastical or organisational status: Synagogue
- Leadership: Rabbi Daria Jacobs-Velde; Rabbi Josh Jacobs-Velde
- Status: Active

Location
- Location: 7515 Olive Branch Way, Laurel, Maryland
- Country: United States
- Coordinates: 39°05′20″N 76°52′41″W

Architecture
- Architect: Travis Price
- Type: Synagogue
- Style: Modernist
- Established: 1966 (as a congregation)
- Completed: 1991

Specifications
- Dome: 1
- Dome dia. (outer): 35 feet (11 m)

Website
- oseh-shalom.org

Oseh Shalom is a Reconstructionist synagogue in Laurel, Maryland, in the United States. It is the only synagogue in Laurel, and one of five Reconstructionist synagogues in the Baltimore-Washington Metropolitan Area. Members of the community hail from many nearby areas, including Howard, Montgomery, Prince George's, and Anne Arundel counties.

Oseh Shalom was founded in 1966, and affiliated with the Reconstructionist movement in 1979.

Oseh Shalom is known for its distinctive synagogue building, with its blue "wings" and glowing dome. Weekly Sabbath tefillah services, religious school, adult education, High Holy Day and festival services and numerous other programs occur onsite. Oseh Shalom has a vibrant program for children from birth to Bar/Bat Mitzvah and beyond.

Daria and Josh Jacobs Velde, a married team of rabbis, became the congregation's rabbis in August 2017. Caitlin McLaughlin became the congregation's cantor in 2021. Rabbi Rebecca Gould is the director of the religious school at Oseh Shalom. Cantor Emeritus Charlie Bernhardt has been with Oseh Shalom since 1983.

== See also ==
- History of the Jews in Maryland
