= William B. Clagett =

21st Comptroller of Maryland (1854–1911)

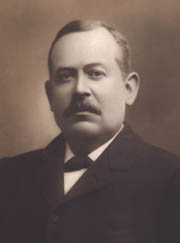
- William B. Clagett, Maryland Comptroller 1910–1911

21st Comptroller of Maryland
- In office June 1, 1910 – July 25, 1911
- Governor: Austin Lane Crothers
- Preceded by: Joshua W. Hering
- Succeeded by: Charles H. Stanley

Maryland State Senator
- In office 1898–1901 and 1906–1910
- Constituency: Prince George's County, Maryland

Personal details
- Born: August 13, 1854 near Upper Marlboro, Maryland, US
- Died: July 25, 1911 (aged 56) Buffalo Lithia Springs, Virginia, US
- Resting place: Trinity Protestant Episcopal Church, Upper Marlboro, Maryland
- Party: Democratic
- Spouse: Kate Croswell Duckett (1857–1906) on December 3, 1883; Estelle Noble Keiholtz (d. 1933) c. 1909
- Relations: Charles Clagett and Mary (Mullikin) Clagett
- Children: 5

William Baruch Clagett (August 12 or 13, 1854 – July 25, 1911) was a Maryland tidewater tobacco farmer. In 1892, he was appointed as tobacco inspector (Note: For a description of the office of Tobacco Inspector in Maryland, see Steiner, Bernard Christian (1899). "Miscellaneous Officers and Boards". The Institutions and Civil Government of Maryland. Boston: Ginn & Company. pp. 88–89.) by Governor Frank Brown; he also served as chair of the Democratic State Central Committee. In 1894, Clagett missed election to the U.S. House of Representatives by one vote. Instead, Clagett entered politics when elected as a state senator from Prince George's County in 1897, serving from 1898 to 1901 and 1906 to 1910. Governor Austin L. Crothers appointed Clagett as the 21st Comptroller of Maryland, replacing Joshua W. Hering who had been appointed to the Maryland Public Service Commission. Clagett died of Bright's disease and was interred at Trinity Protestant Episcopal Church, in Upper Marlboro, where he had served as a vestryman. As of March 2002, Clagett's farm, Navajo, was still in operation, by the eleventh generation of his family. After descendant Charles Clagett's death in 1971, with his will having made clear that he wanted the property used for educational purposes, his estate bequeathed the farm's 283 acres (115 ha) to the Chesapeake Bay Foundation in 1981.

== Notes ==
Political offices
Preceded by Joshua W. Hering	Comptroller of Maryland; June 1910 – July 25, 1911	Succeeded by Charles H. Stanley
