= Edward Phelps (mayor) =

American politician (1861–1931)

Mayor of Laurel, Maryland
- In office 1895–1902
- Preceded by: Gustavus B. Timanus
- Succeeded by: Gustavus Timanus

Personal details
- Born: January 5, 1861 Laurel, Maryland
- Died: May 12, 1931 (aged 70) Annapolis, Maryland
- Spouse(s): Sivilla Sewall, Helen Shaughnessy
- Children: Four surviving daughters: Eva Dean, Edna Phelps, Maude Beall, Lillian Phelps; five surviving sons, Harry S., Arthur P., Charles E., Alan, and William.
- Parent: Edward J. Phelps
- Profession: Businessman, The Phelps & Shaffer Co.
- Accomplishments: Civic improvements including electricity, a water works, three bridges, train and telephone service; built Phelps Mansion

Edward Phelps (January 5, 1861 – May 12, 1931), son of Edward J. Phelps, was a seven-term mayor of Laurel, Maryland, from 1895 to 1902.

He brought to Laurel "electric lights, water works, improved streets, brick pavements, [an] electric railroad between Laurel and Washington, improved train service, free express delivery, telephone exchange system, three steel bridges over the Patuxent River and [a] night robe factory". As of 1908, the night robe factory was run by E. Rosenfeld & Co.

== Life and family ==
Phelps was born in Laurel on January 5, 1861. He married Sevilla Sewall, and they had eleven children, two of whom died in infancy – Mable and Robert. His four surviving daughters were Eva Dean (married George Dean), Edna Phelps, Maude Beall (married Norris Beall), and Lillian Phelps, and his five surviving sons were Harry S., Arthur P., Charles E., Alan, and William. After Sewall died, Phelps married Helen Shaughnessy of Bryn Mawr, Pennsylvania. They had no children.

Phelps died in Annapolis on May 12, 1931.

== The Phelps & Shaffer Co. ==
Phelps formed a partnership with Charles F. Shaffer, Jr., and together they founded The Phelps & Shaffer Co. The store sold everything from clothespins to pianos. At 9th and Montgomery Streets, its building later housed the Laurel Volunteer Fire Department, Laurel City Hall and Police Department, and currently the Harrison-Beard Community Center.

== Laurel High School ==
Phelps was instrumental in the 1899 founding of Laurel High School, the first high school in Prince George's County. When the project's low bidder failed to give bond and didn't continue with the contract, Phelps assumed the risk for completion of the work at that price (ultimately losing $1000 of his own money).

== Phelps Mansion ==
Phelps built the house at 1110 Montgomery Street in 1888, and his family lived there until March 4, 1915.
