= Eisenhower House (Laurel, Maryland) =

Eisenhower House (Mrs. Ray's Boarding House)
- Location within Maryland
- 39°06′14.1768″N 76°50′53.4588″W
- Nearest city: Laurel, Maryland

History
- Built: 1879

Site notes
- Architectural style: Victorian

The Eisenhower House, also known as "Mrs. Ray's Boarding House," is a historic house constructed in 1879 located in Laurel in Prince George's County, Maryland, United States listed in the Maryland Historical Trust.

Originally constructed in 1879 as a private residence shortly after the incorporation of the city of Laurel, the building is a two-story, L-shaped structure four bays wide. The three rightmost bays along the south side of the building function as the front of the building and connect to a covered porch, while the leftmost bay projects forward to create the building's L-shape. The floor plan of the structure follows a center-passage plan, with the entrance and stair hall connecting from the second bay from the left when facing the front of the building. The interior of the first floor of the house retains most of the original Victorian decoration. After initial construction, a shed kitchen was added to the rear of the building. Most of the building is covered with a gabled roof, excepting the porch and shed kitchen which are covered by a shed roof.

== Mrs. Ray's Boarding House ==
327 Montgomery Street was purchased in March 1919 by Mr. and Mrs. Thomas Ray. In the spring of 1919 Thomas Ray suffered a stroke, and a one-story enclosed porch was constructed on the west side of the building to provide Ray a space to recuperate. At the same time the Rays began to rent out rooms in the house to provide supplemental income, and the building became known as Mrs. Ray's Boarding House.

== Dwight and Mamie Eisenhower ==
Also in March 1919, then-Major Dwight D. Eisenhower was transferred from Fort Benning to Camp Meade, where he had previously organized the 65th Engineer Battalion in early 1918. In June 1919 his wife Mamie Eisenhower, who had been living in Denver with their son Doud, joined Dwight in Maryland while Doud remained in Colorado with family. Due to a housing shortage at Camp Meade, the Eisenhowers were forced to find off-base housing and rented a room on the second floor of the northwest corner of Mrs. Ray's Boarding House. The Eisenhowers remained in residence at 327 Montgomery Street for approximately six weeks, often having their meals nearby at Mrs. Halverson's Boarding House, located along U.S. Route 1. After approximately six weeks Mamie Eisenhower returned to Denver to be with Doud, and shortly after Dwight Eisenhower took part in the 1919 Motor Transport Corps convoy, which was designed to test and highlight the need for improved road construction throughout the nation.

The Eisenhower House was added to the Maryland Historical Trust in 1985.

== See also ==
- List of Laurel Maryland properties in the Maryland Historical Trust
- Military career of Dwight D. Eisenhower
