= John Calder Brennan =

American historian

- Born: November 19, 1908
- Died: February 6, 1996 (aged 87)
- Resting place: St. Lawrence Cemetery, Sumter County, South Carolina
- Education: The Citadel (B.A.); George Washington University (J.D.)
- Known for: Local and national historian

John Calder Brennan (November 19, 1908 – February 6, 1996) was a Laurel, Maryland historian.

A member of the class of 1930 at The Citadel, where he majored in English and History, Brennan retired as a personnel specialist for the Federal Reserve. He was a Laurel resident for more than 50 years and wrote a column on history and etymology for the Laurel Leader newspaper in the 1960s and 1970s. Considered a Booth scholar, Brennan wrote the article "John Wilkes Booth's Enigmatic Brother Joseph", published in the Spring 1983 issue of Maryland Historical Magazine. Also among Brennan's works is The Three Versions of the Testimony in the 1865 Conspiracy Trial, published in 1983 and cited in the book Blood on the Moon: The Assassination of Abraham Lincoln. The Laurel Museum's research library is named after Brennan, whose works are among its major holdings. A World War II veteran who served as a Major in the U.S. Army Air Corps, Brennan is interred at St. Lawrence Cemetery in Sumter County, South Carolina.
