= Charles H. Stanley =

22nd Comptroller of Maryland (1842–1913)

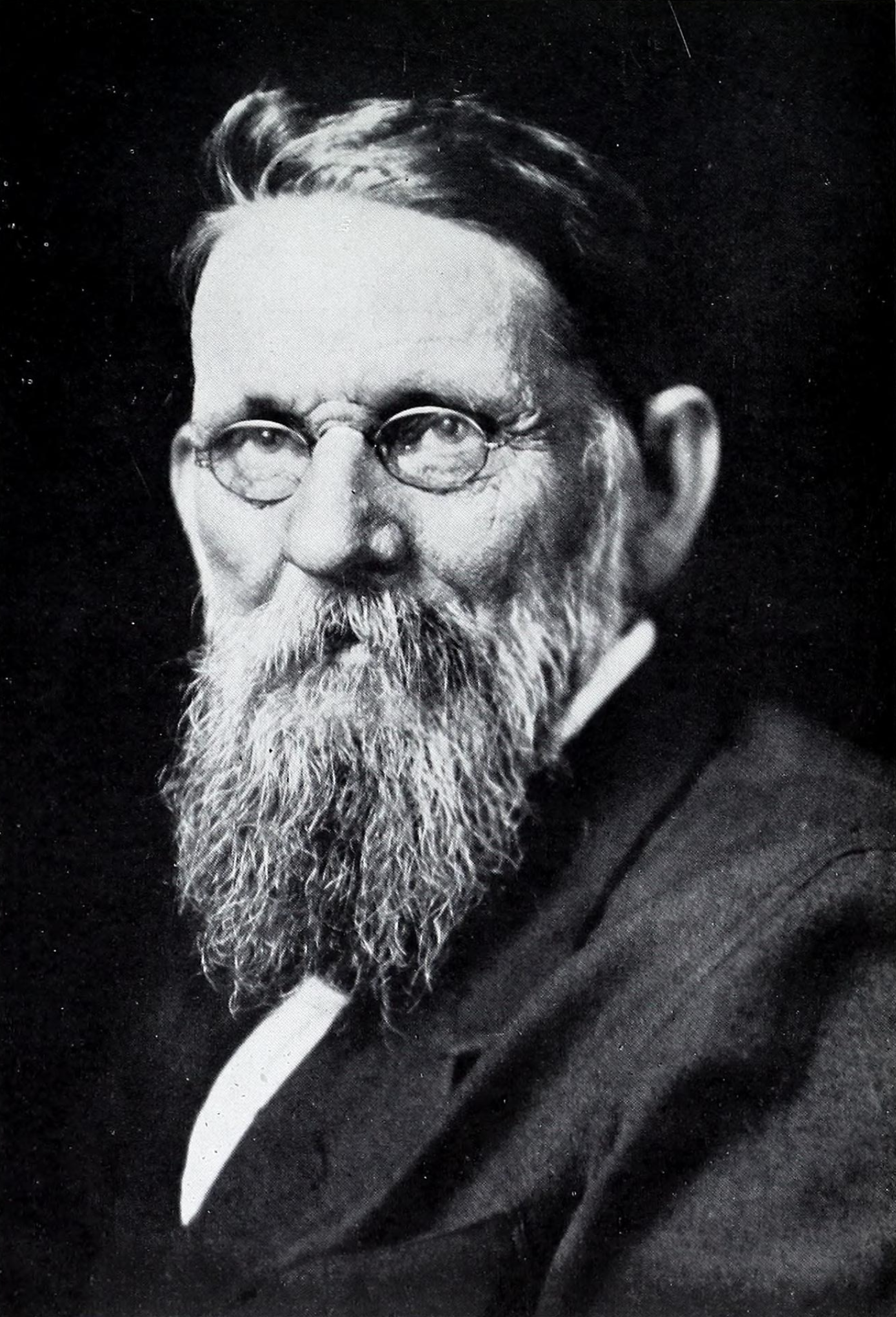
- Stanley in 1914 publication

22nd Comptroller of Maryland
- In office 1911–1912
- Governor: Austin Lane Crothers
- Preceded by: William B. Clagett
- Succeeded by: Emerson C. Harrington

2nd Mayor of Laurel, Maryland
- In office 1891–1893
- Preceded by: Judson T. Cull
- Succeeded by: J.R. Huntt

Personal details
- Born: November 20, 1842 Saybrook, Connecticut, U.S.
- Died: December 20, 1913 (aged 71) Laurel, Maryland, U.S.
- Resting place: Ivy Hill Cemetery; Laurel, Maryland, U.S.
- Party: Democratic
- Spouses: Ella Lee Hodges (m. 1871; died 1881) Margaret Snowden (m. 1884–1913)
- Children: 9

Charles Harvey Stanley (November 20, 1842 – December 20, 1913) was an American lawyer and Democratic Party politician.

== Early life and family ==
Stanley, a descendant of James Stanley, 7th Earl of Derby, was born on November 20, 1842, in Saybrook, Connecticut, to Rev. Dr. Harvey Stanley and Mary Anne (Kinne) Stanley of North Carolina. In 1851, he moved to Prince George's County, Maryland with his parents, where he attended local schools and received private tutoring.

He was a Confederate American Civil War veteran, having served as a private in Company B of the First Regiment, Maryland Cavalry from 1862 to 1865. Upon enlistment, he was 19 years old, 5 feet 10 inches tall, and light complected with light hair and gray eyes. After his military service, Stanley taught school and studied law under General Thomas Bowie; he was admitted to the Maryland Bar in 1869.

Stanley married his first wife, Ella Lee Hodges (January 1841 – October 1, 1881) on November 26, 1871; the couple moved to Laurel and had no children. Margaret Snowden, a descendant of the Snowden family that settled Laurel, became Stanley's second wife on September 11, 1884. Nine children were born of this marriage, six of whom survived to 1907: Harvey; Charles H. Stanley, Jr.; William; John Snowden; Margaret Snowden; and Elizabeth Hopkins.

== Career ==
Stanley was a farmer, farm investor, and charter member of the Vansville Farmers' Club of Prince George's County. He also worked as a banker, including roles as founder and president of Citizens National Bank of Laurel from March 1890 to 1913. Stanley was director of the B&O Railroad from 1883 to 1886 and a member and chairman of the executive committee of the Board of Trustees for Maryland Agricultural College, the original chartered name of the University of Maryland, from 1882. He worked for the School Commissioners of Prince George's County and was elected in 1906 to the office of first vice-president by the Association of School Commissioners and County Superintendents of Maryland. Additionally, he was a member and president of the Maryland State Board of Education; an attorney for the Laurel Building Association; chancellor of the Washington Diocese of the Protestant Episcopal Church; vestryman of St. Philip's Protestant Episcopal Church in Laurel and superintendent of its Sunday school; member and past master of the Laurel Wreath Lodge, Ancient Free and Accepted Masons; and member of the Law and Order Society of Laurel.

== Political service ==
Stanley served as a city commissioner for Laurel, Maryland from 1880 to 1882, a member of the Maryland House of Delegates from 1883 to 1885, and mayor of Laurel from 1891 to 1893 (two terms). In 1911, Stanley was appointed by Governor Austin Lane Crothers as the Comptroller of Maryland to complete the term of William B. Clagett, who died in office after his own appointment to complete a predecessor's term.

== Death and legacy ==
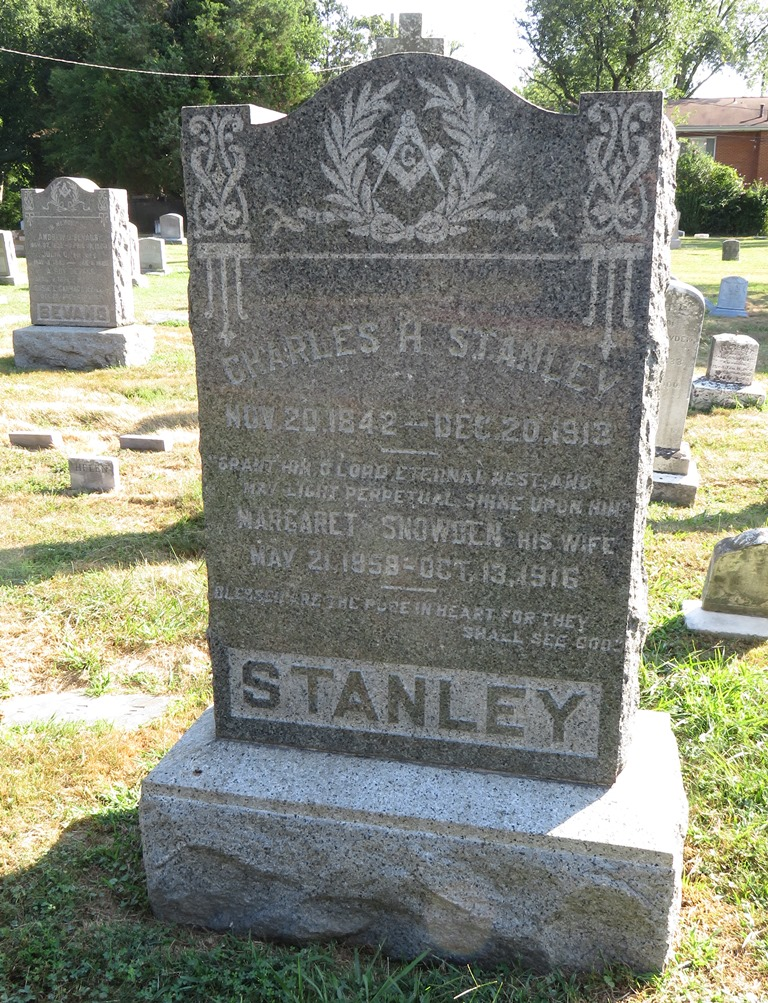
Headstone of Charles H. Stanley at Ivy Hill

After a two-month illness, Stanley died of heart and kidney trouble on December 20, 1913, while asleep at his home in Laurel, Maryland. His burial site is in section E. 108 of Ivy Hill Cemetery in Laurel.

Land inherited by Stanley's heirs included the downtown Laurel area bounded by Montgomery Street, Fifth Street, Gorman Avenue, and Eighth Street. The Laurel branch buildings of the Prince George's County Memorial Library System have been named in memory of the Stanley family, who deeded land for the branch to the library system for $10 in 1963.

Stanley's son William served as an Assistant Attorney General in President Franklin Roosevelt's administration in the 1930s. Others among his four sons served as trustees for Citizens National Bank.

Political offices
| Preceded by Frank T. Browning, Joseph K. Roberts and DeWilton Snowden | Maryland House of Delegates; Prince George's County; 1883–1885 with Alvin M. Bond and John Gourley | Succeeded by Charles E. Coffin, J. Benson Perrie and Richard Wootton |
| Preceded by Judson T. Cull | Mayor of Laurel, Maryland; April 8, 1891 – April 5, 1893 | Succeeded by J.R. Huntt |
| Preceded by William B. Clagett | Comptroller of Maryland; August 2, 1911 – January 15, 1912 | Succeeded by Emerson Harrington |
