= A.M. Kroop and Sons, Inc. =

Maryland riding boot store and manufacturer

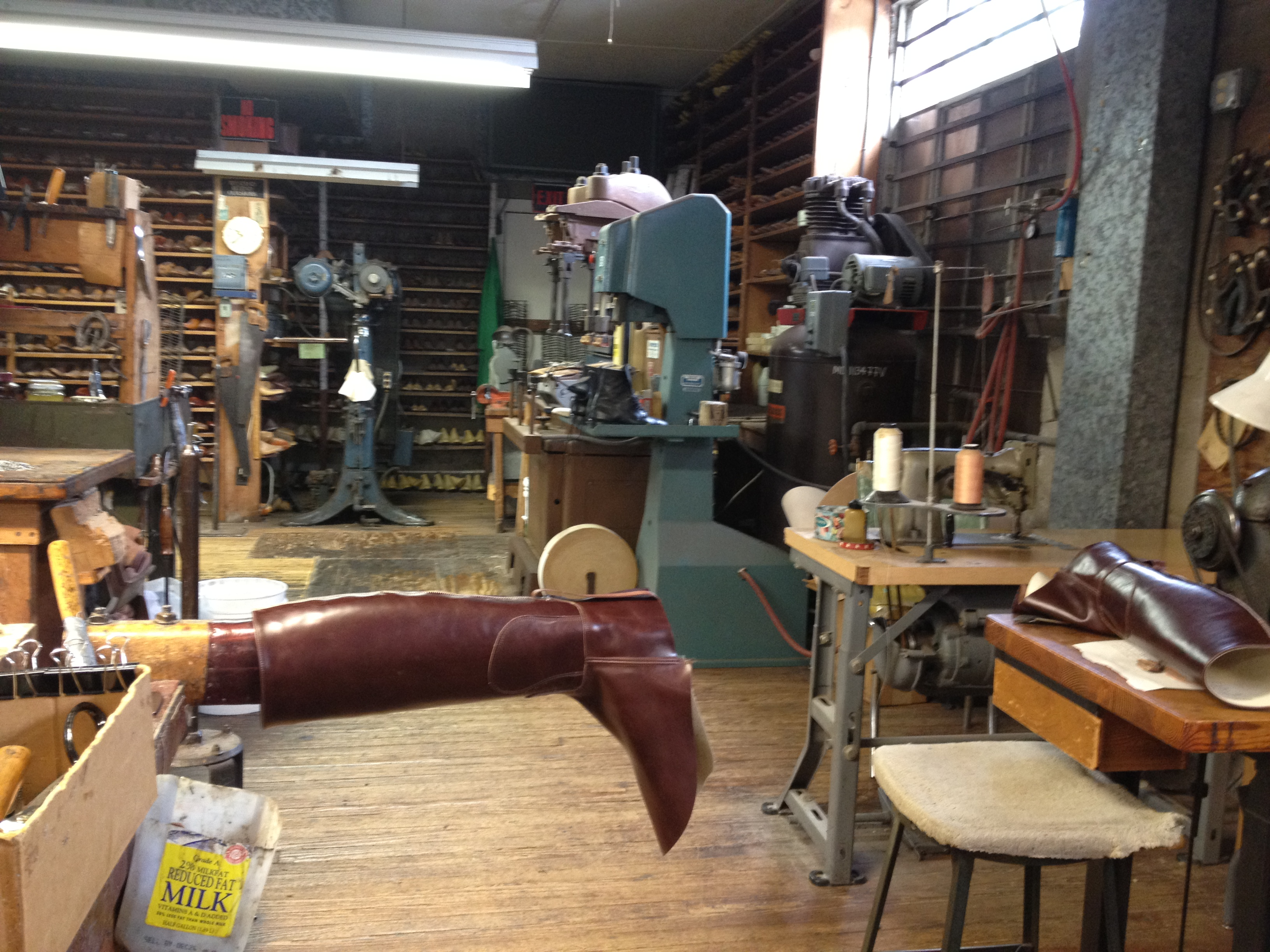
- Founded: 1925; 101 years ago
- Founder: Adolph Michael Kroop
- Defunct: 2018; 8 years ago
- Headquarters: Laurel, Maryland

A.M. Kroop and Sons, Inc. was a riding boot store and manufacturer located in Laurel, Maryland. The business opened in 1925 and crafted boots for many notable jockeys including George Woolf of Seabiscuit fame.

== History ==
Adolph Michael Kroop immigrated to New York from Latvia in 1907 and later relocated to Maryland. He learned boot making from his father who had crafted boots for the Russian army. Adolph opened shops in Ellicott City and Baltimore before opening the Laurel shop in 1925.

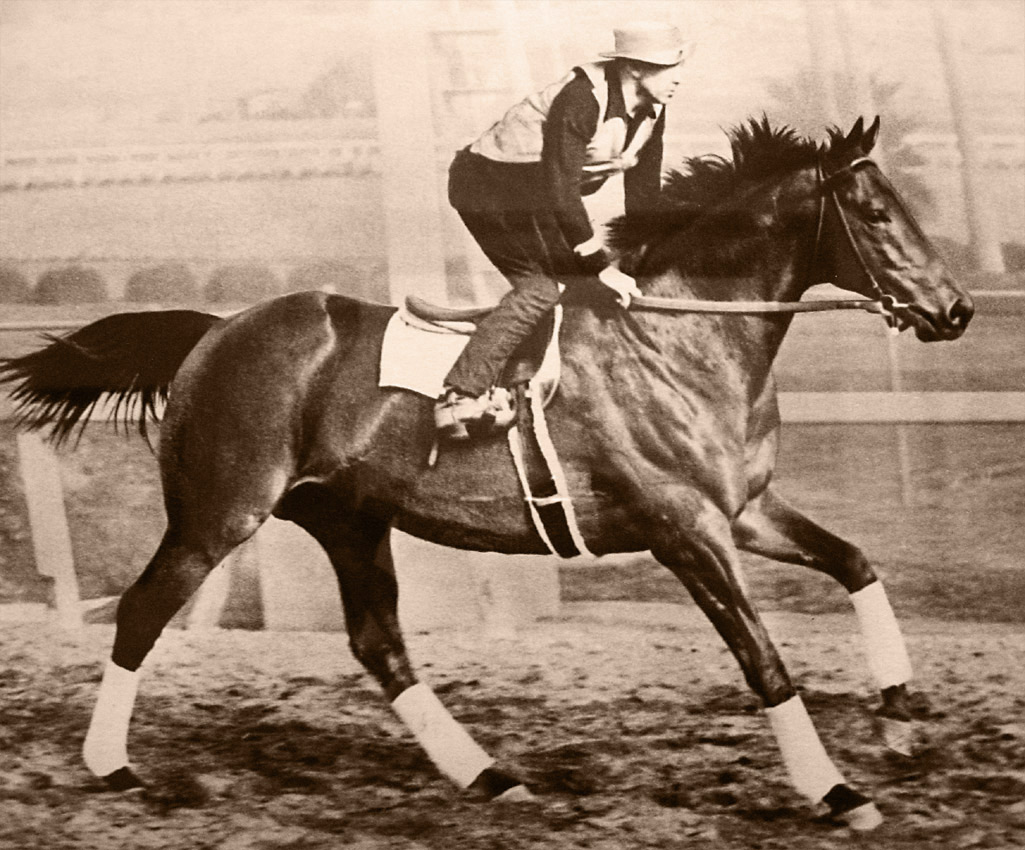
George Woolf and Seabiscuit

A. M. Kroop and Sons proximity to Laurel Park Race Track made it popular with jockeys. Notable customers included jockeys Eddie Arcaro, Willie Shoemaker, William Passmore and George Woolf. George Woolf wore boots made by A. M. Kroop and Sons while riding Seasbiscuit to victory at the 1938 Preakness Stakes. A.M. Kroop and Sons was commissioned to make 25 replica boots for the 2002 film Seabiscuit.

Control of the company passed to Kroop's sons Morris and Israel in 1968.

== Final years ==
Adolph's granddaughter, Randy Kroop, took over the business in 1979 using the same 125-step process that was used by her father and grandfather. The shop's boot makers used equipment dating from the 1930s.

Randy Kroop closed the 2,500-square-foot (230 m^{2}) warehouse and store on C Street permanently in autumn 2018, citing inflation, competition from non-custom makers, and a decline in the horse racing industry.
