= St. Vincent Pallotti High School =

Private secondary school in Laurel, Maryland, U.S.

- Front entrance

Location
- 113 St. Mary's Place; Laurel, (Prince George's County), Maryland 20707; United States; 39°6′27.89″N 76°51′24.94″W

Information
- Type: Private, Coeducational
- Motto: Ad Infinitam Dei Gloriam (For the Infinite Glory of God)
- Religious affiliation: Roman Catholic
- Patron saint: St. Vincent Pallotti
- Established: 1921
- School district: Archdiocese of Washington Catholic Schools
- President/Principal: Jeffrey Palumbo
- Faculty: 27
- Teaching staff: 38
- Grades: 9–12
- Average class size: 16
- Colors: Navy, white and light blue
- Athletics conference: Interscholastic Athletic Association of Maryland (women) & Maryland Interscholastic Athletic Association (men)
- Mascot: Vinny the Pallotti Panther
- Team name: Panthers
- Rival: Archbishop Spalding High School
- Accreditation: Maryland State Department of Education; Middle States Association of Colleges and Schools; Association of Independent Maryland and DC Schools
- School fees: $595
- Tuition: $21,100
- Assistant Principal of Academics: David Tenney
- Assistant Principal of Student Affairs: Catherine Edwards
- Athletic Director: Patrick Courtemanche
- Custodian: Alfonso Bautista Gomez
- Website: pallottihs.org

St. Vincent Pallotti High School, usually called Pallotti, is a private Catholic school in eastern Laurel, Maryland. It was founded by the Pallottines in 1921 and is within the Archdiocese of Washington. It is directly across the street from Old Laurel High School, founded in 1899.

Pallotti is a co-ed school serving young men and women from Prince George's County, Howard County, Anne Arundel County, and Montgomery County. The school is currently attended by approximately 500 students.

The school is noted for its MIAA Varsity Boys Lacrosse Championship victory over The Park School at Johns Hopkins in 2006 and its Varsity Girls Soccer IAAM "A" conference championship victory in 2007. Pallotti is home to the 2014 Maryland Interscholastic Athletic Association C Conference Football Champions.

== Notable alumni ==
- Blake Corum, American football running back
- Keron DeShields, professional basketball player
- Kathleen Dumais, politician
- Jarrett Jack, NBA player
- Ovide Lamontagne, New Hampshire politician, former teacher
- Jaret Patterson, American football running back
- Marcquise Reed, professional basketball player
- Austen Rowland, professional basketball player
- Chase Young, American football defensive end

== School colors and mascot ==
The school colors are navy blue, Columbia blue, white, and black. The Pallotti mascot is the Panther.
