= Laurel Sanitarium =

Laurel Sanitarium for Nervous and Mental Diseases

Geography
- Location: Laurel, Maryland, United States
- Coordinates: 39°05′10″N 76°51′53″W

Organization
- Type: Specialist

Services
- Beds: 90
- Specialty: Psychiatric hospital, sanatorium, women's geriatric care

History
- Opened: 1905
- Closed: 1963
- Demolished: 1964

Links
- Lists: Hospitals in Maryland

The Laurel Sanitarium for Nervous and Mental Diseases was a prominent sanitarium, and later a women's nursing home, and landmark building along U.S. Route 1 in Laurel, Maryland. The sanitarium was founded in 1905 by Dr. Jesse C. Coggins and Dr. Cornelius DeWeese to treat patients with mental illness and addiction. It was converted to a women's nursing home in 1950. The facility closed after Coggins' death in 1963, and was demolished by controlled fire in 1964.

== Operation ==
The sanitarium was founded in 1905 by Doctors Jesse C. Coggins and Cornelius DeWeese to treat patients with mental illness and addiction. The facility sat on 163 acres (66 ha) and housed 90 women patients, two full-time physicians and 42 employees in four main buildings and five cottages. Many dignitaries from Washington sought treatment at Laurel Sanitarium, though most are not known due to Dr. Coggins' discreet nature. One such patient that became known was J. Edgar Hoover's father, who was committed in 1917.

Coggins' first wife, Mabel, hanged herself at the sanitarium in 1931, and news coverage implied she was a patient there. Cofounder DeWeese died in 1934. Coggins' second wife, Helen, was a nurse at the facility when they married in 1941. Coggins was a proponent of families visiting patients at least once a week and by 1950 the sanitarium had treated over 20,000 patients. Coggins ultimately believed that there was only one good treatment for alcoholics, Alcoholic's Anonymous. Each guest occupied a private room, many with personal furnishings and family mementos, thereby creating a home-like setting.

== Early expansion ==
A Keeley Institute addiction treatment center had been operated from the 1890s about one-half mile (0.80 km) closer to downtown Laurel. Built originally as the Brewster Park Hotel in the 1880s, that facility closed after Keeley's methods were found to be fraudulent. It changed ownership again in 1906 and was reopened as the Dr. Flora A. Brewster Sanitarium, though went bankrupt only months later. Brewster was the first female surgeon in Baltimore. Doctors Coggins and DeWeese bought the property at auction in 1906 and moved the building in late 1908 and early 1909 from its 5th and Talbott Street location to their sanitarium's campus off Route 1, where it became a men's dormitory. The move was called "the largest job of house-moving ever attempted in Maryland". The grounds included an area of 163 acres (66 ha).

== Women's hospital ==
From 1950 until operations ceased, the sanitarium was operated as a 90-bed women's geriatric hospital. When the facility closed on September 1, 1963, its 70 patients scattered to nearby rest homes and other institutions. Part of the grounds was sold to the Prince George's County Board of Education and in 1965 became a new location for Laurel High School.

== Demolition ==
The facility ceased operations in September 1963 after the death of Coggins, and the historic structure was eventually demolished by controlled fire in August 1964 to make way for new housing; the Middletown and Avondale high-rise apartments are now there.

Upon his death, Coggins willed his considerable fortune to the Keswick nursing home in Baltimore with a stipulation that the bequest be used to build a rehabilitation home for "whites-only". However, it was determined that the money would go to the University of Maryland Medical Systems as the will did not maintain the same racial clause to this alternative beneficiary.
