= Belair National Bank =

Former bank headquartered in Bowie, Maryland, US

- Industry: Banking
- Founded: April 3, 1964; 62 years ago
- Defunct: January 3, 1977; 49 years ago
- Fate: Acquired by Citizens National Bank
- Successor: Citizens National Bank
- Headquarters: Bowie, Maryland
- Total assets: $21.4 million

Belair National Bank was a bank headquartered in Bowie, Maryland. It operated 4 branches. In 1977, it was acquired by Citizens National Bank.

== History ==
The bank was formed on April 3, 1964.

On January 3, 1977, the bank was acquired by Citizens National Bank.
