= Citizens National Bank (Laurel, Maryland) =

Historic bank

Citizen's National Bank
- Industry: Banking; Financial
- Founded: July 11, 1890; 136 years ago in Laurel, Maryland, United States
- Founder: Charles H. Stanley
- Defunct: September 15, 2007
- Fate: Acquired by PNC Financial Services

Citizens National Bank was founded on July 11, 1890, at 4th and Main Streets in Laurel, Maryland as Citizens National Bank of Laurel. The bank's founder and first president was Charles H. Stanley. Barnes Compton is also identified as a founder and early director of the bank. On April 1, 1965, it was renamed to Citizens National Bank after merging with The Central Bank of Howard County.

On January 3, 1977, Citizens National Bank acquired Belair National Bank.

On September 15, 2007, Citizens National was acquired by PNC Bank and the original building renamed as its "Laurel Main Street Branch".
