= Ivy Hill Cemetery (Maryland) =

Historic cemetery in Laurel, Maryland, U.S.

- Interactive map of Ivy Hill Cemetery

Details
- Established: 1850s
- Location: Laurel, Maryland
- Country: United States
- Coordinates: 39.106°N 76.866°W
- Type: Public
- Size: 10 acres (4.0 ha)
- No. of graves: 3,000+ interments
- Find a Grave: Ivy Hill Cemetery

Ivy Hill Cemetery is on the north side of Old Sandy Spring Road across from its intersection with Nichols Drive in Laurel, Maryland, United States, within the city's historic district. Burials began in the 19th century after the Laurel Cotton Mill reserved three acres in the 1850s for burial of mill employees. The Ivy Hill Cemetery Company acquired the original land, known as both the Laurel Mill Cemetery and Greenwood Cemetery, and added five more acres in 1890. Ivy Hill merged with Greenwood Cemetery in 1944, bringing its size to ten acres. A joint memorial service is held annually by the Laurel Volunteer Fire Department, Laurel Volunteer Rescue Squad, and Laurel Police Department. The Ivy Hill Association, a tax exempt organization formed in 1973, was appointed by the Circuit Court of Prince George's County as the cemetery's trustee in 1974. The organization received a Saint George's Day award in 1981 from the Prince George's County Historical Society for preserving and salvaging the cemetery. The oldest gravestone, for a man named Pritchard, dates to 1867.

== Notable burials ==
- Charles H. Stanley (1842–1913)
