= List of mayors of Laurel, Maryland =

This is a list of mayors of Laurel, Maryland, a city in the central part of the U.S. state of Maryland. Before the city's (nonpartisan) office of mayor was established, a similar role was that of president of the board of commissioners. Officials elected to multiple consecutive terms have the number of terms noted after their names. The term length changed from one year to two years in 1904, and from two years to four years in 1974.

== Presidents ==
Order	Presidents of the Laurel Board of Commissioners		
Order	President	Served	Notes
1	James Curley	1870–1872	Grandfather of James P. Curley
2	James A. Crandle	1872–1873	
3	Walter Brown	1873–1874	
4	William H. Diven	1874–1875	
5	John A. Talbott	1875–1876	
6	Edward J. Phelps (2)	1876–1878	Father of Edward Phelps
7	John Haslup	1878–1879	
8	John W. Whitesides (2)	1879–1881	
9	Lawrence A. Ellis	1881–1882	
10	John Cronmiller (4)	1882–1886	
11	A.M. Bond (2)	1886–1888	
12	Jesse Smallwood	1888–1889	

== Mayors ==
Years per term	Order	Person number	Mayors of Laurel, Maryland		
Years per term	Order	Person number	Mayor	Served	Notes
1	1	1	Judson T. Cull	1890–1891	
1	2	2	Charles H. Stanley (2)	1891–1893	
1	3	3	J.R. Huntt	1893–1894	
1	4	4	Gustavus B. Timanus	1894–1895	
1	5	5	Edward Phelps (7)	1895–1902	Son of Edward J. Phelps; most-elected mayor
1	6	6	Gustavus Timanus (3)	1902–1905	3rd term had a two-year length
2	6	6	Gustavus Timanus (3)	1902–1905	3rd term had a two-year length
2	7	7	T. Watts Byerly	1905–1906	July 1905, completed Timanus' 3rd term
2	8	8	William E. Gilbert (3)	1906–1910	Also served in 1920
2	9	9	George McCeney	1910–1912	December 1910, completed Gilbert's 3rd term
2	10	10	George W. Waters Jr. (3)	1912–1918	
2	11	11	George P. McCeney	1918–1920	
2	12	8	William E. Gilbert	1920	Also served 1906–1910
2	13	12	Edward F. Tolson	1920–1922	December 1920, completed Gilbert's term; also served 1940–1946
2	14	13	Charles E. Little	1922–1924	
2	15	14	Thomas D. Roberts	1924–1925	
2	16	15	DeWilton H. Donaldson	1925–1928	October 1925, completed Roberts' term
2	17	16	James P. Curley	1928–1930	Grandson of James Curley
2	18	17	John H. Fetty	1930–1934	Also served 1946–1948
2	19	18	Julian B. Anderson	1934–1936	
2	20	19	Everard Enos Hatch (2)	1936–1940	
2	21	12	Edward F. Tolson (3)	1940–1946	Also served 1920–1922
2	22	17	John H. Fetty	1946–1948	Also served 1930–1934
2	23	20	Merrill L. Harrison (3)	1948–1954	Also served 1964–1972
2	24	21	Harry Hardingham Jr. (2)	1954–1958	
2	25	22	Hiram J. Soper (2)	1958–1962	
2	26	23	P.G. Melbourne III	1962–1964	
2	27	20	Merrill L. Harrison (4)	1964–1972	Also served 1948–1954
2	28	24	Leo E. Wilson (2)	1972–1978	2nd term had a four-year length
4	28	24	Leo E. Wilson (2)	1972–1978	2nd term had a four-year length
4	29	25	Robert J. DiPietro (2)	1978–1986	
4	30	26	Doris A. (Dani) Duniho	1986–1990	Laurel's first woman mayor
4	31	27	Joseph R. Robison	1990–1994	
4	32	28	Frank P. Casula (2)	1994–2001	Died in office
4	33	29	Michael R. Leszcz	2001–2002	October 2001, completed Casula's 2nd term
4	34	30	Craig A. Moe (5)	2002–2023	Election moved to odd years (starting 2011); longest-tenured mayor
4	35	31	Keith Sydnor	2023–present	Laurel's first Black mayor
