= Prince George's County Memorial Library System =

Public library system of Prince George's County, Maryland

Coordinates: 38.89151°N 76.83866°W

Prince George's County Public Libraries
- Location: Prince George's County, Maryland, U.S.
- Established: 1946; 80 years ago
- Branches: 19

Access and use
- Population served: 909,308

Other information
- Budget: $31,124,600
- Website: www.pgcmls.info

The Prince George's County Memorial Library System (PGCMLS) is the public library system of Prince George's County, Maryland, United States, in the Washington metropolitan area. Its headquarters are in the Largo-Kettering Branch in Largo.

== Branches and offices ==
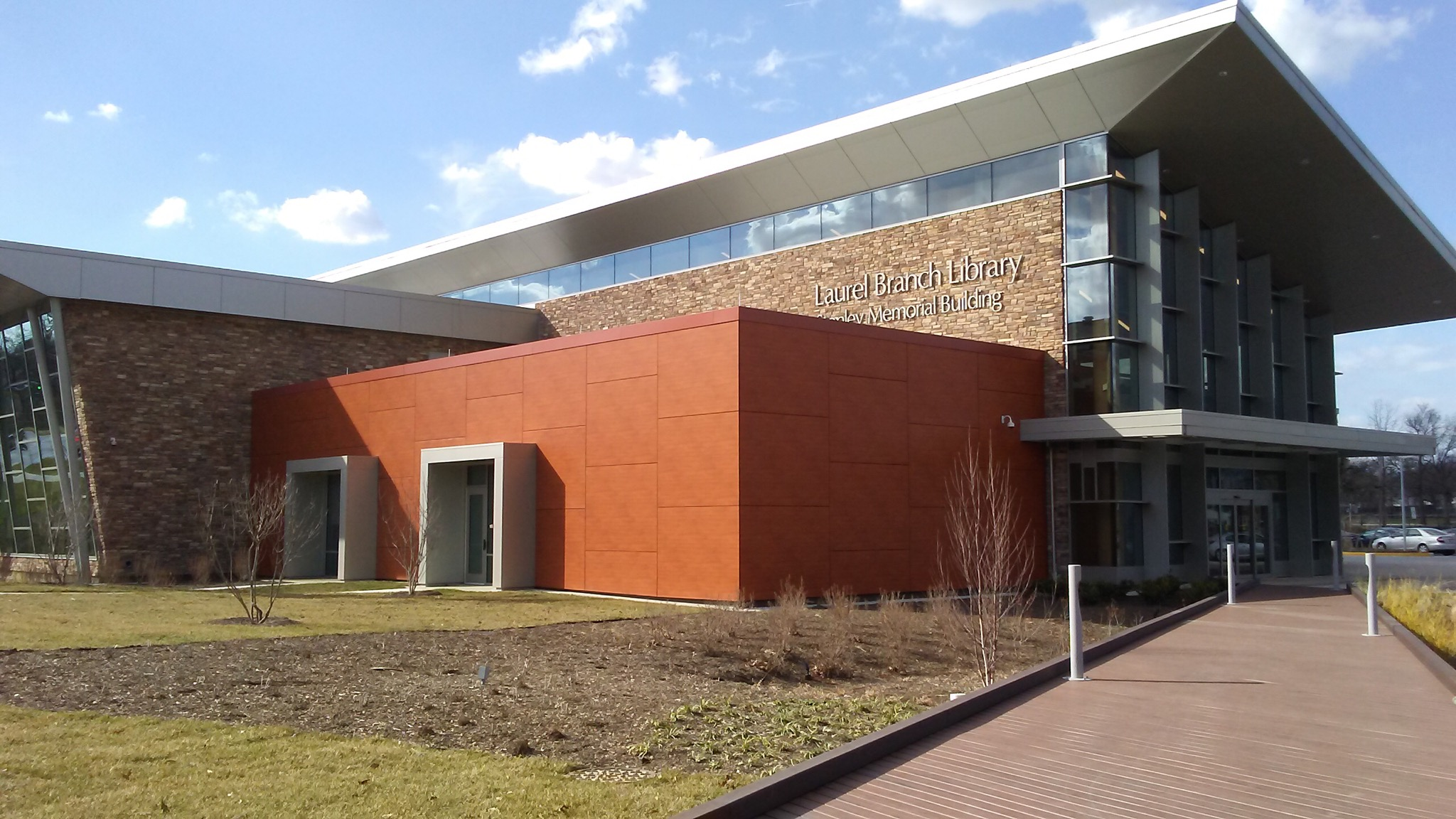
Laurel Branch

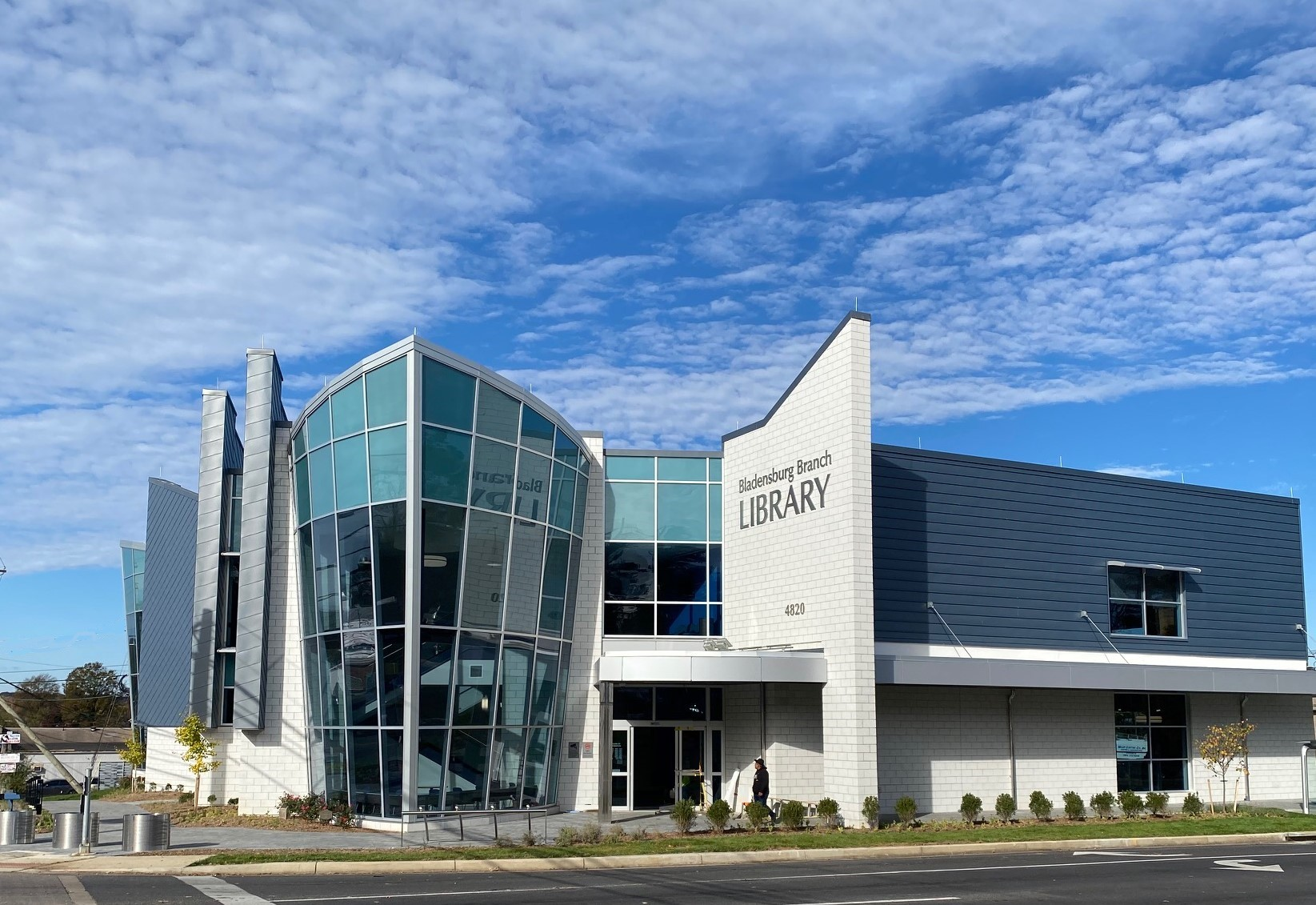
Bladensburg branch

There are 19 branch libraries in the Prince George's County Memorial Library System: Accokeek, Baden, Beltsville, Bladensburg, Bowie, Fairmount Heights, Glenarden, Greenbelt, Hillcrest Heights, Hyattsville, Largo-Kettering, Laurel, Mount Rainier, New Carrollton, Oxon Hill, South Bowie, Spauldings, Surratts-Clinton and Upper Marlboro. The South Bowie branch, the newest library in the county, opened in October 2012. PGCMLS also provides library service at the County Correctional Center.

Previously the library headquarters were in Hyattsville, adjacent to the Hyattsville Library.

== History and organization ==
The library system was established in 1946 "...as a living memorial to those who have made the supreme sacrifice and a testimonial to all those who served in wars." The Laurel Branch was the first library to become part of the system. The first county-built library was the Hyattsville Branch, which housed the library's administrative offices until 2015. In June of that year, the administrative offices were moved to the Largo-Kettering Branch. PGCMLS is governed by a board of library trustees, appointed by the County Executive and approved by the County Council.

== Community programs and services ==
Services offered by the Prince George's County Memorial Library System include print, audio, video and electronic materials; storytimes and early literacy programs; programs for elementary school students, teens, and adults; book discussions; the Summer Reading Program; author readings and presentations; public PCs and wireless access; electronic databases; technology for loan such as mobile hotspots and Chromebooks; outreach services; books by mail; meeting and conference rooms; passport services; and volunteer opportunities.

== Non-resident library privileges ==
The library system is part of the Maryland Consolidated Library System, which provides that any person who is a resident of the State of Maryland may obtain a library card at no charge at any county library or Baltimore City. This privilege is also available to non-residents who work for an employer in Maryland or pay property taxes there. A person may apply for a card from any library system in the state, or choose to authorize a card from any other library system in the state on that system.

Non-residents who do not qualify may obtain a library card for a fee of $50 a year. An exception is made for residents of nearby jurisdictions outside of Maryland who will grant free library privileges to county residents, in which case the library will reciprocate. Thus, residents of the District of Columbia as well as the residents of the cities of Alexandria, Falls Church, and Fairfax, as well as the counties of Arlington and Fairfax in Virginia may obtain library cards at no charge.

== Nearby public library systems ==
- Alexandria Public Library
- Anne Arundel County Public Library
- Arlington Public Library
- District of Columbia Public Library
- Fairfax County Public Library
- Howard County Public Library
- Montgomery County Public Libraries
