= Travis Price =

American architect

Travis Price is an American architect, author, teacher, philosopher, and advocate of green architecture based in Washington, DC.

== Early life and education ==
Price was raised in southern Georgia. He earned a bachelor's degree in western philosophy at St. John's College. During the 1970s in New Mexico, Price completed a master's degree in architecture. He studied the ancient passive solar design in Chaco Culture National Historical Park.

== Career ==
His buildings include private homes, large commercial and institutional architecture, restaurants, offices, housing complexes, libraries and religious buildings which have been built in the U.S. as well as Asia, Europe, and South America. Price has been a lecturer at the University of Maryland, College Park and Catholic University. He is currently the director of the graduate concentration on Cultures and Sacred Space at the School of Architecture & Planning at The Catholic University of America. He has also lectured at the National Building Museum, the Smithsonian Institution, the National Geographic Society, and The American Institute of Architects. Price's firm, Travis Price Architects, is known for its unconventional residential designs.

His personal, cantilevered, four-story steel and glass residence was featured on the Planet Green show, World's Greenest Homes as an example of advanced, environmentally sound design.

Price's book, The Archaeology of Tomorrow, received a gold medal in the Independent Publisher Book Awards in 2007.

Travis Price was elevated as a Fellow of the American Institute of Architects in 2009 for his pioneering contributions to green architecture.

== Personal life ==
Price raised lived in Takoma Park, Maryland for 18 years. He has 2 children. Price later moved to Forest Hills in Washington, D.C.

== Publications ==
- The Archaeology of Tomorrow: Architecture and the Spirit of Place (2006) ISBN 1-932771-93-X
