= Laurel Police Department (Maryland) =

- Abbreviation: LPD

Jurisdictional structure
- Operations jurisdiction: Laurel, Maryland, United States
- Area: 4.33 sq mi (11,21 km^{2})
- Population: 26,000
- General nature: Local civilian police

Operational structure
- Headquarters: Laurel, Maryland
- Officers: 70
- Agency executive: Russ Hamill, Chief Of Police

Facilities
- Headquarters: 811 Fifth Street, Laurel, MD 20707

Website
- Laurel Police Department Website

The Laurel Police Department (LPD) is a nationally accredited, full-service police department servicing a population of 21,945 persons within 3.8 square miles (9.8 km^{2}) of the municipality of Laurel in the U.S. state of Maryland in Prince George's County. The LPD also maintains its own emergency communications (dispatch) and temporary prisoner detention facility.

== Organization ==
- Patrol is the largest and most visible component of the Laurel Police. The Patrol Division is made up of six patrol squads, each of which is overseen by a Sergeant with assistance from Corporals. Officers respond for all calls for service within the city as well as conduct area checks, investigate any suspicious activities, and enforce motor vehicle laws. Motors Units also fall under the patrol division.
- K9 units are assigned to patrol squads to assist with a variety of situations to include narcotics detection and assistance in apprehending fleeing suspects.
- Criminal Investigations Division is composed of detectives who investigate major crimes within the city that require further time and investigation beyond a normal patrol response.
- Community Engagement Unit is the agency's community policing unit. Officers attend homeowner meetings, oversee DARE, and address many other community concerns, as well as monitor speed enforcement cameras.
- Emergency Response Team is the department's SWAT team. The team is decentralized, meaning team members work a normal post such as patrol or CID and assume ERT duties when the team is called to action.
- The Community Action Team investigates narcotics and vice crimes.

== Equipment ==
Officers are issued SIG Sauer P320 9mm Pistol, Oleoresin Capsicum spray, ASP expandable batons, TASER 7, radio, and handcuffs. Vehicles are primarily the Ford Expolorer with Federal Signal Valor LED lightbars.

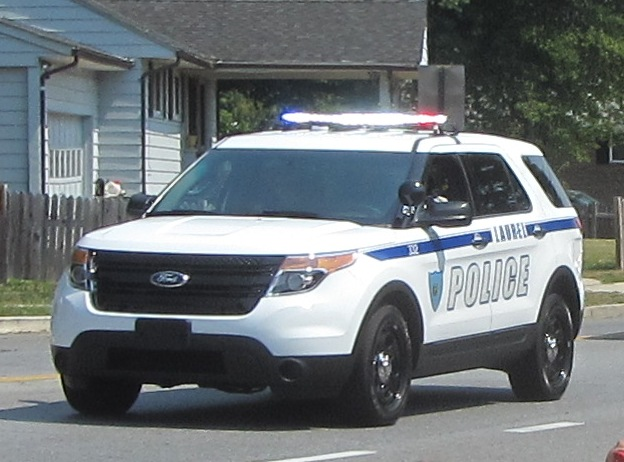
Laurel Police Ford Explorer Police Interceptor

== See also ==
- List of law enforcement agencies in Maryland
- Prince George's County
- Prince George's County Police
- Prince George's County Sheriff's Office
