= Old Laurel High School =

- Laurel High School
- U.S. National Register of Historic Places
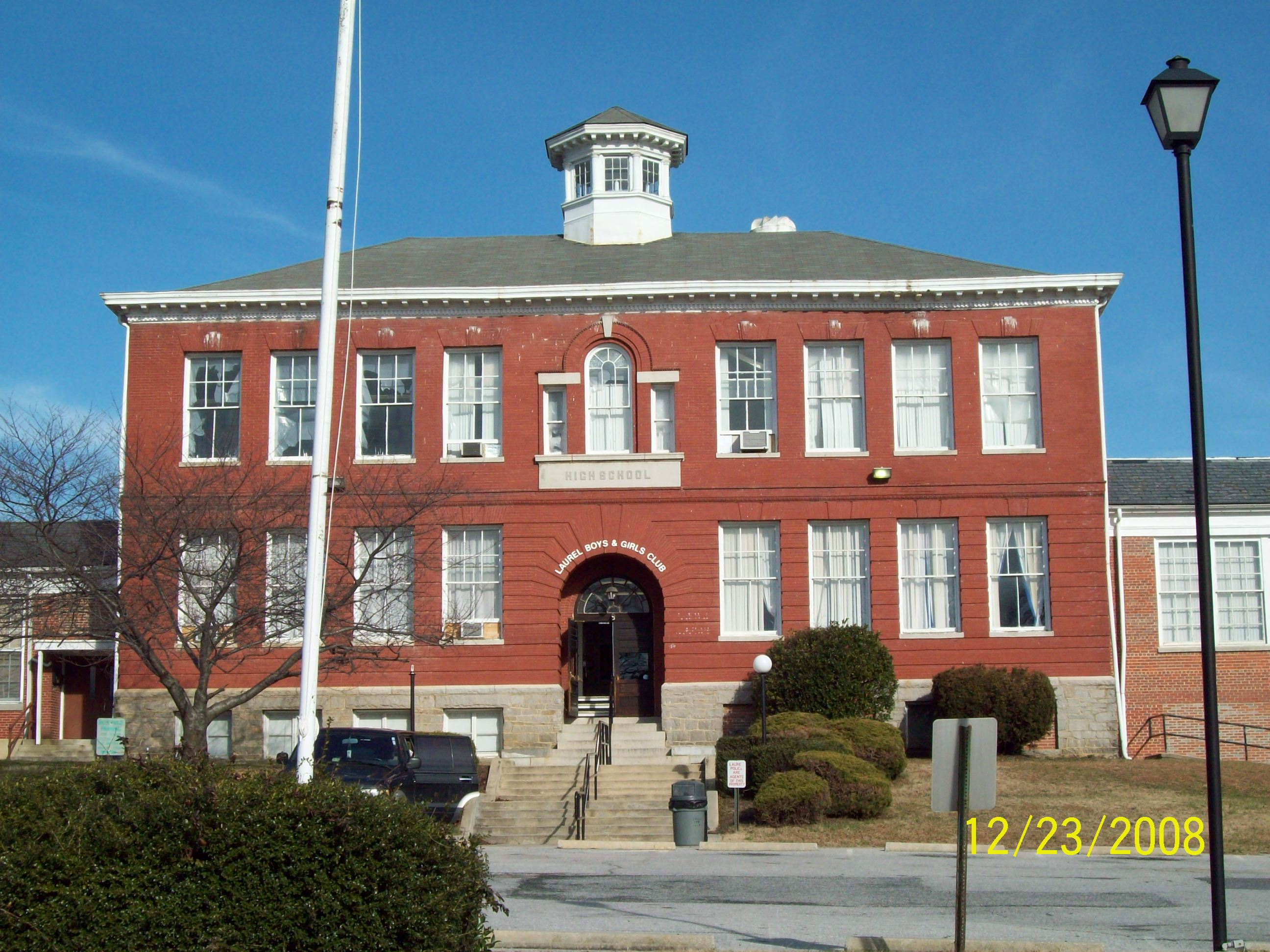
- Old Laurel High School, December 2008

- Location within Maryland Location within the United States
- Location: 700 block of Montgomery St., Laurel, Maryland
- Coordinates: 39°6′25″N 76°51′20″W
- Built: 1899
- Architectural style: Greek Revival
- NRHP reference No.: 79003170
- Added to NRHP: June 27, 1979

Old Laurel High School is a historic former school building on Montgomery Street in Laurel, Maryland. Built in 1899, it was the original Laurel High School and the oldest high school in Prince George's County. The school left in 1965, and the building is now owned by the Laurel affiliate of the Boys and Girls Club.

== History ==
Edwards Phelps (mayor of Laurel 1895–1902) was instrumental in the 1899 founding of the high school, which was also the first high school in Prince George's County. When the project's low bidder failed to give bond and didn't continue with the contract, Phelps assumed the risk for completion of the work at that price, ultimately losing $1,000 of his own money.

The first class had an enrollment of 59 students and four teachers. The 1900 graduating class was all female. In 1965, the high school moved to a larger building on Cherry Lane. The last graduating class at the original location held a 50th reunion in 2015.

After the high school left, the building was owned by the county and named the Edward Phelps Community Center. Beginning in 1974, the space was rented to the Laurel Boys and Girls Club, for $1 a year. In 2002, the club bought the property. It was originally offered to the city of Laurel, but the cost of repairs led the city to turn it down. The club remains there.

The building's cupola was used during World War II as a Civil Defense aircraft spotting station for identifying enemy aircraft. The building was added to the National Register of Historic Places in 1979.

== See also ==
- National Register of Historic Places listings in Prince George's County, Maryland
- St. Vincent Pallotti High School, a neighboring private Catholic school since 1921
