= Dinosaur Park (Prince George's County, Maryland) =

Park in Maryland, U.S. near which dinosaur fossils have been found

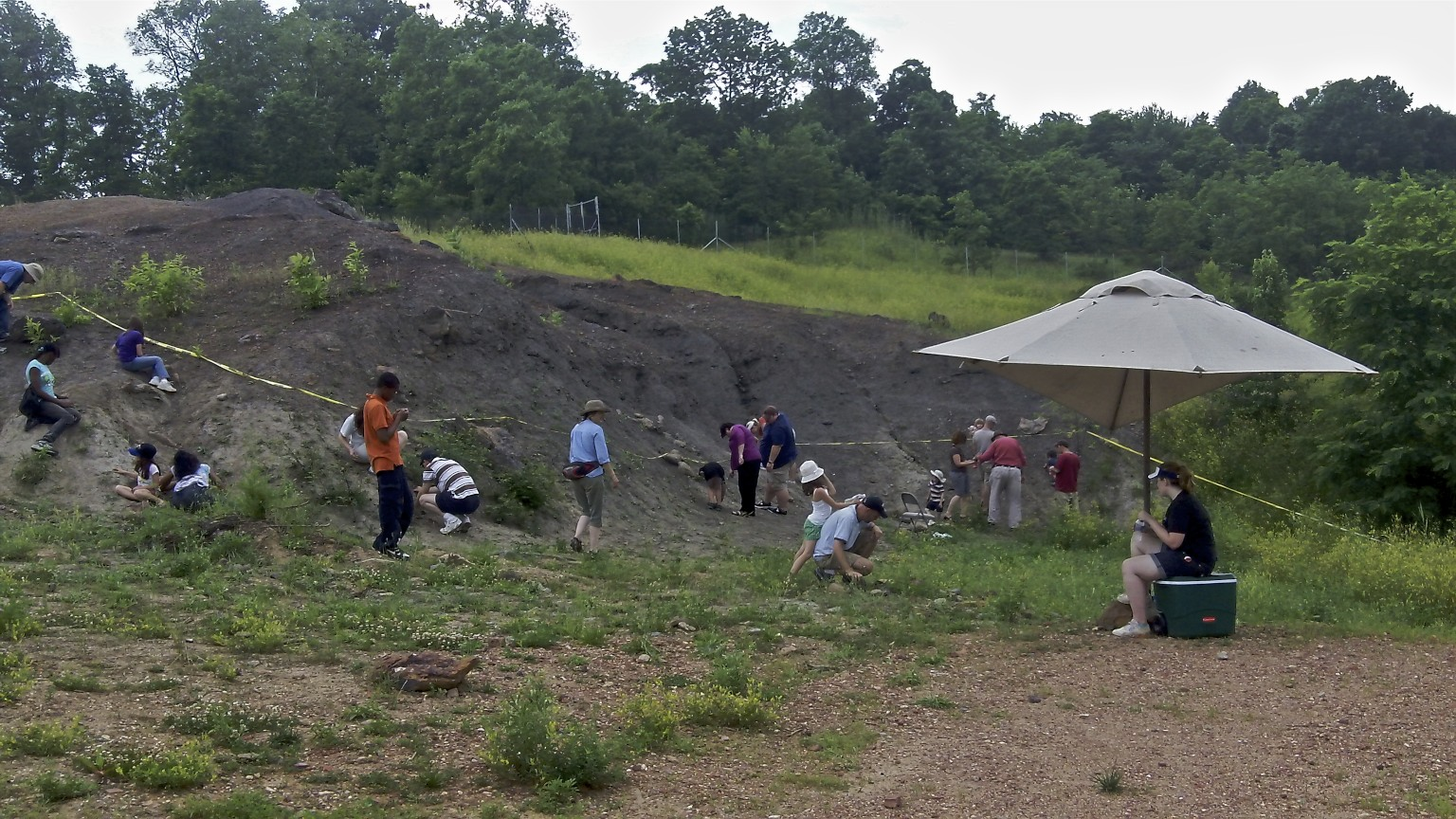
- Outdoor excavation on an exposed portion of the Arundel clays at Dinosaur Park at Laurel, Maryland, U.S.
- Interactive map of Dinosaur Park
- Location: 13200 block of Mid-Atlantic Boulevard, near Laurel and Muirkirk, Maryland
- Coordinates: 39.0708°N 76.8687°W
- Area: 41 acres (17 ha)
- Created: October 26, 2009
- Operator: Prince George's County Department of Parks and Recreation
- Open: Fenced area is open first and third Saturdays of each month.
- Status: Garden area is open year round.
- Website: www.mncppc.org/3259/Dinosaur-Park

Dinosaur Park is a park located in the 13200 block of Mid-Atlantic Boulevard, near Laurel and Muirkirk, Maryland, and operated by the Prince George's County Department of Parks and Recreation. The park features a fenced area where visitors can join paleontologists and volunteers in searching for early Cretaceous fossils. The park also has an interpretive garden with plants and information signs and a Dinosaur Discovery Trail featuring metal sculptures of dinosaur skeletons representing species found in the dig site. The park is in the approximate location of discoveries of Astrodon teeth and bones as early as the 19th century.

In the 18th and 19th centuries, the clays of the Muirkirk Deposit in Prince George's County, Maryland were mined for siderite, or iron ore. Iron furnaces located throughout the region melted down siderite to produce iron and steel used in construction and manufacturing. In 1858, African-American miners working in open pit mines were the first to discover dinosaur fossils in Maryland.

Among the first scientists to explore the Muirkirk Deposit was Maryland state geologist Phillip Thomas Tyson. He brought some of the strange bones discovered in the iron mines to a meeting of the Maryland Academy of Sciences in 1859, where his colleagues identified them as dinosaurs. Paleontologist Othniel Charles Marsh was also interested in Maryland fossils. In the winter of 1887, he sent John Bell Hatcher to search the iron mines. Hatcher recovered hundreds of fossils, including the remains of ancient turtles and crocodiles. In the 1890s, Smithsonian Institution scientists Charles Gilmore and Arthur Bibbins also visited Prince George's County, uncovering dinosaur teeth and other fossils that were added to the Smithsonian collection.

In December 1995, the Maryland-National Capital Park and Planning Commission acquired 22 acres near Laurel, encompassing several Muirkirk Deposit exposure sites. The park protects these sites from development and unrestricted collecting, and provides an outdoor laboratory where the public can work alongside professional and amateur paleontologists to help uncover the past.

== See also ==
- Arundel Formation
