= Laurel, Maryland =

- City
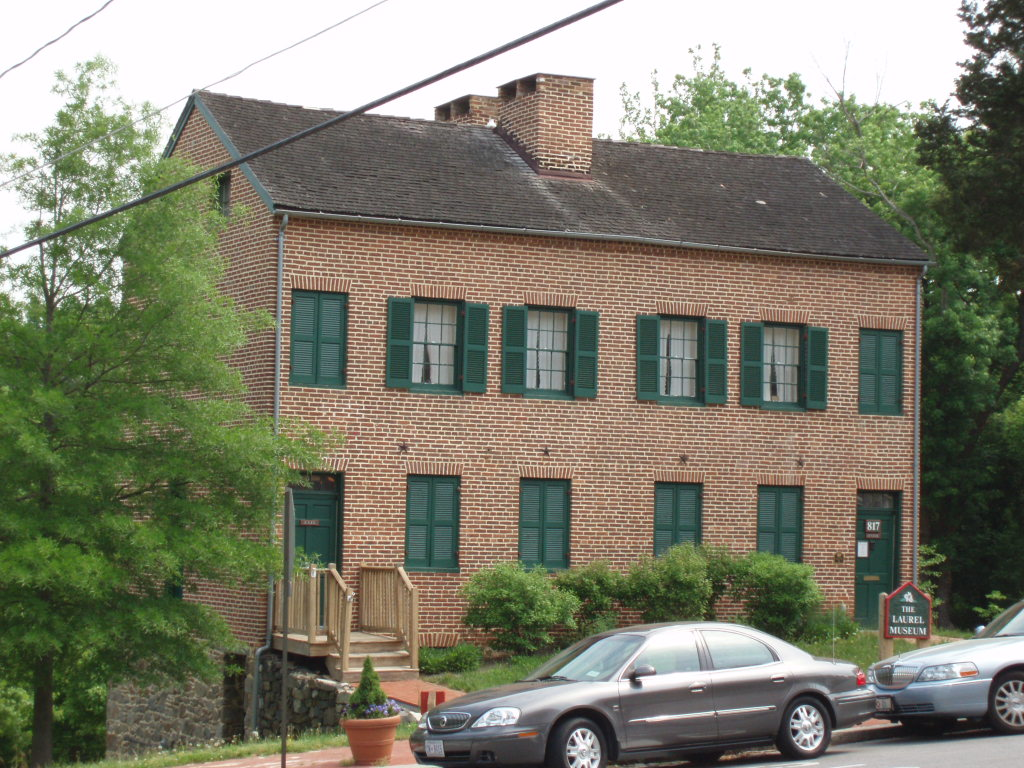
- The Laurel Museum in May 2007

- Flag Coat of arms
- Motto(s): "Progressio Per Populum" (English: Progress Through People)
- Location of Laurel in Prince George's County and Maryland

- Location within the U.S. state of Maryland Laurel (the United States)
- Coordinates: 39°5′45″N 76°51′35″W
- Country: United States
- State: Maryland
- County: Prince George's
- Incorporated: 1870; 156 years ago

Government
  - Mayor: Keith Sydnor (2023–present)
  - City Council: Ward 1: James Kole Ward 1: Adrian Simmons; Ward 2: Kyla Clark; Ward 2: Jeffrey Mills At Large: Brencis Smith

Area
  - Total: 4.84 sq mi (12.53 km^{2})
  - Land: 4.81 sq mi (12.47 km^{2})
  - Water: 0.023 sq mi (0.06 km^{2})
- Elevation: 160 ft (50 m)

Population (2020)
  - Total: 30,060
  - Density: 6,243/sq mi (2,410.6/km^{2})
- Time zone: UTC−5 (EST)
  - Summer (DST): UTC−4 (EDT)
- ZIP codes: 20707–20709, 20723–20726
- Area codes: 240, 301
- FIPS code: 24-45900
- GNIS feature ID: 0597667
- Website: cityoflaurel.org

Laurel is a city in Prince George's County, Maryland, United States. It is located between Washington, D.C., and Baltimore on the banks of the Patuxent River. Formally, Laurel is part of the Washington Metropolitan Area, and its population was 30,060 at the 2020 census. Founded as a mill town in the early 19th century, Laurel expanded local industry, and later became an early commuter town for Washington and Baltimore workers, following the arrival of the Baltimore and Ohio Railroad in 1835. Largely residential today, the city maintains a historic district centered on its Main Street.

== History ==
=== Natural history ===
Many dinosaur fossils from the Cretaceous Era are preserved in a 7.5-acre (3.0 ha) park in Laurel. The site, which among other finds has yielded fossilized teeth from Astrodon and Priconodon species, has been called the most prolific in the eastern United States.

From the Late Glacial age in 10,700 B.C. to 8,500 B.C., Laurel's climate warmed and changed from a spruce forest to a hardwood forest. In the Late Archaic period from 4,000 to 1,000 B.C., Laurel would have been covered primarily with an oak and hickory forest.

=== Pre-20th century ===
Laurel was formed from land on the fall line of the Patuxent River patented by the Snowden family in 1658 as part of the 12,250-acre New Birmingham plantation, which included the later Montpelier. The Washington Turnpike Road Company built Route 1 between 1796 and 1812, creating a major north–south land route. Milstead's Hotel halfway house was built in town to serve four stage lines a day in 1816. Nicholas Snowden built a grist mill on the site circa 1811 which grew to a small cotton mill by the 1820s.

In 1828, a detailed survey was conducted to build a canal from Baltimore to Georgetown to connect to the proposed C&O canal. The route from Elkridge Landing to Bladensburg would have built a waterway roughly aligning with modern U.S. Route 1 and Kenilworth Avenue, with special consideration not to harm the water power for Savage Mill. The project did not go forward; the preference was to build a railroad, the B&O.

Nicholas Snowden died in 1831, and the mill properties transferred to Louisa Snowden and her husband Horace Capon in 1834. In 1835, coinciding with the opening of the Capital Subdivision rail line from Baltimore to Washington, the Patuxent Manufacturing Company was chartered by Horace Capon, Edward Snowden, Theodore Jenkins, W.C. Shaw, A.E. Hall, and O.C. Tiffany and the mill expanded greatly with the addition of the Avondale Mill building in 1844. Mill president Horace Capron with his partners built housing for close to 300 workers, and a bigger cotton mill. Cotton duck from the mill was shipped down what would become Laurel's Main Street, then by rail to Baltimore. A substantial dam was built in 1850. As a mill town, Laurel was somewhat unusual in Prince George's County and was surrounded by agricultural endeavors.

The community was originally known as "Laurel Factory", named for its laurel trees, when Edward Snowden became the first postmaster in 1837. It was a true company town, with a school and shops, and many of the mill workers' homes owned until the 1860s by the company.

During the 1840s, three historic churches in the community—the Methodist est. 1842, St. Mary of the Mills (Roman Catholic) est. 1845, and St. Philip's (Episcopal) est. 1839 —established what are still vigorous congregations.

During the Civil War, Laurel Factory, like much of Maryland, was a divided community, but with many Southern sympathizers. Union soldiers patrolled the railroad, and for a time there was also a Union hospital.

During the latter half of the 19th century, while it still operated its factories, manufacturing played a less important role in the community. Laurel evolved into an early suburban town. Many of its residents commuted by rail to jobs in Washington or Baltimore.

The town was incorporated in 1870 and reincorporated in 1890, to coincide with a new electric power plant and paved streets and boarded sidewalks. By this time, the town had grown to a population of 2,080, and the city banned livestock from the streets.

In 1870, the Patuxent Bank of Laurel was founded on the corner of Main Street and Washington Avenue.

In 1874, a delegation was sent to Annapolis to introduce legislation to make Laurel its own county of 10,000 residents with land from Prince George's, Howard, and Anne Arundel counties.

In 1879, Laurel Academy of Music was built along Route 1. The building was converted to a movie theatre in 1915, with a parking garage on the lower floor of the wood structure; it burned in 1917, and Academy Ford built on the same site in the late 20th century.

In 1888, inventor David J. Weems tested an unmanned electric train on a two-mile banked circular track near Laurel Station. The three-ton vehicle reached speeds of up to 120 mph for twenty minutes.

In 1890, Citizens National Bank opened its doors on Main Street, as Prince George's County's first nationally chartered bank. Charles H. Stanley was the bank's first president, and it remained independently managed and with the same name until acquired by PNC Financial Services in 2007. Branch services are still provided from the original building. Five more branches were added.

At the turn of the century, Louis Barret operated a hotel called the "Half Way House", later called the Milstead Hotel, which served as a stop for the four stage lines operating between Baltimore and Washington. In 1898, a stable fire spread to the 100-year-old hotel and burned adjacent buildings along Main Street. With only bucket brigades, Mayor Phelps telegraphed Baltimore to send a special train with fireman, horses, and engine number 10. One fireman was crushed by the rolling fire engine, and returned in a casket saved from the burning mortuary. The resulting losses inspired efforts to bring water and fire apparatus to the town. The town was struck again by the great Laurel fire of December 14, 1899, when a twelve-building fire destroyed the Laurel Presbyterian Church (known then as Presbyterian Church at Laurel).

Proposed in 1897, Laurel's seven-term mayor Edward Phelps succeeded in constructing the first high school in Prince George's County in 1899, despite several financial obstacles, by personally assuming the financial risks in doing so. The original building, built for $5,000, now known as the Phelps Community Center, still stands at the northeast corner of Montgomery and Eighth streets. It was listed on the National Register of Historic Places in 1979.

=== 20th century ===
In 1902, the City and Suburban Railway with the City and Suburban and Washington, Berwyn, and Laurel railway started single-line electric trolley service.

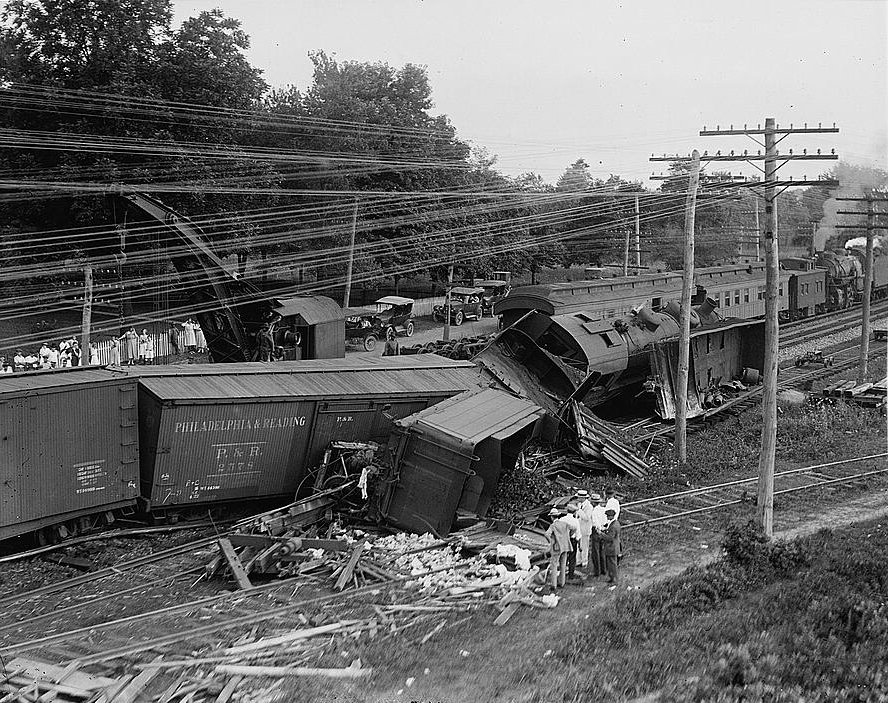
A head-on train wreck in Laurel, July 31, 1922

The Laurel Sanitarium was built in 1905 on a 163-acre (0.66 km^{2}) farm that comprised what is now Laurel Lakes. The facility's purpose was to care for people with nervous diseases, alcohol, and drug addiction. Five buildings that were joined to a central administration building included 8-, 14-, 30-, and 36-room facilities for men and women.

Laurel Park Racecourse, a thoroughbred racetrack, opened in 1911 and remains in operation. In the book Seabiscuit: An American Legend, Laurel is mentioned several times as an important horse racing venue. Laurel also hosted a horse trotter (harness racing) track named Freestate Raceway from 1948 to 1990; it was located in Howard County on the west side of US Route 1, south of Savage in an area that as of 2026 includes a CarMax dealership, Weis supermarket, and strip mall.

In March 1912, the city agreed to take out $35,000 in loans to build its first sewer system, with twelve miles of line that terminated by dumping into the Patuxent River.

In February 1913, Laurel was a stopping point in the suffrage hike led by Rosalie Gardiner Jones. She was joined by a Laurel-based colored women's suffrage group and sent a parcel with a flag and message ahead to President-elect Wilson.

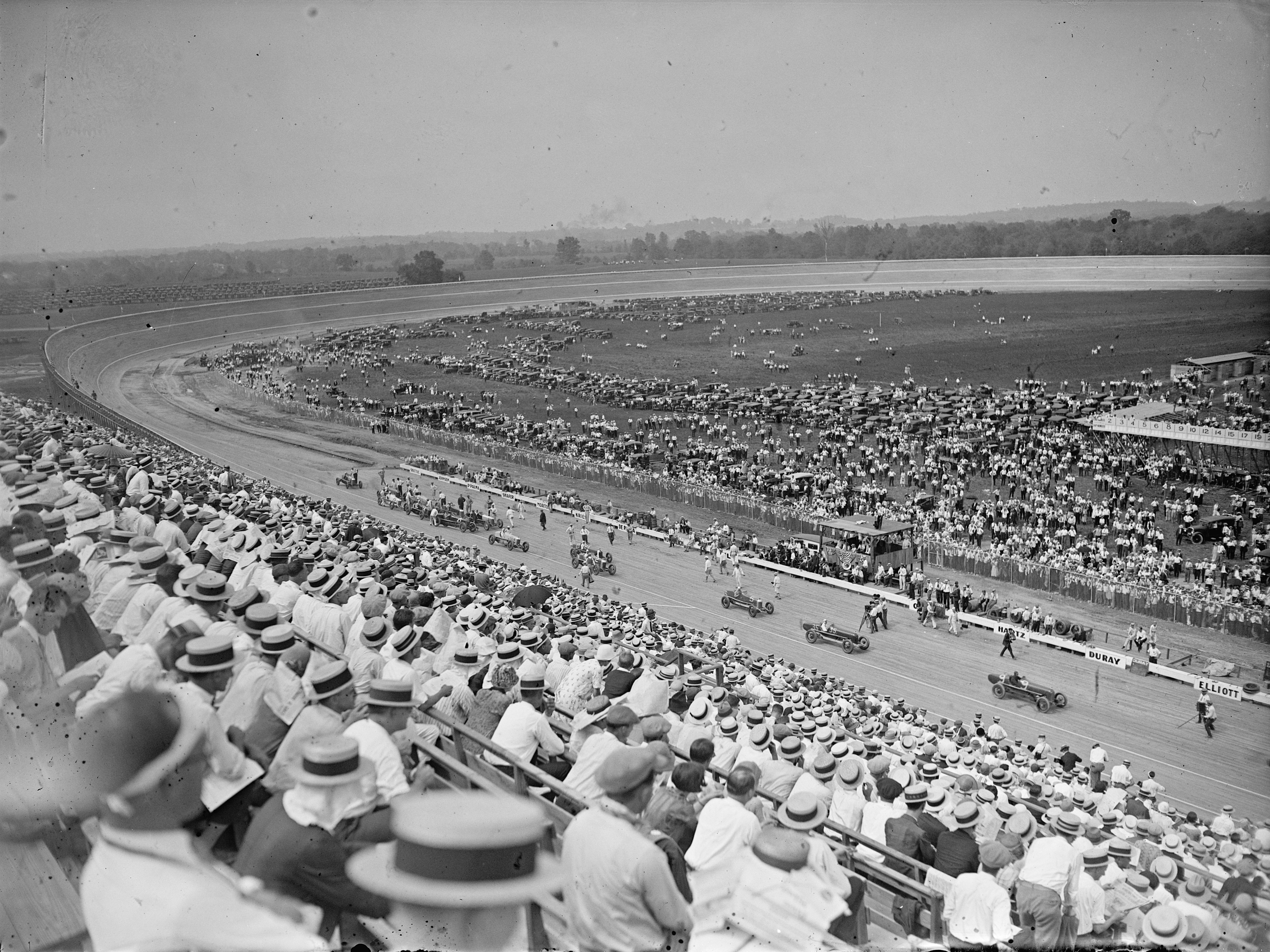
Board track racing at Laurel, July 11, 1925

Board track racing came to Laurel in 1925 when a 1.125-mile (1.811 km) wood oval track was built by Jack Prince and featured 48-degree banked turns. The Washington-Baltimore automobile speedway was short-lived, with featured races of 16 drivers at a time. Despite crowds of up to 30,000, receipts did not cover the $400,000 cost of building the track on the 364-acre (147 ha) Avondale property, which fell into receivership in 1926.

Natural gas service was extended to the community in 1929.

In 1931, "Angy Gerrin" built a 7,000-seat amphitheater next to the Duvall Farm between Laurel Park and Route One for an outdoor boxing venue. His company, Mid City Boxing Club Inc, held several events with low turnouts and receipts confiscated by local police. It was sold the same year to C.E. Cornell, who called it "Twin Cities Arena" or "Mid City Arena". The arena was active through 1932, with the entire delegation of the National Boxing Association attending a fight with Governor Ritchie in attendance. After watching the match and calling a fight to be halted in five rounds, the delegation announced efforts to drop junior lightweight and junior welterweight classes, to discourage matches between young opponents. Operations ceased by the end of the 1933 season, at the peak of the Depression.

Prohibition was repealed in 1934. Wasting little time, the Prince Georges Brewing Company planned a $500,000 brewery on 100 acres (40 ha) next to Laurel Park, but did not follow through.

In 1954, Johns Hopkins Applied Physics Laboratory built its campus west of Laurel in Howard County, using a Laurel address.

By 1960, Laurel anticipated massive growth from Fort Meade and NSA. The town still used the Patuxent River to drain sewage, and filed urban grants for water and sewage infrastructure. 5,000 houses were planned in the adjacent 1,200-acre Maryland City development. City Planner Harry Susini anticipated that the National Capitol Planning Commission would use clustered development to prevent tightly massed population in Laurel by 2000.

In the late 1960s, the county was at the peak of racial tensions. The situation peaked in Laurel in July 1967 when four men and a juvenile, affiliated with the Ku Klux Klan, attempted to burn St. Mark's United Methodist Church and then a private residence in the predominantly African-American neighborhood of the Grove, prompting protests and police blockades. Due to cross-burning incidents, a KKK march, and several arsons and suspected arsons, temporary police barricades were erected throughout late July to prevent white residents from entering the Grove.

In August 1967, it was announced that the city would re-purchase a privately-owned swimming pool, which had been sold to a private club in 1949. The pool, which had only been available to white residents, was to be operated as an integrated public facility open to all.

On May 15, 1972, Governor George Wallace of Alabama, running for the presidential nomination of the Democratic Party, was campaigning at a rally in the parking lot of Laurel Shopping Center, near what is today a Bank of America branch, when he was shot and paralyzed by Arthur Bremer, an out-of-work janitor (see An Assassin's Diary).

On June 22, 1972, Laurel was hit by Hurricane Agnes, which caused the greatest flooding ever recorded in Maryland. Several bridges were destroyed, and the nearby T. Howard Duckett Dam at Rocky Gorge Reservoir was at capacity and posed a huge threat.

In 1975, the city council passed ordinances to create a historic district around Main Street.

In 1982, developer Kingdon Gould III bought 3,539 acres of Laurel property (539 in North Laurel) in two deals for $15 million. The largest parcel lies between Laurel and Beltsville, and is being developed under the name Konterra, buoyed by access to major highways via the construction of Maryland Route 200.

The Elizabeth House, a nonprofit food pantry and soup kitchen, was founded in 1988 to serve low-income residents of the area. This later grew to include emergency financial aid and transportation.

A former 1840s mill workers' home on the northeast corner of 9th and Main Streets was renovated and opened as the Laurel Museum on May 1, 1996. It features exhibits that highlight the history of Laurel and its citizens. A gift shop is available, and museum admission is free. The museum's John Calder Brennan Library is open to researchers by appointment.

=== 21st century ===
On September 24, 2001, a tornado passed through Laurel and left F3-level property damage, including significant roof damage to the Laurel High School and the historic Harrison-Beard building.

On August 29, 2005, Laurel adopted Laurel, Mississippi, as a sister city to help with Hurricane Katrina relief and recovery. In the two years following adoption, "the government, businesses and residents of Laurel, Md. ... raised more than $20,000 for Laurel, Miss."

== Geography ==
Laurel is located on the bank of the Patuxent River, which was the power source for the cotton mills that were the early industry of the town.

According to the United States Census Bureau, the city has a total area of 4.84 square miles (12.54 km^{2}), of which 4.82 square miles (12.48 km^{2}) is land and 0.02 square miles (0.05 km^{2}) is water.

=== Climate ===
As is typical of central Maryland, Laurel lies within the humid subtropical climate zone, featuring hot humid summers (up to 31.3 °C or 88.3 °F) and cool to mild winters (as low as −3.9 °C or 25.0 °F) to with high annual precipitation averaging 80–100 millimeters (3.1–3.9 inches). Laurel lies within USDA plant hardiness zones 7 and 8.

Climate data for Laurel, Maryland
Month	Jan	Feb	Mar	Apr	May	Jun	Jul	Aug	Sep	Oct	Nov	Dec	Year
Mean daily maximum °F (°C)	42.4 (5.8)	45.8 (7.7)	54.7 (12.6)	66.2 (19.0)	75.2 (24.0)	83.8 (28.8)	88.3 (31.3)	86.7 (30.4)	79.3 (26.3)	68.1 (20.1)	57.5 (14.2)	46.1 (7.8)	66.2 (19.0)
Mean daily minimum °F (°C)	24.9 (−3.9)	26.8 (−2.9)	34.5 (1.4)	44.1 (6.7)	54.8 (12.7)	63.8 (17.7)	69.0 (20.6)	67.5 (19.7)	59.6 (15.3)	48.2 (9.0)	38.0 (3.3)	29.4 (−1.4)	46.7 (8.2)
Average precipitation inches (mm)	3.16 (80)	3.03 (77)	4.10 (104)	3.81 (97)	4.56 (116)	4.23 (107)	4.05 (103)	3.43 (87)	4.60 (117)	3.98 (101)	4.21 (107)	3.77 (96)	46.93 (1,192)
Average snowfall inches (cm)	2.1 (5.3)	6.2 (16)	.6 (1.5)	0 (0)	0 (0)	0 (0)	0 (0)	0 (0)	0 (0)	0 (0)	.8 (2.0)	1.3 (3.3)	11.0 (28)
Average precipitation days (≥ 0.01 in)	8.9	8.2	9.6	9.4	10.5	9.3	9.1	7.4	8.3	7.6	8.2	8.7	105.2
Average snowy days (≥ 0.1 in)	1.0	1.0	.3	0	0	0	0	0	0	0	.1	.4	2.8
Source: NOAA

== Demographics ==
Historical population
Census	Pop.	Note	%±
1870	1,148		—
1880	1,206		5.1%
1890	1,984		64.5%
1900	2,079		4.8%
1910	2,415		16.2%
1920	2,239		−7.3%
1930	2,532		13.1%
1940	2,823		11.5%
1950	4,482		58.8%
1960	8,503		89.7%
1970	10,525		23.8%
1980	12,103		15.0%
1990	19,438		60.6%
2000	19,960		2.7%
2010	25,115		25.8%
2020	30,060		19.7%
U.S. Decennial Census

For statistical reporting, the Census Bureau identifies five adjacent unincorporated areas:

- West Laurel (northwest)
- North Laurel (north in Howard County)
- Maryland City (east in Anne Arundel County)
- South Laurel (southeast)
- Konterra (southwest)

=== Racial and ethnic composition ===
Laurel city, Maryland – racial and ethnic composition Note: the US Census treats Hispanic/Latino as an ethnic category. This table excludes Latinos from the racial categories and assigns them to a separate category. Hispanics/Latinos may be of any race.
Race / ethnicity (NH = Non-Hispanic)	Pop 2000	Pop 2010	Pop 2020	% 2000	% 2010	% 2020
White alone (NH)	9,894	6,116	4,943	49.57%	24.35%	16.44%
Black or African American alone (NH)	6,783	12,009	14,846	33.98%	47.82%	49.39%
Native American or Alaska Native alone (NH)	63	73	70	0.32%	0.29%	0.23%
Asian alone (NH)	1,373	2,290	2,458	6.88%	9.12%	8.18%
Native Hawaiian or Pacific Islander alone (NH)	31	14	12	0.16%	0.06%	0.04%
Other race alone (NH)	40	92	279	0.20%	0.37%	0.93%
Mixed-race or multiracial (NH)	531	635	1,143	2.66%	2.53%	3.80%
Hispanic or Latino (any race)	1,245	3,886	6,309	6.24%	15.47%	20.99%
Total	19,960	25,115	30,060	100.00%	100.00%	100.00%

=== 2020 census ===
As of the 2020 census, Laurel had a population of 30,060. The median age was 35.2 years. 21.3% of residents were under the age of 18 and 10.0% of residents were 65 years of age or older. For every 100 females there were 89.0 males, and for every 100 females age 18 and over there were 85.8 males age 18 and over.

100.0% of residents lived in urban areas, while 0.0% lived in rural areas.

There were 12,423 households in Laurel, of which 29.1% had children under the age of 18 living in them. Of all households, 32.3% were married-couple households, 22.9% were households with a male householder and no spouse or partner present, and 37.2% were households with a female householder and no spouse or partner present. About 36.4% of all households were made up of individuals and 7.4% had someone living alone who was 65 years of age or older.

There were 12,964 housing units, of which 4.2% were vacant. The homeowner vacancy rate was 1.5% and the rental vacancy rate was 4.2%.

Racial composition as of the 2020 census
Race	Number	Percent
White	5,518	18.4%
Black or African American	15,116	50.3%
American Indian and Alaska Native	287	1.0%
Asian	2,467	8.2%
Native Hawaiian and Other Pacific Islander	15	0.0%
Some other race	3,761	12.5%
Two or more races	2,896	9.6%

=== 2010 census ===
As of the census of 2010, there were 25,115 people, 10,498 households, and 5,695 families residing in the city. The population density was 5,840.7 inhabitants per square mile (2,255.1/km^{2}). There were 11,397 housing units at an average density of 2,650.5 per square mile (1,023.4/km^{2}). The racial makeup of the city was 30.1% White, 48.9% African American, 0.4% Native American, 9.2% Asian, 0.1% Pacific Islander, 7.6% from other races, and 3.8% from two or more races. Hispanic or Latino people of any race were 15.5% of the population.

There were 10,498 households, of which 30.7% had children under the age of 18 living with them, 33.4% were married couples living together, 15.7% had a female householder with no husband present, 5.2% had a male householder with no wife present, and 45.8% were non-families. 37.6% of all households were made up of individuals, and 6.1% had someone living alone who was 65 years of age or older. The average household size was 2.37 and the average family size was 3.19.

The median age in the city was 33.7 years. 22.6% of residents were under the age of 18; 9.5% were between the ages of 18 and 24; 37.2% were from 25 to 44; 23.8% were from 45 to 64; and 7% were 65 years of age or older. The gender makeup of the city was 47.7% male and 52.3% female.

=== 2000 census ===
As of the census of 2000, there were 19,960 people, 8,931 households, and 4,635 families residing in the city. The population density was 5,280.2 inhabitants per square mile (2,038.7/km^{2}). There were 9,506 housing units at an average density of 2,514.7 per square mile (970.9/km^{2}). The racial makeup of the city was 52.24% White, 34.50% African American, 0.38% Native American, 6.89% Asian, 0.21% Pacific Islander, 2.30% from other races, and 3.47% from two or more races. Hispanic or Latino people of any race were 6.24% of the population.

There were 8,931 households, of which 26.7% had children under the age of 18, 33.9% were married couples living together, 13.3% had a female householder with no husband present, and 48.1% were non-families. 37.4% of all households were made up of individuals, and 5.2% had someone living alone who was 65 years of age or older. The average household size was 2.22 and the average family size was 2.97.

In the city, the population was spread out, with 22.0% under the age of 18, 8.6% from 18 to 24, 42.9% from 25 to 44, 19.7% from 45 to 64, and 6.7% who were 65 years of age or older. The median age was 34 years. For every 100 females, there were 93.2 males. For every 100 females age 18 and over, there were 90.3 males.

The median income for a household in the city was $49,415, and the median income for a family was $58,552. Males had a median income of $37,966 versus $35,614 for females. The per capita income for the city was $26,717. About 4.3% of families and 6.4% of the population were below the poverty line, including 7.8% of those under age 18 and 6.4% of those age 65 or over.

== Economy ==
The Johns Hopkins University Applied Physics Laboratory, a major defense and space research center, is headquartered nearby in North Laurel with a Laurel mailing address and employs more than 8,800 people. Nearby Fort Meade, home to the National Security Agency and U.S. Cyber Command, is Maryland's largest place of employment with a workforce of more than 60,000; the U.S. Army names Laurel among the post's nearby communities. The city's main retail center is the Towne Centre at Laurel, an open-air shopping center on the site of the former Laurel Mall that opened in 2014. The state government says Maryland's equine industry, centered in the Laurel area at Laurel Park, generates $3 billion in annual economic activity and supports more than 28,000 jobs statewide.

Laurel Park, the thoroughbred racetrack just north of the city limits, became the focus of a state-led consolidation of Maryland racing. In May 2024, Governor Wes Moore signed legislation authorizing $400 million in state bonds to rebuild Pimlico Race Course, with racing moving to Laurel Park while Pimlico was rebuilt. The state leased Laurel Park for three years beginning January 1, 2025, at $1 per year. Laurel Park hosted the 151st Preakness Stakes on May 16, 2026, won by Napoleon Solo before a capped crowd of 4,800, the first time the race was run outside Pimlico; with plans to return to a rebuilt Pimlico. In July 2026, the State of Maryland closed on an $85 million purchase of the Preakness Stakes intellectual property from 1/ST Racing. On July 1, 2026, the Maryland Board of Public Works approved the state's $48.5 million purchase of the 229-acre Laurel Park property, to be converted into a year-round thoroughbred training facility.

== Arts and culture ==
=== Arts ===
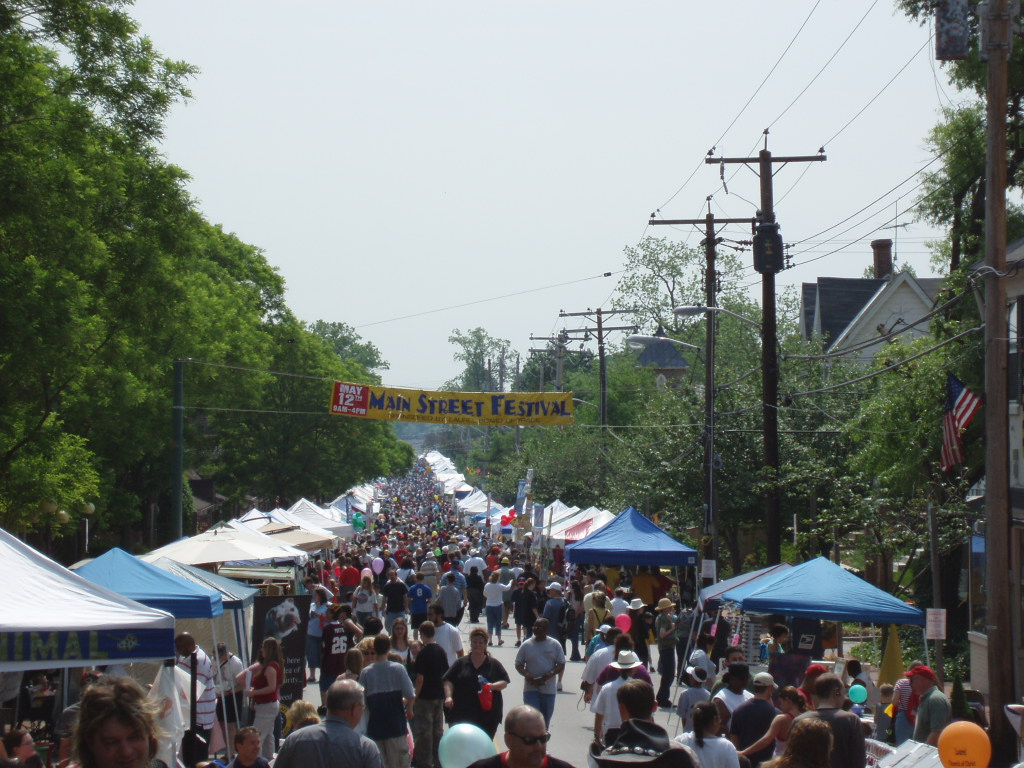
Laurel Main Street Festival, 2007

Local performing arts outlets include the Venus Theatre, Laurel Mill Playhouse, Central Maryland Chorale (formerly Laurel Oratorio Society) and Montpelier Arts Center, which also features an art gallery. Another local exhibitor is the WSSC Art Gallery.

=== Events ===
The city government supports an annual LakeFest in May and Independence Day celebration each July. Since 1981, the Laurel Board of Trade has sponsored a Main Street Festival (held on Saturday of Mother's Day weekend) each May, and since 1995 a RiverFest each October. The Montpelier Mansion grounds have hosted an annual festival the first weekend in May since 1971, updated in 2007 to focus on an "herb, tea and arts" theme.

=== Historic sites ===
The following is a list of historic sites in Laurel identified by the Maryland-National Capital Park and Planning Commission or listed on the National Register of Historic Places:

- Avondale Mill (1844–1991), destroyed 1991
- Pratt truss bridge, built in 1907 in place of a wooden bridge. Linked Dr. Charles Duvall's (1785–1863) mill plantation "Goodwood", later "Gladswood". Was once on the main route for Baltimore-Washington telegraphs.
- Old Laurel High School (original building), now Phelps Community Center
- Laurel Railroad Station, designed for the Baltimore and Ohio Railroad by architect E. Francis Baldwin, built in 1884
- Eisenhower House, built in 1879 and also called "Mrs. Ray's Boarding House", boarded Mamie and Dwight D. Eisenhower in 1919. It is listed on the Maryland Historical Trust.
- Montpelier Mansion (built 1781–1785), a Georgian plantation house south of the city; designated a National Historic Landmark in 1970 and operated as a house museum by the Maryland-National Capital Park and Planning Commission.

=== Public libraries ===
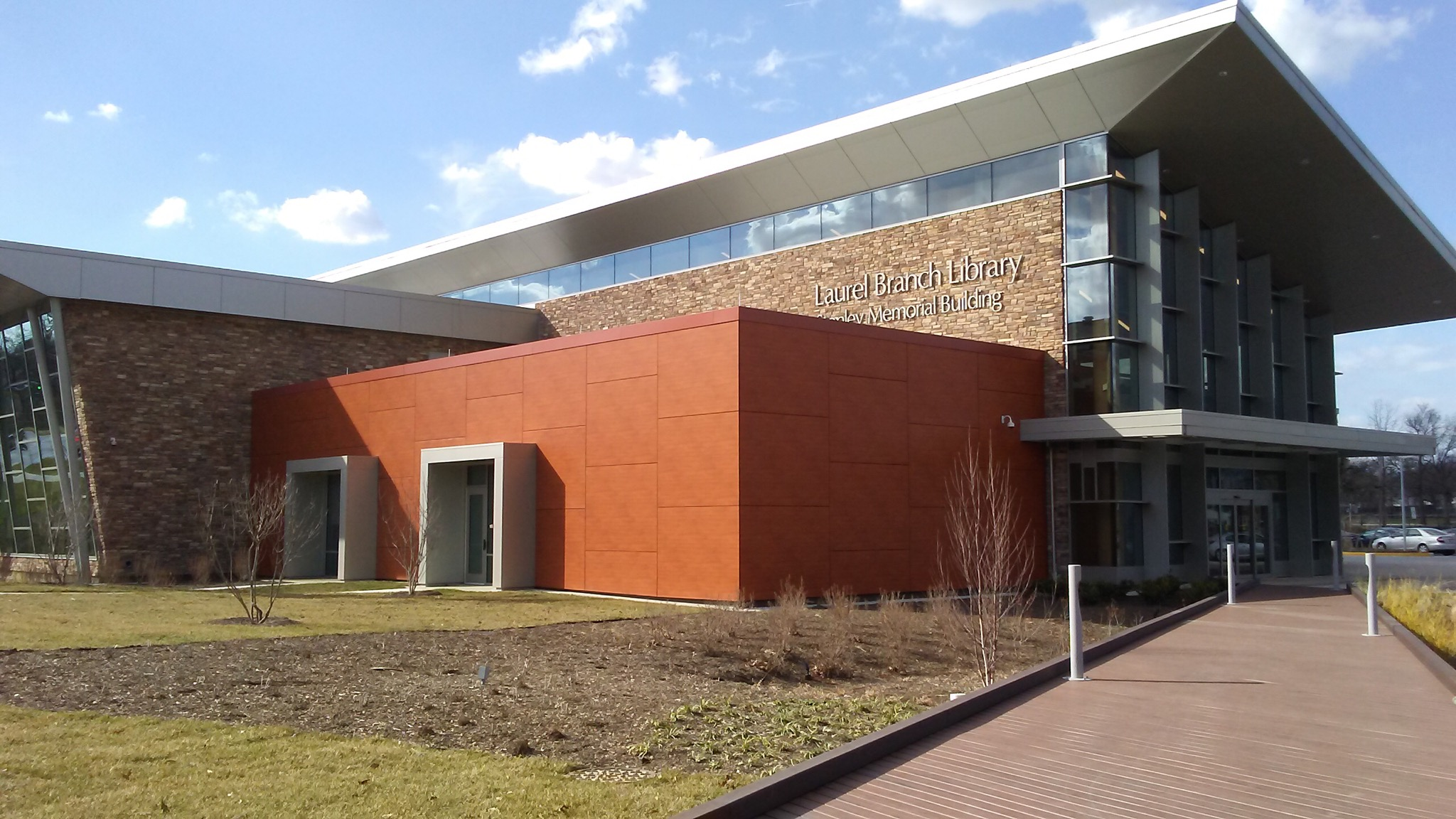
Laurel Branch Library

Prince George's County Memorial Library System operates the Laurel Branch Library.

== Parks and recreation ==
There are eleven city parks, three athletic fields, three community centers, a municipal pool, and tennis courts.

=== Patuxent Research Refuge ===
The Patuxent Research Refuge, a National Wildlife Refuge administered by the U.S. Fish and Wildlife Service, lies between Laurel and Bowie. Established in 1936 by executive order of President Franklin D. Roosevelt, it is the only national wildlife refuge created to support wildlife research. Research at its Patuxent Wildlife Research Center supported the recovery of the whooping crane from near extinction and provided the science behind the ban on the pesticide DDT. The refuge's South Tract includes the National Wildlife Visitor Center, with exhibits, trails, and environmental education programs.

== Government ==
Laurel is governed by a five-member city council and a mayor. There are two political wards in the city. The first ward is generally the area north of Maryland Route 198, and the second ward is to the south. Two council members are elected from each ward, and a council member is elected at large by residents of both wards. City Council candidates must reside in Laurel a year before their election and during their full term of office. Similarly, mayoral candidates must reside in the city for at least two years prior to their election.

Nonpartisan citywide elections are held every two years on the first Tuesday in November of each odd year. The council elects one of its members to serve as president. The president of the city council presides over council meetings and can act in a limited capacity as mayor if the mayor is unavailable. Council members serve for two years each term; the mayor serves for four years.

== Education ==
=== Public schools ===
Public education is administered by Prince George's County Public Schools. Schools located in Laurel include:

- Bond Mill Elementary
- CMIT Academy North – Elementary Public Charter
- CMIT Academy North – High Public Charter
- CMIT Academy North – Middle Public Charter
- Deerfield Run Elementary
- Dwight D. Eisenhower Middle
- James H. Harrison Elementary
- Laurel Elementary
- Laurel High School
- Montpelier Elementary
- Oaklands Elementary
- Scotchtown Hills Elementary

=== Private schools ===
- Augsburg Academy – Christian Day School; age 4 through grade 9
- Faith Baptist Christian School – Pre-K through grade 8
- First Baptist School of Laurel – Pre-K through grade 8
- Julia Brown Montesorri School – Pre-K through grade 3
- Laurel Baptist Academy – kindergarten through grade 12
- St. Mary of the Mills School – Catholic kindergarten through grade 8
- St. Vincent Pallotti High School – Catholic high school

=== Colleges ===
Prince George's Community College and Howard Community College share a campus in Laurel called the Laurel College Center.

== Media ==
Television arrived in Laurel with the establishment of the first TV broadcast stations in Washington in 1946. For decades, Laurel has been served by the VHF TV channels 4 (WRC-TV / NBC), 5 (WTTG / FOX), 7 (WJLA-TV / ABC), and 9 (WUSA / CBS) from Washington; channels 2 (WMAR-TV / ABC), 11 (WBAL-TV / NBC), 13 (WJZ-TV / CBS), and 45 (WBFF / FOX) from Baltimore; plus Maryland Public Television from Annapolis and Baltimore.

Laurel has one mediumwave AM radio station, WACA 900, with an adult contemporary format.

The city had a local weekly newspaper, the Laurel Leader, that ceased publication in October 2022 after 125 years. Its final years were without Laurel-specific news, instead reprinting content from The Baltimore Sun and other newspapers. Final ownership was under Alden Global Capital, a hedge fund heavily criticized for destroying local newspapers.

In January 2021, a local volunteer nonprofit group, The Laurel History Boys, began publishing Voices of Laurel, a free quarterly newspaper with content directly related to Laurel.

== Infrastructure ==
=== Transportation ===
==== Roads and highways ====
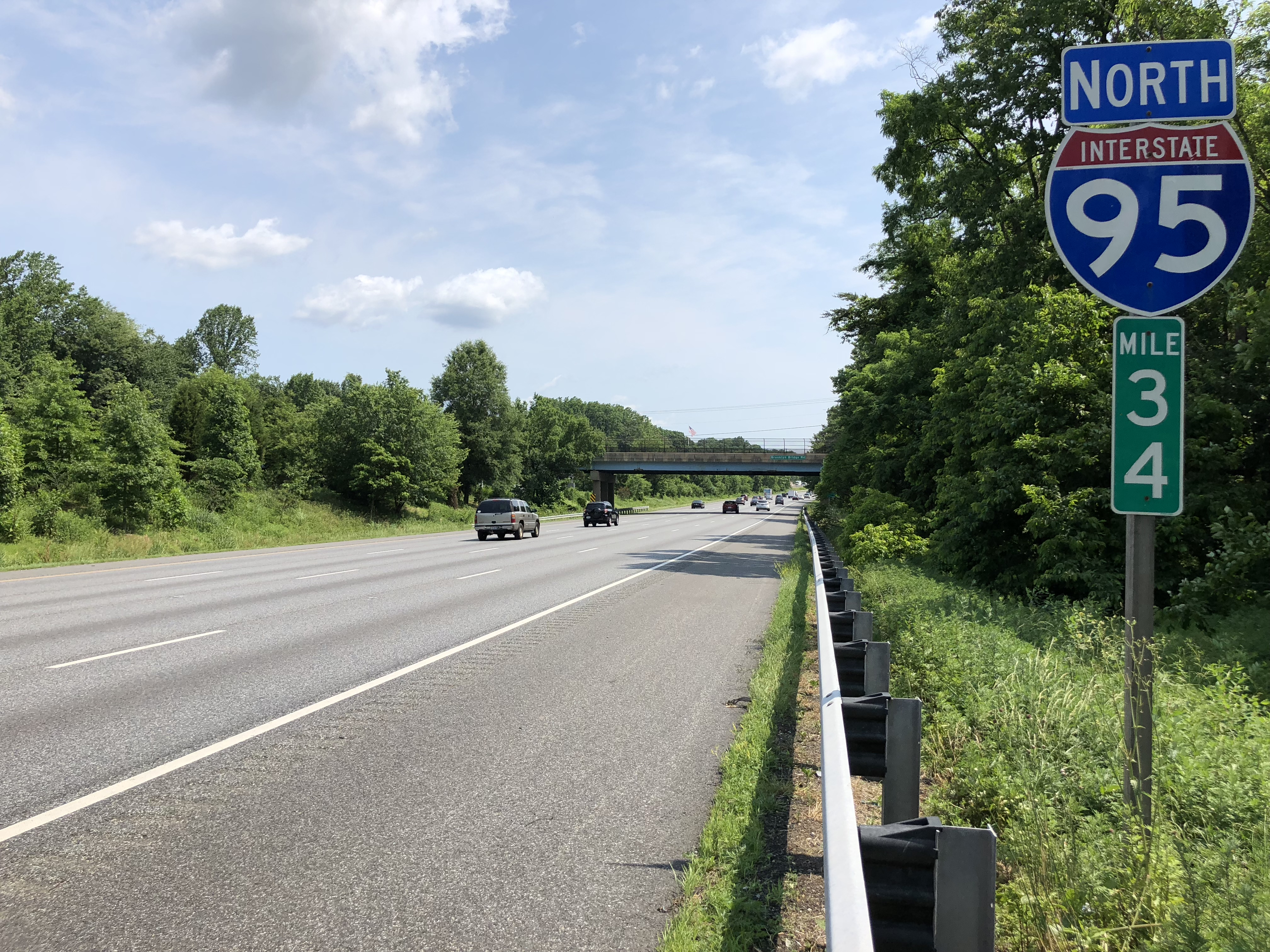
I-95 northbound in Laurel

Highways include:

- Interstate 95
- Maryland Route 198
- U.S. Route 1
- Maryland Route 197
- MD 216
- MD 206

==== Public transport ====
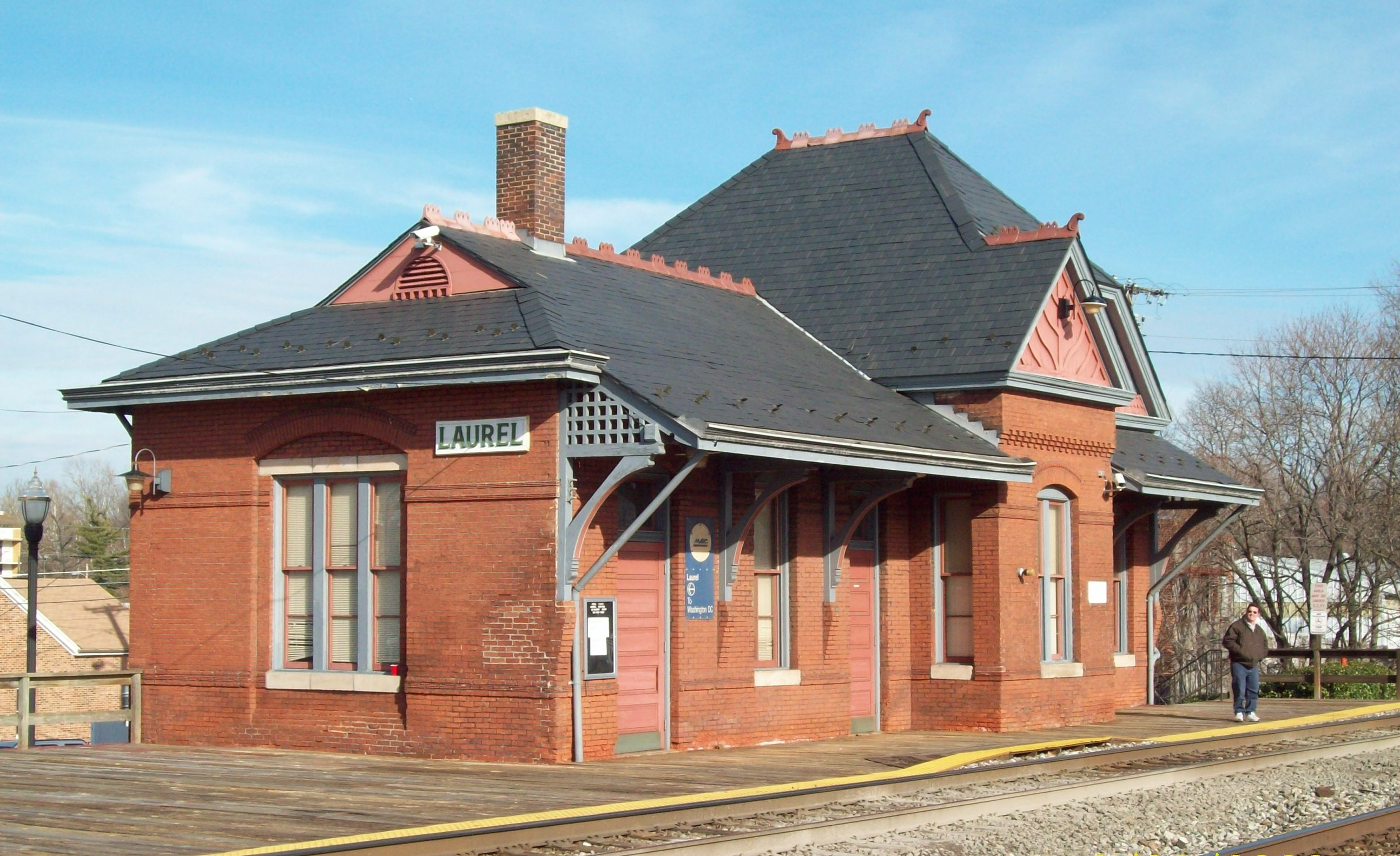
Laurel station

Laurel station is located in downtown Laurel. Laurel Racetrack station is just north of the city limits adjacent to Laurel Park. Both are served by the Camden Line, part of the MARC Train system.

Bus service is provided by the Washington Metropolitan Area Transit Authority Metrobus and by RTA bus service.

=== Emergency services ===
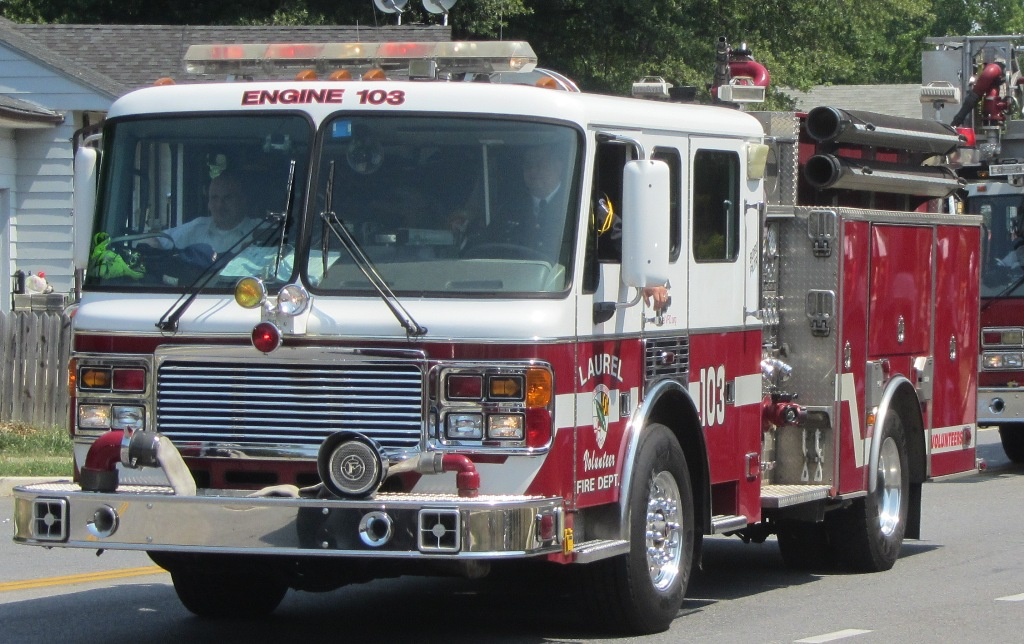
Laurel Volunteer Fire Department Engine 103

The Laurel Police Department and the Prince George's County Police Department are the principal providers of the region's police officers. The Maryland State Police patrol US 1, MD 198, and Interstate 95, which pass through the area, and the United States Park Police patrol the Baltimore-Washington Parkway and its connectors.

Fire protection is provided by the Laurel Volunteer Fire Department and the Laurel Volunteer Rescue Squad, both part of the Prince George's County Fire/EMS Department. The Laurel Volunteer Fire Department was formed in 1902, and the Laurel Volunteer Rescue Squad was formed in 1952.

Ambulance service began in 2006. A paramedic unit is staffed by two career personnel.

The University of Maryland Laurel Medical Center, an 83,742-square-foot outpatient medical center that opened in June 2023, provides emergency services nearby; inpatient care is transferred to other facilities.

== Notable people ==
- Simon Cho – Olympic short track speed skater
- Jim Clash – participatory adventure journalist
- R. Orin Cornett – physicist, university professor, and administrator; inventor of a literacy system for the deaf known as cued speech; lived and died in Laurel
- Edith DeVoe – first Black nurse admitted to the regular U.S. Navy; died at the Cherry Lane Nursing Center in Laurel
- Christopher Emery – chief enterprise architect of the U.S. Securities and Exchange Commission; former White House Usher
- Marty Friedman – former Megadeth lead guitarist; attended Laurel High School in the 1970s
- Kathleen Hanna – former Bikini Kill and current Le Tigre band member; attended O.W. Phair Elementary School in Laurel
- Ernest Lyon – former U.S. ambassador to Liberia, professor at Morgan State University, and founder of the Maryland Industrial and Agricultural Institute for Colored Youths in Laurel
- Andrew Maynard – boxer; won the light heavyweight gold medal at the 1988 Summer Olympics; born in Cheverly, Maryland; moved to Laurel after the 1988 Olympics to begin his professional career
- Greg Merson – 2012 World Series of Poker Main Event winner
- Yvonne Orji – actor and comedian
- Alfred V. Rascon – Medal of Honor recipient; lives in Laurel
- Earl Dennison Thomas – US Army brigadier general; died in Laurel, Maryland
- Ron Turcotte – Hall of Fame race horse jockey who trained at Laurel Park race course in the late 1960s
- DeWanda Wise – actor

== See also ==
- Laurel Mall
- Oseh Shalom Synagogue
- A.M. Kroop and Sons, Inc.
