= Howard Transit =

Public transit system in Maryland, US

- Founded: 1975
- Defunct: 2014
- Service area: Howard County, MD
- Service type: bus service, paratransit
- Routes: 10
- Hubs: 5
- Fleet: mixed variety
- Annual ridership: 885,616
- Operator: Regional Transportation Agency of Central Maryland
- Website: howardtransit.com

Howard Transit was the primary public transit system in Howard County, Maryland, which grew from the former ColumBus bus system in Columbia, Maryland. First Transit replaced Veolia Transport as the operating company in July 2007.

Howard Transit was replaced by the Regional Transportation Agency of Central Maryland in 2014.

== History ==
In 1975, the Howard County Council announced plans to create a subsidized bus system for Columbia. Councilmembers Ruth Keeton and Virginia Thomas introduced legislation for Howard County to manage public transportation with a nine-member board.

== Routes ==
Howard Transit operated eight routes designated by colors to various parts of Howard County and surrounding areas:

Route	Terminus	Major Corridor (s)	Connections	Transfers
Brown Route	Mall in Columbia; King's Contrivance	Little Patuxent Parkway; Oakland Mills Road; Homespun Drive; Guilford Road	Columbia Medical Plan; Oakland Mills; Owen Brown; Snowden River Park & Ride	HT: Gold, Green, Orange, Red, Silver, Yellow; CRT: E; MTA: 150, 310, 320, 915, 929, 995
Green Route	Mall in Columbia; Howard Community College	Twin Rivers Road; Cedar Lane	Wilde Lake Shopping Center; Hickory Ridge; Harper's Choice	HT: Brown, Gold, Green, Orange, Red, Silver, Yellow; CRT: E; MTA: 150, 310, 320, 915, 929, 995
Gold Route	Mall in Columbia; Maryland Wholesale Food Center	Little Patuxent Parkway; Kilimanjaro Road; Tamar Drive; Waterloo Road	Columbia Medical Plan; Oakland Mills; Longwood Apartments; Long Reach; Columbia Crossing; Snowden River Park & Ride; Sherwood Crossing	HT: Brown, Green, Orange, Purple, Red, Silver, Yellow; CRT: E; MTA: 150, 310, 320, 915, 929, 995
Orange Route	Mall in Columbia; King's Contrivance	Little Patuxent Parkway; Sunny Springs Lane; Cedar Lane; Shaker Drive; Guilford Road	Old Columbia Road; Atholton Shopping Center; Hickory Ridge Place; Howard Community College; Howard County General Hospital	HT: Brown, Gold, Green, Red, Silver, Yellow; CRT: E; MTA: 150, 310, 320, 915, 929
Purple Route	Towne Centre at Laurel; Elkridge	Washington Boulevard	Savage; Maryland Wholesale Food Center; Meadowridge Road; Dorsey	HT: Gold, Silver; CRT: A, B, C, D, E, F, G, H, J; MTA: 202, 320; Metrobus: 87, 88, 89, 89M, Z9, Z29; MARC: Camden Line
Red Route	Mall in Columbia; Columbia Gateway	Little Patuxent Parkway; Maryland Route 175; Tamar Drive; Dobbin Road; Robin Fulton Drive	Longwood Apartments; Long Reach; Columbia Crossing; Dobbin Shopping Center; Snowden Square	HT: Brown, Gold, Green, Orange, Silver, Yellow; CRT: E; MTA: 150, 310, 320, 915, 929, 995
Silver Route	Mall in Columbia; BWI Thurgood Marshall Airport	Broken Land Parkway; Snowden River Parkway*Waterloo Road; Washington Boulevard; Maryland Route 100; Aviation Boulevard	Owen Brown; Broken Land Park & Ride; Snowden Square; Maryland Wholesale Food Center; Meadowridge Road; Dorsey; BWI Rail Station; Arundel Mills Mall	HT: Brown, Gold, Green, Orange, Purple, Red, Yellow; CRT: E, J, K; MTA: 17, 99, 150, 201, 310, 320, 915, 929, 995; Blue Line; Metrobus; B30; MARC; Camden Line; Penn Line
Yellow Route	Mall in Columbia; Ellicott City	Little Patuxent Parkway; Columbia Road; Clarksville Pike/Old Annapolis Road; Maryland Route 100; Montgomery Road; Rogers Avenue; U.S. Route 40	Dorsey's Search/Selbourne House; Executive Park; Long Gate Park & Ride; Long Gate; Main Street & Ellicott Mills; Howard County Government Center; U.S. Route 40 & Rogers Avenue; Heartlands	HT: Brown, Gold, Green, Orange, Red, Silver; CRT: E; MTA: 150, 310, 320, 915, 929, 995

Notes:

- Transfers:
  - Blue Line = Baltimore Light Rail (operated by MTA Maryland)
  - CRT = Connect-a-Ride
  - HT = Howard Transit
  - MARC = Maryland Area Regional Commuter (operated by MTA Maryland)
  - Metrobus = Metrobus (operated by WMATA)
  - MTA = Maryland Transit Administration or MTA Maryland
- All routes except Purple Route have connection to the Mall in Columbia. The Purple Route meets the Gold and Silver Routes at the Maryland Food Center. The Red, Silver, and Brown Routes all meet at Snowden Square shopping center in east Columbia.

== Defunct routes ==
- Blue Route -- traveled from Clarksville to the Mall in Columbia. Service eliminated as of July 9, 2010.
