= Regional Transportation Agency of Central Maryland =

Regional Transportation Agency of Central Maryland (RTA)

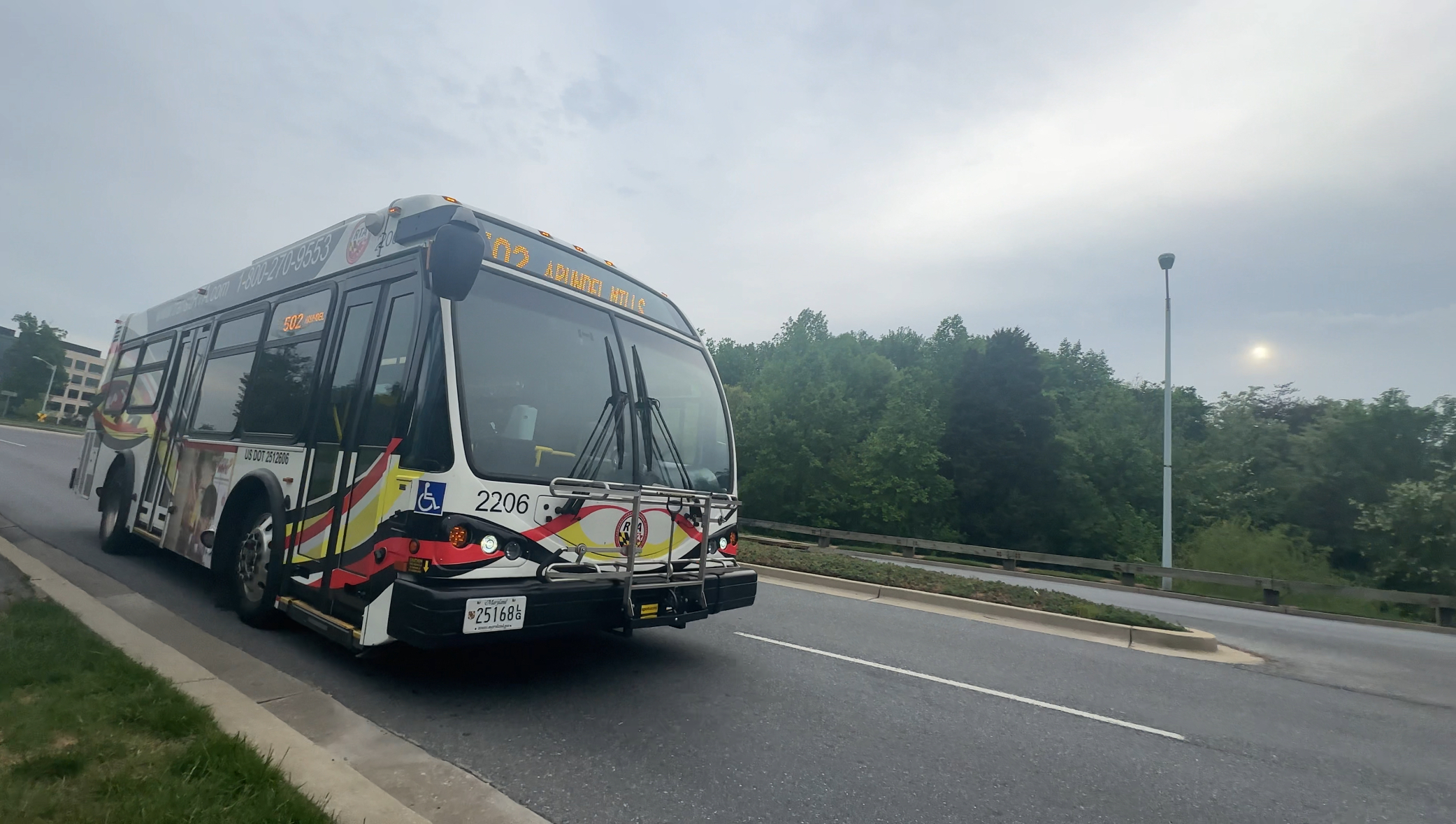
- A Central MD RTA bus in Jessup heading north to Arundel Mills Mall 2602 ex 26908 testing at laurel
- Founded: July 1, 2014
- Commenced operation: July 1, 2014
- Locale: 8510 Corridor Road, Suite 110, Savage, Maryland 20763
- Service area: Anne Arundel, Howard County, City of Laurel, Northern Prince George's County, and Baltimore County
- Service type: Fixed-route, Paratransit
- Routes: 16
- Annual ridership: 1,021,870 (FY2025)
- Fuel type: Diesel, gas, electric
- Operator: Transdev
- General Manager: Jason Quan
- Website: http://www.transitRTA.com

The Regional Transportation Agency of Central Maryland, locally referred to as the RTA, is a transit organization providing fixed-route and paratransit services across Central Maryland. The RTA is made up of multiple jurisdictions including Anne Arundel County, Howard County, the City of Laurel, Northern Prince George's County, and Baltimore County.

== History ==
In 2014, Howard County initiated the Regional Transit Agency of Central Maryland, recruiting Anne Arundel County to join areas served by Central Maryland Regional Transit claiming the centralized authority initiated, managed and funded through Howard County would save money in contract expenses. CMRT bid on providing services to these regions after July 1, but lost to First Transit.

In 2014, Howard County broke ground on a $7.2 million bus depot at Savage, Maryland designed to house 120 buses.

In 2023, RTA added route 505, the first route to serve Baltimore County.

In October 2023, RTA released the final draft of the Central Maryland Transit Development Plan (TDP), proposing future changes and improvements to RTA bus service between fiscal years 2024 and 2028.

== Fares ==
Bus fare is $2.00 or purchase on the Transit app.

== Routes ==
As of August 2026, RTA operates 14 bus routes in Howard County, Anne Arundel County, Prince George's County, the city of Laurel, and Baltimore County. Most routes operate daily service unless otherwise noted.

300-Series routes (Prince George's County) In 2028 Route 301 will be extended to Bowie state university making stops along MD197

| Route | Name | Terminals | | Areas served | Service | Headway | Notes |
|---|---|---|---|---|---|---|---|
| 301 | South Laurel | Towne Centre Laurel | South Laurel Drive | Laurel | Weekday service only | 60 min | |
| 302 | Greenbelt Metro Station | Towne Centre Laurel | Greenbelt Metro Station | Laurel; Beltsville; Greenbelt | Weekday and Weekend service | 60 min | |

=== 400-Series routes (Howard County) ===
In 2023, an extension to Route 409 from Elkridge to Lansdowne and Halethorpe was proposed but it was delayed until 2026/2027

| Route | Name | Terminals | | Areas served | Service | Headway | Notes |
|---|---|---|---|---|---|---|---|
| 401 | Harper's Choice / Clary's Forest | Mall in Columbia | Clary's Forest | Harper's Choice Village Center; Wilde Lake Village Center; Howard County General Hospital; Howard Community College | | Weekdays and Saturdays: 30 min (until 6 PM); 60 min (evenings); Sundays: 60 min | |
| 403 | Executive Park Drive | Mall in Columbia | Columbia 100 Parkway | Dorsey's Search | | 60 min | |
| 404 | Hickory Ridge | Mall in Columbia | Hickory Ridge Village Center | King's Contrivance; Hickory Ridge; Howard County General Hospital; Howard Community College | | 60 min | |
| 405 | Ellicott City | Ellicott City Walmart | Pine Orchard Lane | Long Gate; Ellicott City | RTA 505 | No Sunday service, 60 min | |
| 407 | Owen Brown / Kings Contrivance | Mall in Columbia | King's Contrivance Village Center | Owen Brown; Oakland Mills; King's Contrivance | | 60 min | |
| 408 | Lark Brown / Waterloo | Mall in Columbia | Waterloo Park | Long Reach; Owen Brown; East Columbia/Columbia Gateway Office Park; Waterloo | | 60 min | |
| 409 | Elkridge Corners | Towne Centre Laurel | Elkridge | Elkridge; Jessup; Savage; Laurel | No Sunday service | 60 min | |

=== 500-Series regional routes ===
The 501 is Proposed to start running to BWI airport in mid to late 2026

| Route | Name | Terminals | | Areas served | Service | Headway | Notes |
|---|---|---|---|---|---|---|---|
| 501 | Columbia / Arundel Mills | Mall in Columbia | Arundel Mills | Jessup; South Elkridge | | 60 min | Highest ridership route system wide. |
| 502 | Laurel / Arundel Mills | Towne Centre Laurel | Arundel Mills | Laurel; Maryland City | | Weekdays: 60 min (until 7 PM); 120 min After 7PM; Weekends: 120 min | Only route to have a 120-minute headway. |
| 503 | Laurel / Columbia | Mall in Columbia | Towne Centre Laurel | Laurel; Savage; Owen Brown | No Sunday service | 60 min | |
| 505 | Columbia / Catonsville | Mall in Columbia | Catonsville Walmart | Columbia; Ellicott City; Catonsville | | 60 min | |

== Hubs ==
RTA has a number of transit hubs where numerous bus lines meet. They include:

- Arundel Mills
- Mall in Columbia
- Towne Centre at Laurel

== Active Fixed-route fleet ==
(As of October 2026)

| Model | Fleet number | Quantity | Notes |
|---|---|---|---|
| 2017 Eldorado EZ Rider 32' BRT | 1704-1710 | 7 | 1708 retired Bus 1706 Eldorado EZ rider II |
| 2018 Eldorado EZ Rider 32' BRT | 1801-1806 | 6 | Bus 1804 Eldorado EZ rider II 1806 retired |
| 2019 Eldorado EZ rider 32' BRT | 1901-1902 | 2 | Bus 1901 Eldorado EZ rider II |
| 2022 Eldorado EZ Rider 32' BRT | 2201-2211 | 11 | 2022 Eldorado Buses (2211 the bus on the left and 2202 is the bus on the right) |
| 2023 Eldorado EZ Rider 32' BRT | 2301-2302 | 2 | 2302 Parked at the Mall In Columbia operating the 501 to Arundel Mills |
| 2024 Eldorado EZ Rider 32' BRT | 72924-73224 | 4 | 73124 parked at the Mall In Columbia |
| 2026 Gillig low floor 30' | 2601 to 2607 | 7 | 2602 ex 26908 testing at laurel As of 11/15/26 2601 and 2602 are in service |

== Active Paratransit/ Light duty fleet ==
(As of July 29, 2026)

| Model | Fleet number | Quantity | Notes |
|---|---|---|---|
| 2014 C&E Phoenix 25ft Ford Cutaway | 200-204 | 5 | Bus 200 on layover at Laurel on the 503 |
| 2015 C&E Phoenix 25ft Ford Cutaway | 205-212 | 8 | |
| 2017 C&E Phoenix 25ft Ford Cutaway | 213-220 | 8 | 215 at Arundel mills |
| 2019 ford transit | 225-229 | 5 | |
| 2023 C&E Phoenix 25ft Ford Cutaway | 230-241 | 12 | |
| 2024 C&E Phoenix 25ft Ford Cutaway | 24224-24324 | 2 | 24324 Parked at Waterloo Park on layover from operating route 408 |
| 2024 RAM Promaster | 30124-30424 | 4 | Primarily used on HoCo Rapid Ride Microtransit (launched in 2025) |
| 2025 C&E Phoenix (Shuttle Version) Ford Cutaway | 24425-24525 | 2 | primarily used on the OEC Trolley Shuttle route/ both are wrapped with the OEC Trolley Shuttle livery Vehicle 24425 operating on the OEC Trolley Shuttle Route with the OEC Trolley wrap |
