= The Mall in Columbia =

Shopping mall in Howard County, Maryland, U.S.

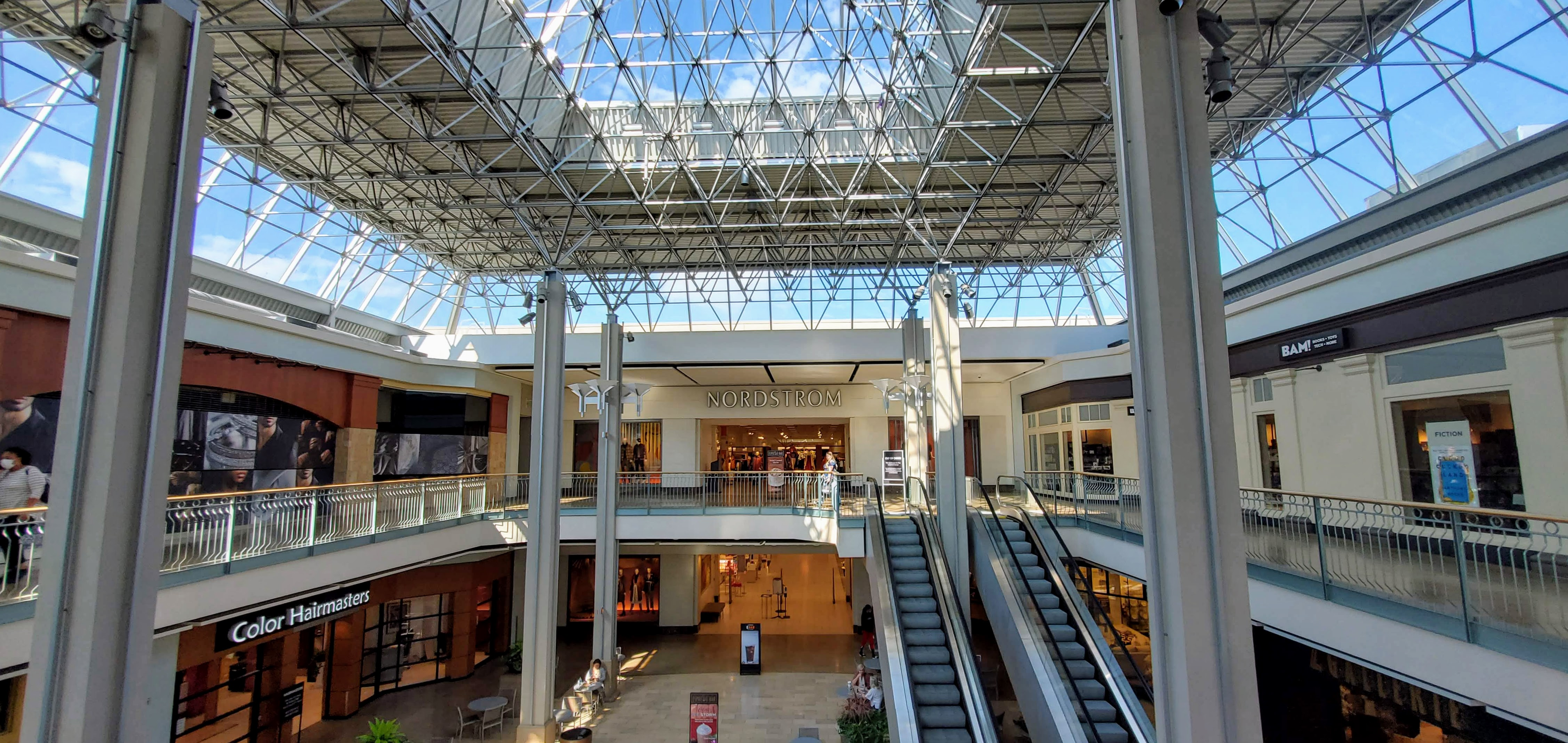
- Nordstrom wing (October 2021)
- Location: Columbia, Maryland, U.S.
- Coordinates: 39.215°N 76.861°W
- Address: 10300 Little Patuxent Parkway
- Opened: August 2, 1971; 55 years ago
- Developer: Howard Research & Development, Inc.
- Manager: GGP
- Owner: GGP and Nuveen Real Estate (Columbia Mall); Howard Hughes Holdings, Inc. (land)
- Architect: Cope, Linder, & Walmsley
- Num. of stores: 202
- Num. of anchor tenants: 6
- Floor area: 1,400,000 sq ft (130,000 m^{2})
- Floors: 2 (3 in Macy's)
- Parking: Parking lot with 7,200 spaces, including 3 parking garages
- Public transit: RTA Central Maryland bus: 401, 404, 405, 406, 407, 408, 501, 503; Flash BRT (Blue)
- Website: themallincolumbia.com

The Mall in Columbia, also known as the Columbia Mall, is the central shopping mall for the planned community of Columbia, Maryland, United States. It has over 200 specialty stores and the anchor stores are AMC Theatres, Lidl, Main Event Entertainment, Barnes & Noble, JCPenney, Macy's, and Nordstrom. Restaurants include PF Chang's, Maggiano's Little Italy and The Cheesecake Factory. It is located in the Town Center area of the city and attracts shoppers from surrounding counties in Maryland. It was developed by Howard Research & Development, Inc., a subsidiary of The Rouse Company and Connecticut General Life Insurance Company, which also founded the planned community itself.

== History ==
=== Development and opening ===
James W. Rouse developed the planned community of Columbia, in between Baltimore and Washington, D.C., in 1967. He later planned for the city to feature a large two-story shopping center that would serve as the "Main Street" of Columbia.

Architect Frank Gehry designed The Rouse Company's headquarters in Columbia, and was initially selected to design the neighboring mall centerpiece. However, Gehry was later rejected by James Rouse for lack of experience, and the firm of Cope, Linder, & Walmsley was contracted for the project.

Howard Research and Development, a subsidiary of The Rouse Company, in partnership with Connecticut General Life Insurance (now The Cigna Group) founded Maryland-based division Columbia Mall, Inc. for the project.

The Mall in Columbia began construction in June 1970, and had its grand opening on August 2, 1971 with two major anchor stores: Hochschild Kohn's (which was replaced by Hecht's in the mid-1970s) and Woodward & Lothrop (known informally as Woodies, which closed in late 1995 due to bankruptcy and was replaced by JCPenney in July 1996), as well as a McCrory's and Lerner's. Rouse subsidiary Howard Research and Development was probed shortly after opening for purchasing bulk energy contracts on electricity while charging market rates to tenants.

=== After opening ===
The Sears wing opened in 1981, along with an expansion of approximately 370,000 square feet (34,000 m^{2}) and about 55 specialty stores. It also featured the addition of a food court.

In 1997, the Hecht's store (now Macy's) added a third level. The Lord & Taylor wing opened in November 1998 (along with two new parking garages); the Nordstrom wing opened in September 1999. Also at this time, 20 to 30 stores opened in a new 60,000-square-foot (5,600 m^{2}) wing near Hecht's. To make the Columbia Mall more competitive with newer malls in Maryland – Towson Town Center which was renovated and expanded in October 1991, and the then-under construction Arundel Mills – The Rouse Company renovated The Mall in Columbia's interior by replacing the floors, lighting, skylights and air conditioning units by the end of 1998.

In 2003, AMC Theatres opened a 14-screen movie theater next to the Champps restaurant.

Rouse and its portfolio, including The Mall in Columbia, was acquired by Chicago-based General Growth Properties in November 2004 for $12.6 billion.

The Cheesecake Factory opened on the Columbia Mall property near the movie theater in late 2005. The mall's Hecht's store became Macy's on September 9, 2006 following Federated Department Stores' acquisition of it.

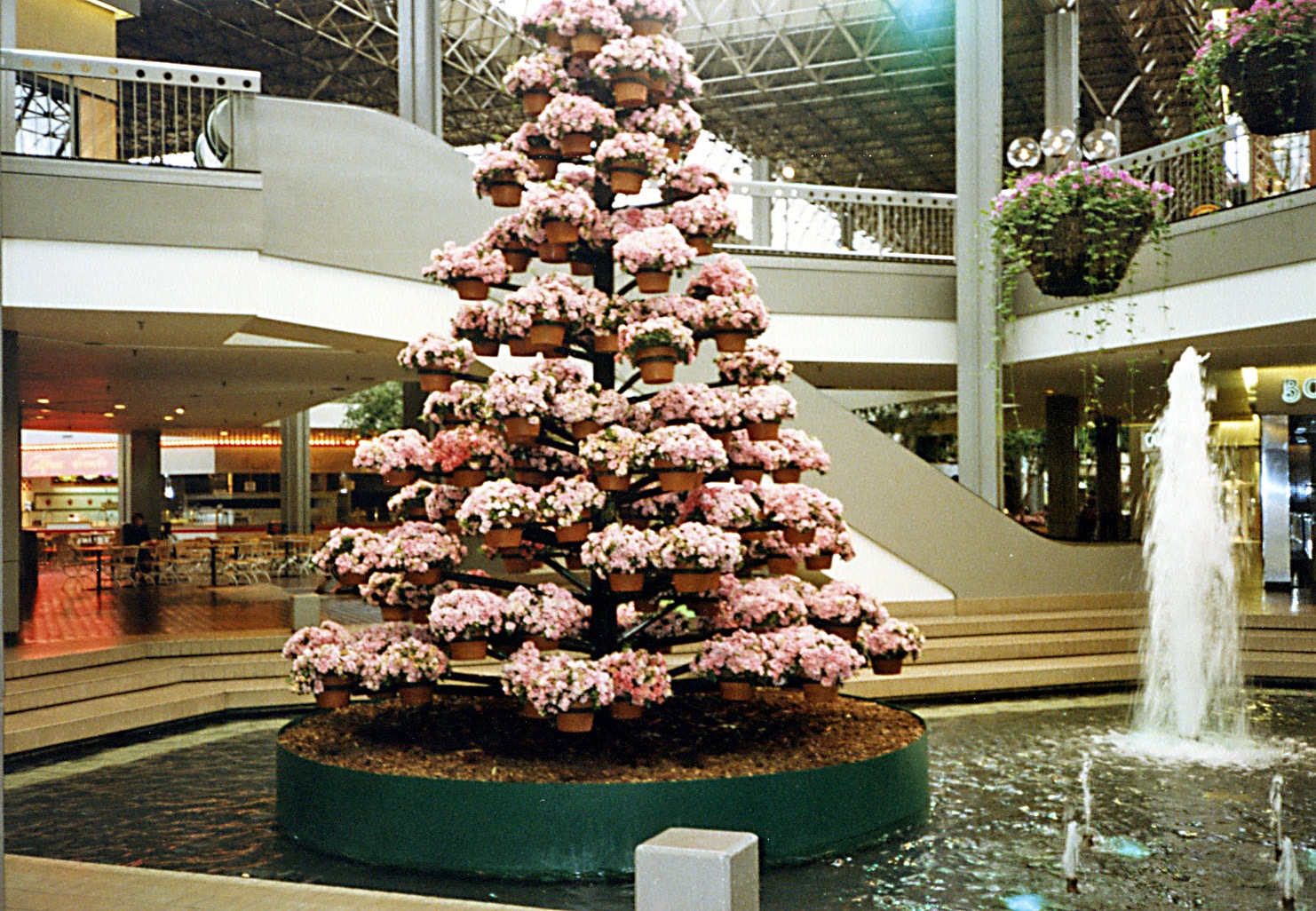
Poinsettia Tree, c. 1979

A December 2007 decision by local GGP managers to abandon the mall's traditional "Poinsettia Tree" Christmas display sparked a grassroots movement by several hundred Columbia residents for the return of the display which had come to be viewed as a local tradition. The story was picked up by The Washington Post, and the publicity led mall managers to reverse their decision and return the popular display in 2008. Part of what makes the "tree" unique is its watering system and plant specifications. In 2017, the large water fountain within which the "tree" had been installed each year, was replaced with at-grade flooring.

In early 2013, construction began on an addition to the outdoor The Plaza at The Mall in Columbia to replace the L.L. Bean store (which closed in May 2013) with additional stores and restaurants. The first phase of the outdoor expansion opened in November 2013. In 2014, phase two of the 70,000-square-foot (6,500 m^{2}) outdoor expansion to the mall opened, deemed The Plaza at The Mall in Columbia.

On April 28, 2015, Howard County Police announced an increased presence at village centers and malls following the protests and riots in Baltimore.

In June 2017, the center court fountain is removed, and Sears downsized its space to the first floor.

In May 2018, a 50,000-square-foot (4,600 m^{2}) Main Event Entertainment facility opened on the south side of the mall, featuring 22 bowling lanes and over a hundred virtual reality video games.

GGP Inc. officially became a Brookfield Properties subsidiary in August 2018.

In October 2018, it was also announced the Sears store would shutter as part of an ongoing decision to phase out of their traditional brick-and-mortar format and would become German supermarket chain Lidl.

In August 2020, Lord & Taylor closed when the chain went out of business as a direct result of the COVID-19 pandemic.

Lidl opened in the former Sears anchor space in 2021.

By 2023, The Mall in Columbia announced several additions; among them were Warby Parker, Under Armour, and Showcase.

Of the original 102 stores, the only one still in operation at the mall as of July 2024 is GNC.

In August 2025, Uniqlo announced that it would open at The Mall in Columbia, replacing the former Williams Sonoma space. Kendra Scott also had its grand opening.

Brookfield Properties reverted its retail division back to the GGP name in January 2026.

== Notable incidents ==
=== 2014 shooting ===
On January 25, 2014, at around 11:15 a.m., 19-year-old Darion Marcus Aguilar of Littleton, Colorado, who lived in College Park, Maryland at the time, entered the Zumiez store on the second floor of the mall, armed with a Mossberg 500 12-gauge shotgun with a pistol grip, and fired six to nine shots, killing two employees—21-year-old Brianna Benlolo and 25-year-old Tyler Johnson—and shot another person before committing suicide. Four others were injured unrelated to the shooting. Police arrived within two minutes to find an extensive amount of ammunition and crude explosive devices next to Aguilar's body, which were disabled safely. All of the injured were treated and later discharged from the Howard County General Hospital.

=== 2015 shooting ===
Former Jessup correctional officer Hong Young was arrested on March 2, 2015, on suspicion of shooting at the Columbia AMC theater building and gunfire incidents at the National Security Agency, Arundel Mills Costco, Inter-county Connector and Laurel Walmart.

=== 2024 shooting ===
On July 28, 2024, 17-year-old Angelo Little was shot and killed in the mall's food court in what police said was a targeted attack. Some witnesses told of their experiences on X. The suspect was later revealed to be another 17-year-old, and police offered a $10,000 reward for information leading to an arrest. The reward was increased to $30,000 in October as U.S. Marshals became involved, and in late May 2025, the then 18-year-old suspect William Marshall III was arrested in New York City. He was returned to Maryland in June 2025, after which bail was denied and he was held by the Howard County Detention Center.

=== 2025 shooting ===
On February 22, 2025, shots were fired outside of the mall's Lidl store. Police located two teenaged victims, one of whom was dead when the police arrived, and the other who died days later from his injuries. The shooter was identified the next day as 18-year-old Emmetson Zeah of Columbia and arrested on February 24, 2025. Howard County Chief of Police Gregory Der said it is believed that the shooting was targeted.

== Gallery ==
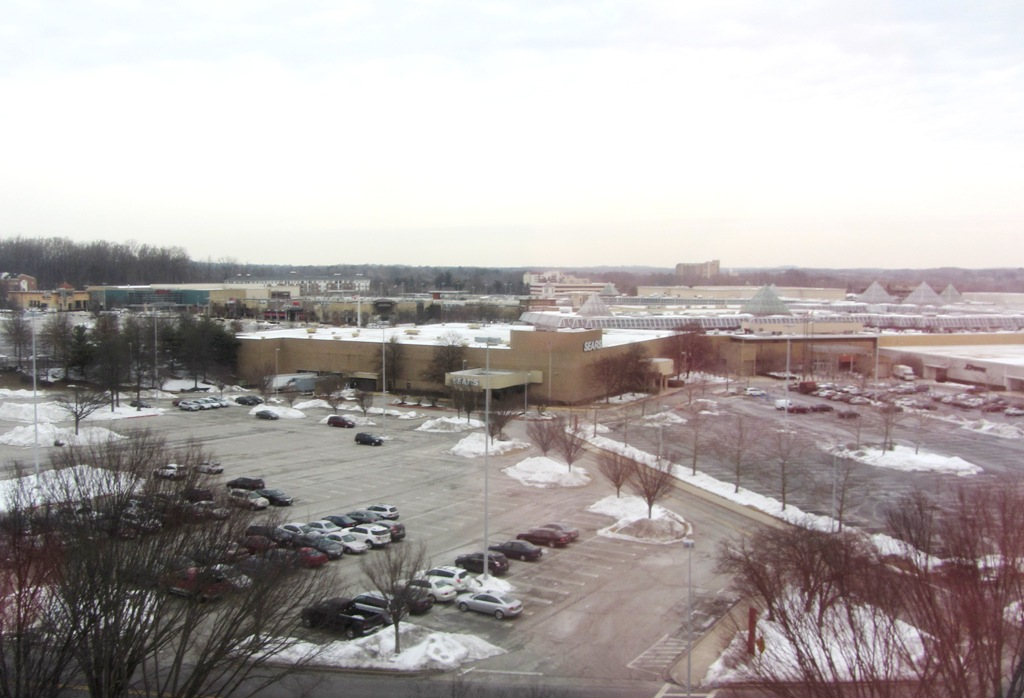
The Mall in Columbia in 2015

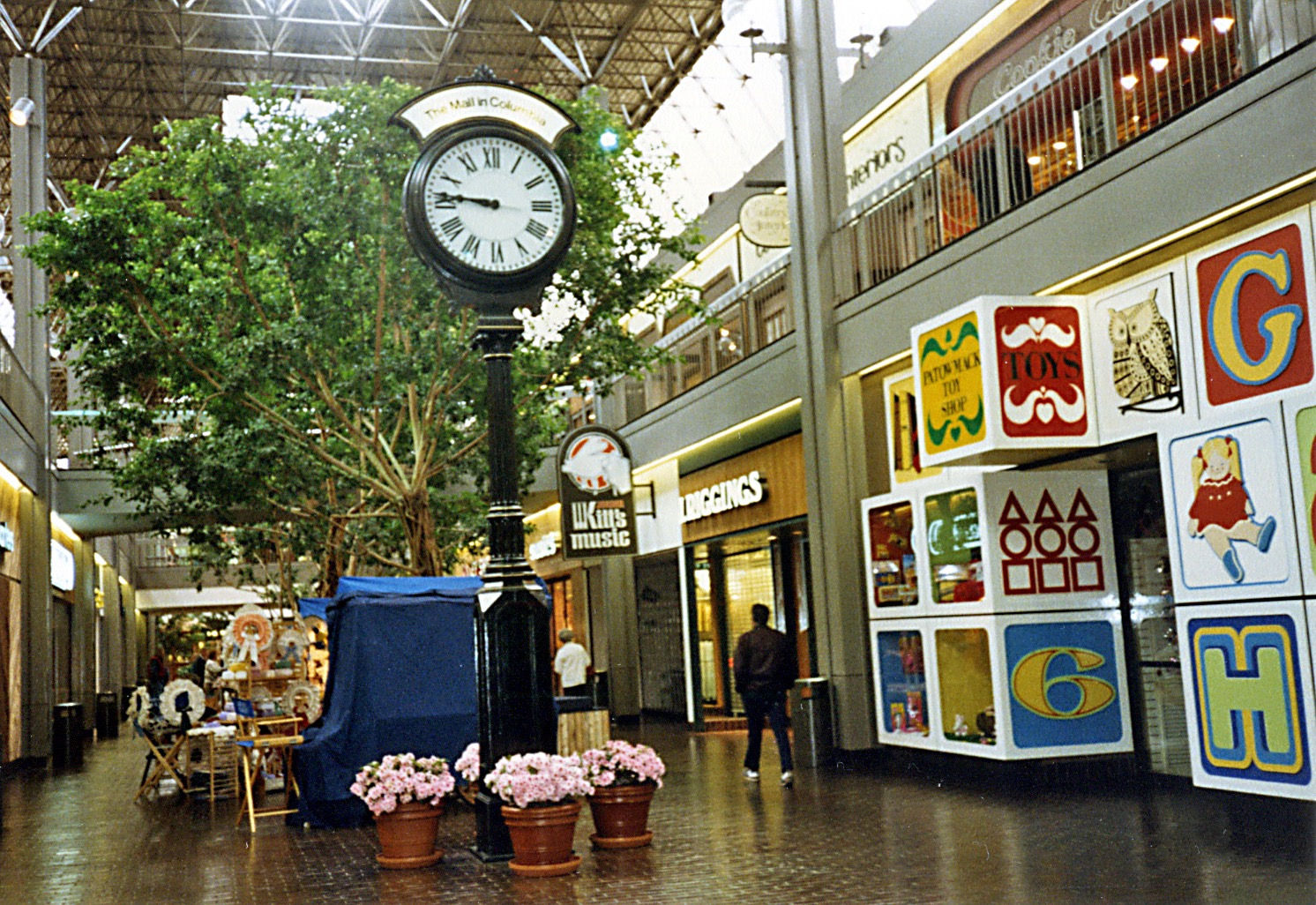
The Mall in Columbia, interior view, original section, first floor, c. 1979

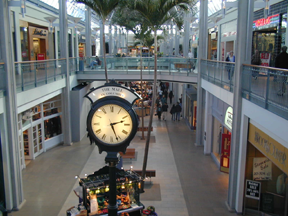
The Mall in Columbia, interior view, second floor, c. 2004
