= Harper's Choice, Columbia, Maryland =

Coordinates: 39°13′21″N 76°53′18″W

Harper's Choice
- Village
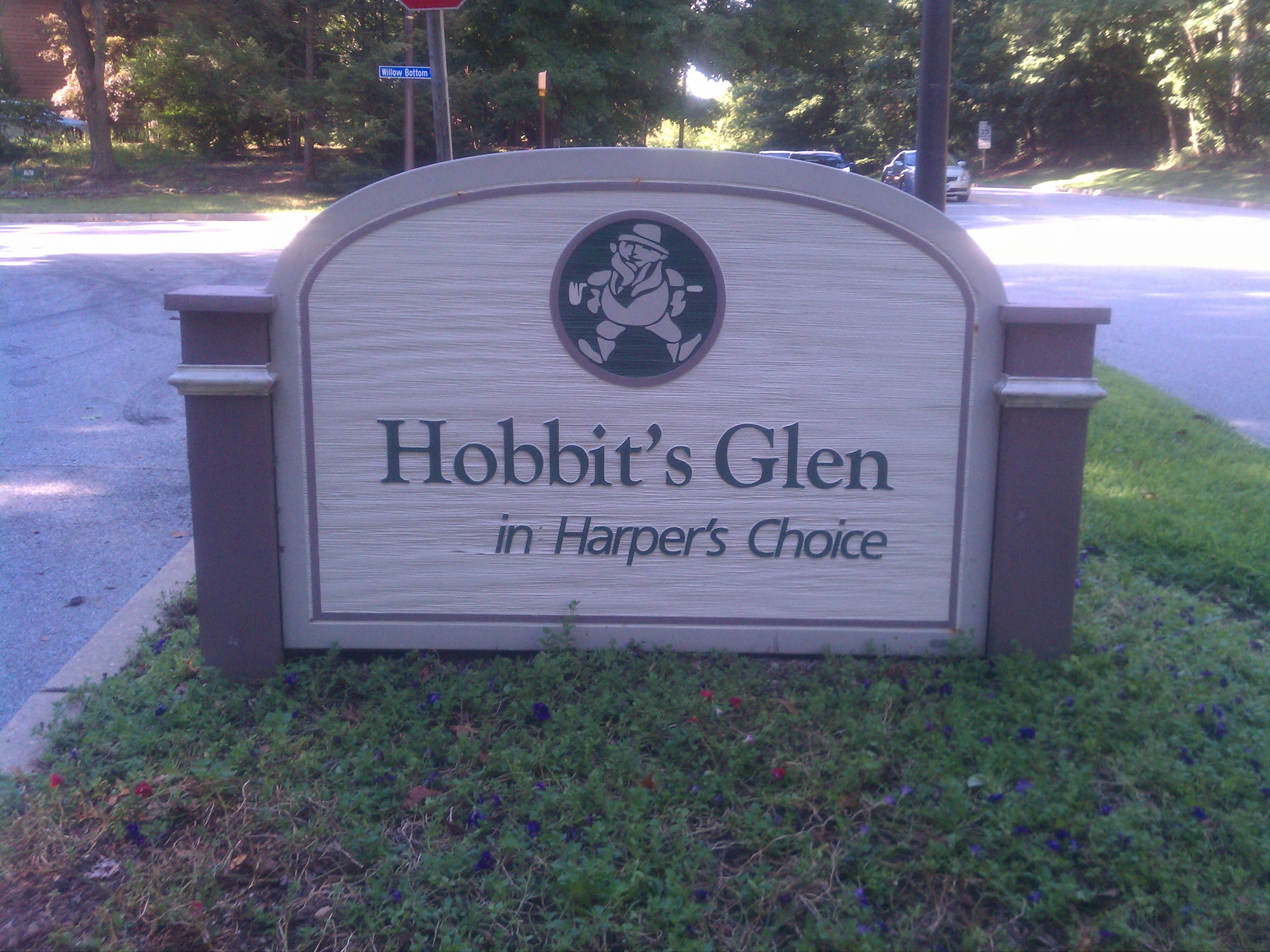
- Hobbit's Glen, a community within Harper's Choice.
- Interactive map of Harper's Choice
- Country: United States
- State: Maryland
- City: Columbia
- Established: 1967
- Named after: Robert Goodloe Harper

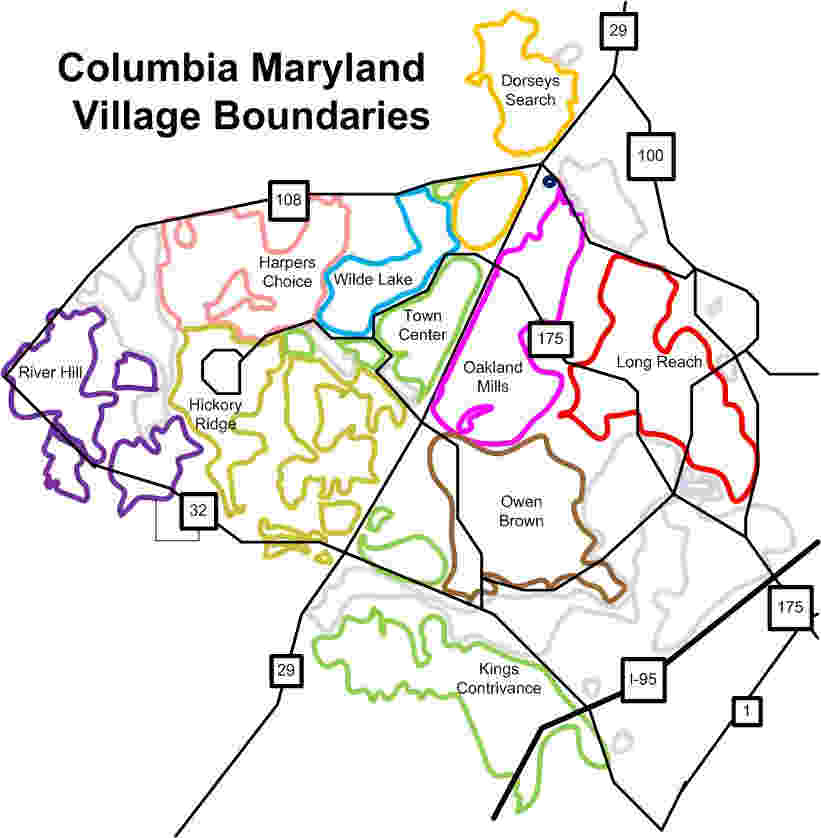
Villages of Columbia

Harper's Choice is one of the ten villages that comprise Columbia, Maryland, United States. It lies in the northwest part of Columbia and consists of the neighborhoods of Longfellow, Swansfield, and Hobbit's Glen and had a December 1998 population of 8,695.

== Etymology ==
Harper's Choice is named after Robert Goodloe Harper, a South Carolina representative who relocated to Baltimore to practice law. He was part of the Federalist mobs that stabbed, tarred and feathered British loyalists in Baltimore in June 1812. Harper later served in the War of 1812, Maryland State Senate, and United States Senate. He lived on his Oakland estate in the Roland Park area, where he was buried, although his grave was later moved to Baltimore's Greenmount Cemetery.

The Longfellow community was named for the American poet, Henry Wadsworth Longfellow and the street names are taken from his works. Hobbit's Glen was taken from the works of English author J. R. R. Tolkien, along with the street names. Swansfield's name was inspired by the etching The Swan by James McNeill Whistler, and the street names derive from the works of Winslow Homer.

== History ==
The majority of Harper's Choice is built on the original Carroll slave plantation tract Doughoregan Manor. The Harper family farm "Jericho" was built on a portion of the estate, and sold by the Harper family between 1962 and 1964 to the Rouse Company before the announcement of the Columbia project. Clarence Bassler sold 63 acres of his farm in 1963, with George Bassler selling 140 the next year, retaining land for the Harper's Choice Village Center.

Home sites were sold by Howard Research and Development (Rouse) to larger homebuilders. Levitt & Sons, known for building Levittown, New York, bought land for over 600 units but halted construction in 1970 at 151 homes due to code violations. In August 1971, Harper's Choice Village Center opened with housing above shops. In 1978, the village suffered from a string of arson attacks, including 26 in a two-day period from a local resident. By the 1990s, the village center shops were in decline with little investment from the Rouse Company. In 2004, MS-13 gang activity was reported in the neighborhood.

In 2007, a study determined that the Middle Patuxent Environmental Area of the Patuxent River was "fair to poor biological conditions and only partial support of habitat conditions" from runoff related to development in the Hobbit's Glen area. The Middle Patuxent Environmental Foundation was formed to study the issue in 2015 with a $38,000 Watershed Assistance Grant Program.

== Services ==
The Harper's Choice Village Center has a grocery store, banks, restaurants, and other retail establishments. The community center, Kahler Hall, was named in 1971 for the William C. Kahler family, who sold a portion of their farm in November 1962 followed later by the remaining 280 acres. The original name for the village center was "Joseph Square", named for John Joseph, chairperson of the first Harper's Choice Village Board.

The Florence Bain Senior Center in the Swansfield neighborhood, opened in 1983 and was renovated in 2005. It is named for Florence Bain. She started the local AARP chapter and was the first chairperson of Howard County's Commission on Aging. Winter Growth/Ruth Keeton House, offering an assisted living program, is located next to the Senior Center. It is named for the former council member, Ruth U. Keeton.

== Athletic facilities ==
The Athletic Club, one of Columbia's three athletic facilities, is located in Swansfield. An 18-hole par 72 golf course is located in Hobbit's Glen, which also includes tennis courts and a pool. Originally named "Jericho", the Harper family requested Rouse not to use the name of their family farm. The Columbia SportsPark, an 18-hole miniature golf course, batting cages, and skate park is located in the Harper's Choice village center.

An extensive walking/biking trail connects the neighborhoods.
