= City Gear =

American clothing store chain

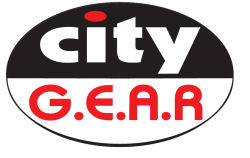
- City Gear logo
- Formerly: Shelmar Retail Partners
- Industry: Apparel retailer
- Founded: 1978 in Memphis, Tennessee
- Defunct: 2025
- Key people: Ben Knighten (President)
- Parent: JD Sports (Until June 2025) Hibbett Sports (Until July 2024)
- Website: www.dtlr.com

City Gear was an American company that operates over 130 stores in the central region of the US.

City Gear was founded in 1978 under the name Shelmar Retail Partners LLC. It was created in and was operated out of Memphis, Tennessee. City Gear was merged with DTLR and Shoe Palace in the Spring of 2025.

The store sold lifestyle clothing and footwear from brands such as: Nike, Jordan, Levi's, and Grindhouse.

== Acquisitions ==
City Gear has been very active in the last several years in the M+A market. In 2011, they acquired the Deveroes chain of 14 stores with locations in Cincinnati, Indianapolis, Dayton, and Columbus. Within twelve months, City Gear acquired a 16 store chain with operations principally in Atlanta and a smaller 3 store chain with operations in Kansas City.

== Endorsements ==
City Gear has several endorsement deals. Recently, they struck a deal with a summer basketball league called The Deveroes Summer League in Cincinnati. They also have endorsement deals with several NBA teams. They endorse the teams in the cities that have stores in them, which include the Memphis Grizzlies, Houston Rockets, New Orleans Pelicans, and the Atlanta Hawks. As a part of this endorsement, City Gear acquired the Cincinnati-based company Deveroes. Deveroes is a store chain with similar products to City Gear, and its acquisition by City Gear allows them to branch out into the mid-west.

== Labor controversy ==
There has been one major labor controversy for City Gear. Several of the managers of their stores have made the claim that they were not being paid for their overtime. On December 11, 2012, a collective action lawsuit was filed against City Gear for $25 million. The claim being made against is that City Gear “violated the wage-and-hour provisions of the FLSA by depriving Plaintiffs, as well as others similarly situated to Plaintiffs, of their lawful overtime wages.” The CEO of City Gear made the claim that the complaints were "just not accurate". The managers of the stores say that they were "converted to hourly employees if they fail to log 45 hours during the work week, hours for which they are allegedly denied overtime pay."
