= Central Maryland Regional Transit =

Bus system and mobility management service in Maryland, U.S.

- Founded: May 1987, as Corridor Transportation Corporation, by the Baltimore Washington Corridor Chamber
- Commenced operation: May 1989
- Ceased operation: (Renamed) by Jan 2018
- Locale: Laurel, Maryland
- Service area: Anne Arundel County, Prince George's County, Howard County
- Service type: Transit bus
- Alliance: Central Maryland Transportation Alliance
- Routes: 17
- Fleet: 72 vehicles
- Annual ridership: 1.6 million in FY 2011
- Operator: Central Maryland Regional Transit
- Chief executive: James B. Perez
- Finance and Administration Director: Beverly Walenga
- Website: www.transitrta.com

Central Maryland Regional Transit was a bus system serving the greater Laurel, Maryland area and parts of the neighboring Anne Arundel, Prince George's, and Howard counties. Former service into Montgomery County ended in January 2010 due to a lack of funding, though a re-expansion to the county was sought.

CMRT was founded as the Corridor Transportation Corporation in May 1987 by the Baltimore Washington Corridor Chamber, and began its transit operation as Connect-a-Ride two years later with nine buses serving five routes. The non-profit organization gained independence and changed its name in the early 2010 timeframe, and the bus service rebranded to the same name in early 2013.

In 2014, Howard County initiated its own Regional Transportation Agency of Central Maryland, recruiting Anne Arundel County to join. CMRT bid on providing services to these regions after July 1, but lost to First Transit.

Despite no longer running transit operations as of July 1, 2014, CMRT continued operation as a 501(c)(3), nonprofit organization, specifically dedicated to providing mobility management services such as travel training and a website and call center branded the Transportation Resource Information Point. CMRT's Travel Training program was "a comprehensive training program designed to teach people the necessary skills to travel safely and independently on fixed-route public transportation" and "...intended for individuals with disabilities, senior citizens, students and low-income families." The Transportation Resource Information Point was a one-call, one-click resource designed to provide regional transit information throughout Central Maryland. Both programs serve a six-county region including Anne Arundel, Baltimore, Carroll, Harford, Howard, and Prince George's Counties, and including the City of Baltimore.

By January 2018, CMRT had become the Center for Mobility Equity.
