= Arundel Mills =

Shopping mall in Hanover, Maryland, U.S.

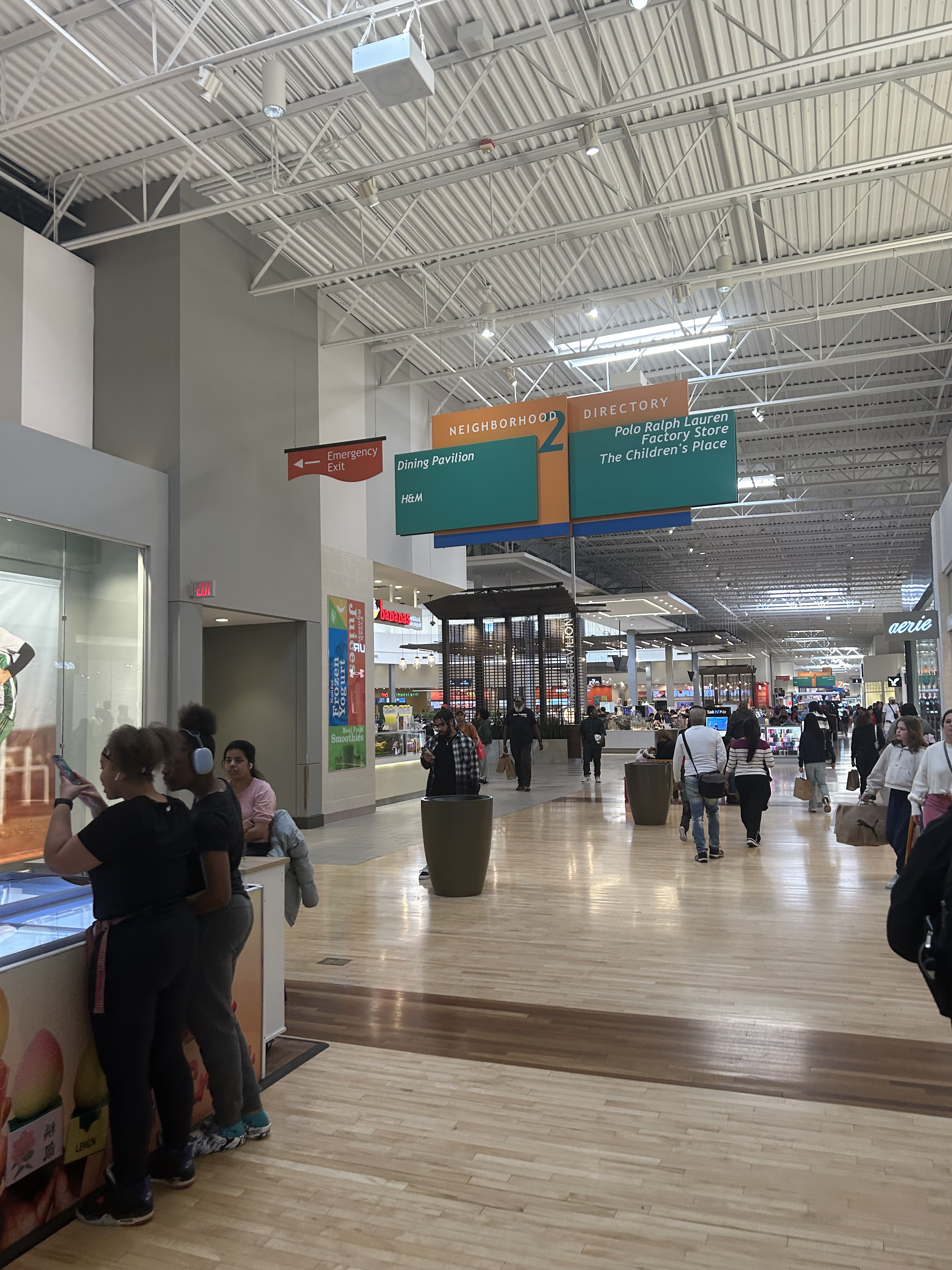
- Neighborhood 2 concourse (March 2026)
- Location: Hanover, Maryland, U.S.
- Coordinates: 39.1578°N 76.7247°W
- Address: 7000 Arundel Mills Circle
- Opened: November 17, 2000; 26 years ago
- Renovated: 2017–2018 (food court); Early 2023 (new paint job)
- Developer: The Mills Corporation; Simon Property Group; KanAm Group
- Manager: Simon Premium Outlets; The Mills: A Simon Company
- Owner: Simon Property Group (59.3%); KanAm Group (40.7%)
- Architect: D'Agostino Izzo Quirk Architects, Inc. (D'AIQ); RTKL Associates (ID8)
- Num. of stores: 250+
- Num. of anchor tenants: 17 (at peak)
- Floor area: 1,930,820 square feet (180,000 m^{2})
- Floors: 1
- Parking: Lighted lot with free parking 7035 Arundel Mills Circle Parking
- Public transit: MTA Maryland bus: 75, 201; RTA Central Maryland bus: 201, 202, 501, 502
- Website: www.simon.com/mall/arundel-mills www.simon.com/mall/arundel-mills-marketplace
- Building details
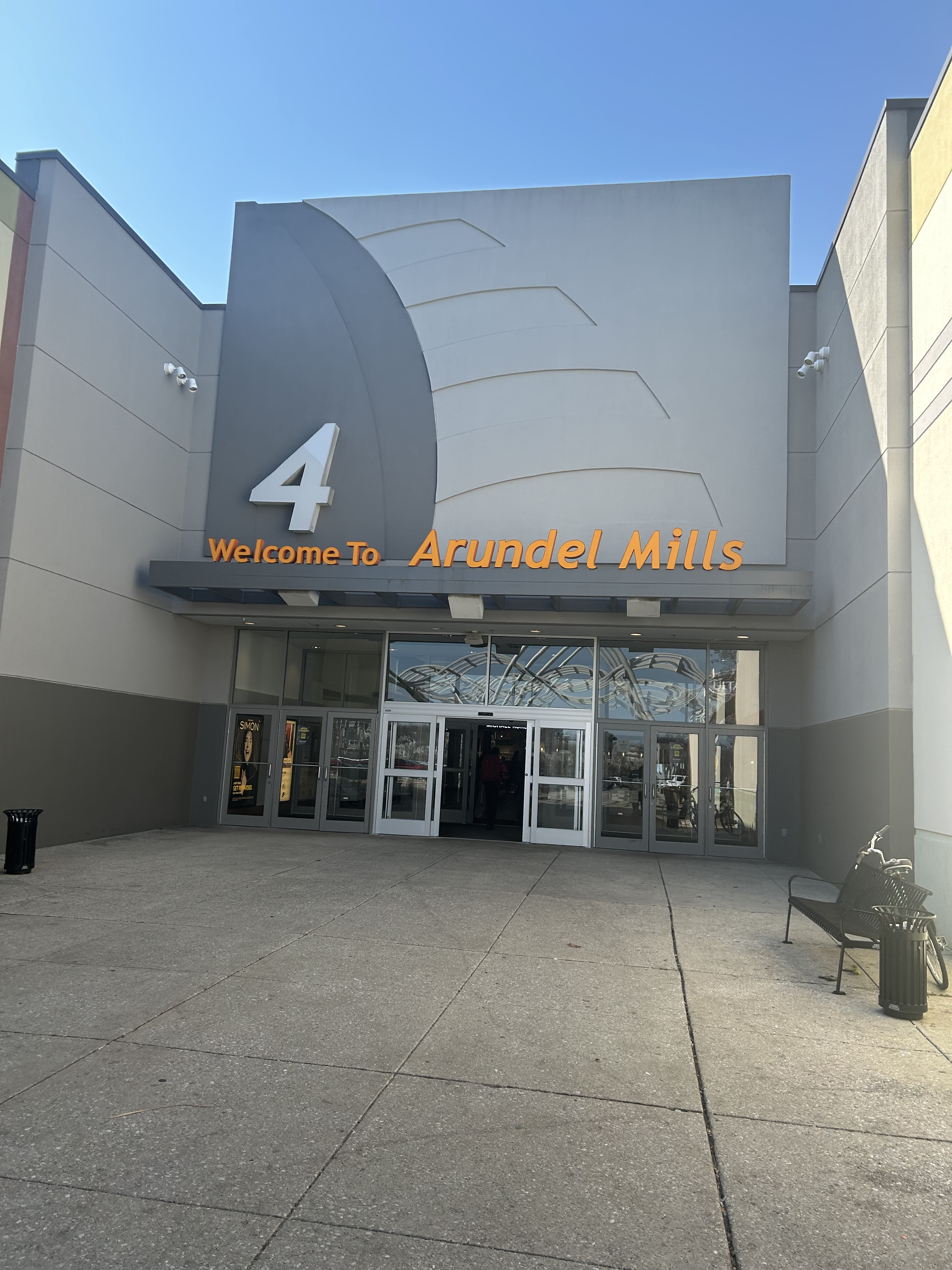
- Entrance 4 (March 2026)

General information
- Status: Operational
- Construction started: July 1999; 27 years ago
- Completed: 2000

Design and construction
- Main contractor: Somerset Construction Company

Renovating team
- Architects: Bartlett Hartley & Mulkey Architects
- Renovating firm: Simon Property Group

Arundel Mills is a super-regional outlet mall in Hanover, Maryland, United States. It is managed by Simon Property Group through their Premium Outlets and Mills divisions, which owns 59.3% of the mall. The remaining shares are owned by the KanAm Group. With 1,930,820 square feet (179,379 m^{2}) of gross leasable area (GLA), (Note: Claim may vary by source.) it is the largest shopping mall in Maryland.

Primarily developed by the Mills Corporation, the mall is at the intersection of Maryland Route 100 and the Baltimore–Washington Parkway (Maryland Route 295) in northwestern Anne Arundel County (hence the name "Arundel" Mills). Typical to most Landmark Mills malls, Arundel Mills opened in 2000 with five neighborhoods in a "racetrack"-like format, which were sponsored until the mall was renovated in between 2017 and 2023 by Simon.

== History ==
=== Mid-1990s–2000: Development and opening ===
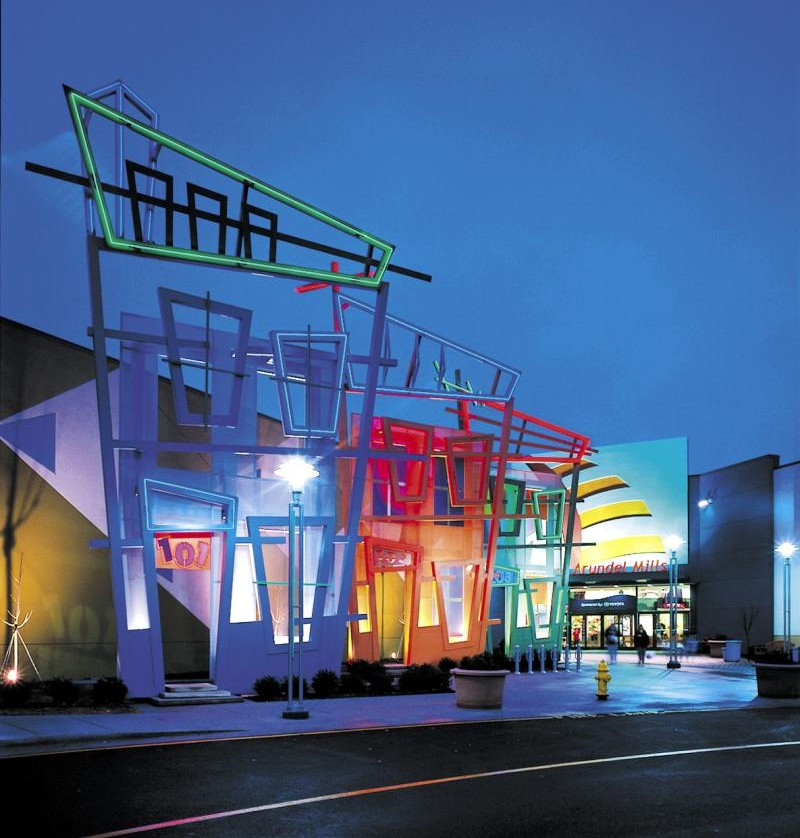
The Rowhouse Entry at Charm City Neighborhood 1 in the 2000s, as seen at night

Beginning in the mid-1990s, the Arlington, Virginia-based Mills Corporation purchased approximately 850 acres (340 ha) of former farmland and the defunct Patapsco Ridge Beagle Club in Hanover. German-based KanAm Group was involved with development and funding. In 1997, Washington, D.C.-based Somerset Construction Company and its president, Mike Caruthers, alongside his partners, sold roughly 400 to 450 acres (160 to 180 ha) of this land to the Mills Corporation specifically for the construction of the planned shopping mall on the site.

The project was known as Arundel Mills and was proposed as Maryland's largest shopping mall, with over 1.3 million square feet (120 thousand square meters) of retail space, directly competing with similar shopping centers in the Baltimore-Washington metropolitan area, such as Owings Mills Mall and the then-largest mall in Maryland, Towson Town Center. The focus for the project would be on high-quality outlets, entertainment venues, and big-box anchors to attract regional shoppers in the Baltimore City, Baltimore County, and Washington, D.C. areas. Somerset Construction Company would lead as the main contractor.

In August 1998, the Anne Arundel County Council approved specialized zoning modifications for the new shopping center development. However, development was criticized in the late 1990s due to concerns about traffic congestion from retail saturation in the Baltimore and D.C. areas, stemming from adjacent Maryland Route 100 and the Baltimore-Washington Parkway, as well as wetland destruction and increased stormwater runoff. It would cost $28 million in road and sewer construction for the mall, both of which would be funded by Anne Arundel County. In August 1998, The Washington Post warned that the development would essentially repeat the initial problems of Potomac Mills.

The Mills Corp. successfully addressed these concerns. Only 1.4 acres (0.57 ha) of wetland was filled. Arundel Mills began construction in July 1999 amid protests against the project, including those from county executive Janet S. Owens. The wetlands fill plan was approved by the Army Corps of Engineers and the Maryland Department of the Environment (MDE) in October 1999, and the mall had its grand opening celebration on November 17, 2000, with over 250 stores. It was the first enclosed mall to feature a Medieval Times dinner theater. Original stores included TJ Maxx and Books-A-Million. Simon DeBartolo Group of Indianapolis, Indiana, held joint venture interests in Arundel Mills.

==== Design and architecture ====
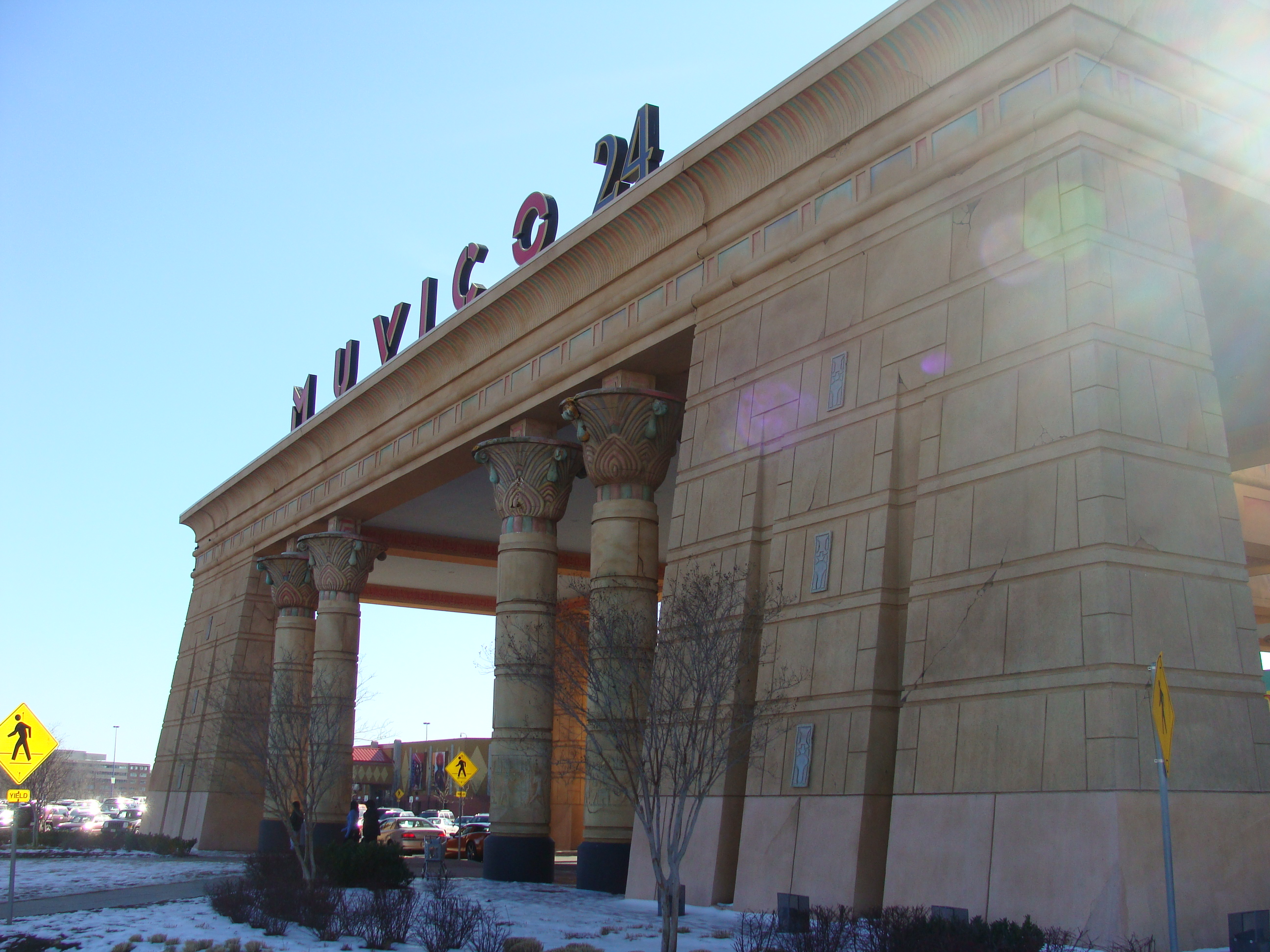
Muvico Egyptian 24 (February 2009)

As is common for other Landmark Mills malls, the interior walkway resembles a "racetrack" design and, more noticeably, the outline of a boat. The mall featured a train-themed food court known as The Roundhouse, which paid homage to the B&O Railroad Museum's historic roundhouse hence the name. The overall design was part of the Mills Corp.'s "shoppertainment" model, and Arundel Mills was designed by Somerville, Massachusetts-based D'Agostino Izzo Quirk Architects, Inc. (DiQuinzio). The mall's interior was designed by ID8, a division of local architectural firm RTKL Associates. The architects took inspiration from the Rouse Company's festival marketplaces and shopping malls in Maryland, such as Harborplace (designed by Benjamin Thompson & Associates, Inc.), and White Marsh Mall (also designed by RTKL). Some individual tenants hired their own architects for their spaces, with local firm Development Design Group as the architect for Muvico. The DuClaw Brewing Company restaurant was designed by AHS architects (AHSa/Ammon Heisler Sachs architects) for Aero Service Group.

=== 2000–2007: Early years ===
Arundel Mills drew 14 million visitors during its first year of operation. In addition to 17 large anchor stores, Arundel Mills also features an Egyptian 24-screen megaplex theater. The cinema was the only outlet of its Muvico Theaters chain in the state of Maryland.

In May 2002, Simon Property Group sold its 75% interest in Arundel Mills back to KanAm and the Mills Corp. for $430 million.

==== Design and architecture (continued) ====
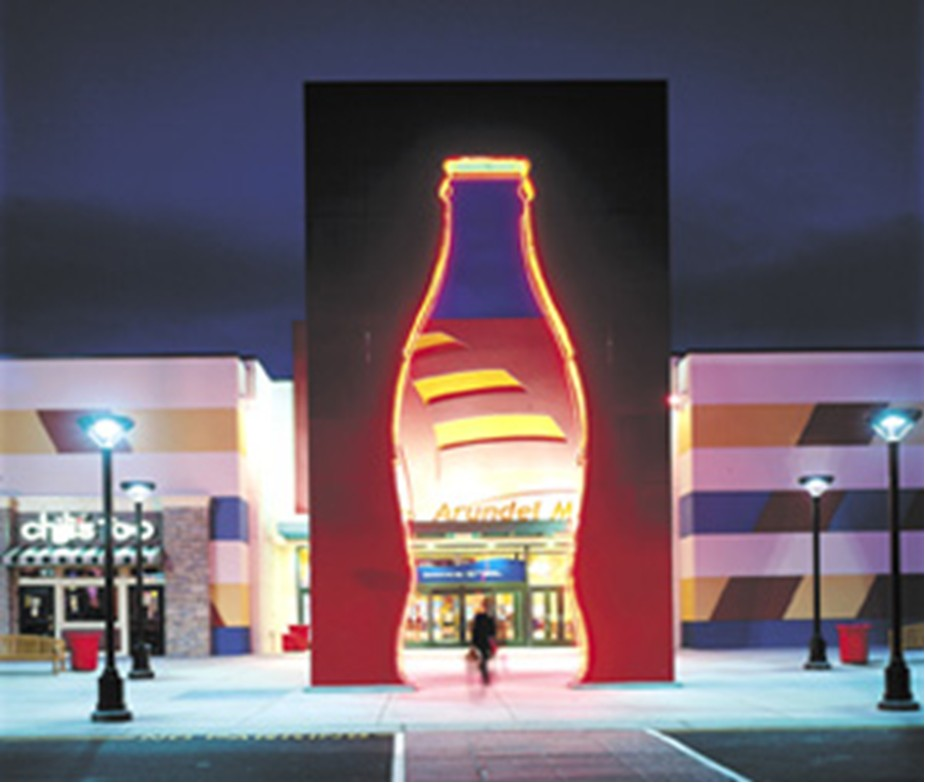
Coca-Cola Entry at Maryland Scenic Drive Neighborhood 2 at night

Arundel Mills originally featured colorful assets, including the Mills TV, which would display video loops of music videos, movie trailers, and advertisements for the mall's tenants. Colorful assets also included five themed neighborhoods, featuring "Courts" in each concourse sponsored by The Coca-Cola Company, Toyota, The Baltimore Sun, Comcast, and Discover Card. Additional sponsors included Bank of America and the University of Maryland Baltimore Washington Medical Center. The original courts included the Bowl-A-Rama Court in Neighborhood 1, the Toyota Court in Neighborhood 2, the Baltimore Sun Court and the Pinball Palace Court in Neighborhood 3, originally anchored by Jillian's Entertainment. The Fashion Avenue Court, and the Lily's Pad Court, were in Neighborhoods 4 and 5, were anchored by Saks Off 5th (hence the name "Fashion" Avenue Court), alongside Bed Bath & Beyond and Bass Pro Shops Outdoor World.

H&M opened at Arundel Mills in February 2003, being the store's first location in the Baltimore/D.C. area. The Maryland Daily Record noted the store as "cheap" and "chic". The Crayola Works Creativity & Studio Store opened at the mall in July 2002 and closed permanently in February 2004 for unspecified reasons. The parent company, Crayola, then known as the Binney & Smith Company, redirected visitors to the Crayola Factory (now Crayola Experience) in Easton, Pennsylvania. Dave & Buster's Grand Sports Café, a sports bar and family-friendly arcade, announced an opening at Arundel Mills in November 2005, replacing the defunct Jillian's via a $47 million acquisition deal in May 2004. The former Crayola Works space was taken by Neiman Marcus Last Call in March 2006.

=== 2007–2019: Simon Property Group ===
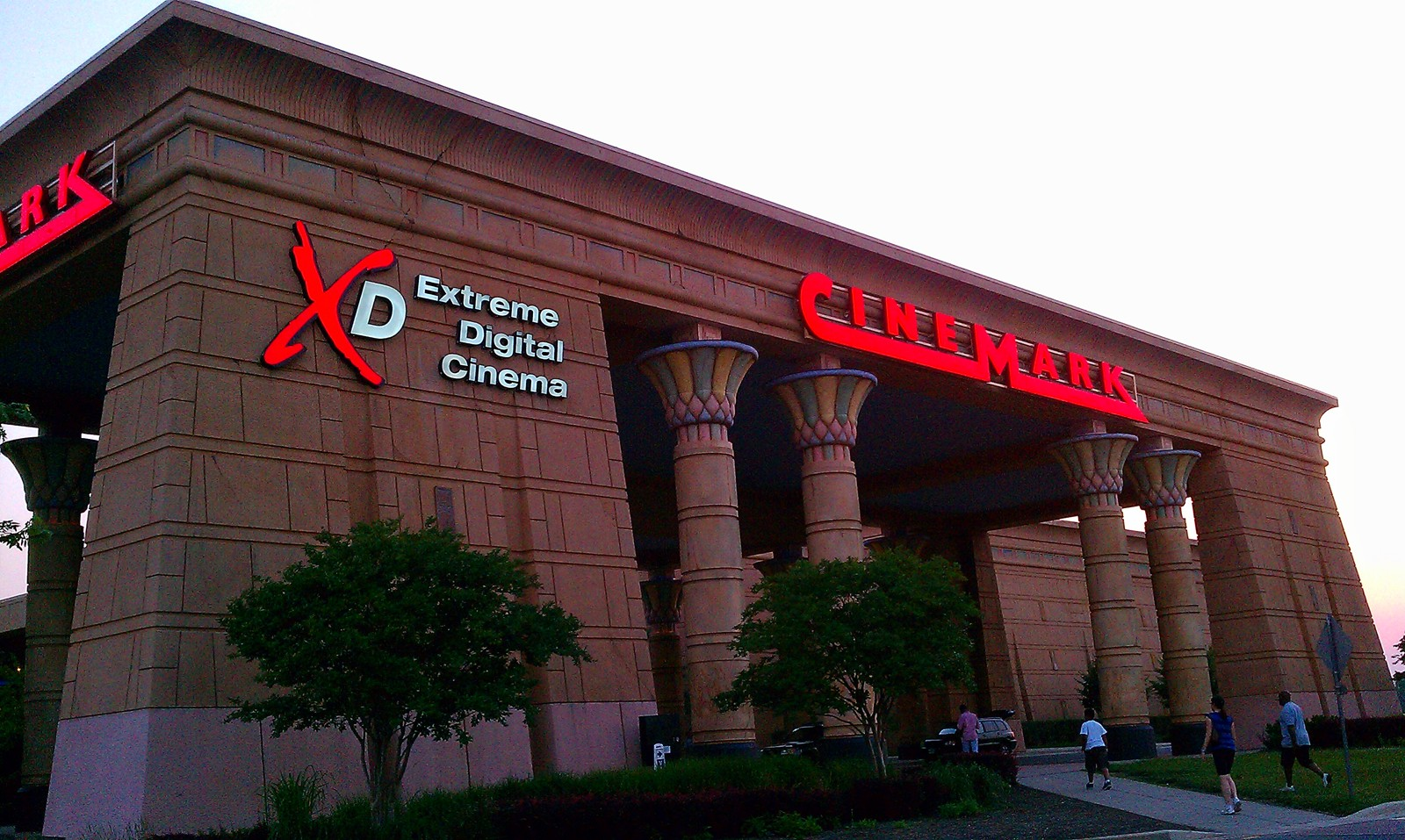
Cinemark Egyptian 24 and XD Megaplex Theaters (May 2011)

In May 2006, The Mills Corporation was investigated by the Securities and Exchange Commission (SEC) due to extensive accounting irregularities and fraudulent financial reporting. As a result, in February 2007, the company's portfolio, including Arundel Mills, was acquired by Simon Property Group and Farallon Capital Management for $1.64 billion. The acquisition was completed in April 2007, and the Mills Corp. was rebranded The Mills: A Simon Company.

In March 2009, Muvico sold the Arundel Mills Egyptian 24, along with three other theaters located in Florida, to Texas-based Cinemark Theatres as part of a multimillion-dollar deal. While the theater was rebranded as Cinemark Egyptian 24 in September 2009, the company initially stated that moviegoers would not notice major changes to the Egyptian-themed decor or operations during the transition. The Cinemark Egyptian 24 was renovated in May 2010, with the conversion of one auditorium into the company's first "Extreme Digital" large-screen format in the region, featuring a floor-to-ceiling screen and a 24-speaker custom sound system, known as Cinemark XD. New carpeting, aisle lighting, 14 self-ticketing kiosks, and an expanded guest service area were also introduced, alongside a self-serve concession stand and a "Cafe Cinema" serving specialty snacks and drinks.

In March 2012, Simon Property Group acquired full control of the property's management by buying out Farallon's stake in 26 Landmark Mills malls for $1.5 billion. On June 6, 2012, Maryland Live! Casino (Note: Now Live! Casino & Hotel.) opened to the public, adjacent to Arundel Mills, while a second phase of the casino opened in September 2012. In winter 2013, Forever 21 would open at the mall, replacing FYE (For Your Entertainment), which relocated to a smaller space within the mall.

==== Food court renovation ====
From 2017 to 2018, the mall interior underwent cosmetic upgrades, including new tile flooring, LED lighting, the installation of kiosks throughout the mall, and seating areas, to align with the more modern aesthetic of the neighboring casino and the newly-opened Live! hotel in April 2018. The renovations were developed by Simon Property Group and designed by the North Carolina-based Bartlett Hartley & Mulkey (BHM). During that time, Neiman Marcus Last Call closed its Arundel Mills location as part of a plan to close ten stores worldwide to focus on its full-line stores. In mid-June 2017, Under Armour Factory House opened at the mall.

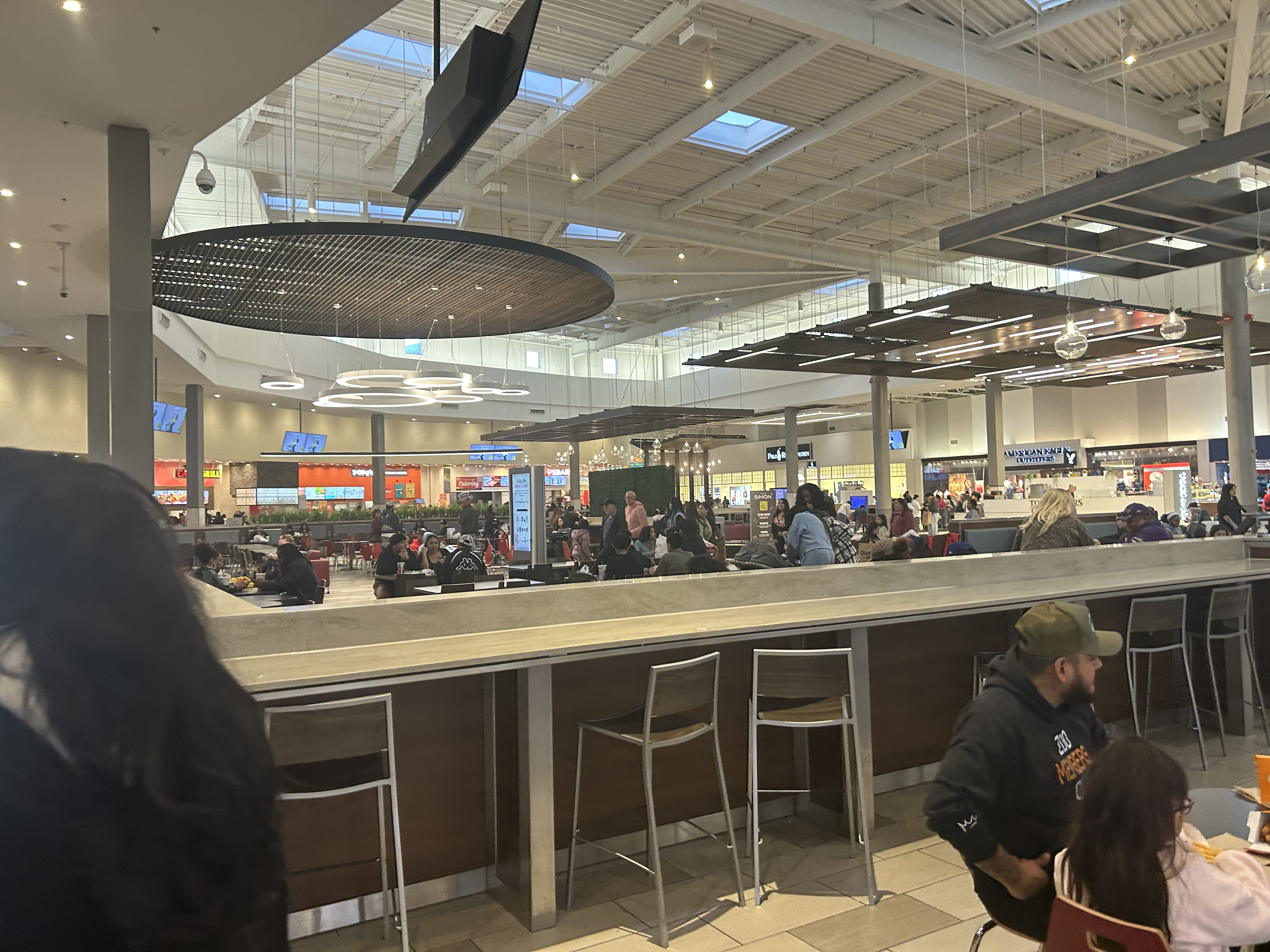
The Dining Pavilion in March 2026, with Kelly's Cajun Grill and Popeyes Louisiana Kitchen in the background

The renovations included the Roundhouse food court, which Simon Property Group rebranded as the Dining Pavilion at Arundel Mills, replacing the food court's original summer theme with a contemporary architectural aesthetic, charging stations with Wi-Fi connectivity, new LED lights, and updated seating. The remodeled food court added new eateries to the mall, including The Crepe Escape & Creamery, Green Leaf's & Bananas, Suki Hana / Wokaholic, Charleys Philly Steaks, and the first Zinburger Wine & Burger Bar in Maryland. Existing restaurants, such as Sbarro, remained operational. Ulta Beauty opened on May 3, 2019, in the former Last Call space.

On June 13, 2019, the DuClaw Brewing Company at Arundel Mills closed permanently. The restaurant stated that the mall was "unfortunately, no longer a place we can call home". It was announced in mid-July 2019 that Yard House would open a restaurant at DuClaw's former spot the following year.

=== 2020–2021: COVID-19 pandemic ===
Yard House announced on March 6, 2020, that it would open the following month, but needed to hire at least 200 staff members to help run the restaurant.

During construction on Yard House, Arundel Mills temporarily closed on March 19, 2020, due to the COVID-19 pandemic, alongside Annapolis Mall and other Simon properties in the U.S. It reopened on June 20, 2020, under strict social distancing conditions. In December 2020, multiple vehicles in the Live! Casino & Hotel parking garage were damaged overnight by vandalism, and a possibly-related vehicle fled the scene. Bed Bath & Beyond shuttered by the end of 2020. MD Furniture Outlet later took that spot. Modell's Sporting Goods filed for Chapter 11 bankruptcy and also shuttered in March 2020, as part of a plan to close nine Maryland stores, including Arundel Mills.

While the mall reopened in the summer of 2020, some tenants remained closed throughout the pandemic. The Cinemark movie theater did not reopen until January 2021. In March 2021, the Disney Store closed its doors, as The Walt Disney Company announced that it would be closing at least 60 stores in North America, with two located in Maryland per its website: this one at Arundel Mills, and the other at White Marsh Mall. Disney cited the pandemic and a move from physical retail to its shopDisney e-commerce platform as the reason for the mass closures. Best Buy closed at Arundel Mills permanently in October 2021 after refusing to renew its lease.

=== 2023–present: Mall renovation ===
Since the mall's June 2020 reopening, Simon Property Group began a $3.5 million renovation that involved painting over the mall's ceilings, entrances, and architectural elements in a white-and-silver color palette, along with the installation of advertisement TVs and fresh lighting. As part of these renovations, the mall added five major national retailers to its "Fashion Wing" in July 2023, including adidas Outlet Store, The North Face, Vera Bradley, Velocity Denim, and Hollister. In August 2023, Irish store Primark announced an opening at Arundel Mills in September, taking over the former Best Buy space. It was the chain's first store in Maryland.

On July 10, 2024, Dave & Buster's held a "grand reopening" after completing a massive renovation, introducing The Arena, an immersive gaming space, digital darts, and social bays for group play. Later that month, what was now open at the mall included DTLR, HeyDude, Pandora, and children's play area Kids Empire. The North Face expanded its store to 18,000 sq ft (1,700 m^{2}). True Religion Outlet opened near Bass Pro Shops, and T-Mobile renovated its space into the T-Mobile Experience Store concept. In September 2024, Simon implemented a Youth Supervision Policy at Arundel Mills, requiring minors to be accompanied by an adult 21 or older after 3:00 p.m. ET on Fridays and Saturdays. This was a direct response to crime and vandalism in the area, and anyone under 18 violating this policy would be escorted from the property. Specifically, the policy was enacted after police reported dozens of incidents involving minors, including 19 assaults, 18 thefts, and six robberies since the start of 2024.

In November 2024, four new stores opened at the mall: Trendy Men, RuyaFashions, Lindt Chocolate, and La Michoacana Prime. Real Fruit Bubble Tea was announced to open in early 2025. In February 2025, Forever 21 announced that it would close all of its U.S. stores—including Arundel Mills—following its Chapter 11 bankruptcy filing. Liquidation sales were visible at this time. The former Forever 21 was replaced by Chicago, Illinois-based fashion store Akira, which opened on May 28, 2025. Rally House opened at Arundel Mills in August 2025. This was the company's second location in Maryland.

In October 2025, Toys "R" Us announced it would open a new outlet location in Arundel Mills as part of its plan to open new flagship stores by parent companies WHP Global and Go! Retail Group. The store had its grand opening in November 2025. That month, Arundel Mills celebrated its 25th anniversary, featuring a gallery of the mall from over the years in the Dining Pavilion. The first 250 guests at the November 15 event received commemorative swag bags. Wayfair Outlet replaced MD Furniture and opened at the mall on January 23, 2026, situated in Neighborhood 5 between Old Navy Outlet and Bass Pro Shops. It was Wayfair's first outlet store in the Mid-Atlantic region.

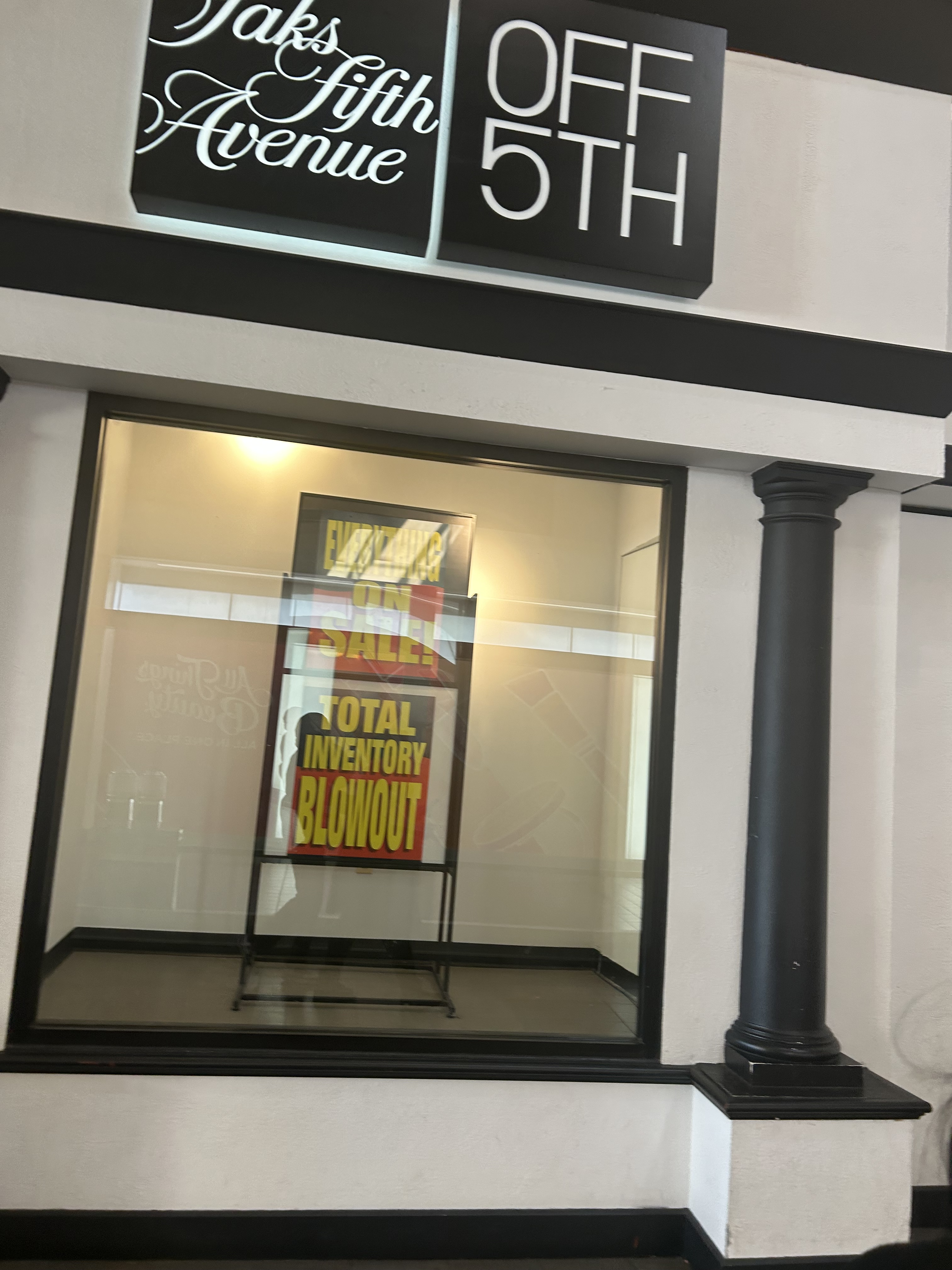
Saks Off 5th at Arundel Mills in March 2026, with a liquidation sign

In February 2026, Saks Off 5th announced that it would close two Maryland stores, one of them at Arundel Mills, by the end of April. The outlet store's parent company, Saks Global, filed for Chapter 11 bankruptcy and announced the closure of multiple Saks Fifth Avenue, Saks Off 5th, and Neiman Marcus stores. As of March 2026, liquidation sales have already been posted on the Arundel Mills Off 5th Saks Fifth Avenue Outlet as seen in the image. That month, Eddie Bauer Outlet announced that it would also close its Arundel Mills location at the end of April, as the retailer filed for Chapter 11 bankruptcy in February 2026 and made the decision to liquidate all North American stores.

Anne Arundel Community College (AACC) at Arundel Mills campus is undergoing building, infrastructure, and technology upgrades as part of its 2026 Facilities Master Plan. On July 8, 2026, Pop Mart announced that they would open their first store in Anne Arundel County at the mall in the summer. On August 10, 2026, the mall held an indoor 5K race inspired by Mario Kart supporting the Boys & Girls Club, with the winner drawing inspiration from MK's Coconut Mall.

=== 2030s and beyond ===
The county's long-term Plan2040 designates the Arundel Mills area as a Critical Economic Area, focusing on further redevelopment and transit-oriented growth through 2030 and beyond.

== Live! Casino & Hotel ==
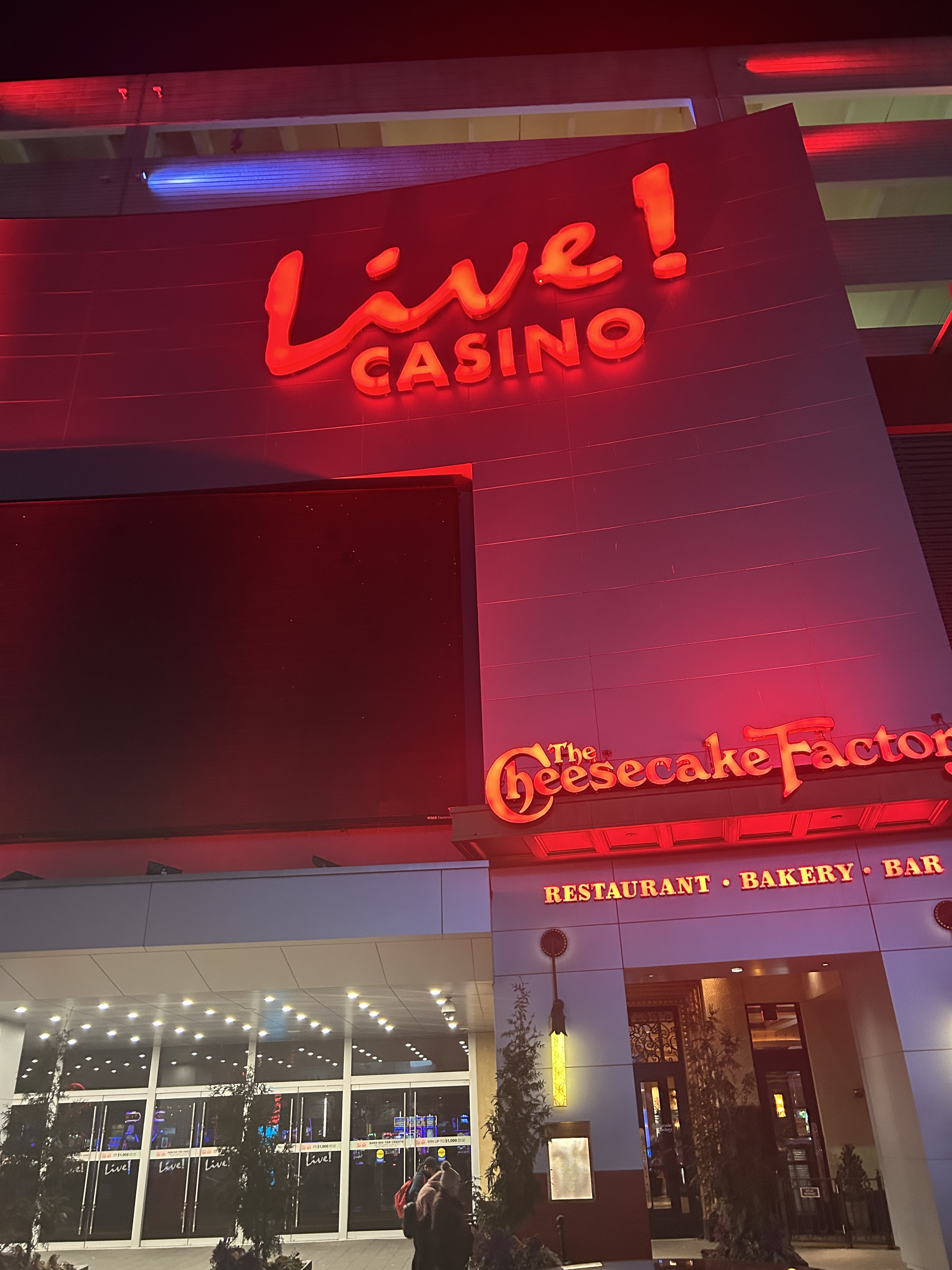
Exterior of the Live! Casino & Hotel at night in March 2026, showing The Cheesecake Factory

After Maryland voters approved slot machine gambling in Maryland in 2008, The Cordish Companies planned a slots parlor next to the mall. The proposal for slots at Arundel Mills was on the ballot as a referendum in the November 2010 elections; the referendum passed, and construction began on the casino shortly afterward, with the grand opening of its first phase held on June 6, 2012. The referendum was required following criticism regarding traffic congestion and parking concerns, which the casino did deliver after its opening. Since full completion in September 2012, Live! Casino & Hotel has about 380,000 sq ft (35,000 m^{2}) of floor space and 4,750 gaming slots.

Live! Casino & Hotel is a free-standing facility, separated from Arundel Mills by the inner mall ring road. Although not directly connected to the mall, the casino is within walking distance of the food court entrance. Live! Casino & Hotel includes a 5,000-space parking structure at Arundel Mills with a "smart park" green-and-red-light space availability feature, such as the system used at nearby BWI Airport. Parking is available free of charge during all mall hours for shoppers.

Live! Casino & Hotel includes several dining options, including The Cheesecake Factory, KOHO Korean BBQ, and a Prime Rib steakhouse. The project was to feature an Obrycki's Crab House and Seafood Restaurant, but the restaurant announced in November 2011 that it would not open a location there. Instead, Phillips Seafood opened a location at the site. Live! Casino & Hotel has a live music venue, operated by Annapolis-based Rams Head, which includes fixed seating for approximately 300 in a cabaret-style design with several stepped viewing levels of the stage. In 2019, The Hall at Live! concert venue officially opened.

== Adjacent properties ==
=== Arundel Mills Marketplace ===
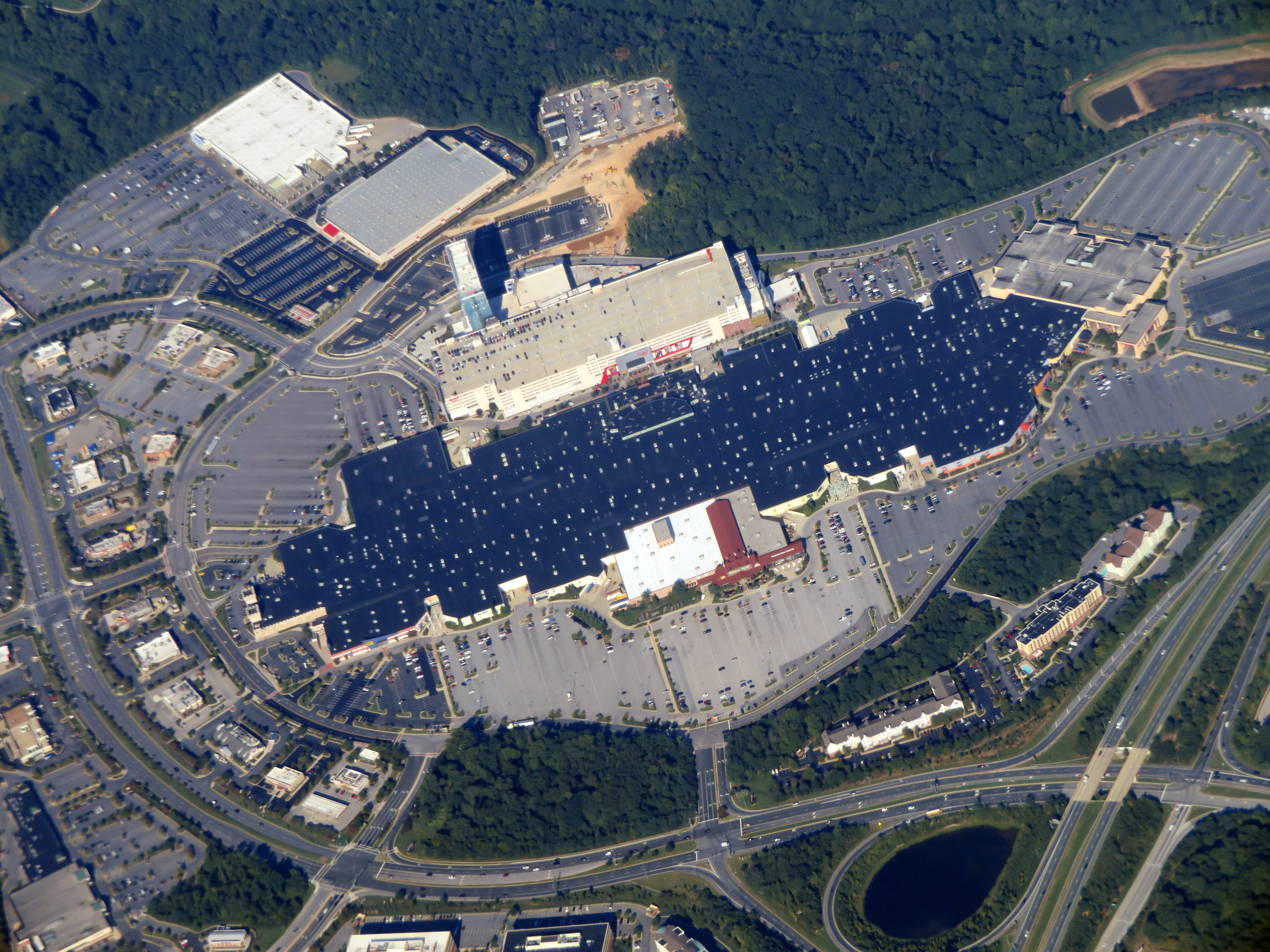
Aerial view of Arundel Mills, the Live! Casino & Hotel and the Arundel Mills Marketplace (September 2018)

Across the street from Arundel Mills is a power center known as Arundel Mills Marketplace at 7663 Arundel Mills Boulevard, which opened in 2003 with three anchors, now having four: PetSmart, Michaels, Staples, and Aldi. This property was also developed by the Mills Corp. and KanAm, and is owned and operated by Simon Property Group.

Arundel Mills Marketplace originally featured a Circuit City consumer electronics store. Circuit City filed for Chapter 7 bankruptcy (originally Chapter 11 in November 2008) and closed all of its stores in March 2009. H. H. Gregg—then seeking to expand its presence in Maryland—took the available location in May 2010, though also filed for bankruptcy and went out of business, closing its Arundel Mills Marketplace store in April 2017. Aldi opened a supermarket there in November 2018.

=== ArundelPreserve ===
Between 2004 and 2005, a five-story Class-A office building known as Arundel Mills Corporate Park (formerly Arundel Mills Corporate Center) opened at 7550 Teague Road, including 300 parking spaces. Unlike the Arundel Mills outlet mall and marketplace, Arundel Mills Corporate Park was developed by Linden Associates, Inc. rather than the Mills Corporation. Arundel Mills Corporate Park itself is a mixed-use development, including retail (The Greene Turtle Sports Bar & Grille), and a five-story hotel. It was designed by RTKL Associates, the same firm that designed the main mall. A second phase was completed in 2009 at 7556 Teague Road.

Arundel Mills Corporate Park is operated by JLL, Linden Associates, Inc., Holland Properties, KLNB, and several other firms. JP2 Architects also designed Arundel Mills Corporate Park. Area hotels include Residence Inn by Marriott Arundel Mills BWI Airport, licensed by Marriott International, and Hilton Garden Inn Hanover Arundel Mills BWI Airport, licensed by Hilton Hotels & Resorts. The Arundel Mills Hilton Hotel was completed in 2009 and constructed by HITT Contracting.

These adjacent properties were made because former Mills Corp. executive and Arundel Mills General Manager/Vice President Gene Condon cited that when Arundel Mills was completed, "there was nothing around it," and that "there were just those 1,200 acres (490 ha) owned by Somerset Construction, which owned most of the land until we bought our 450 acres." The remaining 750 acres (300 ha) were retained by Somerset Construction Co., which partnered with numerous developers that constructed Walmart, Costco, the nearby shopping centers, and seven hotels in the area (formerly four). The reason why Arundel Mills Marketplace was the only adjacent property developed by The Mills Corporation while the other office buildings and hotels were not was because the 450-acre (180 ha) site that was sold to the developers specifically included the 7663 Arundel Mills Blvd site.

A significant portion of the adjacent land (approximately 280 acres or 110 ha) was developed into ArundelPreserve, a mixed-use community featuring office space, housing, and the hotels explained above, by a partnership of developers led by Somerset Construction rather than the Mills Corporation. These plans started in May 2003.

== Notable incidents ==
=== 2023 teen attack ===
Around 10 p.m. EST on December 11, 2023, two male teenagers, aged 14 and 15, were robbed and assaulted by a larger group of teenagers. A gold chain and a watch were taken from the victims, and the suspects escaped in different areas.

The incident fueled Simon's later decision to implement the youth policy starting in September 2024, as it highlighted concerns regarding minors entering the mall without an adult.

=== 2026 shooting ===
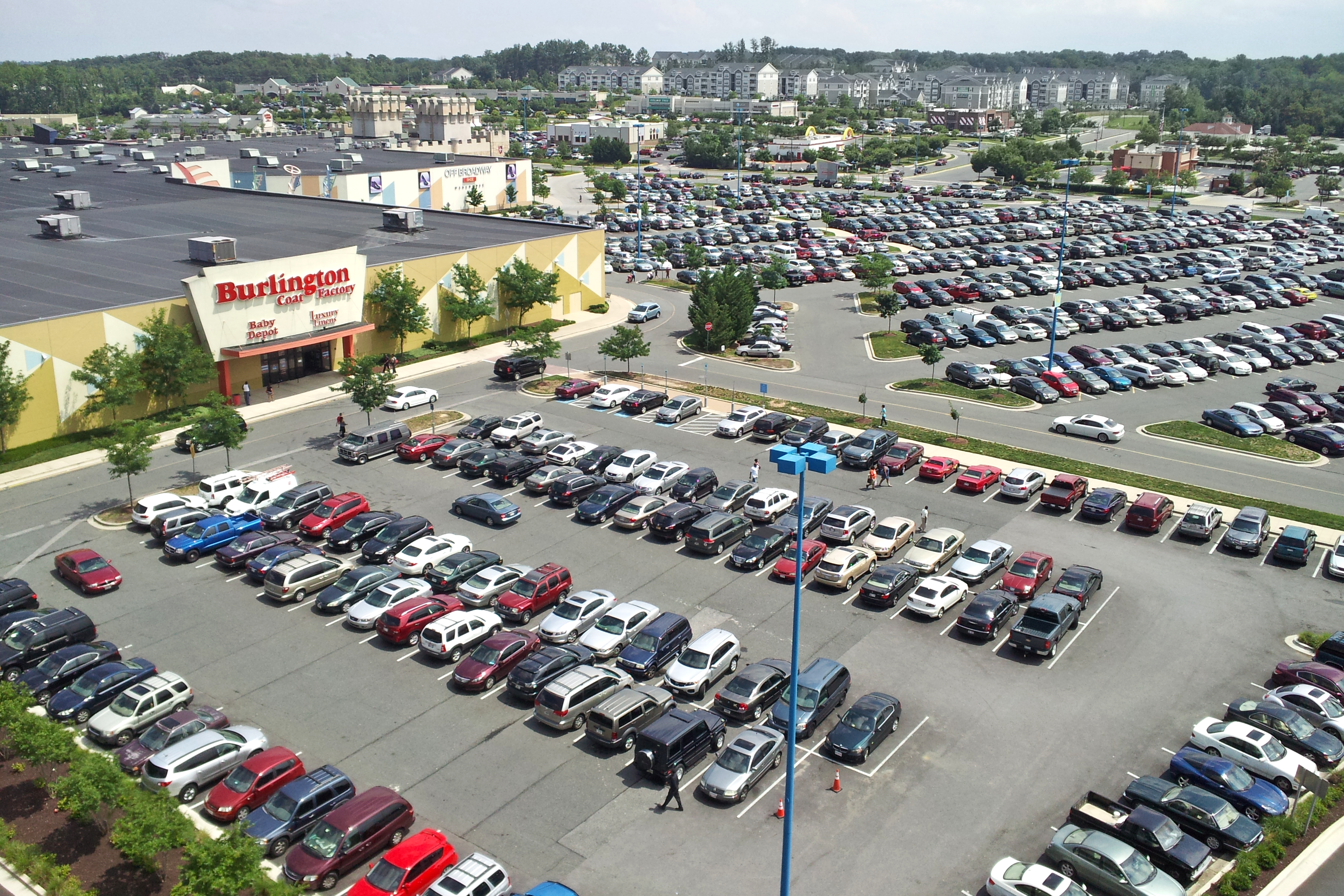
Aerial view of Burlington Coat Factory and the mall's parking lot (June 2013)

At approximately 5 p.m. EDT on March 28, 2026, a gunshot was fired inside the mall near Burlington. According to local police, the three suspects were put in custody after a pursuit into Baltimore County.

Anne Arundel County police spokesman Justin Mulcahy stated that a man leaving the Burlington department store was assaulted by three people before firing a gun, which hit one of the three in a wrist. The suspects fled in a Nissan Altima, which later crashed on Interstate 97. Two of the three assailants suffered non-life-threatening injuries from the crash. On March 30, the requested bail by the suspects was rejected.

== Gallery ==
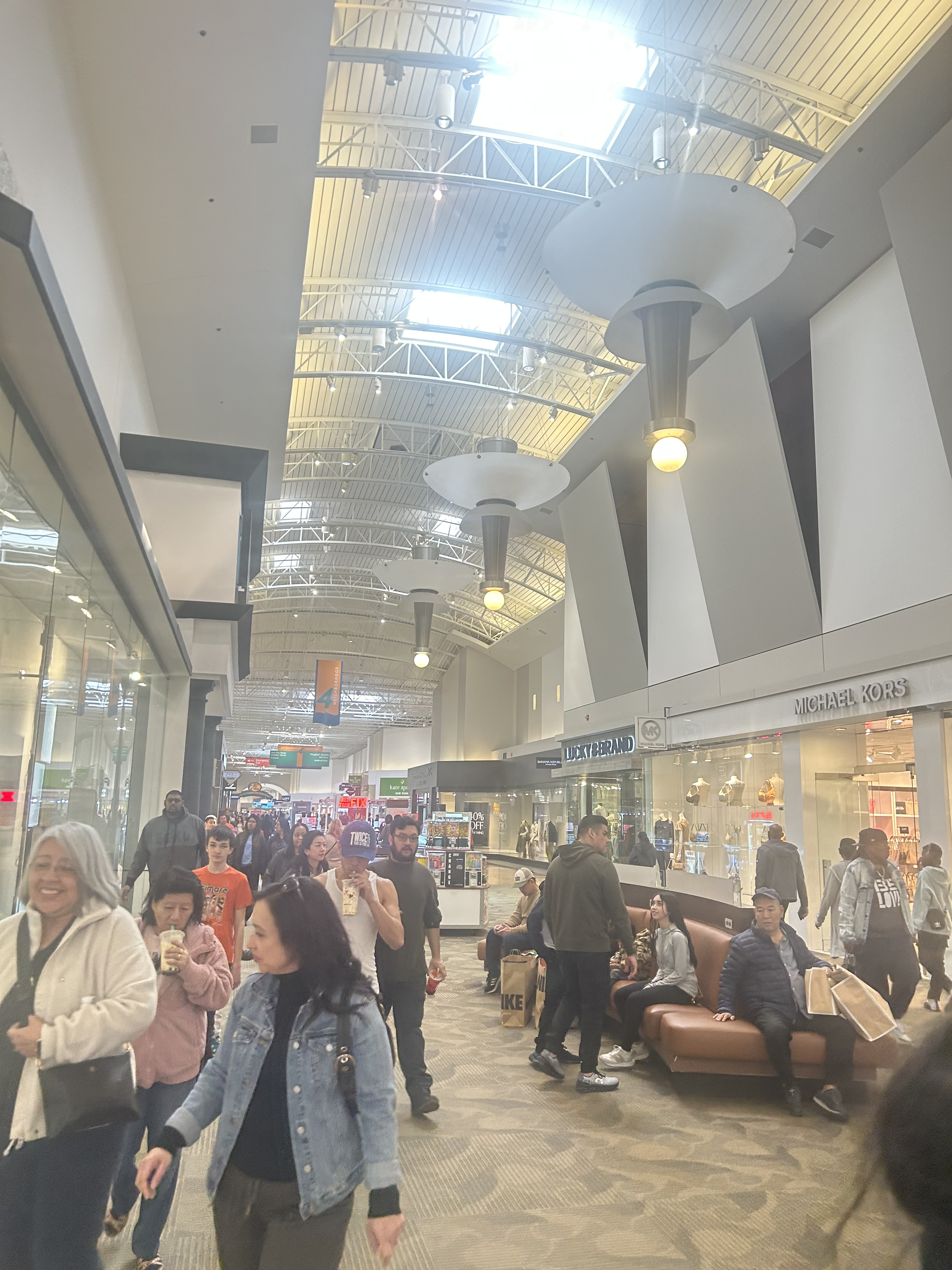
Neighborhood 3 concourse (March 2026)

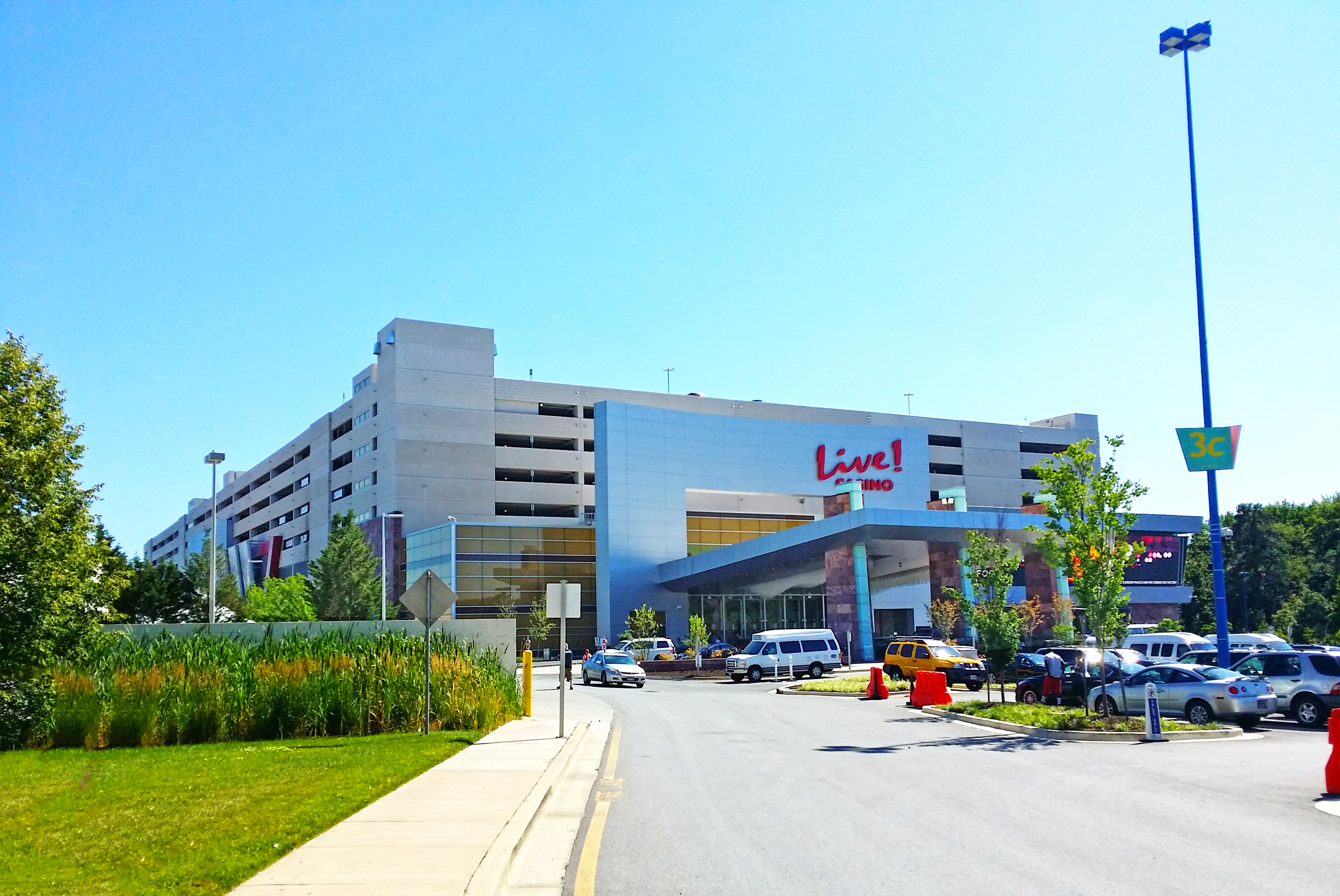
Exterior of Maryland Live! Casino (July 2014)

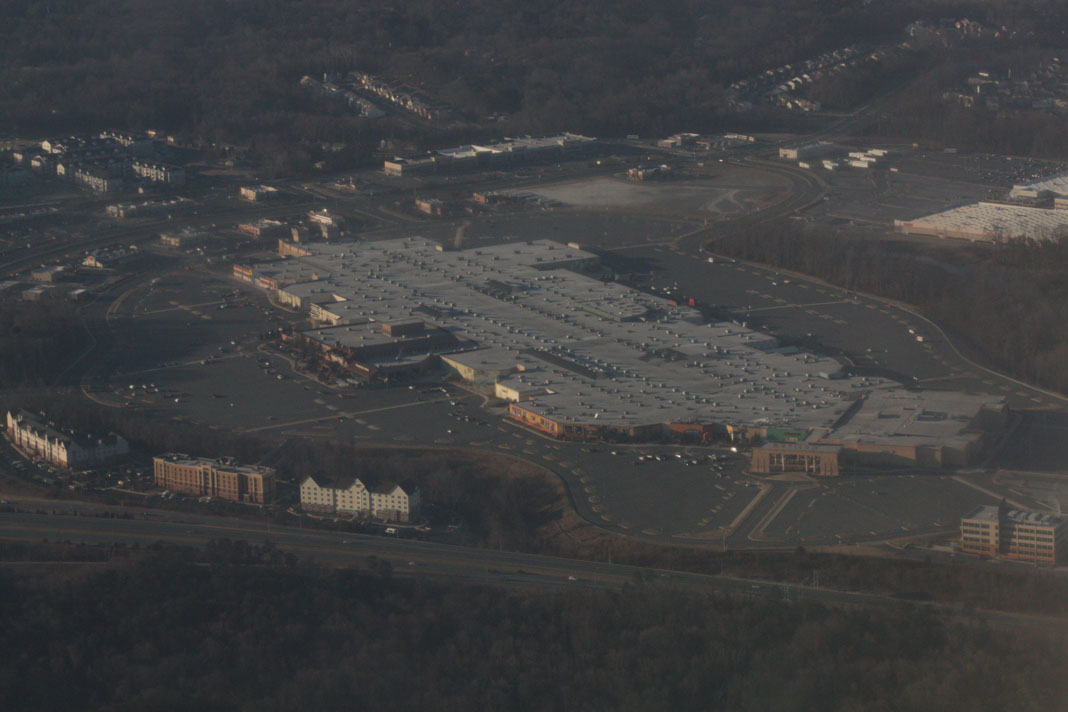
Aerial photograph of the complex prior to the Live! Casino & Hotel in January 2009. Arundel Mills Marketplace is visible in the middle right.

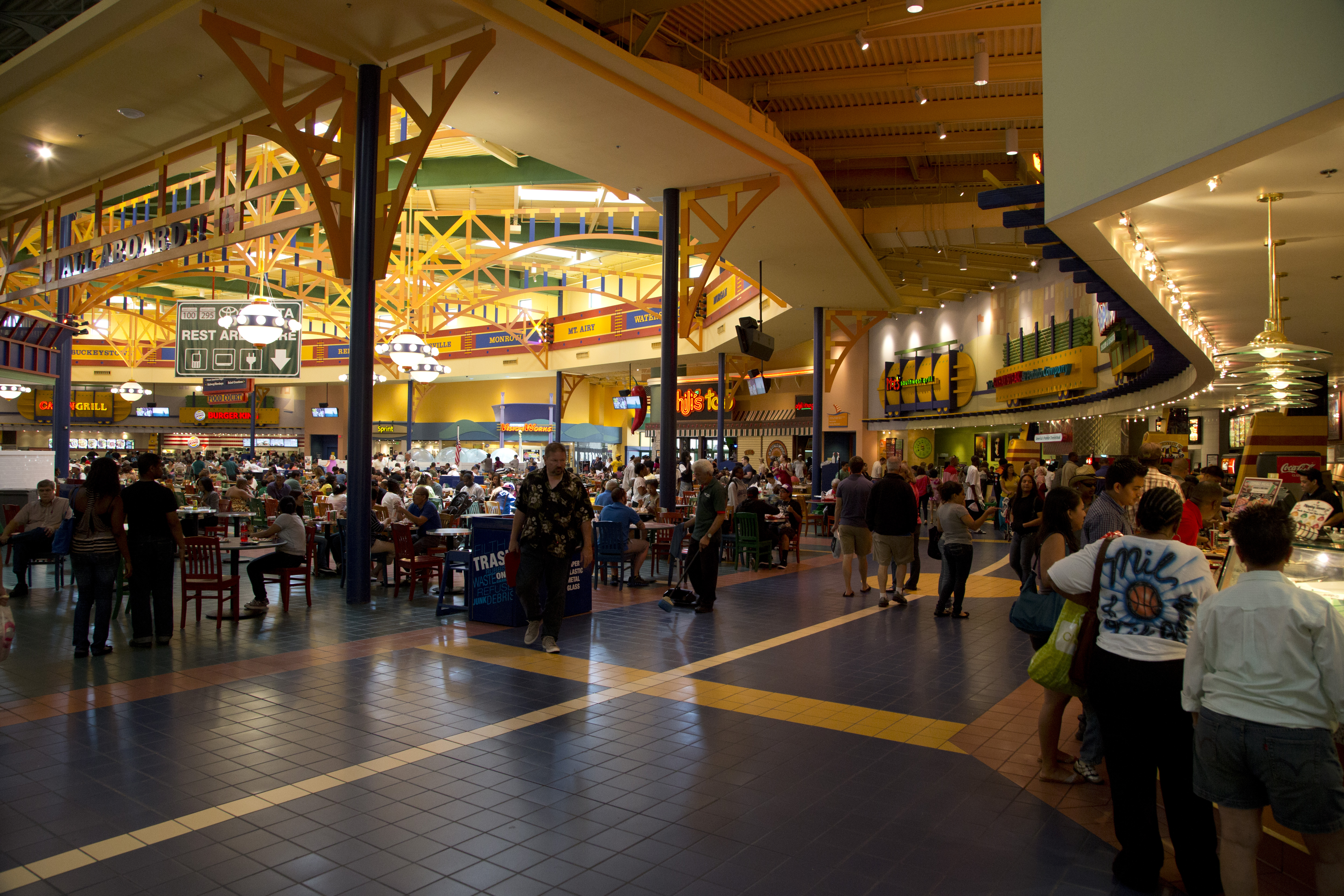
The Roundhouse (June 2012)

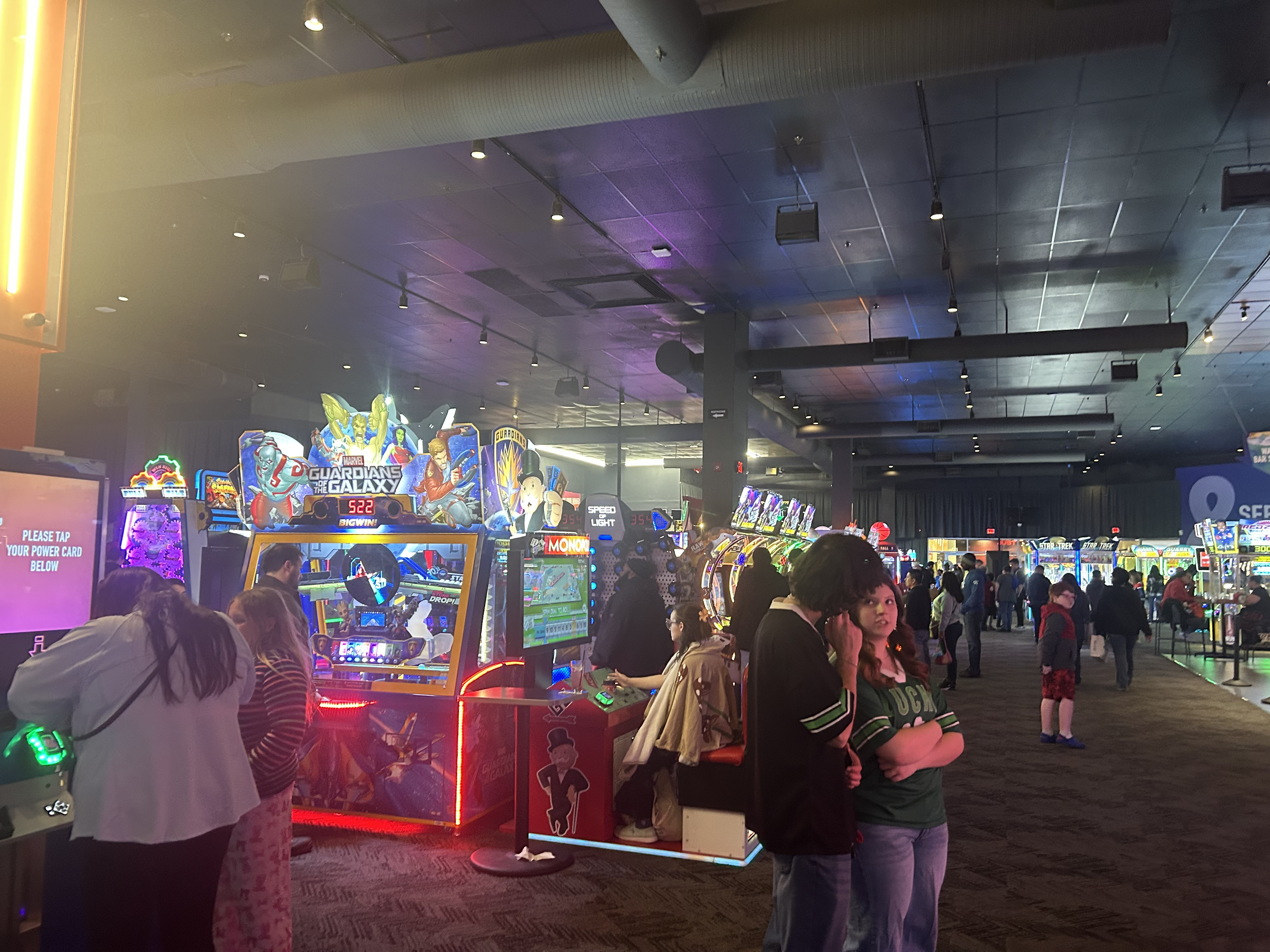
Interior of Dave & Buster's (March 2026)

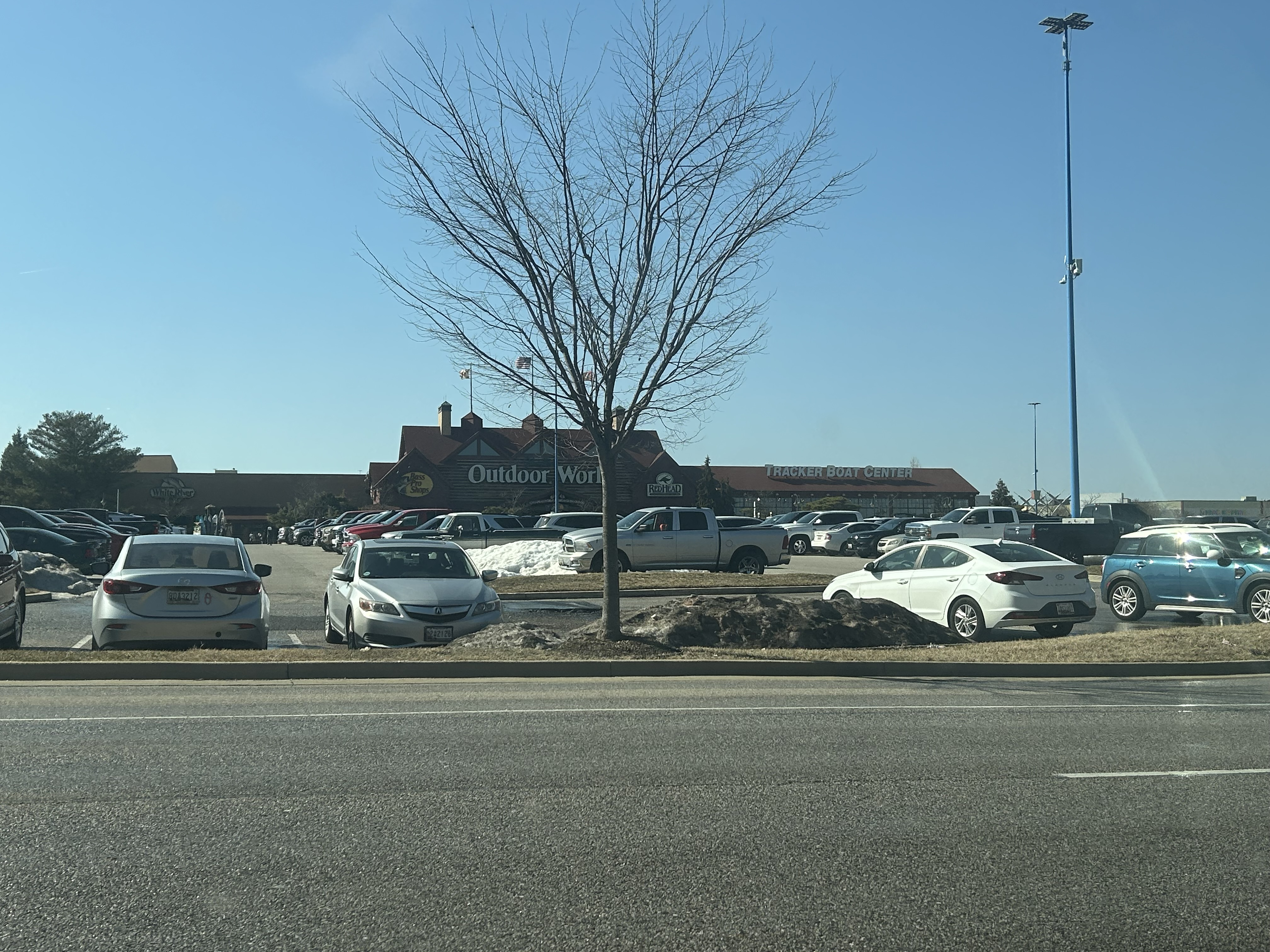
Bass Pro Shops Outdoor World as viewed from the parking lot in March 2026

== See also ==
- Katy Mills, another Landmark Mills mall designed by RTKL
