= Ruth U. Keeton =

Maryland government leader

- Born: Ruth Urice; 1919; Vinton, Iowa, US
- Died: December 14, 1997 (aged 77–78); Columbia, Maryland, US
- Education: Northwestern University
- Known for: Howard County Council member and chair
- Political party: Democratic
- Spouse: Morris Keeton (1916 or 1917–2014; m. 1944–1997, her death)
- Children: 3

Ruth Urice Keeton (1919 – December 14, 1997) was a member and chairperson of the Howard County Council in Maryland. In addition to this elected office, she was appointed to serve with multiple state committees including the Baltimore Regional Transportation Committee and Housing Task Force.

== Early life ==
Ruth Urice was born in Vinton, Iowa, in 1919 to Mr. and Mrs. Logan Urice. Her father later retired as the postmaster of Vinton and her mother had a master's degree in home economics. She had two brothers, Logan Jr. and Kadel, and a sister, Mrs. John Drilling. Ruth attended Northwestern University in the latter 1930s and graduated as a Phi Beta Kappa member. She met Morris Keeton outside Chicago in 1943 and they married in 1944. Early in their relationship, Ruth and Morris manned an inter-racial work camp for their Quaker church in Chicago, intended to break down racial discrimination.

== Antioch College ==
The couple moved to Yellow Springs, Ohio, in 1947 when Morris began a 30-year tenure with Antioch College. Morris taught in Germany in the mid-1950s while Ruth worked abroad for the American Friends Service Committee. During this time in August 1954, Ruth's mother died in an airplane crash in Iowa. In 1969, the Keetons moved to Maryland where Morris helped form an Antioch College campus in Columbia with James Rouse.

== Public service ==
From 1975 to 1988, Keeton was a member of the Howard County Council, running on a slate of Columbia residents sponsored by the Columbia Democratic Club including Ginny Thomas, Lloyd Knowles and Richard Anderson. Keeton served as council chair from 1979 to 1984, and championed community causes such as affordable housing. In 1981, Governor Harry Hughes appointed Keeton to the Maryland State Housing task force. She was a member of the Patuxent River Commission which produced a land management plan for the river's watershed in 1984.

== Illness, death, and legacy ==
In 1988, Keeton told her husband that she was starting to forget street names. Eventually diagnosed with Alzheimer's disease, she was cared for by her husband and died in her home on December 14, 1997. When she left public service for health reasons eight years prior, Howard County leaders dedicated a room with her name in Columbia's Harper's Choice community center. The Ruth Keeton House was also established nearby, on Ruth Keeton Way, to provide assisted living for disabled elderly people. The Keetons raised two sons, Gary and Scot, and a daughter, Joan. Morris died on April 10, 2014, at age 97.
