= Towne Centre at Laurel =

Shopping center in Laurel, Maryland, U.S.

Coordinates: 39°5′38.21″N 76°51′27.22″W

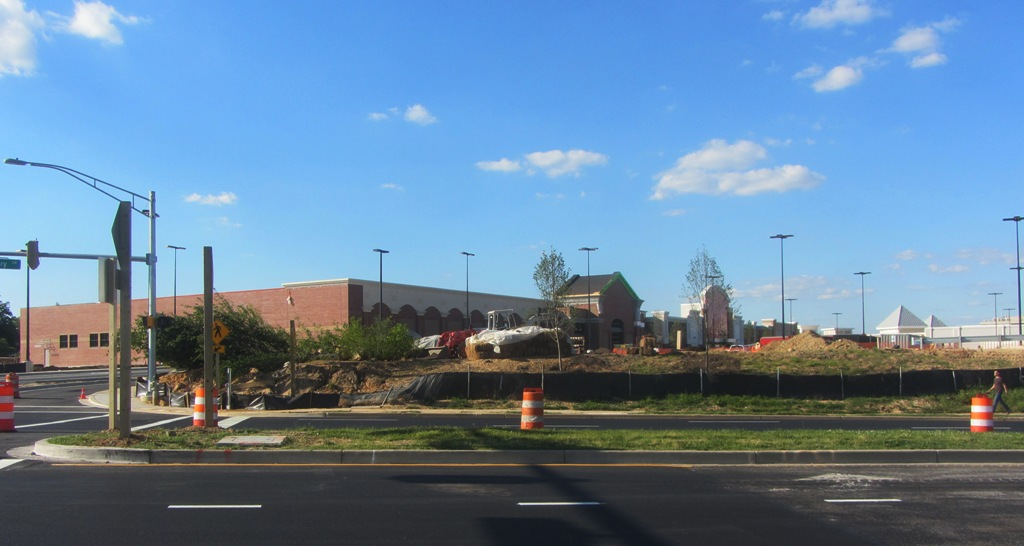
- A portion of the shopping center, under construction in June 2014
- Address: 14828 Baltimore Avenue; Laurel, Maryland 20707
- Opened: 2014
- Developer: Greenberg Gibbons
- Manager: Greenberg Gibbons
- Owner: Greenberg Gibbons
- Num. of anchor tenants: 5
- Floor area: 400,000 square feet (37,000 m^{2})
- Public transit: RTA Central Maryland bus: 301/A, 302/G, 409/Purple, 502/B, 503/E; Metrobus: M52, P12
- Website: visittcl.com

Towne Centre at Laurel is a shopping center in Laurel, Maryland. It was built on the former site of Laurel Mall.

== History ==
On August 14, 2012, the city of Laurel hosted a groundbreaking ceremony to begin destruction of the former Laurel Mall. As of October 12, 2012, all of the parking garage on the U.S. Route 1 side of the mall had been demolished, and interior demolition of the mall had begun. A Burlington Coat Factory (former Montgomery Ward) building was demolished in July 2013; it was the last remaining portion of the former mall.

Burlington Coat Factory was also the first store to open in the new facility, in April 2014. The center's Harris Teeter was the first store of its chain to open in Prince George's County. A "grand opening" was held in November 2014.

== Stores and attractions ==
Town Center at Laurel is anchored by Burlington Coat Factory, Harris Teeter, Old Navy, Party City, and Regal Cinemas. The shopping center has many specialty shops and restaurants, and as of May 2015 was soon to include a U.S. Post Office.

The parking deck behind Burlington Coat Factory has a capacity of 612 cars.
