= Johns Hopkins Howard County Medical Center =

Hospital in Columbia, Maryland, US

- Johns Hopkins Medicine

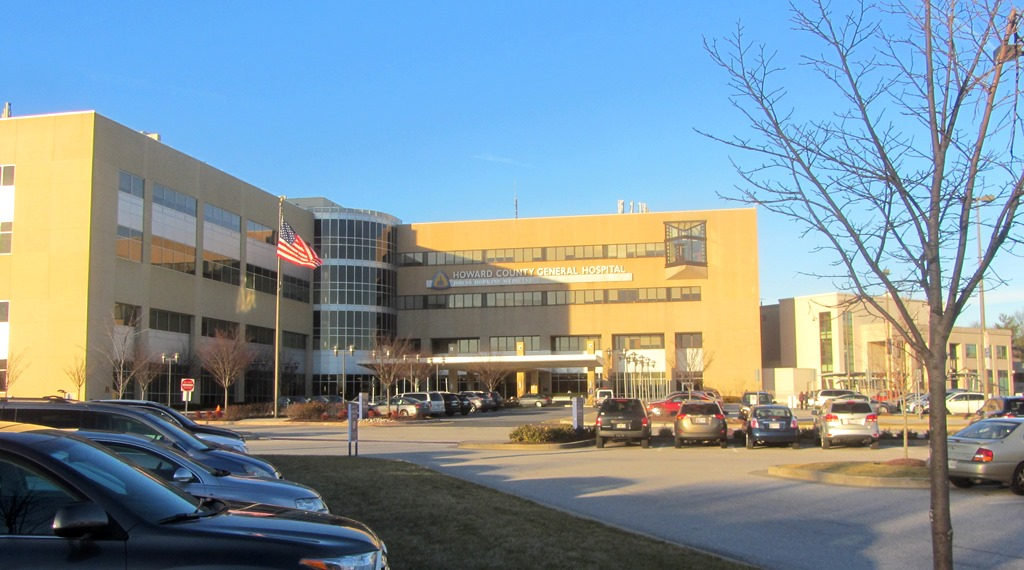

Geography
- Location: Columbia, Maryland, United States
- Coordinates: 39°12′46″N 76°53′7″W

Organization
- Affiliated university: Johns Hopkins Medicine

Services
- Beds: 225

History
- Founded: 1973

Links
- Website: www.hcgh.org
- Lists: Hospitals in Maryland

Johns Hopkins Howard County Medical Center is a 225-bed, not-for-profit health care provider located in Columbia, Maryland.

== History ==
Prior to the construction of Howard County General, most emergency services were provided outside Howard County. Baltimore and Montgomery General Hospital opened in 1920. With the rapid increase in population anticipated from the Rouse Company development he approved, County Commissioner Charles E. Miller attempted to redevelop his family's Historic Gray Rock farm in Ellicott City to build a 200-bed Lutheran Hospital and housing development. Despite multiple attempts, the zoning for the hospital was not approved as competition for the proposed Howard County General project. In addition, the State declined another 1973 proposal to build a 200-bed unit in Ellicott City by Bon Secours for refusing to service abortions as a Catholic hospital.

Howard County General Hospital: A Member of Johns Hopkins Medicine is a not-for-profit health care provider with 225 licensed beds located in Columbia, Maryland. A comprehensive, acute-care medical center, Howard County General offers a full range of services specializing in women's and children's services, surgery, cardiology, oncology, orthopedics, gerontology, psychiatry, emergency services, and community health education.

The hospital has a professional staff of more than 950 physicians and allied health professionals, representing nearly 100 specialties and subspecialties; a workforce of more than 1,900 individuals and more than 300 volunteers.

In 2009, the hospital opened a $105 million, four-story, five-level patient pavilion with three inpatient floors as well as the Bolduc Family Outpatient Center. In 2014, the Health Care and Surgery Center Building was renamed to the Dr. Sanford A. Berman and Dr. Kay Ota-Berman Pavilion after a $5 million donation.

The hospital is situated on a prehistoric Native American settlement later settled as farmland. Benjamin F. Bassler exchanged 92 acres (37 ha) of his fathers 400-acre (160 ha) family farm and airfield to The Rouse Company in exchange for a 504-acre (204 ha) farm to create Haysfield Airport. A hospital was proposed for the development as two others sought State and County approval. The 59 bed Columbia Hospital and Clinic Foundations Center was opened on July 9, 1973 serving members of the Columbia Medical Plan only. The Columbia Medical Plan was an early HMO created by the Rouse Corporation in conjunction with Columbia's chief backer and financier Connecticut General Life Insurance and Johns Hopkins, which initially discouraged private practices that would form competition. The hospital was an early adopter, integrating psychiatric admissions with regular admissions. After a year of operations, the facility was opened to residents outside the Columbia Medical Plan, with the new name Howard County General Hospital. Within the first three years, the hospital was rated the second most expensive in the state and faced budget cuts after cost overruns and unpaid debt.

On June 12, 2023 the facility changed its name from Howard County General Hospital to Johns Hopkins Howard County Medical Center. The name change, coming on the 50th anniversary of the hospital and the 25th anniversary as a member institution of Johns Hopkins medicine, reflects "the organization’s continuing integration and growth within Johns Hopkins Medicine."
