= List of MARC Train stations =

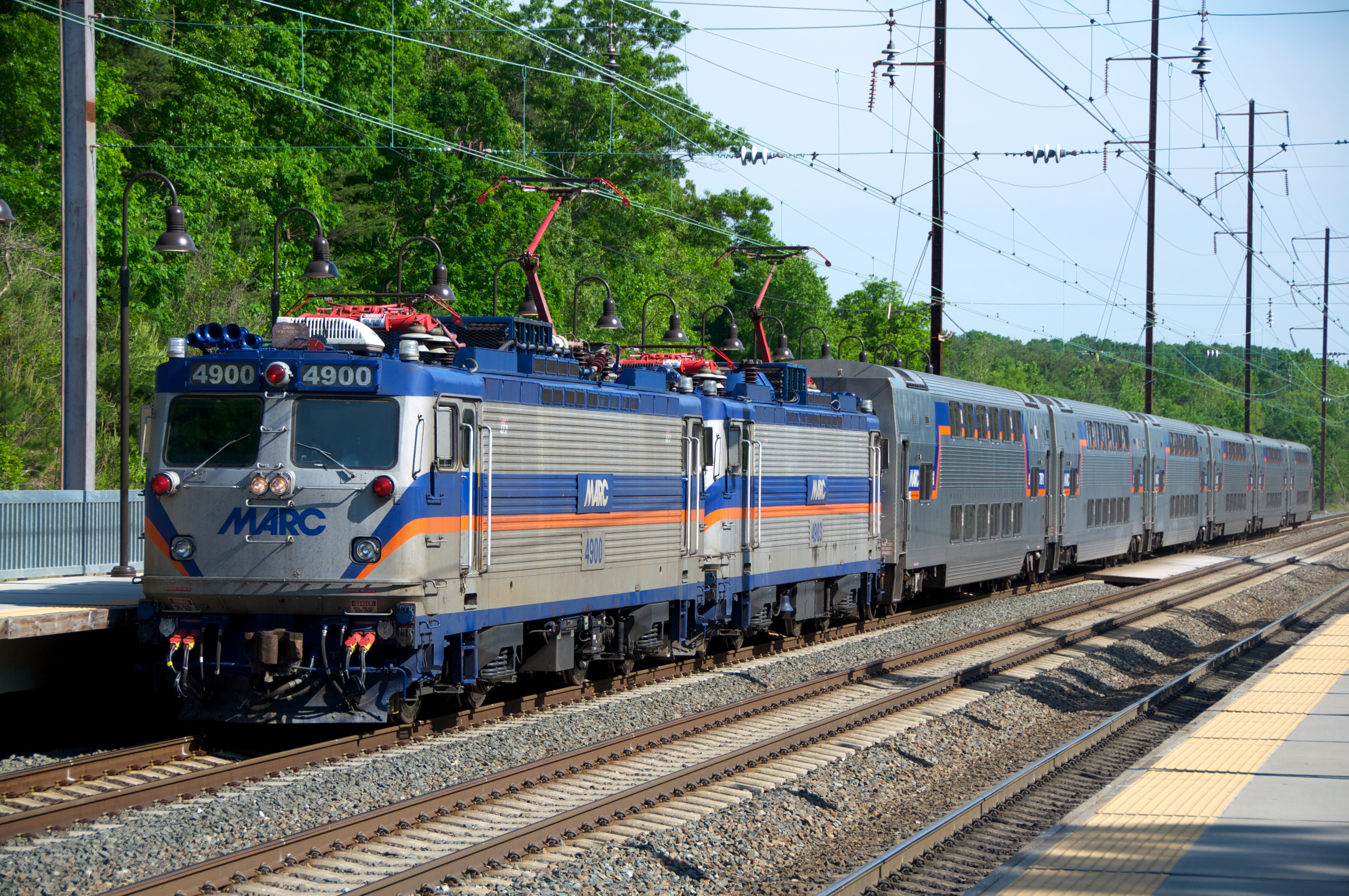
MARC Train service at BWI Rail Station in Maryland

MARC Train is the commuter rail system serving the Baltimore–Washington metropolitan area in the United States. The system is owned by the Maryland Transit Administration (MTA Maryland), and serves Maryland, Washington, D.C., and West Virginia. The system covers a total route length of 198.2 miles (319.0 km) along three rail lines. In the 2019 fiscal year, MARC Train service had average weekday ridership of 36,375 passengers.

State-supported commuter rail operations in Maryland began in 1974 when the Maryland Department of Transportation (Maryland DOT) funded train services from Washington, D.C. along the Baltimore and Ohio Railroad, later owned by CSX Transportation. The following year, in 1975, Maryland DOT began funding operations on the Conrail-owned Northeast Corridor, whose ownership was transferred to Amtrak in 1983. Following a marketing study in 1984, the Maryland-funded commuter rail service was branded as MARC (Maryland Area Rail Commuter).

Current MARC Train service includes the Penn Line (operated on Amtrak's Northeast Corridor), the Camden Line (operated on CSX's Capital Subdivision), and the Brunswick Line (operated on CSX's Cumberland, Metropolitan, and Old Main Line Subdivisions, with limited service along the Frederick Branch). There are 42 MARC Train stations in the commuter rail system; all three lines terminate at Union Station in Washington, D.C, where passengers can connect with Amtrak, Virginia Railway Express, and Washington Metro trains. Development of a new MARC station at the former Amtrak station in Elkton, Maryland began in 2014, with plans to open by 2040.

== Lines ==
MARC Train lines
Line	Inbound terminus	Outbound terminus	Stations	Route length	Owner	Operator	Daily ridership (2019)
Brunswick Line	Union Station	Frederick or Martinsburg	19	85.0 miles (136.8 km)	CSX	Bombardier	7,392
Camden Line	Union Station	Camden Station	12	36.6 miles (58.9 km)	CSX	Bombardier	5,075
Penn Line	Union Station	Perryville	13	76.6 miles (123.3 km)	Amtrak	Amtrak	23,908

== Stations ==
All stations located in Maryland, unless otherwise noted.

MARC Train stations
Station	Line	Rail connections	Location
Aberdeen	Penn Line	Amtrak: Northeast Regional	Aberdeen
Barnesville	Brunswick Line	—N/a	Barnesville
Bowie State	Penn Line	—N/a	Bowie
Boyds	Brunswick Line	—N/a	Boyds
Brunswick	Brunswick Line	—N/a	Brunswick
BWI Airport	Penn Line	Amtrak: Acela, Crescent, Northeast Regional, Palmetto, Vermonter	Linthicum
Camden Station	Camden Line	Light RailLink	Baltimore
College Park	Camden Line	Washington Metro: Green Line, Yellow Line	College Park
Dickerson	Brunswick Line	—N/a	Dickerson
Dorsey	Camden Line	—N/a	Elkridge
Duffields	Brunswick Line	—N/a	Duffields, WV
Edgewood	Penn Line	—N/a	Edgewood
Frederick	Brunswick Line	—N/a	Frederick
Gaithersburg	Brunswick Line	—N/a	Gaithersburg
Garrett Park	Brunswick Line	—N/a	Garrett Park
Germantown	Brunswick Line	—N/a	Germantown
Greenbelt	Camden Line	Washington Metro: Green Line, Yellow Line	Greenbelt
Halethorpe	Penn Line	—N/a	Baltimore
Harpers Ferry	Brunswick Line	Amtrak: Floridian	Harpers Ferry, WV
Jessup	Camden Line	—N/a	Jessup
Kensington	Brunswick Line	—N/a	Kensington
Laurel	Camden Line	—N/a	Laurel
Laurel Racetrack	Camden Line	—N/a	Laurel
Martin State Airport	Penn Line	—N/a	Middle River
Martinsburg	Brunswick Line	Amtrak: Floridian	Martinsburg, WV
Metropolitan Grove	Brunswick Line	—N/a	Gaithersburg
Monocacy	Brunswick Line	—N/a	Frederick
Muirkirk	Camden Line	—N/a	Beltsville
New Carrollton	Penn Line	Amtrak: Northeast Regional, Palmetto, Vermonter; Washington Metro: Orange Line, Silver Line	New Carrollton
Odenton	Penn Line	—N/a	Odenton
Penn Station	Penn Line	Amtrak: Northeast Corridor (all lines); Light RailLink	Baltimore
Perryville	Penn Line	—N/a	Perryville
Point of Rocks	Brunswick Line	—N/a	Point of Rocks
Riverdale	Camden Line	—N/a	Riverdale
Rockville	Brunswick Line	Amtrak: Floridian; Washington Metro: Red Line	Rockville
Savage	Camden Line	—N/a	Annapolis Junction
Seabrook	Penn Line	—N/a	Lanham
Silver Spring	Brunswick Line	Washington Metro Red Line	Silver Spring
St. Denis	Camden Line	—N/a	Baltimore
Union Station	Brunswick Line Camden Line Penn Line	Amtrak: Floridian, Northeast Corridor (all lines); VRE: ■ Fredericksburg Line, ■ Manassas Line; Washington Metro: Red Line	Washington, D.C.
Washington Grove	Brunswick Line	—N/a	Washington Grove
West Baltimore	Penn Line	—N/a	Baltimore

== Former stations ==
This list includes stations abandoned since the beginning of public subsidies in the mid 1970s.

Station	Line	Closure date	Location	Notes
Berwyn	Camden Line	January 31, 1994	Berwyn	Closed due to low ridership
Bowie	Penn Line	February 27, 1989	Bowie	Replaced by Bowie State station
Capital Beltway	Penn Line	October 1983	Lanham	Replaced by New Carrollton station
Edmondson Avenue	Penn Line	April 27, 1984	West Baltimore	Replaced with West Baltimore station
Elkridge	Camden Line	July 1996	Elkridge	Replaced by Dorsey station
Frederick Road	Penn Line	April 27, 1984	Baltimore	
Hyattsville	Camden Line	1980s	Hyattsville	
Jericho Park	Penn Line	June 26, 1981	Bowie	Bowie State station opened on the same site in 1989
Landover	Penn Line	August 1982	Landover	Service moved to Amtrak's Capital Beltway station
Lanham	Penn Line	August 1982	Lanham	Service moved to Amtrak's Capital Beltway station
Silver Spring	Brunswick Line	2000	Silver Spring	Replaced with new MARC platforms at the Silver Spring Metro station
