= Camden =

Camden may refer to:

== People ==
- Camden (surname), a surname of English origin
- Camden Brown (born 2004), American football player
- Camden Cox (born 1990), English electronic dance musician
- Camden Heide (born 2003), American basketball player
- Camden Joy (born 1964), American writer
- Camden Minacci (born 2002), American baseball player
- Camden Pulkinen (born 2000), American figure skater
- Camden Toy (born 1957), American actor

== Peerages ==
- Baron Camden
- Earl Camden
- Marquess Camden

== Places ==
=== Australia ===
- Camden, New South Wales
- Camden, Rosehill, a heritage residence, NSW
  - Camden Airport (New South Wales)
  - Camden Council (New South Wales)
  - Electoral district of Camden

=== Canada ===
- Camden, Nova Scotia
- Camden East, Ontario

=== England ===
- London Borough of Camden
  - Camden Town, an area in the borough
  - Camden (electoral division), Greater London Council
  - Camden markets
  - Camden School for Girls

=== Ireland ===
- Camden Fort Meagher in Cork Harbour
- Camden Street, Dublin

=== United States ===
- Camden, Alabama
- Camden, Arkansas
- Camden, Delaware
- Camden, Illinois
- Camden, Indiana
- Camden, Maine, a town
  - Camden (CDP), Maine, a census-designated place within the town
- Camden, Michigan
- Camden, Minneapolis, Minnesota, a community comprising several neighborhoods
- Camden, Mississippi
- Camden, Missouri
- Camden, New Jersey, the largest U.S. city named Camden
  - Port of Camden
- Camden (town), New York
  - Camden (village), New York
- Camden, North Carolina
- Camden, Ohio, in Preble County
- Camden, South Carolina
  - Battle of Camden, an engagement during the American Revolutionary War
  - Camden (Amtrak station)
- Camden, Tennessee
- Camden, Texas
- Camden (Port Royal, Virginia), a historic house

== Fictional ==
- Camden House, in Arthur Conan Doyle's 1903 short story "The Adventure of the Empty House"
- The Camdens, a family in the TV drama 7th Heaven
- Camden County, in the TV series My Name Is Earl
- Camden Falls, Massachusetts, the fictional setting of Ann. M. Martin's book series Main Street

== U.S. Navy vessels ==
- USS Camden (AS-6), a submarine tender, later a barracks ship
- USS Camden (AOE-2), combat support ship 1967-2005

== Other uses ==
- Camden (album)
- RCA Camden, a budget record label used by RCA Records

== See also ==
- Camden College (disambiguation)
- Camden County (disambiguation)
- Camden Football Club (disambiguation)
- Camden Point, Missouri
- Camden Station, Baltimore, Maryland, U.S.
- Camden Township (disambiguation)
- Oriole Park at Camden Yards
- Camden House Publishing, founded in 1979
- Camden Property Trust
- Camden Society
