= Dorsey station =

Railway station in Howard County, Maryland, US

Dorsey
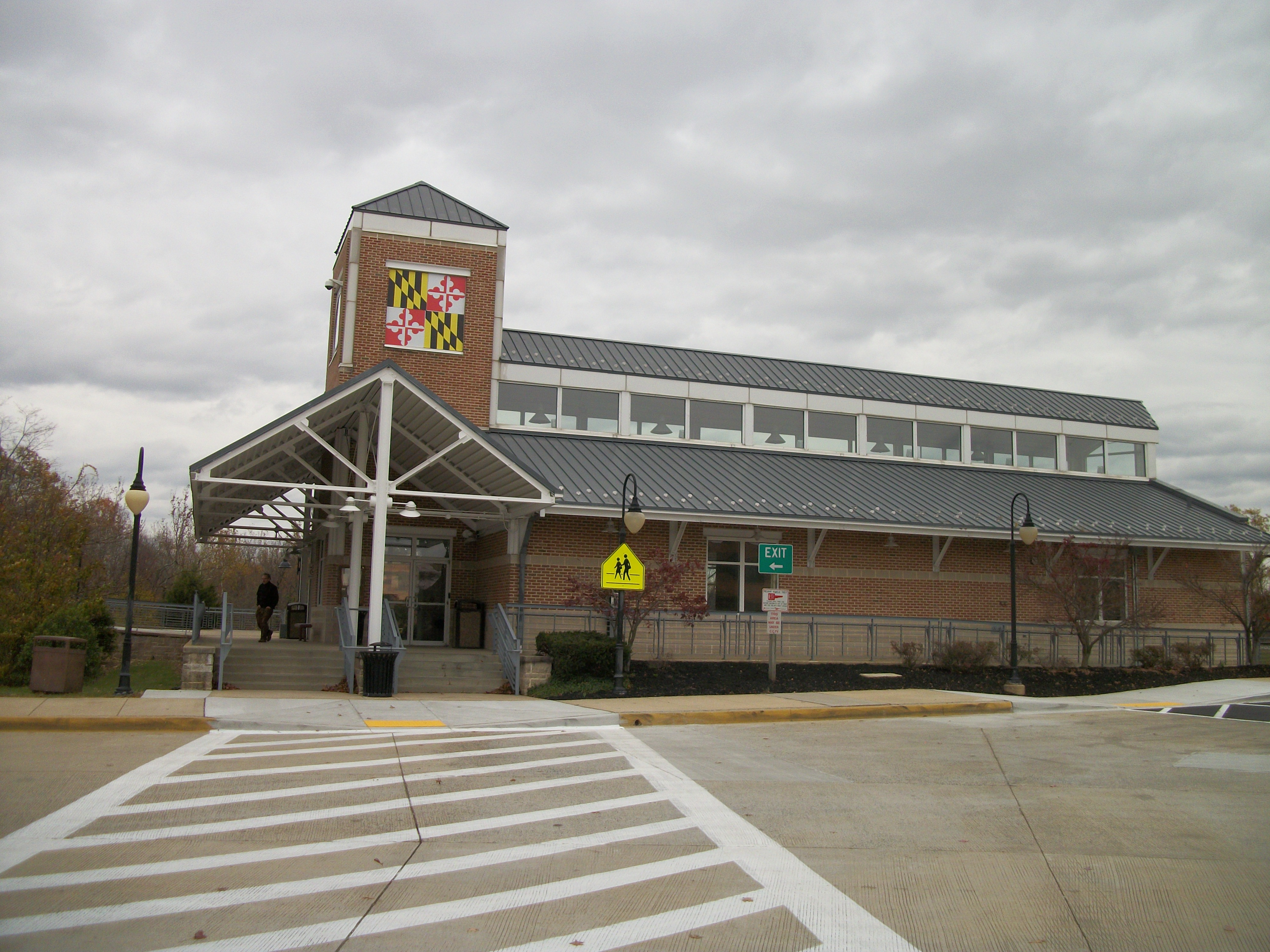
- Dorsey station house

General information
- Location: 7000 Deerpath Road; Dorsey, Maryland
- Coordinates: 39°10′52″N 76°44′45″W
- Owner: Maryland Transit Administration
- Line: CSX Capital Subdivision
- Platforms: 2 side platforms
- Tracks: 2
- Connections: MTA BaltimoreLink: 201; RTA: 501

Construction
- Parking: 802 spaces
- Accessible: Yes

History
- Opened: 1996

Passengers
- 2018: 585 daily ▲3.5%

Services
Preceding station	MARC	Following station
Savage toward Union Station	Camden Line	St. Denis toward Camden Station
Jessup Limited service toward Union Station	Camden Line	St. Denis toward Camden Station
Former services
Preceding station	Baltimore and Ohio Railroad	Following station
Jessup toward Chicago	Main Line	St. Denis toward Jersey City
Montevideo toward Chicago	Main Line	Harwood toward Jersey City
Location

Dorsey station is a passenger rail station on the MARC Camden Line between Washington, DC and Baltimore's Camden Station in Dorsey, Maryland. The station is located at Exit 7 on Maryland Route 100, a.k.a.; the Paul T. Pitcher Memorial Highway. It was built by MARC in 1996 as a replacement for a former Baltimore and Ohio Railroad station located on Route 103 east of Station House Drive. The former B&O station site is now a condominium development.

== Connections ==
- MTA Commuter Bus 201: Dorsey Station to BWI Rail Station
- RTA 501: The Mall in Columbia to Arundel Mills Mall

== Nearby places and attractions ==
- Elkridge, Maryland
- Ellicott City, Maryland
- UMUC Dorsey Station Campus
- Arundel Mills Mall
- Troy Park
- Oxford Square
- Troy Hill Business Park

== Station layout ==
The station has two side platforms with a station house on the southbound platform. The station is compliant with the Americans with Disabilities Act of 1990.
