= Riverdale Park Town Center station =

Passenger rail station on the MARC Camden Line

Riverdale
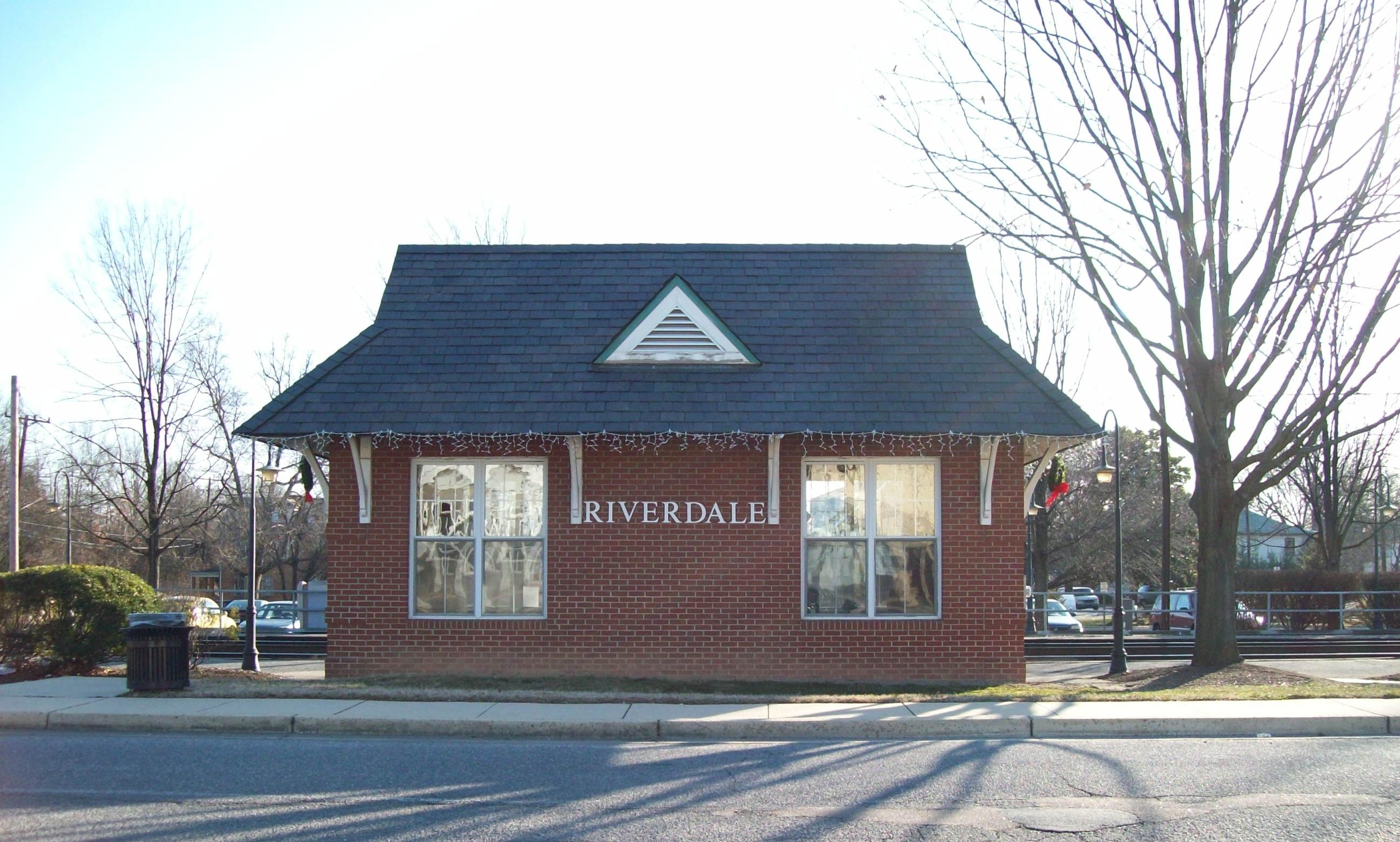
- Riverdale station in December 2008

General information
- Location: 6200 Rhode Island Avenue; Riverdale Park, Maryland
- Coordinates: 38.9630°N 76.9350°W
- Line: Capital Subdivision
- Platforms: 2 side platforms
- Tracks: 2
- Connections: Metrobus: P30, P35; Rhode Island Avenue Trolley Trail

Construction
- Parking: 94 spaces
- Accessible: No

Passengers
- 2018: 73 daily 0% (MARC)

Services
Preceding station	MARC	Following station
Union Station Terminus	Camden Line	College Park toward Camden Station
Former services
Preceding station	Baltimore and Ohio Railroad	Following station
Washington, D.C. toward Chicago	Main Line	Muirkirk toward Jersey City
Hyattsville toward Chicago	Main Line	College Park toward Jersey City
Location

Riverdale Park Town Center station (also called Riverdale station) is a passenger rail station on the MARC Camden Line between Union Station in Washington, DC and Baltimore's Camden Station. The station is part of the Riverdale Park Historic District, which has been part of the National Register of Historic Places since 2002.

== Station layout ==
The station has two side platforms and small parking lots on either side of the tracks. The station is not compliant with the Americans with Disabilities Act of 1990.
