= Laurel station (MARC) =

Historic passenger rail station on the MARC Camden Line in Laurel, Maryland, U.S.

Laurel
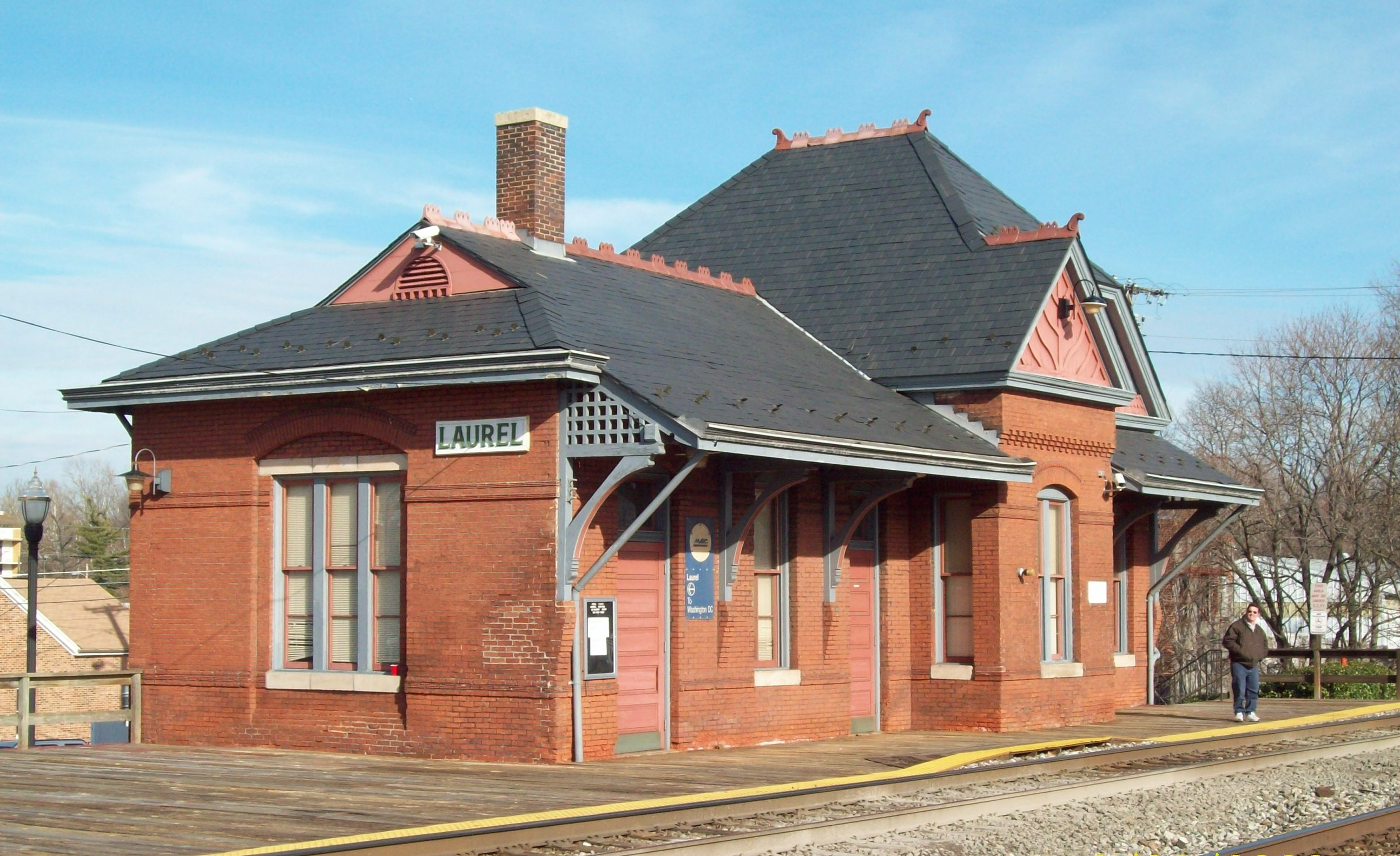
- Laurel station in December 2008

General information
- Location: 22 Main Street; Laurel, Maryland
- Coordinates: 39°6′9″N 76°50′30″W
- Line: Capital Subdivision
- Platforms: 2 side platforms
- Tracks: 2
- Connections: Metrobus: P12; RTA 409

Construction
- Parking: 396 spaces
- Cycle facilities: Yes; 10 lockers
- Accessible: Yes

History
- Opened: 1884

Passengers
- 2018: 680 daily ▲2.7% (MARC)

Services
Preceding station	MARC	Following station
Muirkirk toward Union Station	Camden Line	Savage toward Camden Station
Muirkirk toward Union Station	Camden Line	Laurel Racetrack Limited service One-way operation
College Park toward Brunswick	Camden Line limited service	Camden Station Terminus
Former services
Preceding station	Baltimore and Ohio Railroad	Following station
Muirkirk toward Chicago	Main Line	Laurel Park toward Jersey City
Oak Crest toward Chicago	Main Line	Laurel Park toward Jersey City
- Laurel Railroad Station
- U.S. National Register of Historic Places
- Location: East Main Street; Laurel, Maryland
- Built: 1884
- Architect: Ephraim Francis Baldwin
- Architectural style: Queen Anne
- NRHP reference No.: 73002165
- Added to NRHP: March 30, 1973
Location

Laurel station is a MARC Train station in Laurel, Maryland, served by the Camden Line.

== Station ==
The Laurel railroad station was originally constructed in 1884 for the Baltimore and Ohio Railroad along the railroad's Washington Branch, about halfway between Baltimore and Washington, DC. The architect was E. Francis Baldwin. The structure is constructed of brick, and is one and a half stories, modified rectangle in form with overhanging gabled and hipped roof sections with brackets and terra cotta cresting, and an interior chimney. There is a louvered lunette in one gable, stick work in another, and fish-scale shingling under truncated hipped section; shed shelter, segmental arched openings. It is Queen Anne in style. It is nearly identical in plan and dimensions to the Gaithersburg, Maryland station Baldwin designed, also built in 1884, although the rooflines and settings are quite different.

Laurel station was listed on the National Register of Historic Places in 1973, (although one source claims it was 1972) and was reopened as a MARC station when the Camden Line was established.

A fire gutted the interior of the station and damaged its roof and brick walls in January 1992.

In February 2009, Vice President Joe Biden, Governor Martin O'Malley, and Senator Ben Cardin gave a speech at Laurel station to gain support for an economic stimulus package in Congress that would provide funding to rebuild the station platform, among many other Maryland infrastructure projects. The funding bill passed and by mid-March, construction fencing went up for an anticipated six months of work on a new platform and other station improvement.

== Station layout ==
The station has two side platforms and a station house adjacent to the southbound platform. The station is compliant with the Americans with Disabilities Act of 1990.

== Gallery ==
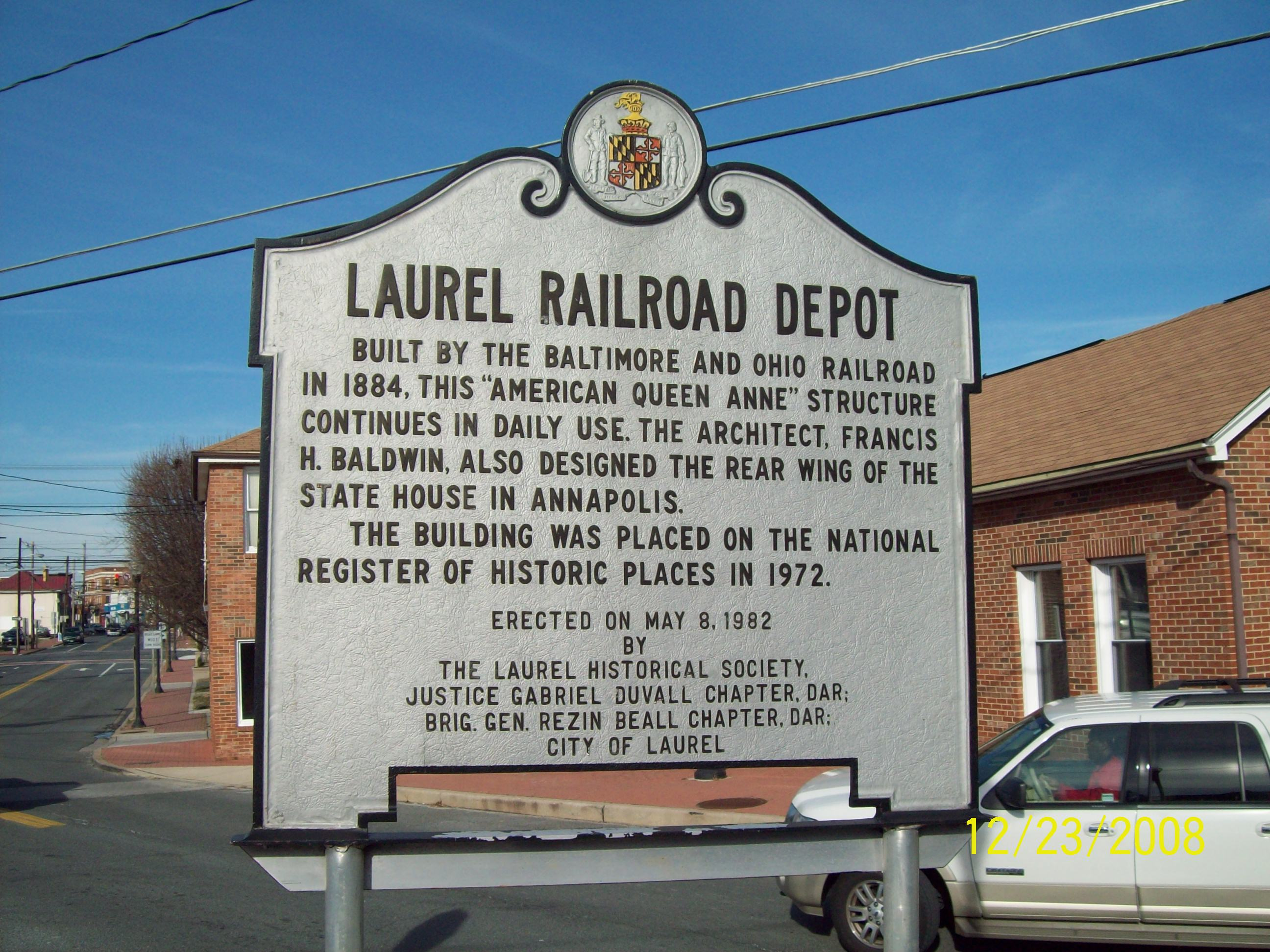
Laurel Railroad Station Historic Marker in December 2008

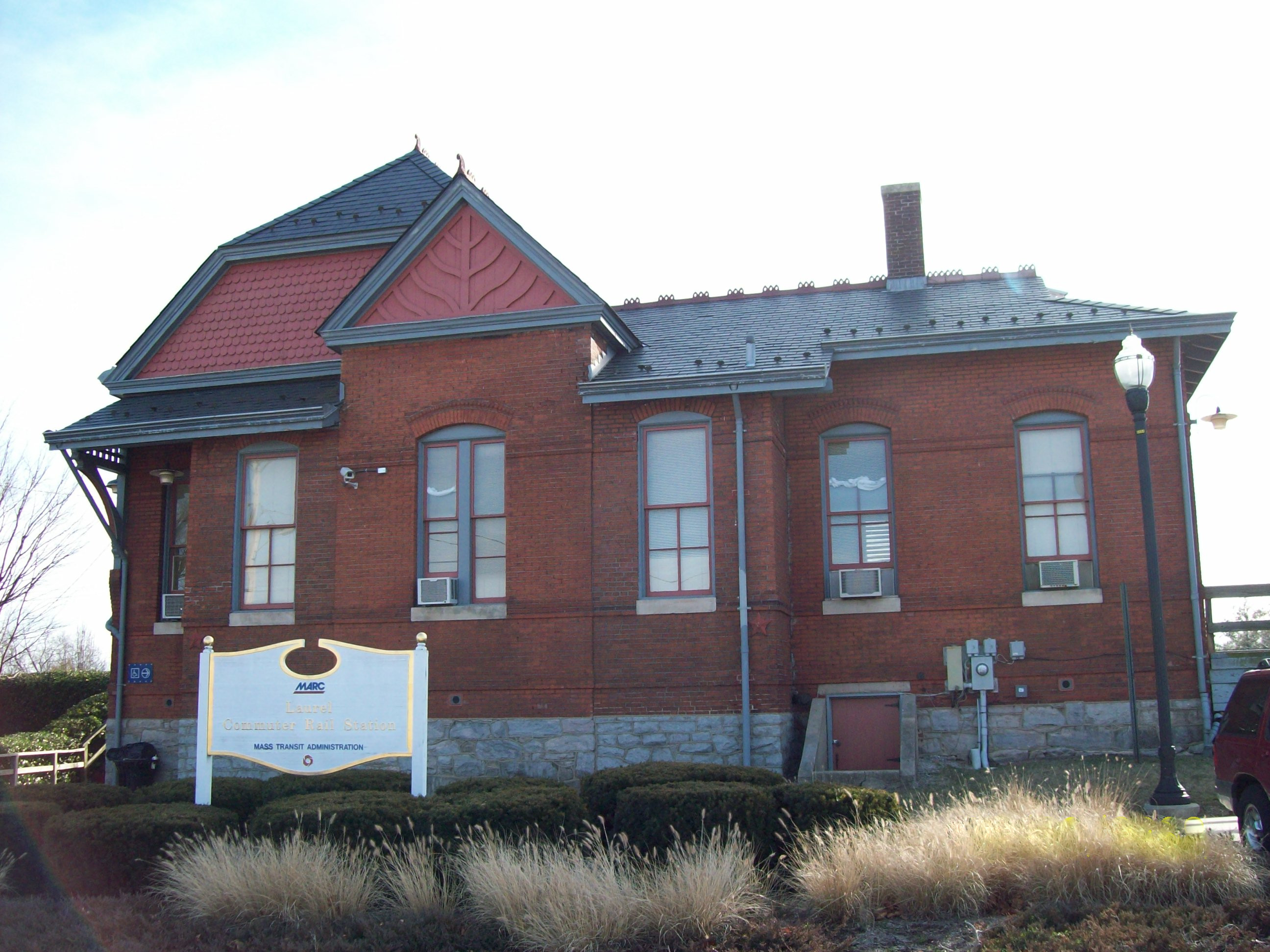
Downtown-side view of Laurel station in December 2008

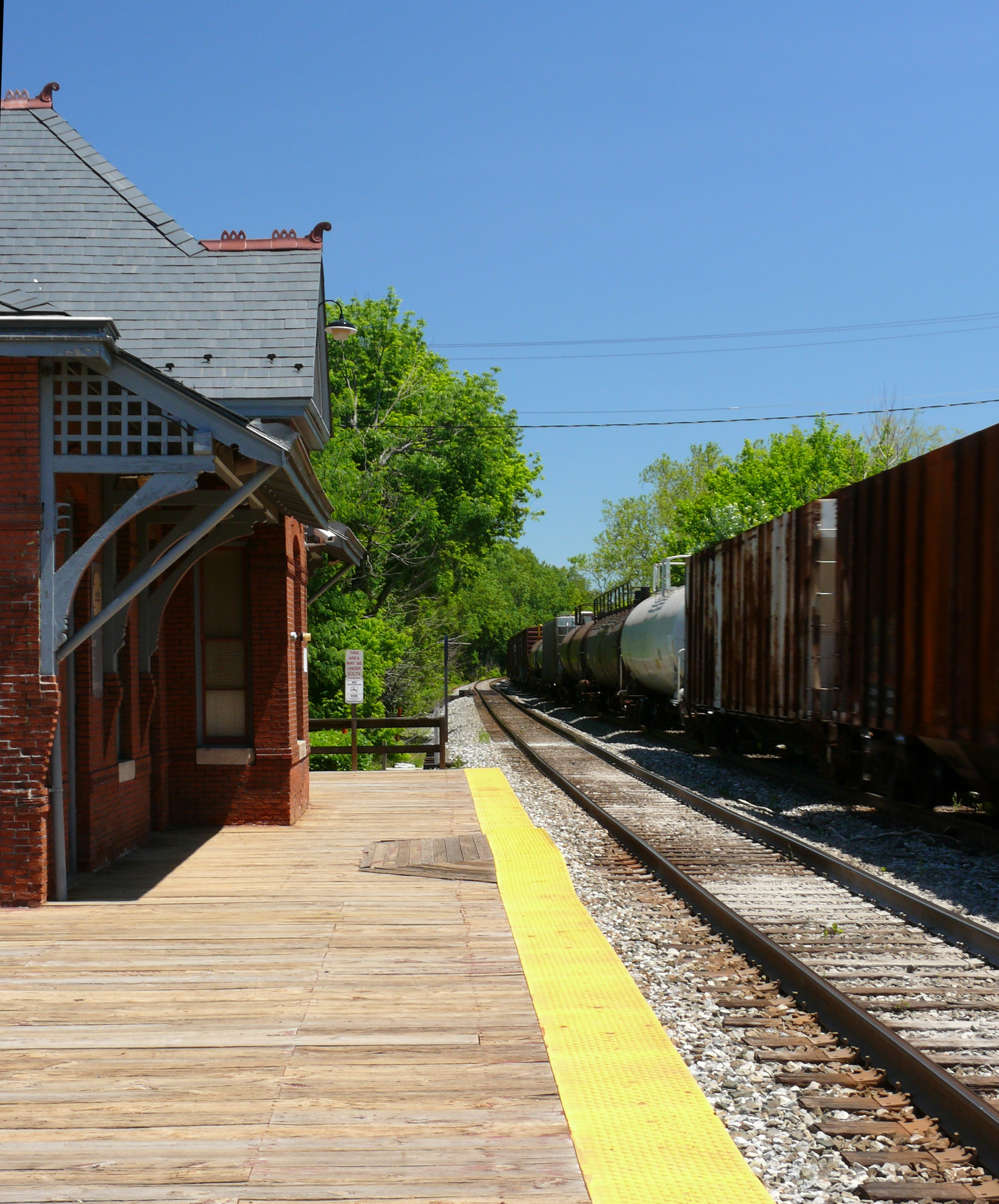
A freight train passes through Laurel station.
