= Jessup station =

Rail station in Howard County, Maryland, US

Jessup
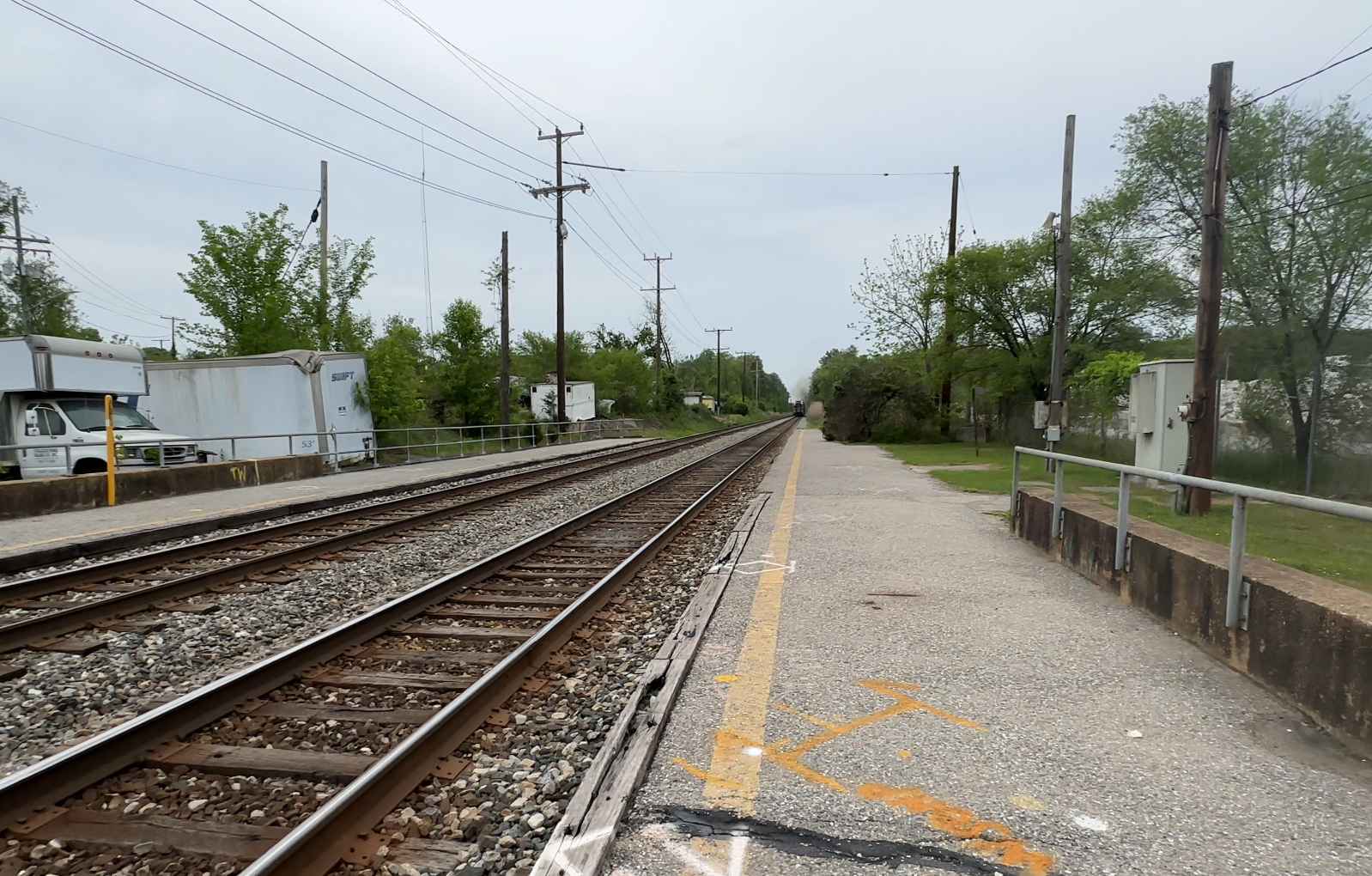
- Northbound at Jessup station in April 2024

General information
- Location: 8 Old Jessup Road; Jessup, Maryland
- Coordinates: 39.1515°N 76.7763°W
- Line: Capital Subdivision
- Platforms: 2 side platforms
- Tracks: 2

Construction
- Parking: 75 spaces
- Accessible: No

Passengers
- 2018: 1 daily

Services
Preceding station	MARC	Following station
Savage toward Union Station	Camden Line	Dorsey toward Camden Station
Former services
Preceding station	Baltimore and Ohio Railroad	Following station
Savage toward Chicago	Main Line	Dorsey toward Jersey City
Bridewell toward Chicago	Main Line	Montevideo toward Jersey City
Location

Jessup station is a passenger rail station on the MARC Camden Line located in Jessup, Maryland. It is located off Old Jessup Road, east of the Jessup Road bridge over the Camden Line. The station has two side platforms which are not accessible.

The station is located in primarily industrial and low density residential areas, there are no sidewalks on the roads leading from the station making pedestrian access difficult. As of 2024 the station is served by just a single round-trip per day–one southbound train in the morning and one northbound train in the evening.
