= Comden =

Comden is a surname. Notable people with the surname include:

- Betty Comden (1917–2006), one-half of the musical-comedy duo Comden and Green
- Danny Comden (born 1969), American actor, film director, producer, and writer

== See also ==
- Camden (surname)
