= Sports Legends Museum at Camden Yards =

Exhibition place in Baltimore

Coordinates: 39.2839°N 76.6192°W

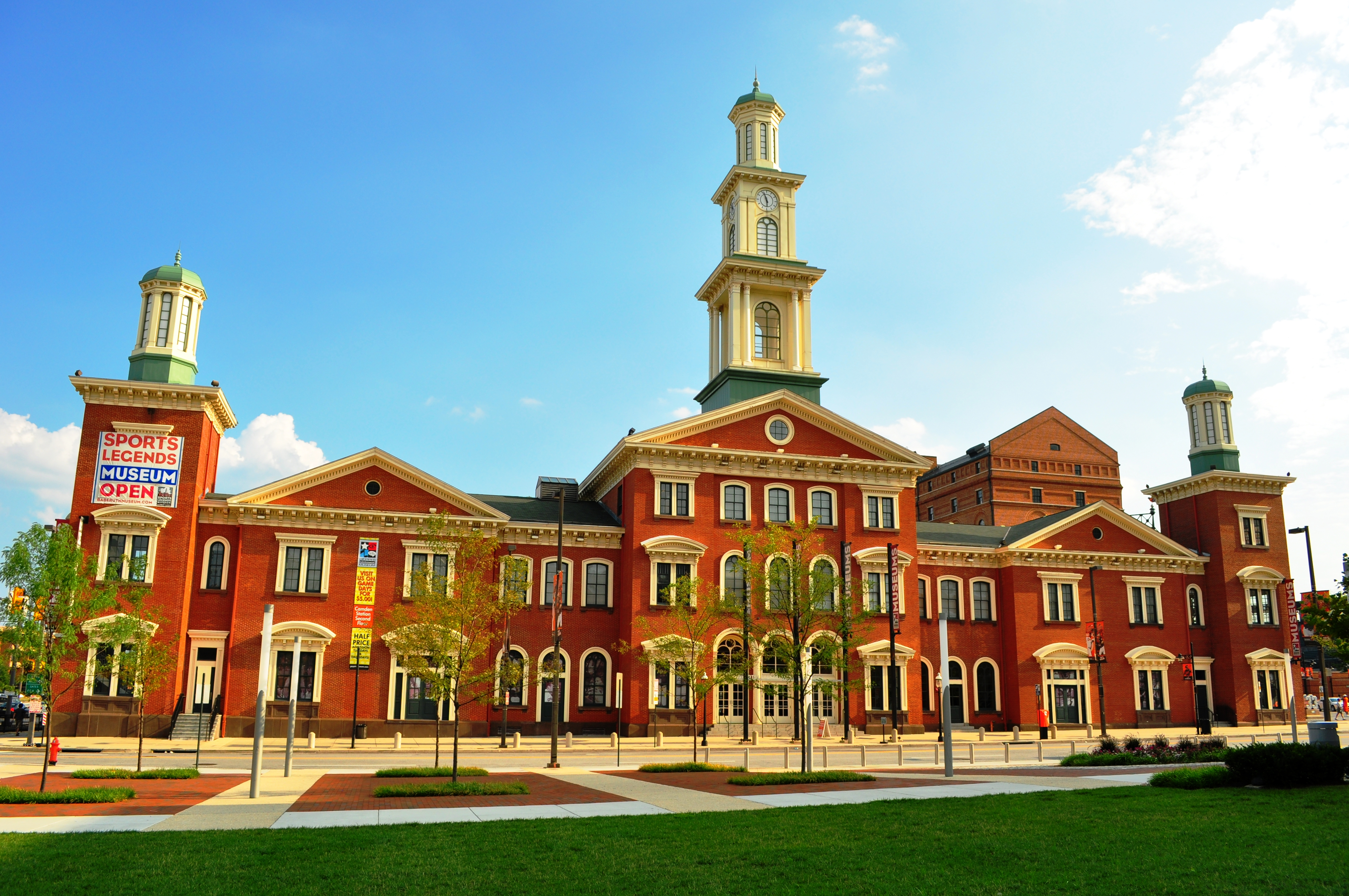
Sports Legends Museum at the former Baltimore and Ohio Railroad's Camden Station

Sports Legends Museum at Camden Yards was a non-profit sports museum in Baltimore, Maryland. The museum is owned and operated by the Babe Ruth Birthplace and Museum. It opened on May 14, 2005, with Julia Ruth Stevens, the daughter of celebrated baseball player Babe Ruth, in attendance. The 22,000-square-foot (2,044 m^{2}) museum, housed in the former Camden Station, was adjacent to the main gate of Oriole Park at Camden Yards and had artifacts and interactive exhibits profiling Maryland's sports history. Exhibits included such area teams as the Baltimore Orioles, Baltimore Ravens, Baltimore Colts, Maryland Terrapins, Baltimore Elite Giants, Baltimore Black Sox, and the Baltimore Blast.

A replica of the Vince Lombardi Trophy from Super Bowl V was part of the museum's collection. The original trophy from the Colts' 1971 Super Bowl victory was taken by former owner Carroll Rosenbloom after he traded the Colts for the Los Angeles Rams in 1972. A replica trophy was later made for the Colts, but in the Midnight Move of 1984, the team was not allowed to keep the trophy. That trophy stayed in the city of Baltimore's possession, and was placed in the Sports Legends Museum.

After ten years of operation the museum closed abruptly on October 12, 2015, after failing to reach an agreement with the Maryland Stadium Authority for the continued use of Camden Station. Geppi's Entertainment Museum, which opened in September 2006, was located on the upper level of the building, directly above where Sports Legends at Camden Yards was, until 2018. The nearby Babe Ruth Birthplace & Museum remains in existence as a separate museum on Emory Street, two and a half blocks from Camden Station.

== See also ==
- Baltimore Orioles Hall of Fame
