= Muirkirk station (MARC) =

Passenger rail station in Maryland, US

Muirkirk
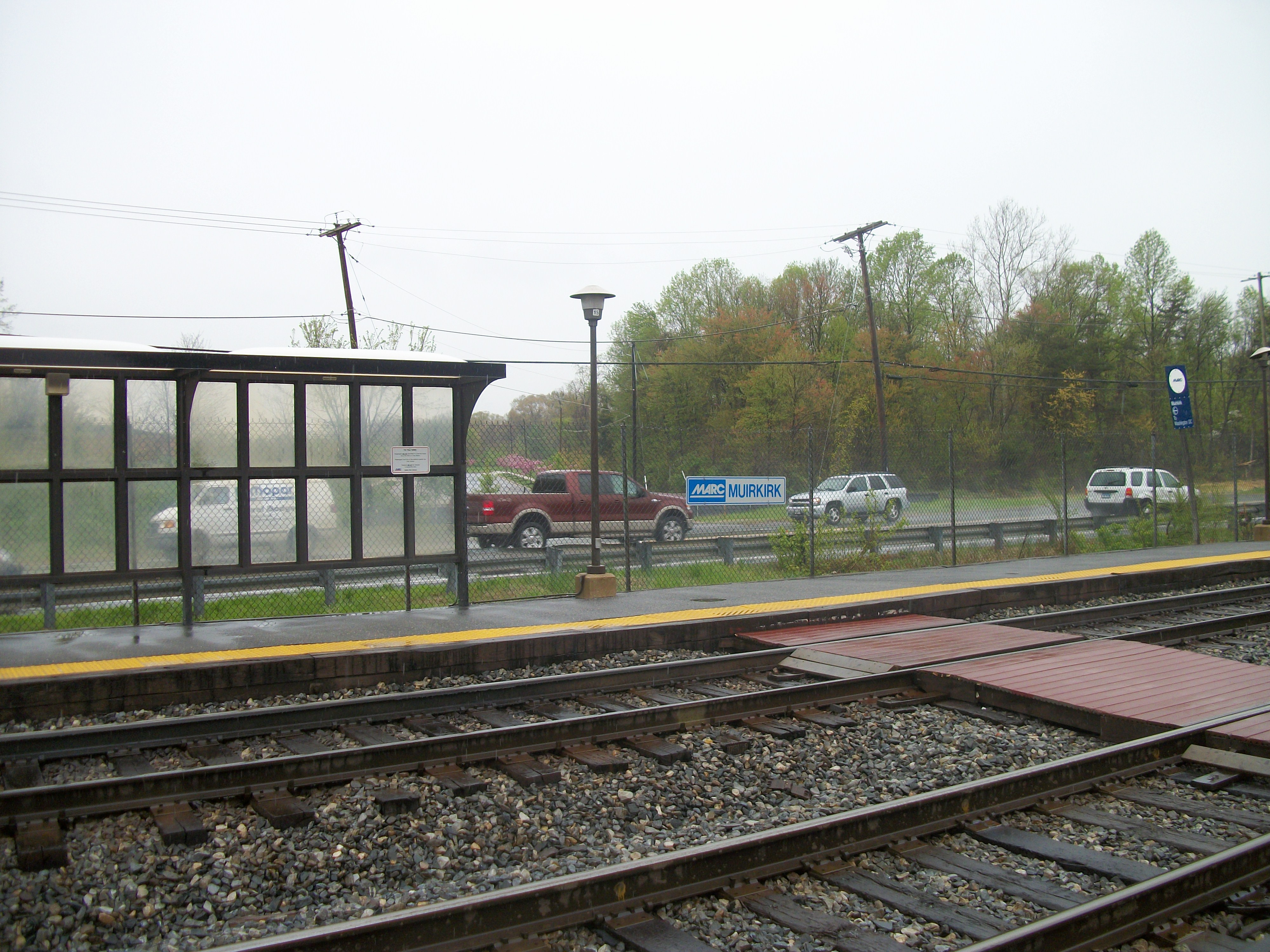
- The southbound platform of Muirkirk station in April 2011

General information
- Location: 7012-B Muirkirk Road; Beltsville, Maryland
- Coordinates: 39.0629°N 76.8841°W
- Line: Capital Subdivision
- Platforms: 2 side platforms
- Tracks: 2
- Connections: RTA: 302

Construction
- Parking: 650 spaces
- Cycle facilities: Yes
- Accessible: yes

Other information
- Station code: MUK

History
- Opened: December 12, 1994

Passengers
- 2018: 279 daily ▲3.3% (MARC)

Services
Preceding station	MARC	Following station
Greenbelt toward Union Station	Camden Line	Laurel toward Camden Station
Former services
Preceding station	Baltimore and Ohio Railroad	Following station
Riverdale toward Chicago	Main Line	Laurel toward Jersey City
Ammendale toward Chicago	Main Line	Contee toward Jersey City
Location

Muirkirk station is a MARC Train station in Beltsville, Maryland, served by the Camden Line. It has two accessible side platforms flanking the three-track CSX Capital Subdivision.
