= Camden Line =

MARC commuter rail line between Washington, D.C. and Baltimore, Maryland

- Camden Line train near St. Denis station in 2010

Overview
- Owner: CSX Transportation (tracks)
- Locale: Washington metropolitan area
- Termini: Washington Union Station (Washington, D.C); Camden Station (Baltimore)
- Stations: 12

Service
- Type: Commuter rail
- System: MARC Train
- Train number: 840–860
- Operator: Alstom/Maryland Transit Administration
- Daily ridership: 4,684 (June 2017)

History
- Opened: 1830

Technical
- Line length: 39 mi (63 km)
- Track gauge: 4 ft 8 1/2 in (1,435 mm)
- Operating speed: 32.5 mph (52.3 km/h) (avg.); 70 mph (110 km/h) (top)
Route map
Camden Line highlighted in orange

The Camden Line is a MARC commuter rail line that runs for 39 mi (63 km) between Washington Union Station in Washington, D.C., and Camden Station in Baltimore, Maryland, over the CSX Capital Subdivision and Baltimore Terminal Subdivision. The Baltimore and Ohio Railroad began running commuter service from Baltimore to Ellicott City over part of the current line's trackage on May 24, 1830, making this corridor one of the country's oldest rail routes still in operation. The line was extended to Washington on August 25, 1835. As of 2019, the line is a weekday-only service. On September 28, 2026, one weekday round trip began operating between Brunswick and Camden Station via the Brunswick and Camden lines.

== Stations list ==
State	Town/city	Station	Connections
DC	Washington	Union Station	Amtrak: Acela, Cardinal, Carolinian, Crescent, Floridian, Northeast Regional, Palmetto, Silver Meteor, Vermonter, Thruway Bus to Charlottesville, Virginia; MARC: ■ Penn Line, ■ Brunswick Line; VRE: ■ Manassas Line, ■ Fredericksburg Line; Metrorail: Red Line; Metrobus, MTA Maryland, LC Transit, OmniRide; Intercity bus service: Greyhound, Peter Pan, Megabus, Washington Deluxe, BestBus
MD	Riverdale Park	Riverdale	Metrobus
MD	College Park	College Park	Metrorail: Green Line, Yellow Line; Metrobus, Shuttle–UM, GoPGC, MTA Commuter Bus
MD	Greenbelt	Greenbelt	Metrorail: Green Line, Yellow Line; Metrobus, Shuttle–UM, GoPGC, RTA
MD	Beltsville	Muirkirk	Metrobus, RTA
MD	Laurel	Laurel	Metrobus, RTA
MD	Laurel	Laurel Racetrack	RTA
MD	Savage	Savage	RTA
MD	Jessup	Jessup	
MD	Dorsey	Dorsey	MTA Commuter BusLink, RTA
MD	St. Denis	St. Denis	
MD	Baltimore	Camden Station	Baltimore Light RailLink
