= Laurel Racetrack station =

Train station in near Laurel, Maryland, US

Laurel Racetrack
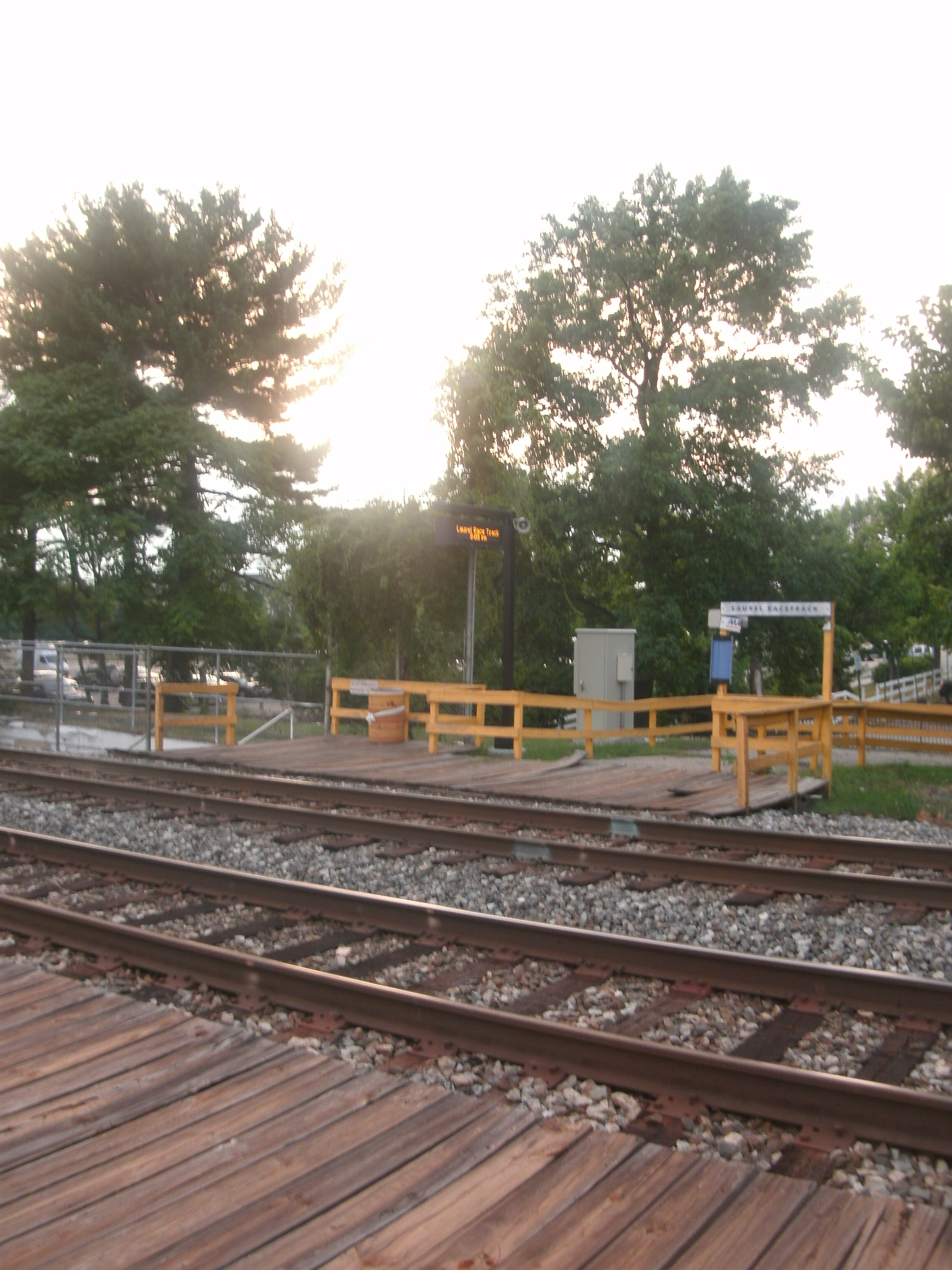
- The station in July 2012

General information
- Other names: Laurel Park
- Location: Laurel Race Track Road; North Laurel, Maryland
- Coordinates: 39°6′20.41″N 76°50′2.09″W
- Line: Capital Subdivision
- Platforms: 2 side platforms
- Tracks: 2

Construction
- Parking: 300 spaces
- Accessible: No

History
- Opened: October 2, 1911
- Rebuilt: January 31, 1994

Passengers
- 2018: 2 daily ▼60% (MARC)

Services
Preceding station	MARC	Following station
Laurel toward Union Station	Camden Line Limited service	Savage One-way operation
Former services
Preceding station	Baltimore and Ohio Railroad	Following station
Laurel toward Chicago	Main Line	Savage toward Jersey City
Location

Laurel Racetrack station (also called Laurel Park) is a MARC Train station located in unincorporated North Laurel in Howard County, Maryland, primarily serving the nearby Laurel Park race track. The station has limited service on the Camden Line. It has two wooden side platforms that are not accessible.

== History ==
The station was announced to open by the Baltimore and Ohio Railroad on October 2, 1911, opening alongside the racetrack.

MARC started service to the station effective January 31, 1994, with 250 parking spaces. A station building was proposed in 2006, however it was never constructed.

A transit-oriented development adjacent to the station was proposed in 2015. A development known as Paddock Pointe has built 220 residential units near the station since 2020, with plans to add 880 units and 777,000 square feet (72,200 m^{2}) of commercial space. The station is planned to renovated alongside it.
