= St. Denis station (MARC) =

Rail station in Baltimore County, Maryland, US

St. Denis
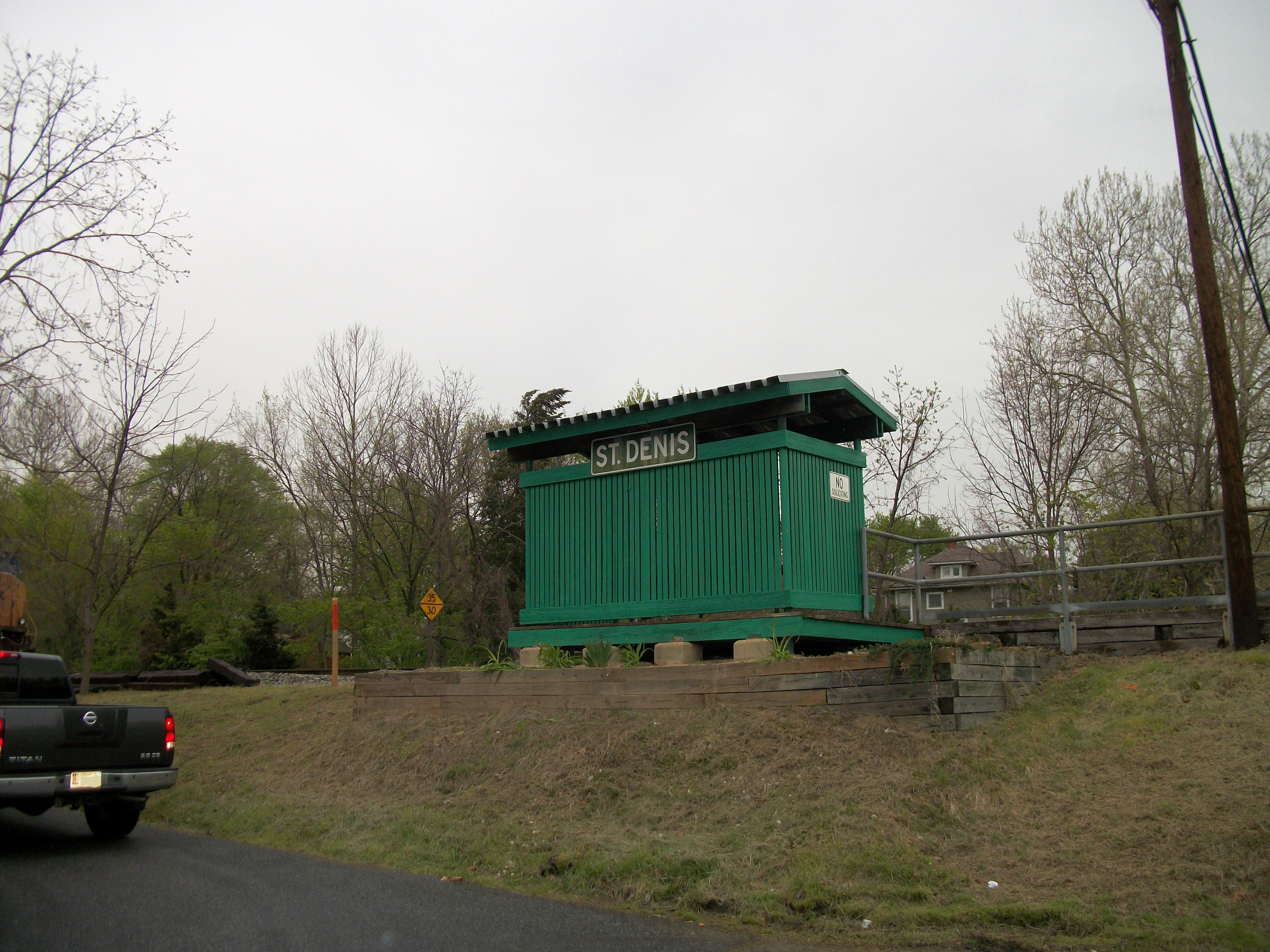
- The shelter on the northbound platform of St. Denis station.

General information
- Location: 1734 Arlington Avenue; Halethorpe, Maryland
- Coordinates: 39°13′27″N 76°42′14″W
- Owner: Maryland Transit Administration
- Line: CSX Capital Subdivision
- Platforms: 2 side platforms
- Tracks: 3

Construction
- Parking: 15 spaces
- Accessible: No

Passengers
- 2018: 11 daily ▲37.5%

Services
Preceding station	MARC	Following station
Dorsey toward Union Station	Camden Line	Camden Station Terminus
Former services
Preceding station	Baltimore and Ohio Railroad	Following station
Dorsey toward Chicago	Main Line	Baltimore Camden Terminus
Dorsey toward Chicago	Main Line	Howard Street toward Jersey City
Relay toward Chicago	Main Line	Halethorpe toward Jersey City
Location

St. Denis station is a passenger rail station on the MARC Camden Line in the Maryland town of the same name. While the small station is the line's closest station to its terminus at Camden Yards in Baltimore, it has low ridership.

St. Denis station contains two platforms and three tracks. The southbound platform, located on the corner of Arlington and Maple Avenues, has a shelter that is made of plexiglas and aluminum. MARC gives this platform as the official address of the station. The northbound platform contains a wooden shelter on an embankment at the end of East Street with the name of the station on the back of it. The station also contains two at-grade wooden pedestrian crossings, one which spans the entire right-of-way from Arlington Avenue to East Street, and the other which only runs from the southbound platform on Maple Avenue to the middle tracks.

East of St. Denis, the Camden Line crosses over the MARC Penn Line south of the Halethorpe MARC station. The station itself was an excellent spot for railfanning due to its proximity to Baltimore and its location at a point that sees Capital Subdivision, Baltimore Terminal Subdivision, and Old Main Line Subdivision freight traffic. However, "No Trespassing" signs were installed in the spring of 2024 to prohibit public access during non-operating hours of MARC train service. A junction leading to the B&O Railroad Museum also exists between here and the terminus at Camden Yards.

== Accessibility ==
The station is not compliant with the Americans with Disabilities Act of 1990, lacking raised platforms for level boarding.

== Communities served ==
- St. Denis, Maryland, community surrounding the station
- Relay, Maryland, located just north of the station
- Elkridge, Maryland, 1.2 miles away (24 minute walk)

== Nearby attractions ==
- Patapsco Valley State Park, Avalon Area
- Elkridge Furnace Complex
- Thomas Viaduct
- Guinness Brewery
