= Camden Township =

Camden Township may refer to the following places:

- Camden Township, Schuyler County, Illinois, United States
- Camden Township, Michigan, United States
- Camden Township, Minnesota, United States
- Camden Township, Ray County, Missouri, United States
- Camden Township, Ohio, United States
- Camden Township, Ontario (disambiguation), Canada
