= Camden, Nova Scotia =

Community in Nova Scotia, Canada

Coordinates: 45°18′59″N 63°11′46″W

Camden in Nova Scotia

Camden is an unincorporated community in the Canadian province of Nova Scotia, located in Colchester County.
