= Geppi's Entertainment Museum =

Former museum in Baltimore, Maryland, US

Coordinates: 39°17′6″N 76°37′11″W

- pop art with character

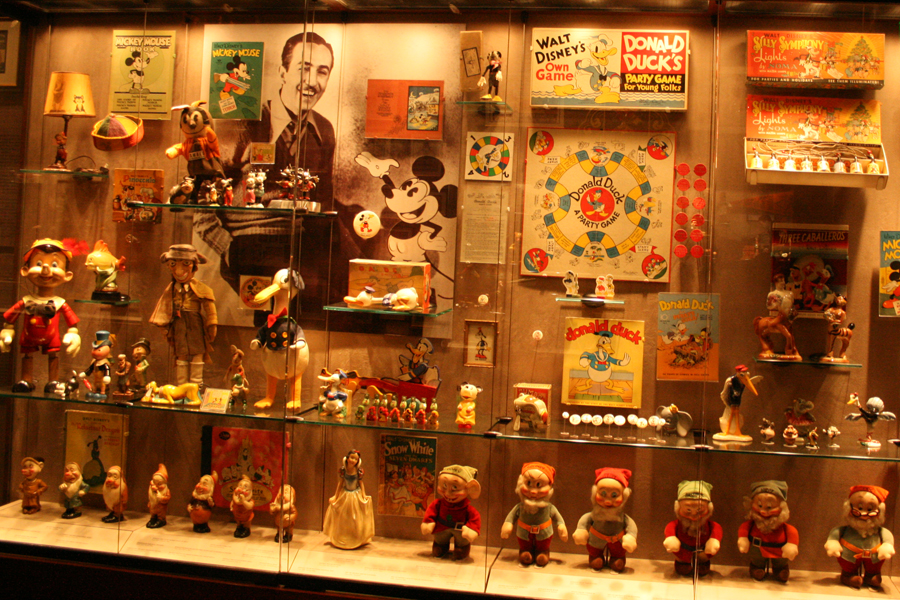
- Disney collectibles from 1928 to 1945
- Established: September 8, 2006
- Dissolved: June 3, 2018
- Location: 2nd floor, Camden Station Baltimore, Maryland
- Directors: Melissa Geppi-Bowersox, President
- Website: Official website (archived on May 11, 2018)

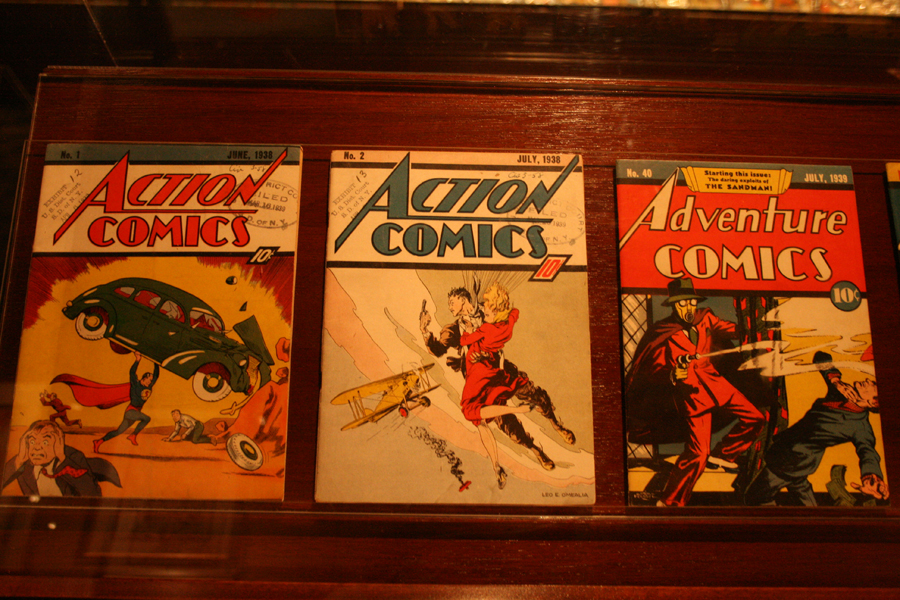
First edition comic books

Geppi's Entertainment Museum was a 16,000-square-foot (1,500 m^{2}) privately owned pop culture museum located at historic Camden Station at Camden Yards in Baltimore, Maryland. The museum chronicled the history of pop culture in America from the 17th century to the early 21st century, as made popular in newspapers, magazines, comic books, movies, television, radio and video games. It featured a collection of nearly 60,000 pop culture artifacts, including magazines, movie posters, toys, buttons, badges, cereal boxes, trading cards, dolls, figurines, and other memorabilia.

In May 2018, Geppi's Museum announced that it would close on June 3, 2018. Much of the collection was donated to the Library of Congress.

== Background ==
The museum was owned by Stephen A. Geppi, President and CEO of Diamond Comics Distributors; the majority of the artifacts came from Geppi's private collection. In 2007, Geppi's daughter Melissa "Missy" Geppi-Bowersox became the Executive Vice-president of the museum; in 2012, Geppi-Bowersox was promoted to president.

The museum's founding curator was Dr. Arnold T. Blumberg, former editor at Gemstone Publishing. In 2011, Andy Hershberger was promoted to Associate Curator/Registrar, and has since worked with Melissa Geppi-Bowersox in the creation of a curatorial advisory committee.

In 2012, the museum store, Flashbacks, was renamed Geppi's Comic World in honor of Geppi's former comic chain.

== Exhibits ==
The museum was composed of several galleries devoted to different eras of pop culture, as well as a temporary exhibit space for rotating exhibits. The standing galleries were:

- A Story in Four Colors displayed a large collection of comic books to the Golden Age to the Modern Era. The gallery also included an extensive collection of pulp magazines and Big Little Books.
- Pioneer Spirit: Baltimore Heroes looked at personalities, businesses and events that contributed to Baltimore's reputation.
- Extra, Extra: 1776–1927 featured characters made popular in newspapers, books, movies and radio broadcasts of the era.
- When Heroes Unite: 1928–1945 displayed character collectibles from the Great Depression until World War II, including Mickey Mouse, Popeye, Superman, Captain Marvel, Dick Tracy, Tom Mix, Gene Autry, The Lone Ranger and more.
- America Tunes In: 1946–1960 featured artifacts from the postwar era, including Howdy Doody, I Love Lucy, Davy Crockett, sports heroes, space and western shows and rock and roll.
- Revolution: 1961 to 1970 contained relics from one of the most influential decades of the 20th century. James Bond, The Flintstones, Batman, The Green Hornet, Star Trek, The Beatles, Barbie and G.I. Joe are among the characters and franchises represented here.
- Expanding Universe: 1971–1990 highlighted video games, fast food tie-ins, Saturday morning cartoons, TV celebrities and Star Wars, among other post-1960s developments in pop culture.
- Going Global: 1991–Present displayed artifacts from the last decade of the 20th century to the 2010s, and included representation of MC Hammer, Jack Sparrow, Hannah Montana and the Toy Story franchise.

The galleries branched off from a central hallway whose walls were covered with comic strips, animation and comic art sketches, and movie posters. There were two statues of Superman located at each end of the hall.

=== Special Edition: Temporary Exhibits ===
Geppi's Entertainment Museum was host to a wide range of rotating exhibits on topics such as Star Wars, the Overstreet Comic Book Price Guide, and previews of upcoming toys. In February 2013, the temporary exhibit was Milestones: African Americans in Comics, Pop Culture and Beyond. Developed and curated by Michael Davis, co-founder of Milestone Media, it ran through March 2014.

== Awards and recognition ==
- Winner of Nickelodeon's 2009 ParentsConnect.com Parents' Picks Award for Best Kid Museum.
- Winner of Nickelodeon's 2008 ParentsConnect.com Parents' Picks Award for Best Teen Museum.
- Baltimore City Paper's GEM Best NonArt Museum, 2007.

== In popular culture ==
The museum is featured in the 2008 Free Comic Book Day edition of Archie Comics Archie's Pal Jughead. The story, "Night at the Entertainment Museum," involves Archie and Jughead getting a job as night watchmen at the museum. Owner Steve Geppi and founding curator Arnold T. Blumberg also appear in the story.
