= Savage station =

Rail station in Savage, Maryland, US

Savage
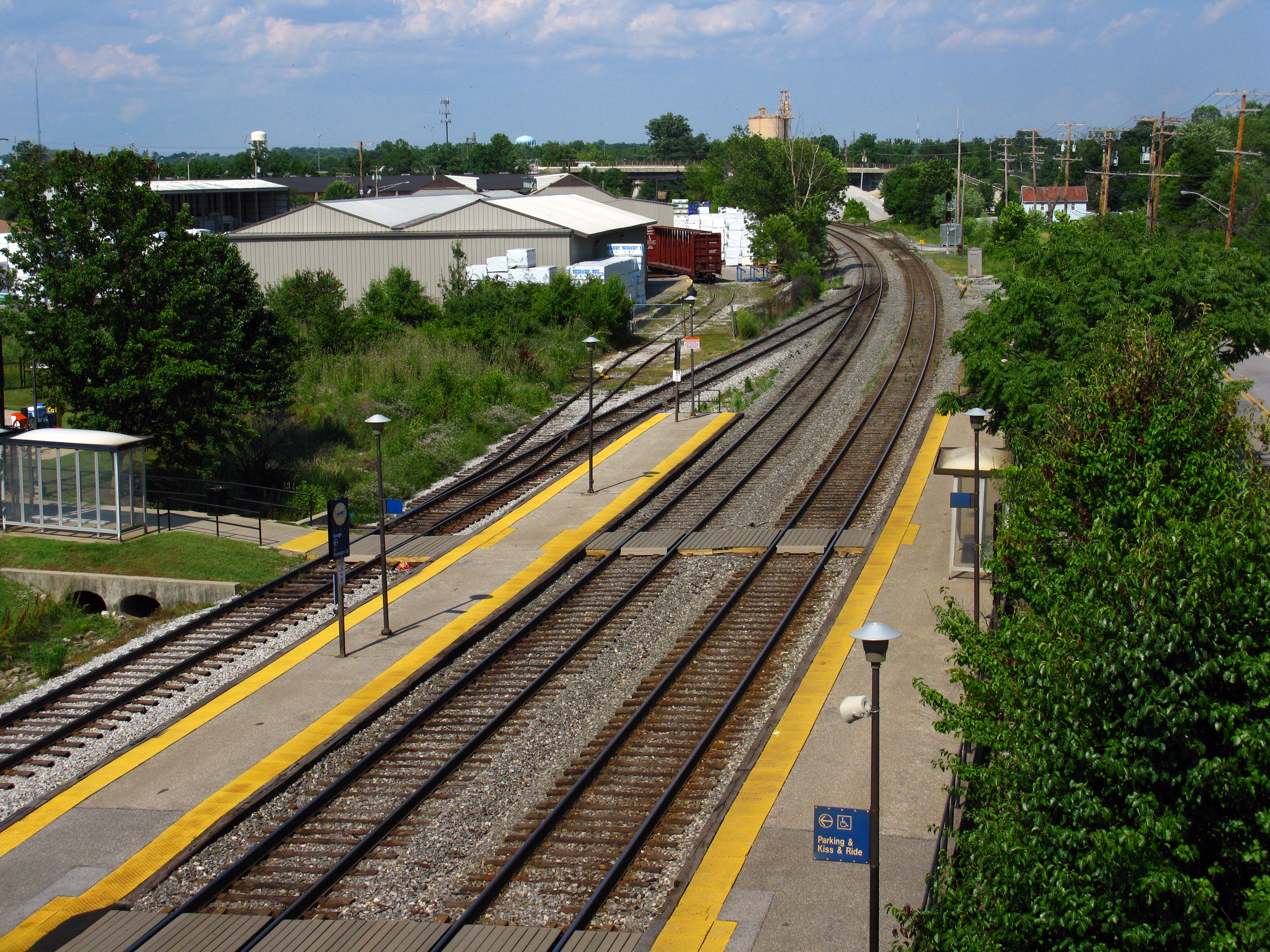
- Savage station in June 2008

General information
- Location: 9009 Dorsey Run Road; Savage, Maryland
- Coordinates: 39.1229°N 76.7963°W
- Line: CSX Capital Subdivision
- Platforms: 1 side platform, 1 island platform
- Tracks: 3
- Connections: RTA: 409, 502

Construction
- Parking: 914 spaces
- Accessible: Yes

History
- Opened: July 31, 1989

Passengers
- 2018: 454 daily

Services
Preceding station	MARC	Following station
Laurel Racetrack toward Union Station	Camden Line	Jessup toward Camden Station
Former services
Preceding station	Baltimore and Ohio Railroad	Following station
Laurel Park toward Chicago	Main Line	Jessup toward Jersey City
Laurel Park toward Chicago	Main Line	Camp Meade Junction toward Jersey City
Location

Savage station is a MARC Camden Line station located on the border of Howard County and Anne Arundel County, Maryland. It is located off Dorsey Run Road near Maryland Route 32 between Annapolis Junction and Savage, Maryland. The station has one side platform and one island platform serving the three tracks of the CSX Capital Subdivision. A 914-space parking garage is located on the north side of the tracks.

Savage station opened on July 31, 1989, as an infill station.
