= Camden College =

Camden College is the name of:

- Camden College (Congregational Church school), Glebe, New South Wales, Australia
- Camden College (fictional college), a fictional liberal arts college based on Bennington College
- Camden County College, a public community college located in Camden County, New Jersey
