= Camden Township, Ontario =

Camden Township may refer to:

- Camden Township, Kent County, Ontario, a former geographic township within Kent County, Ontario; now part of Chatham-Kent, Ontario
- Camden Township, Addington County, Ontario, a former geographic township within Addington County, Ontario; now part of Stone Mills Township, Lennox and Addington County, Ontario
