= Camden Football Club (disambiguation) =

Camden Football Club may refer to:

- Camden Cats Senior Australian Football Club, an Australian rules football club in Sydney, Australia
- Camden Football Club (South Australia), a former Australian rules football club in Adelaide, Australia

== See also ==
- PHOS Camden Football Club, an Australian rules football club in Adelaide, Australia
