= Dorsey, Maryland =

Unincorporated community in Maryland, United States

- Unincorporated community
- Location within Maryland
- Coordinates: 39°10′38″N 76°44′35″W
- Country: United States
- State: Maryland
- County: Howard
- Founded: 1881
- Time zone: UTC-5 (Eastern (EST))
  - Summer (DST): UTC-4 (EDT)
- ZIP Code: 21075
- Area codes: 410 & 443

Dorsey, Maryland, is an unincorporated community along the border of eastern Howard County and northwestern Anne Arundel County in Maryland, United States. It is located south of Elkridge, north of Savage, and close to Baltimore-Washington International Airport (BWI). It is in the southern part of the Baltimore metropolitan area.

Dorsey is perhaps listed as a former postal stop that operated from December 1881 on the B&O railroad and is now a MARC commuter rail system stop, which carries commuters into downtown Baltimore and Washington, D.C. Dorsey is a stop on MARC's Camden line and contains a large parking lot off Maryland State Highway 100. Dorsey station mainly serves commuters from Elkridge and Ellicott City, as well as the northern parts of Columbia. Howard Transit buses connect Dorsey station with various locations around Howard County as well as with the nearby Arundel Mills mall.

Businesses in the area include hotels, warehouses, and satellite campuses for both Johns Hopkins University and the University of Maryland University College (both of which are located within the Dorsey Business Center).

The Dorsey Business Center is a 50-acre (200,000 m^{2}) business park developed between 1984 and 1989 by Douglas Legum Development Inc. It was the first large-scale development project in this part of the Baltimore region. The Dorsey Business Center sits on the site of the former Dorsey Speedway, a stock car track, and now contains over two million square feet of office and retail space. Howard Transit buses connect the business park to the Dorsey MARC station.
