= St. Denis, Maryland =

Unincorporated community in Maryland, United States

Saint Denis, Maryland
- unincorporated community
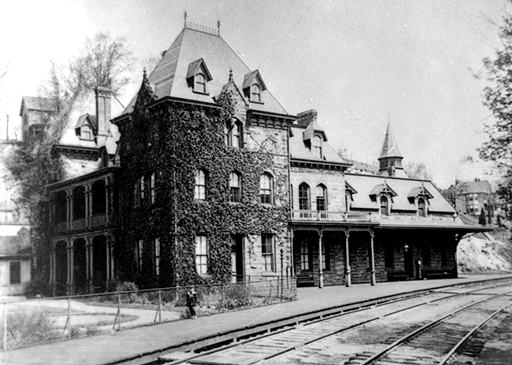
- The Relay Hotel, once located at the Thomas Viaduct on Railroad Avenue

- Location within Maryland
- Coordinates: 39°13′22″N 76°42′17″W
- Country: United States
- State: Maryland
- County: Baltimore
- Founder: Dennis Smith
- Time zone: Eastern
- Postal code: 21227

St. Denis is an unincorporated community in Baltimore County in Central Maryland, United States, located in Arbutus, south of Baltimore.

It is located on the CSX main line between Halethorpe and Relay (the latter being the site of the Thomas Viaduct), and is best known as a stop on the MARC commuter rail (on the Camden line). In former years, a station building stood here similar to that in Germantown, but all that remains are the platforms. That station, built in 1891, was destroyed by an arson fire in 1976. The Maryland Transit Administration considered discontinuing this stop in 2006 but was prevented from doing so by legislation in the Maryland General Assembly.

The Halethorpe MARC station is on a different line than the St. Denis station, as St. Denis is on the former Baltimore and Ohio Railroad, and Halethorpe on the former Pennsylvania Railroad.
