= Camden (surname) =

Camden is a surname. Notable people with the surname include:

- Anthony Camden (1938–2006), British oboist, son of Archie Camden
- Archie Camden (1989–2014), British bassoonist
- Johnson N. Camden (1828–1908), American politician
- Johnson N. Camden Jr. (1865–1942), American politician
- Lewis Camden (born 1953), Canadian politician from Quebec
- Peter G. Camden (1801–1873), mayor of St. Louis, Missouri
- Robert Camden Cope (1771–1818), British politician
- William Camden (1551–1623), English antiquary and historian
