= Camden Station =

Rail station in Baltimore, Maryland, US

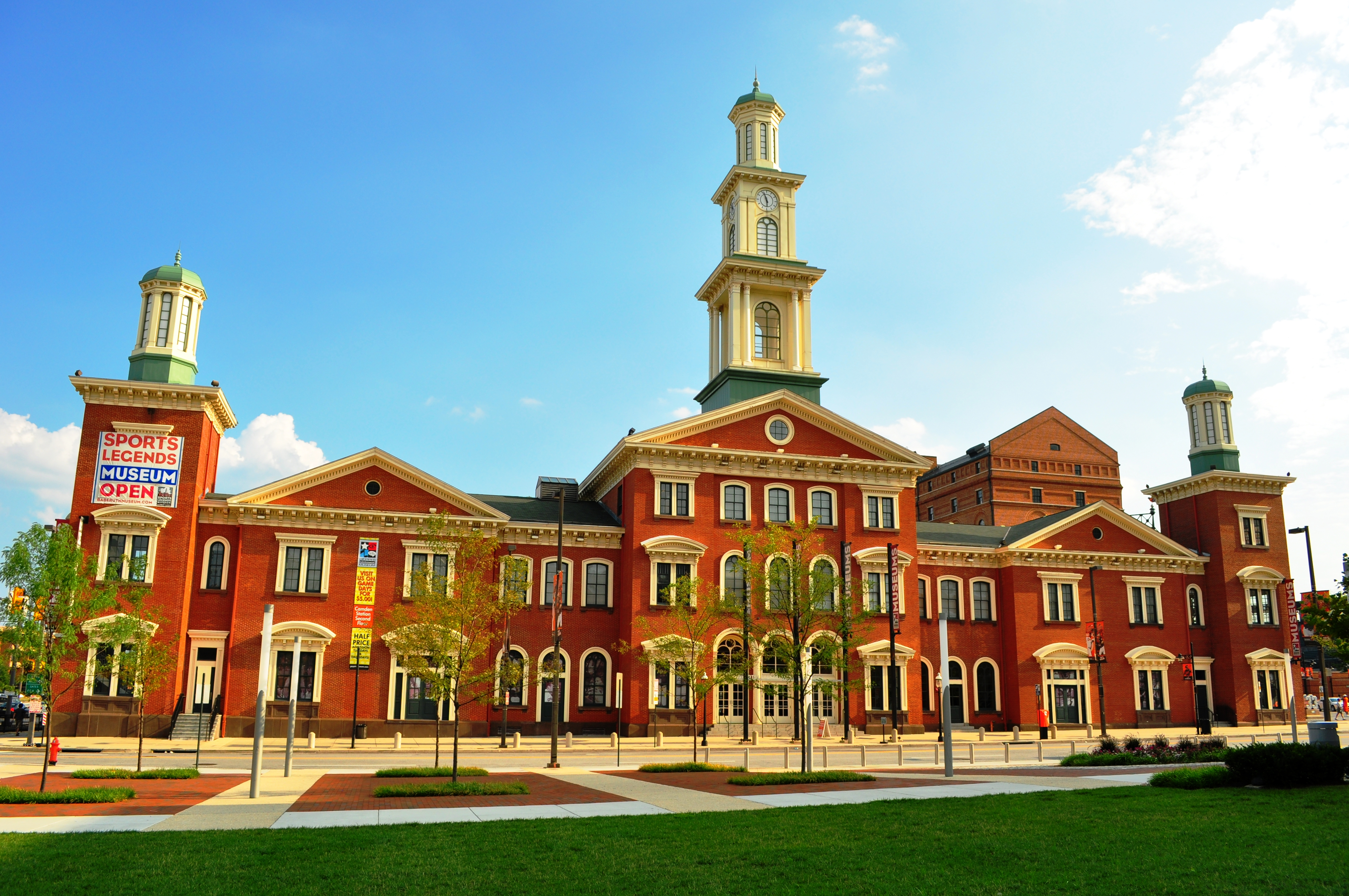
- The original B&O station restored as the Sports Legends Museum at Camden Yards in July 2010

General information
- Location: 301 West Camden Street; Baltimore, Maryland
- Coordinates: 39°17′00″N 76°37′10″W
- Owner: CSX Transportation
- Operator: Maryland Transit Administration
- Line: Baltimore Terminal Subdivision
- Platforms: 3 island platforms
- Tracks: 6 (3 MTA, 3 MARC)
- Connections: MTA BaltimoreLink: Brown, Navy, 54, 76, 94, 120, 160, 320, 410, 411, 420

Construction
- Parking: 1,004 spaces
- Cycle facilities: Covered racks
- Accessible: Yes

History
- Opened: 1867

Passengers
- 2018: 429 daily ▲27.6% (MARC)
- 2017: 616 (Light RailLink)

Services
Preceding station	MARC	Following station
St. Denis toward Union Station	Camden Line	Terminus
Laurel toward Brunswick	Camden Line limited service	Terminus
Preceding station	Maryland Transit Administration	Following station
Stadium/Federal Hill toward BWI Airport or Glen Burnie	Light RailLink	Convention Center toward Hunt Valley
Terminus	Light RailLink Penn–Camden Shuttle	Convention Center toward Penn Station
Former services
Preceding station	Baltimore and Ohio Railroad	Following station
St. Denis toward Chicago	Main Line	Baltimore Mount Royal toward Jersey City
Mt. Winans toward Chicago	Main Line	Baltimore Mount Royal toward Jersey City
Mt. Winans toward Point of Rocks	Old Main Line	Terminus
Preceding station	Baltimore and Annapolis Railroad	Following station
Carroll toward Annapolis	Baltimore – Annapolis	Terminus
Track layout
Location

Camden Station, now also referred to as Camden Street Station, Camden Yards, and formally as the Transportation Center at Camden Yards, is a train station at the intersection of South Howard and West Camden Streets in Baltimore, Maryland, adjacent to Oriole Park at Camden Yards, behind the B&O Warehouse. It is served by MARC commuter rail service and local Light Rail trains.

Camden Street Station was originally built beginning in 1856, continuing until 1865, by the Baltimore and Ohio Railroad as its main passenger terminal and early offices/ headquarters (until 1881) in Baltimore and is one of the longest continuously operated terminals in the United States. Its upstairs offices were the workplace of famous Civil War era B&O President John Work Garrett (1820–1884). The station and its environs were also the site of several infamous civil strife actions of the 19th century with the Baltimore riot of 1861, on April 18–19, also known as the Pratt Street Riots and later labor strife in the Great Railroad Strike of 1877.

== History ==
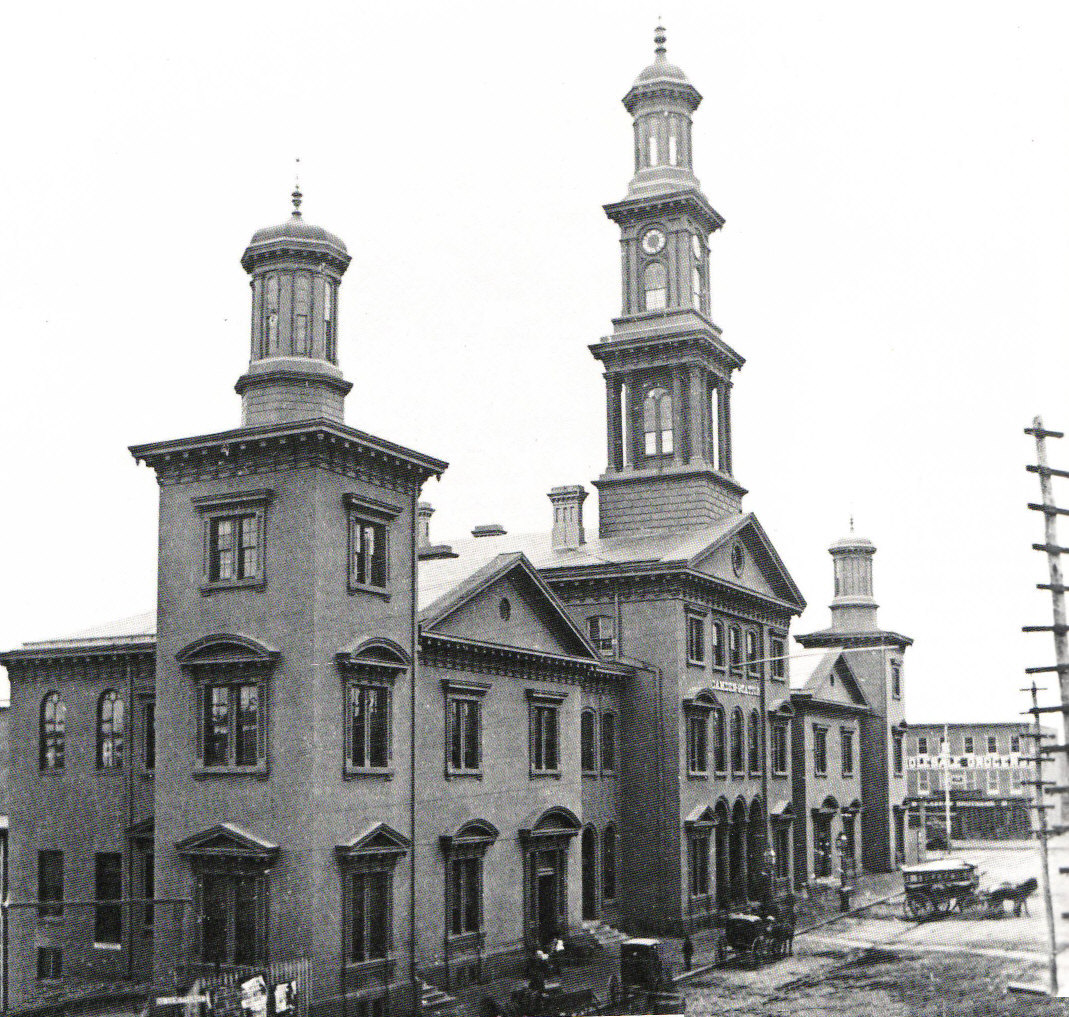
Camden Station in 1868

=== Development ===
In 1852, the board of directors of the Baltimore and Ohio Railroad (B&O) approved the purchase of five blocks of land fronting on Camden Street at a cost of $600,000 for the construction of a new passenger and freight station to serve the city of Baltimore from a larger, more centrally located site than the B&O's 1830s–1850s depot, Mount Clare Station. Architectural renderings for Camden Station were submitted by the firm of Niernsee and Neilson in 1855. Construction began in phases in 1856 under the supervision of Baltimore architect Joseph F. Kemp, who also partly designed the final version, a three-story brick structure with three towers in the Italianate architectural style. The center section was substantially completed by 1857; thereafter, the station was used by the B&O's passenger trains until the 1980s, one of the longest continuously operated railroad terminals in the U.S. Construction was completed in 1867 with the addition of two wings and the towers following the end of the Civil War. The station's center tower was originally 185 feet (56 m) high.

=== Civil War years ===
In February, 1861, Abraham Lincoln transferred from the President Street station, to the Camden Station on his way to Washington, D.C. to be inaugurated as President of the United States. News of the Battle of Fort Sumter, beginning the Civil War, first reached Baltimore on April 12, 1861, at the B&O's Camden Station telegraph office. The following week, Union troops of the 6th Massachusetts Militia travelling south on the B&O barricaded themselves at Camden Station when they were attacked by Confederate sympathizers in the Baltimore riot of 1861.

During the four-year conflict, the B&O's line between Baltimore and Washington, D.C. was the sole rail link between the Federal capitol and the North, resulting in a vital role for Camden Station as B&O's Baltimore terminal. Trainloads of wounded soldiers and Confederate POWs came through the station following the Battle of Antietam, 75 miles (121 km) west of Baltimore on September 17, 1862. President Lincoln changed trains at Camden Station on November 18, 1863 en route to Gettysburg, Pennsylvania to deliver the Gettysburg Address. Lincoln also used Camden Station on April 18, 1864 when he made an overnight visit to Baltimore for a speaking engagement. A year later, at 10 a.m. on April 21, 1865, the assassinated president's nine-car funeral train arrived at Camden Station, the first stop on its slow journey from Washington to Springfield, Illinois, via the B&O and the Northern Central Railway's Baltimore-Harrisburg, Pennsylvania, line.

In July 1877, the station was the site of riots and clashes between the Maryland National Guard and strikers during the Baltimore railroad strike, which occurred as part of the Great Railroad Strike of the same year. Some in the crowd attempted to set fire to the station, and nearby buildings associated with the Baltimore & Ohio Railroad, but were largely unsuccessful.

Beginning in 1897, Camden Station also had lower-level platforms for B&O's New York–Washington passenger trains, which used the Howard Street tunnel to reach Mount Royal Station. The first mainline electrification of a steam railroad in the U.S. occurred at Camden Station on June 27, 1895, when an electric locomotive pulled a Royal Blue train through the Howard Street tunnel.

=== 20th century ===
EMC EA-EB #51, the first streamlined, non-articulated diesel locomotive, on B&O's Royal Blue at Camden Station's lower level in 1937

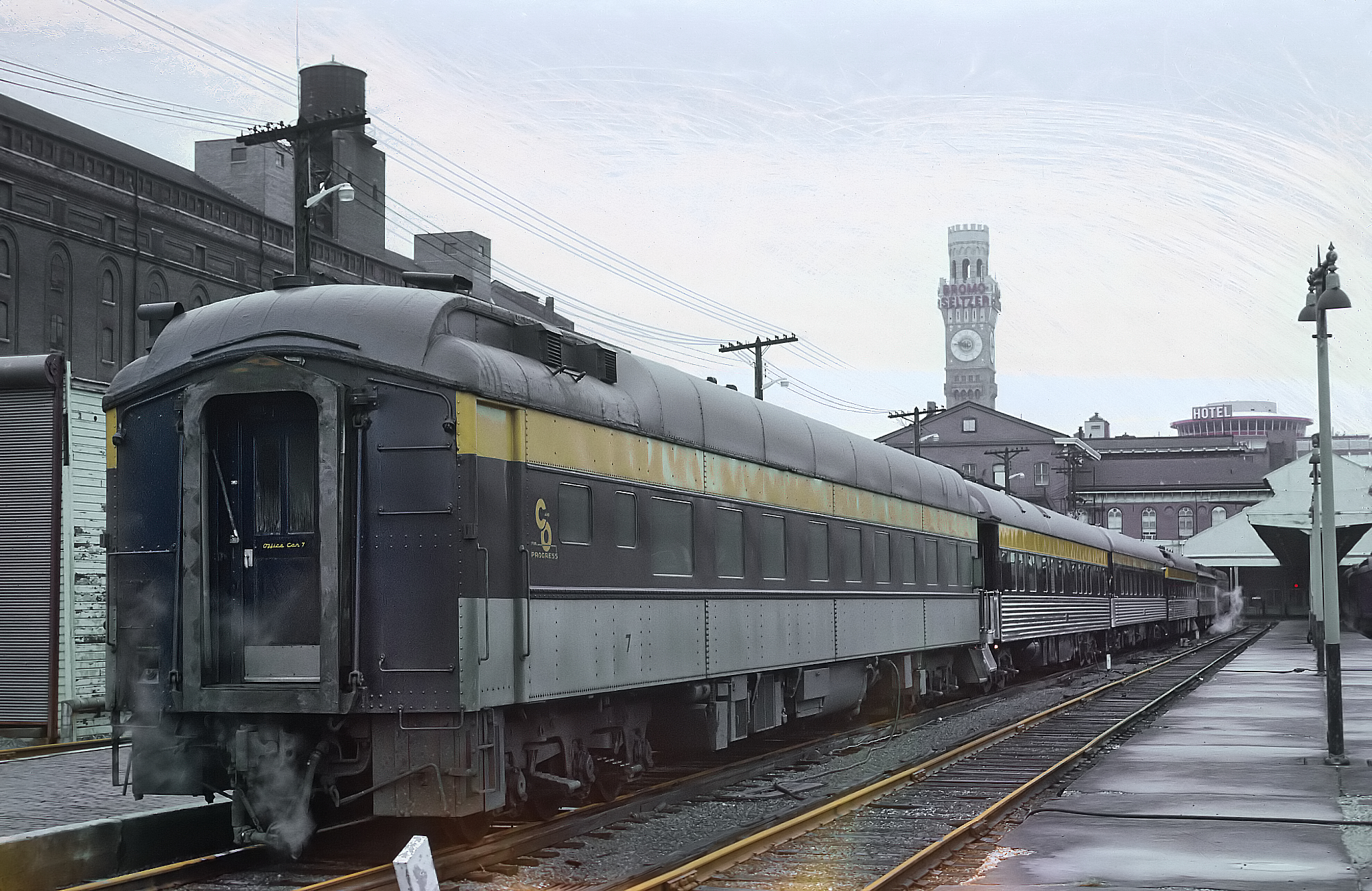
Chesapeake and Ohio car pictured in 1969

In 1912, the B&O remodeled the central waiting room, enlarging it and adding oak panelling with marble wainscoting for the Democratic National Convention, held in Baltimore that year. The Annapolis & Baltimore Short Line Railroad also used Camden Station for its trains to Annapolis, Maryland, beginning in 1887. Except for an interval between 1921 and 1935, when the successor Washington, Baltimore and Annapolis Electric Railway (WB&A) used a separate station at Howard and Lombard Streets, frequent electric interurban trains to Maryland's capitol served Camden station until February 5, 1950, when WB&A successor Baltimore and Annapolis Railroad replaced rail passenger service with buses.

The first streamlined, non-articulated diesel locomotive in the U.S., EMC EA-EB #51, began using Camden Station's lower-level platforms in 1937, pulling the B&O's famed Royal Blue. In addition to its New York–Washington service and frequent commuter trains to Washington, the B&O also operated extensive long-distance service at Camden Station to such cities as Chicago, Detroit, Cleveland, and St. Louis. The Capitol Limited, Shenandoah, and Washington–Chicago Express to Chicago, the National Limited, Diplomat, and Metropolitan Special to St. Louis and the Ambassador and a section of the Shenandoah to Detroit were among the many trains arriving and departing daily from the station during the first half of the 20th century. When the modern-era Major League Baseball Baltimore Orioles began playing in Baltimore, they arrived at Camden by B&O train from Detroit for their inaugural home opening game of the 1954 season.

Declining rail passenger traffic in the 1950s and 1960s led to substantial reductions in passenger train arrivals and departures at the venerable station. On April 26, 1958, the B&O discontinued all passenger service to Philadelphia and New York, and Camden Station's lower-level platforms were used thereafter only for a few trains that continued to Mount Royal Station. When Mount Royal closed in 1961, the lower-level platforms were removed. Today, the lower level tracks and the Howard Street tunnel continue to be extensively used by freight trains of B&O's successor CSX Transportation, as part of its mainline system. The inception of Amtrak on May 1, 1971 marked the demise of all B&O long-haul passenger service. Thereafter, only B&O's local commuter trains, mostly Budd Rail Diesel Cars, continued to use Camden Station. The Baltimore Sun commentator Jacques Kelly described Camden Station in its twilight years of B&O operation in the 1980s: "Spotlessly maintained, it radiated the goodwill and a non-arrogant style typical of B&O employees ... its golden oak benches and large overhead lamps were maintained in the same pristine condition as when they welcomed delegates to the 1912 Democratic Presidential Convention."

== Current operations ==
The rail station is now served by both the Baltimore Light Rail and MARC's Camden Line commuter rail to Washington, D.C. Baltimore Light Rail provides southbound direct service to BWI Airport and Glen Burnie, and northbound to Mount Royal, Lutherville-Timonium, and Hunt Valley.

The MTA's Light Rail began service around the time that Oriole Park at Camden Yards opened. Its schedules refer to the stop as "Camden Yards"; its name derives from the B&O's freight yards that were part of the site. While Camden Station is considered the official stop for Oriole Park, many Orioles fans also stop at the nearby Convention Center station, which is located near the stadium's main entrance. The adjacent B&O Warehouse is now part of the stadium, looming over the stadium's right field wall.

The station also sees frequent use for Baltimore Ravens games at M&T Bank Stadium, though that stadium's official stop is Stadium/Federal Hill station.

Although MARC schedules still refer to the Camden Line's terminus as "Camden Station", only the station's platforms are now used. The station is served by three island platforms, and six tracks. MARC trains use three tracks and the west and center platforms, and light rail uses three tracks (the third track helps to turn trains which run the Penn Station-Camden Route) and the center and east platforms. The center platform is unique as it accommodates both the high level MARC equipment, and the low level light rail equipment. This is accomplished with different track heights. The MARC track is 48 inches (1,219 mm) below the platform, which allows for level boarding. The light rail track is at the same height as the platform.

In 1992 a space frame over two trailers was constructed to serve as a station building, intended to be used for only a few years before replacement with a permanent structure. In November 2016, the state secured a $7.5 million federal grant to help construct a permanent station structure. This new building opened to passengers on September 12, 2019, and serves as the current station for MARC and Light Rail operations. Upgrades included an expanded indoor waiting area, restrooms, new ticketing machines, bike racks, and improved informational displays.

The original B&O station building is no longer used for train passengers. In May, 2005, a new sports museum, the Sports Legends Museum at Camden Yards, opened in the original Camden Station structure. The following year, Geppi's Entertainment Museum opened above the Sports Legends museum. Sports Legends closed in 2015; Geppi's closed in 2018.

MARC and Light Rail operations at Camden Station

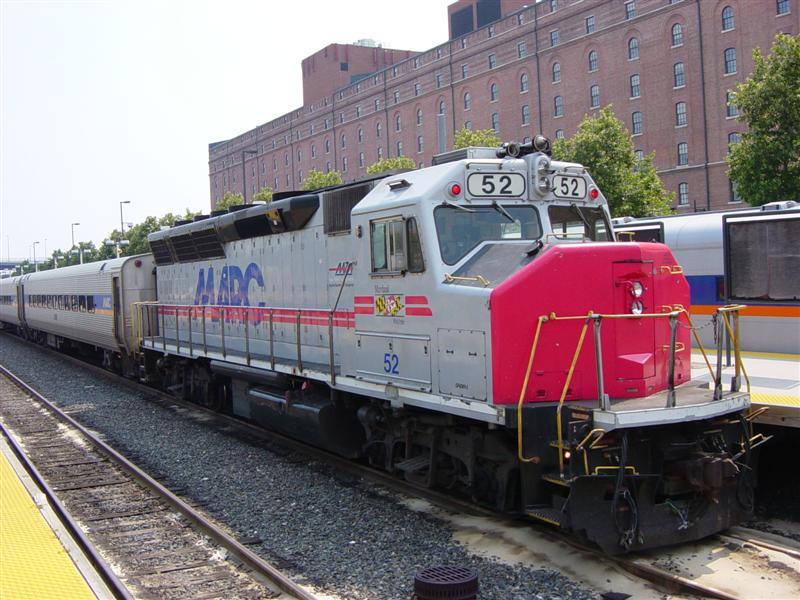
EMD GP40WH-2 #52 at Camden Station, July 2, 2004

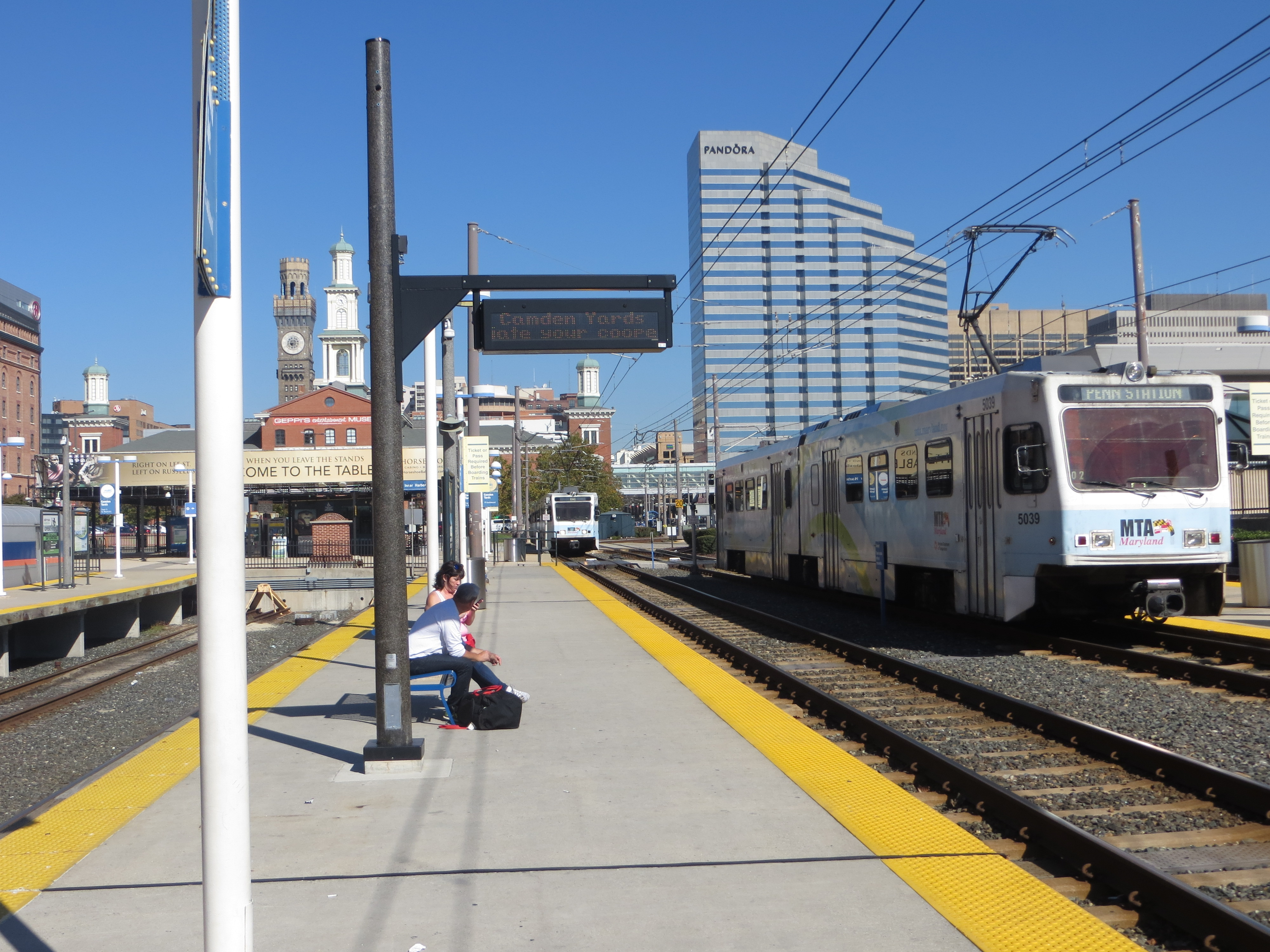
Light Rail train heading north

A MARC train departing the station

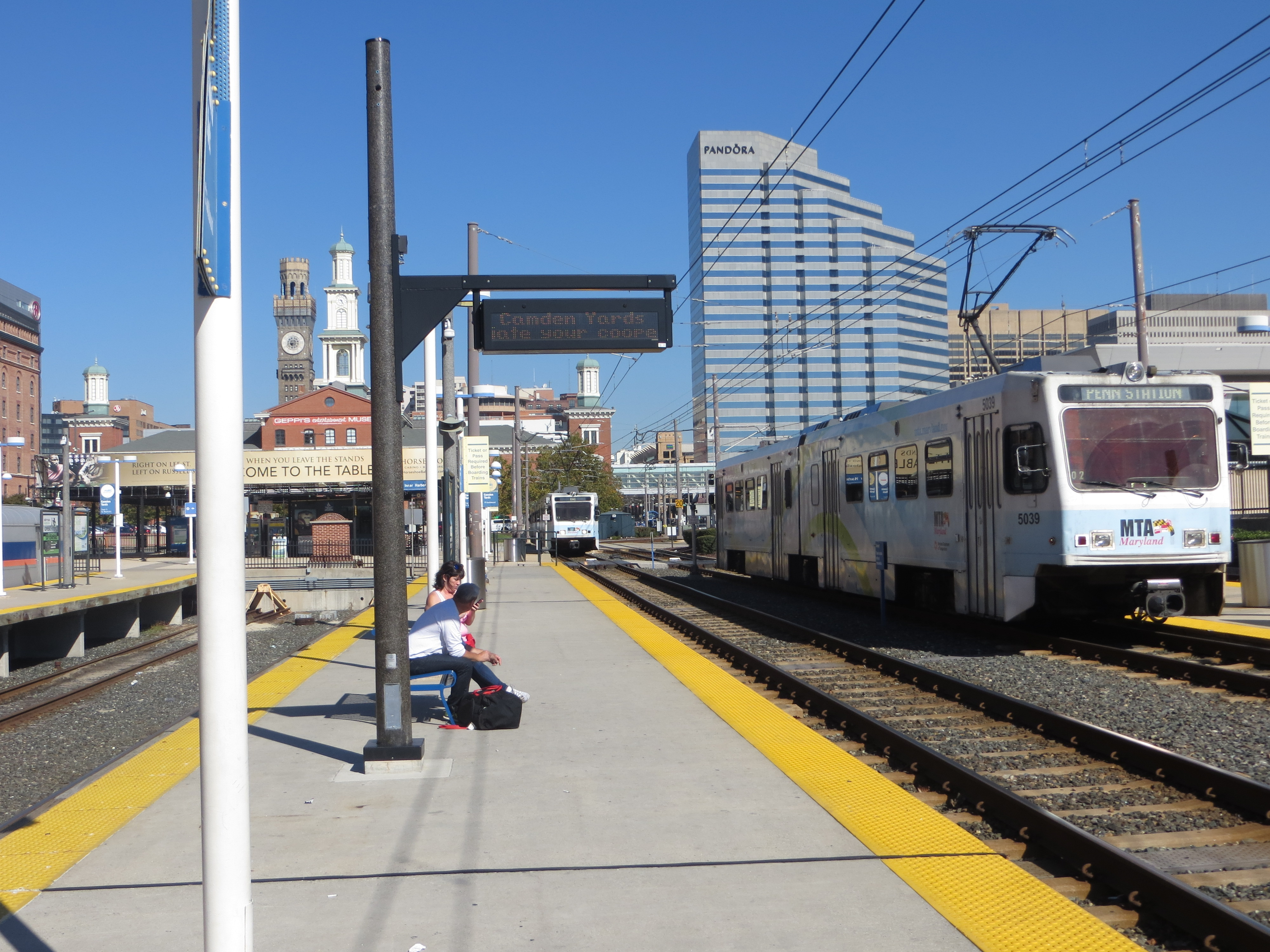
Looking down the light rail platforms

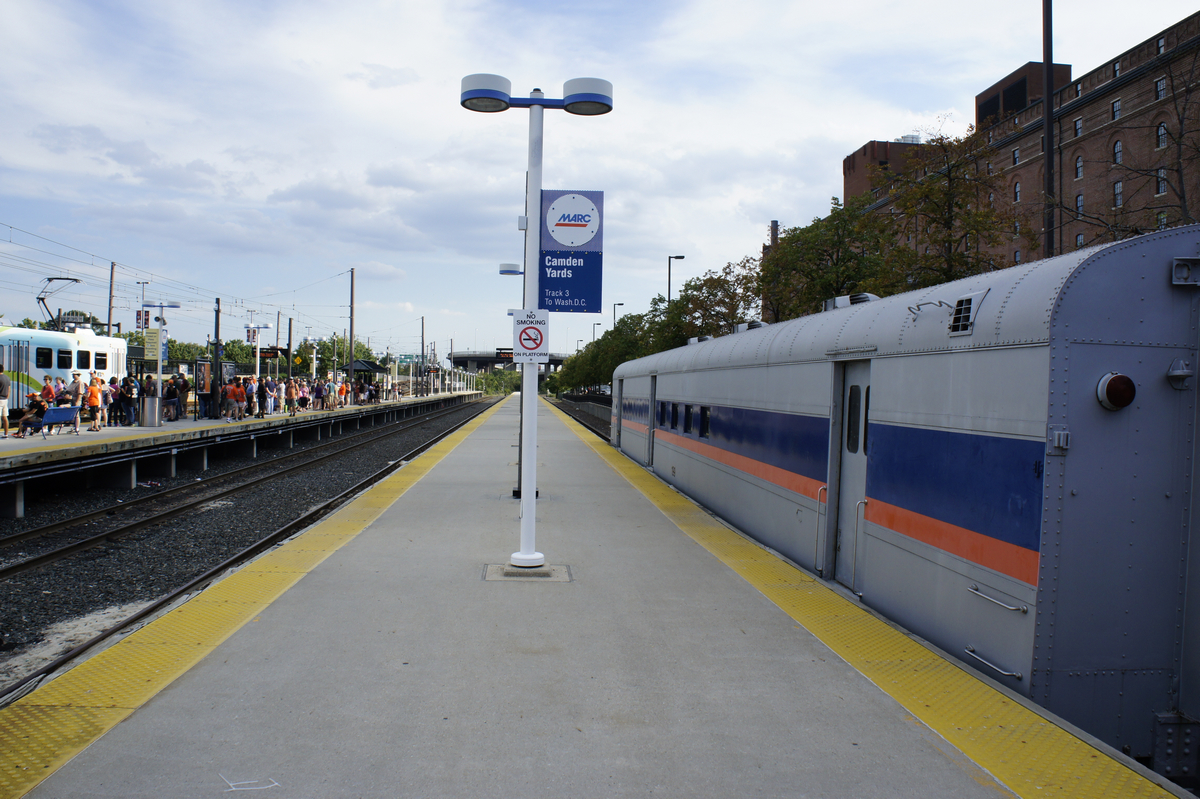
Older baggage car occupying one of the tracks

== See also ==
- Baltimore Belt Line
- Baltimore Civil War Museum
- Baltimore Terminal Subdivision (CSX)
- Philadelphia, Wilmington and Baltimore Railroad
- President Street Station
- Longworth Hall, a similar building in Cincinnati
