= Capital Subdivision =

Railway line in Maryland and District of Columbia

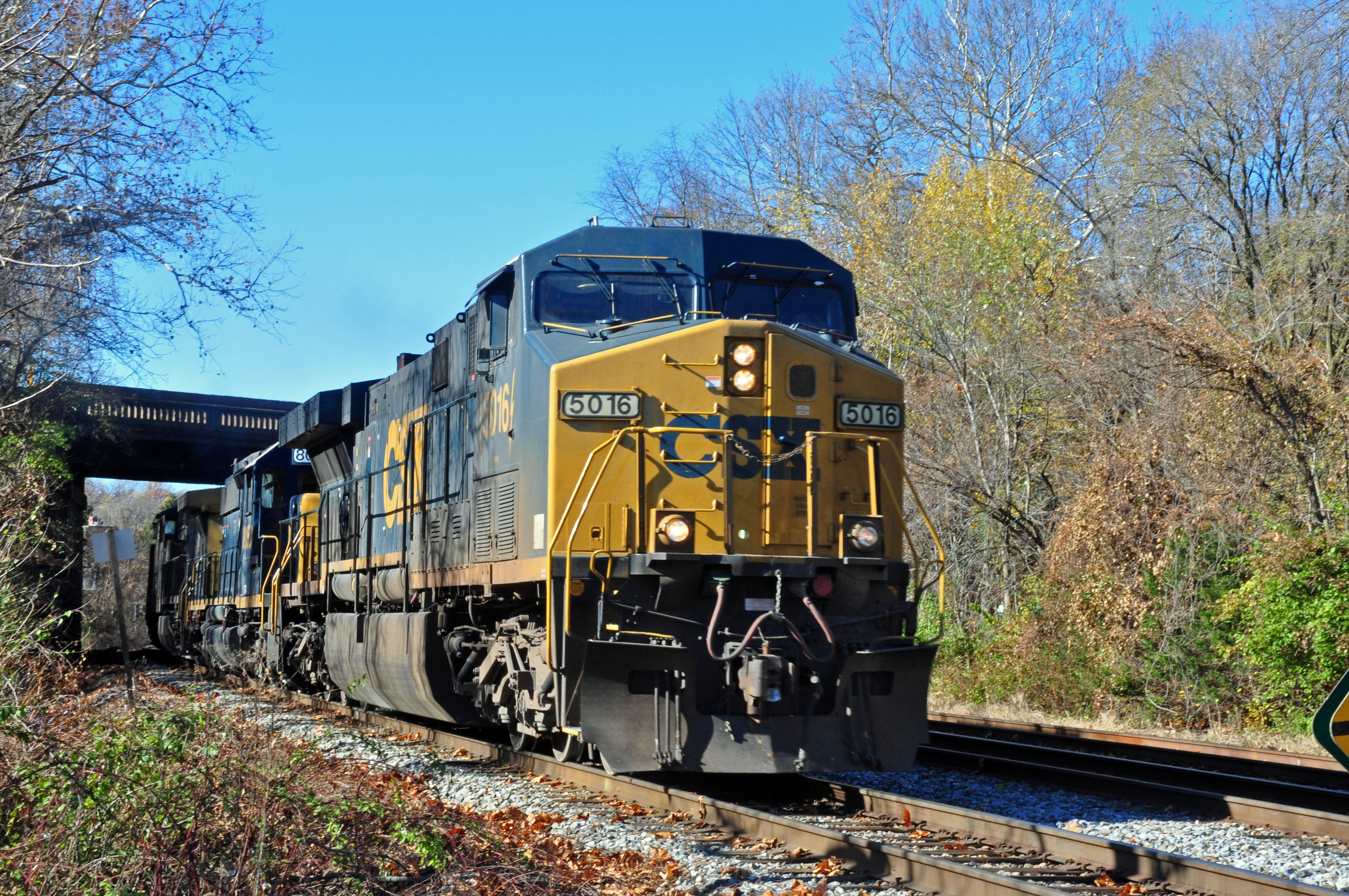
Northbound CSX train on the Capital Subdivision at St. Denis

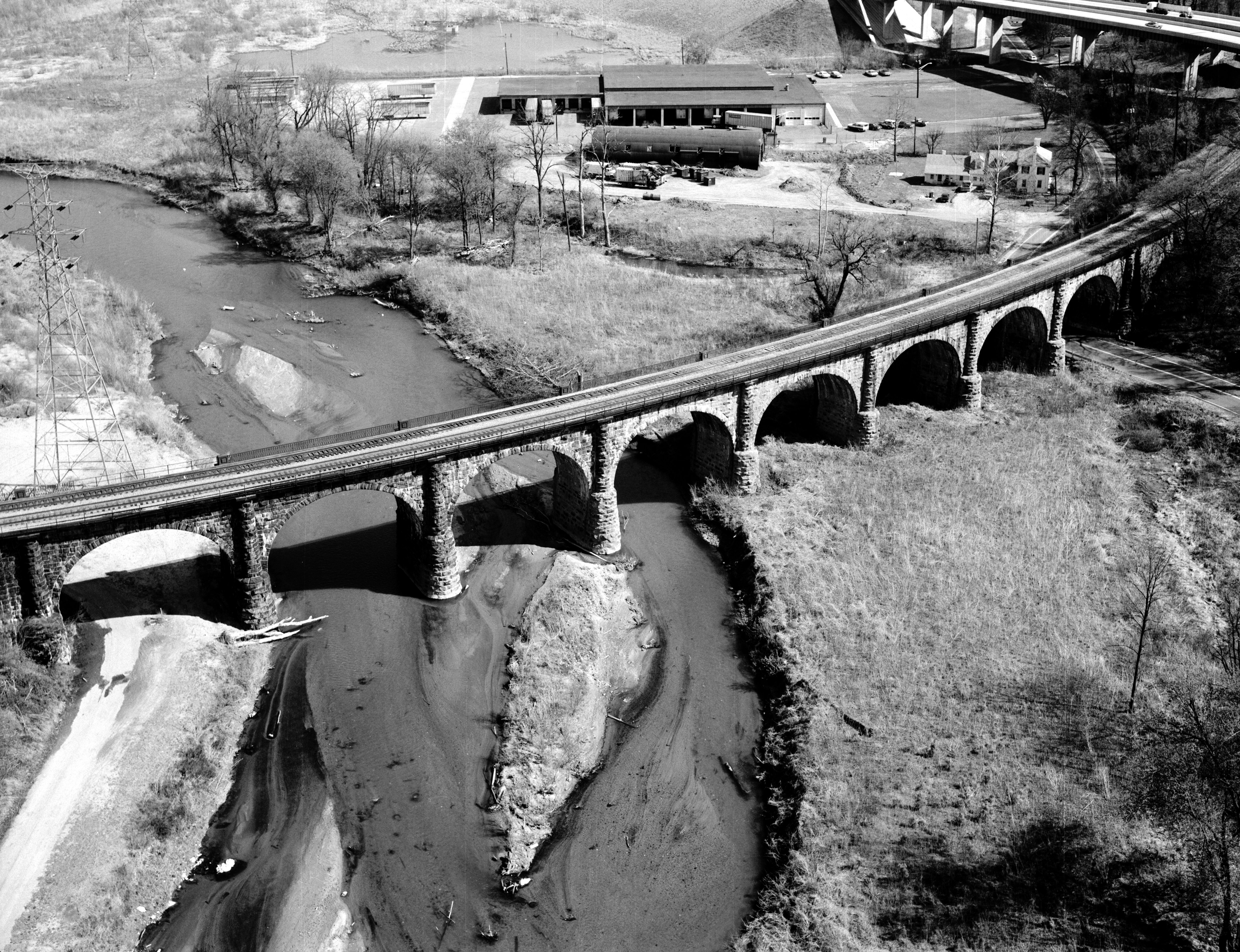
The Thomas Viaduct, built in 1835 over the Patapsco River, was the largest bridge in the United States at that time. It still carries the Capital Subdivision today and is the world's oldest multiple arched stone railroad bridge.

Capital Subdivision

The Capital Subdivision is a railroad line owned and operated by CSX Transportation in the U.S. state of Maryland and the District of Columbia. The line runs from near Baltimore, Maryland, southwest to Washington, D.C., along the former Baltimore and Ohio Rail Road (B&O) Washington Branch. The subdivision's Alexandria Extension provides a connection to Virginia and points south.

== Route description ==
The northeast end of the line is at Halethorpe, Maryland, (BAA 5.8) just north of the historic Thomas Viaduct, where it meets the Baltimore Terminal Subdivision and the Old Main Line Subdivision. Its southwest end is at the yard north of Washington Union Station, at a junction with the Metropolitan Subdivision and Amtrak's Northeast Corridor.

Between Elkridge and Laurel (BAA 21.7), the Capital Subdivision's rail alignment forms the border between Howard and Anne Arundel counties, having been built before Howard County was created from western Anne Arundel County in 1844.

MARC Train's Camden Line, descended from B&O commuter service between Baltimore and Washington, operates over the entire length of the main line.

== History ==
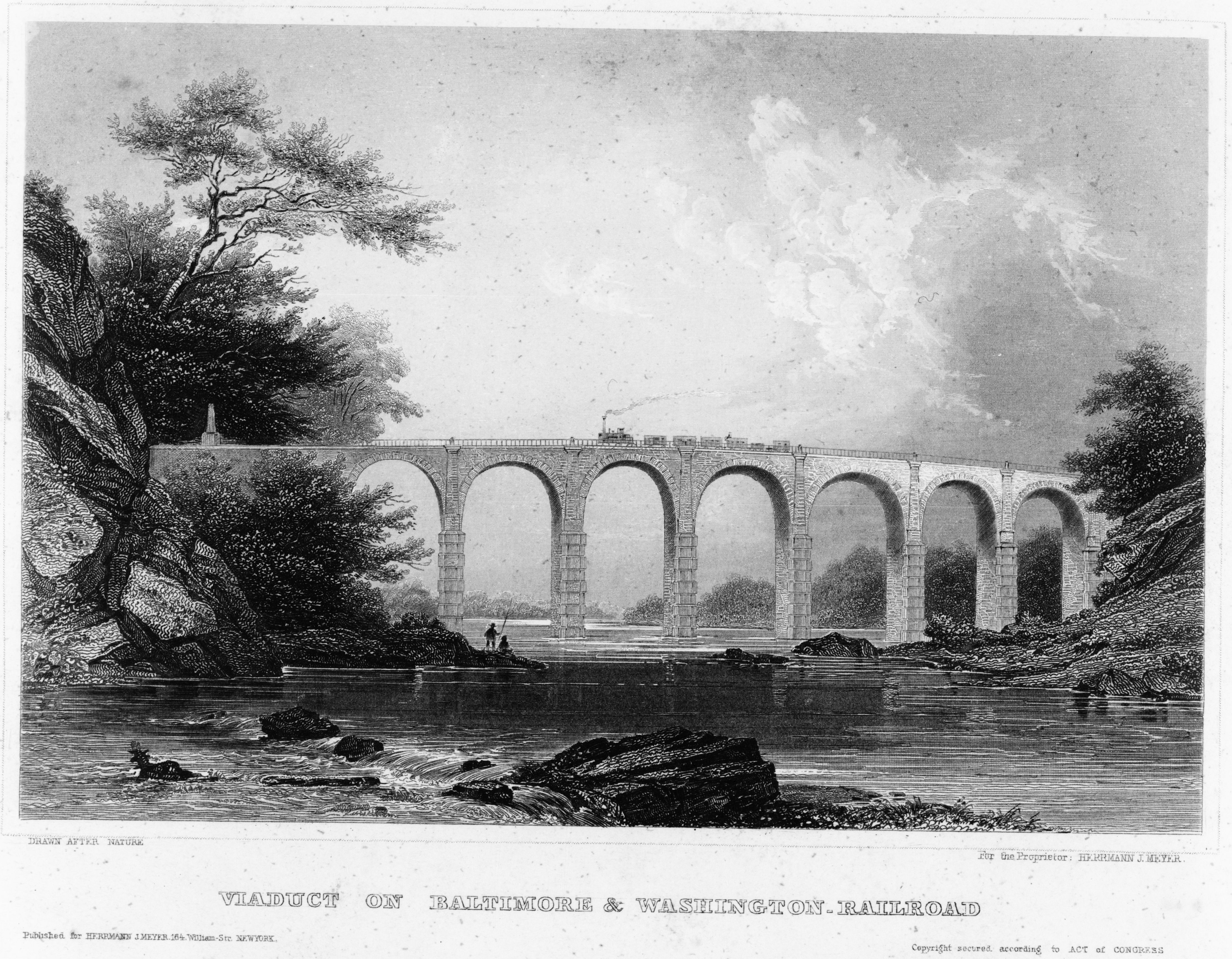
The Thomas Viaduct about 20 years after its construction in 1835

In 1831, the Maryland General Assembly authorized the B&O to build a branch from their main line within eight miles (13 km) of Baltimore, to Washington, D.C. As this line would take much business from the parallel turnpikes, especially the Washington and Baltimore Turnpike, the charter specifically allowed those companies to subscribe to the stock of the railroad. Construction began in July 1833, and the line opened on August 25, 1835, splitting from the B&O main line at Relay, roughly 7 miles (11 km) from Baltimore.

Notable structural features on the original line include the Thomas Viaduct, the first multi-span masonry railroad bridge in the United States, and the largest bridge in the country when it was completed in 1835; and the earliest example of an iron truss bridge designed by Wendel Bollman and installed at Savage.

=== Washington, D.C. depots ===
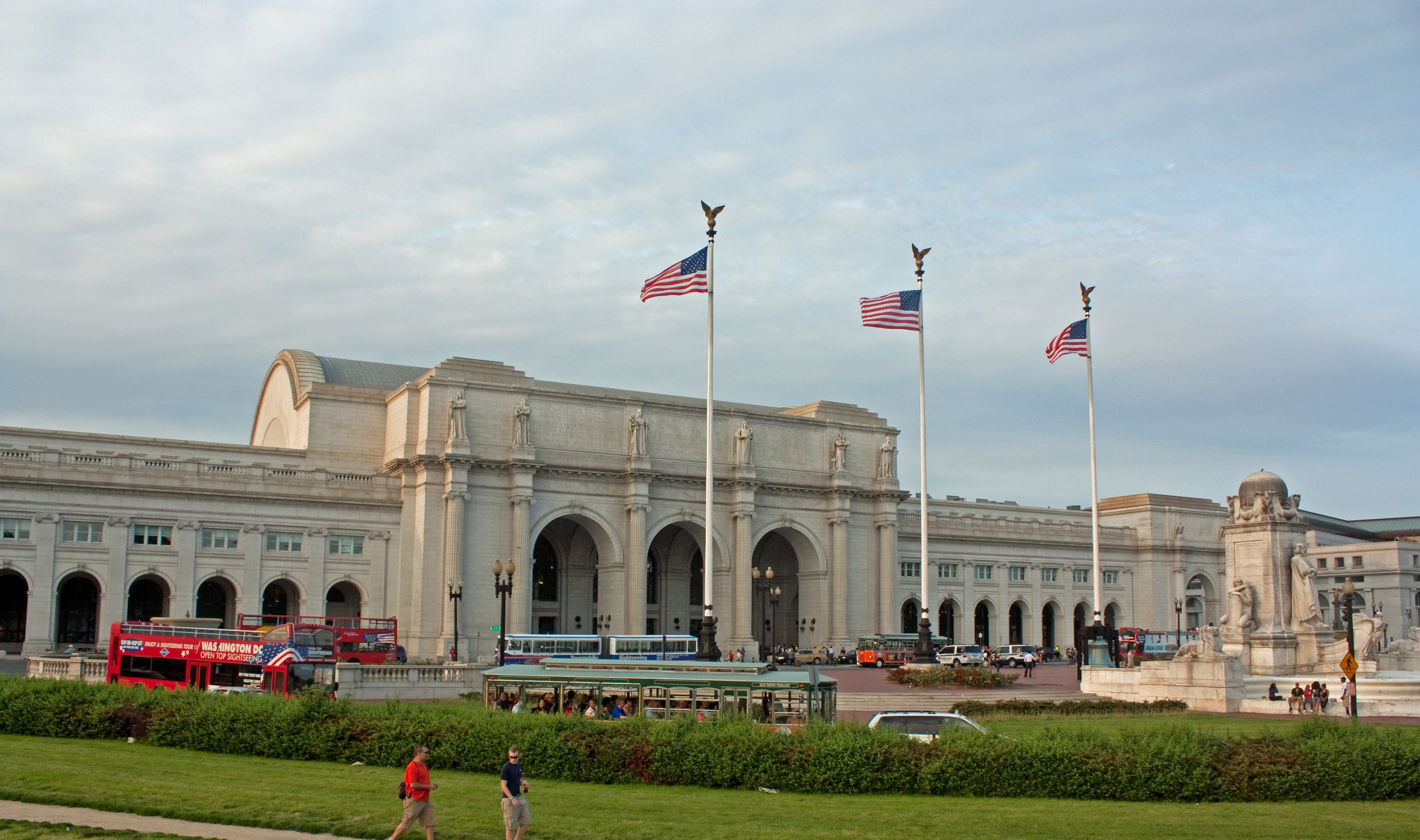
Washington Union Station in Washington, D.C.

The first B&O passenger station (1835–1851) was located west of the Capitol, at 2nd Street and Pennsylvania Avenue NW. In 1851, the New Jersey Avenue Station was built at a point slightly north of the Capitol, on New Jersey Avenue NW, in the area now called Union Station Plaza. Trains reached that location via the current location of West Virginia Avenue, street-running trackage on I Street NE and Delaware Avenue, and private right-of-way just south of the current location of Louisiana Avenue. When the Washington Terminal Company opened Washington Union Station in 1907, that alignment was changed to the current routing, partially using the former location of Delaware Avenue.

=== Acquisition ===
The Chesapeake and Ohio Railway acquired control of the B&O in 1962, and the B&O and C&O both became a subsidiaries of the Chessie System in 1973 (Along with the Western Maryland Railway). In 1980 the Chessie System merged with the Seaboard System to form CSX Corporation. In 1987 the CSX Corporation merged the B&O into the C&O, then, later that same year, merged the C&O into CSX Transportation (CSXT), which now owns the line.

== See also ==
- List of CSX Transportation lines
