= Arthur Bremer =

Attempted assassin of George Wallace (born 1950)

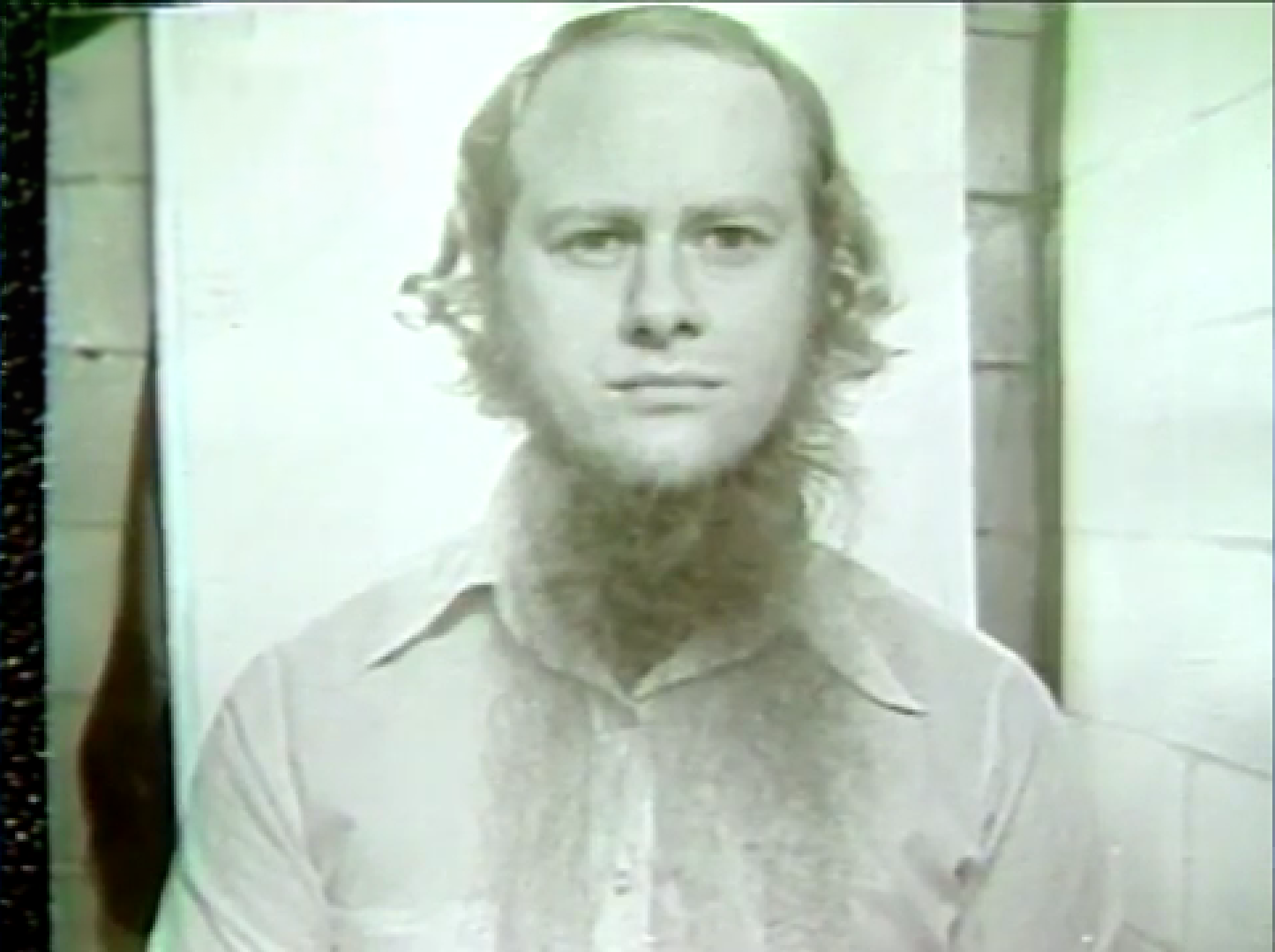
- 1982 mug shot of Bremer
- Born: Arthur Herman Bremer; August 21, 1950 (age 76); Milwaukee, Wisconsin, U.S.
- Occupation: Busboy/janitor
- Parent(s): William Bremer (father); Sylvia Bremer (mother)
- Status: Paroled
- Motive: Fame (Note: After the diary was read as evidence in court (including a passage where Bremer wonders whether Wallace's death will bring enough media coverage), William V. Shannon commented, "He... wanted to have his face flashed on millions of television screens and his name printed on the front pages of every newspaper." Psychologist James W. Clarke notes, "Bremer had never been interested in politics... any prominent political leader would do since it was not ideology which motivated" him.)
- Convictions: 9 counts (Note: Assault with intent to murder (4 counts); Use of a handgun during a crime of violence (4 counts); Unlawful transportation of a handgun)
- Penalty: 53 years imprisonment (released after 35 years)

Details
- Date: May 15, 1972
- Locations: Laurel, Maryland, U.S.
- Injured: 4 (including George Wallace)
- Weapon: Charter Arms Undercover .38-caliber revolver

Arthur Herman Bremer (/ˈbrɛmər/; born August 21, 1950) is an American convicted criminal who attempted to assassinate U.S. Democratic presidential candidate George Wallace on May 15, 1972, in Laurel, Maryland, leaving Wallace permanently paralyzed from the waist down. Bremer was found guilty and sentenced to 63 years (53 years after an appeal) in a Maryland prison for the shooting of Wallace and three bystanders. After 35 years of incarceration, Bremer was released from prison on November 9, 2007.

== Life and education ==
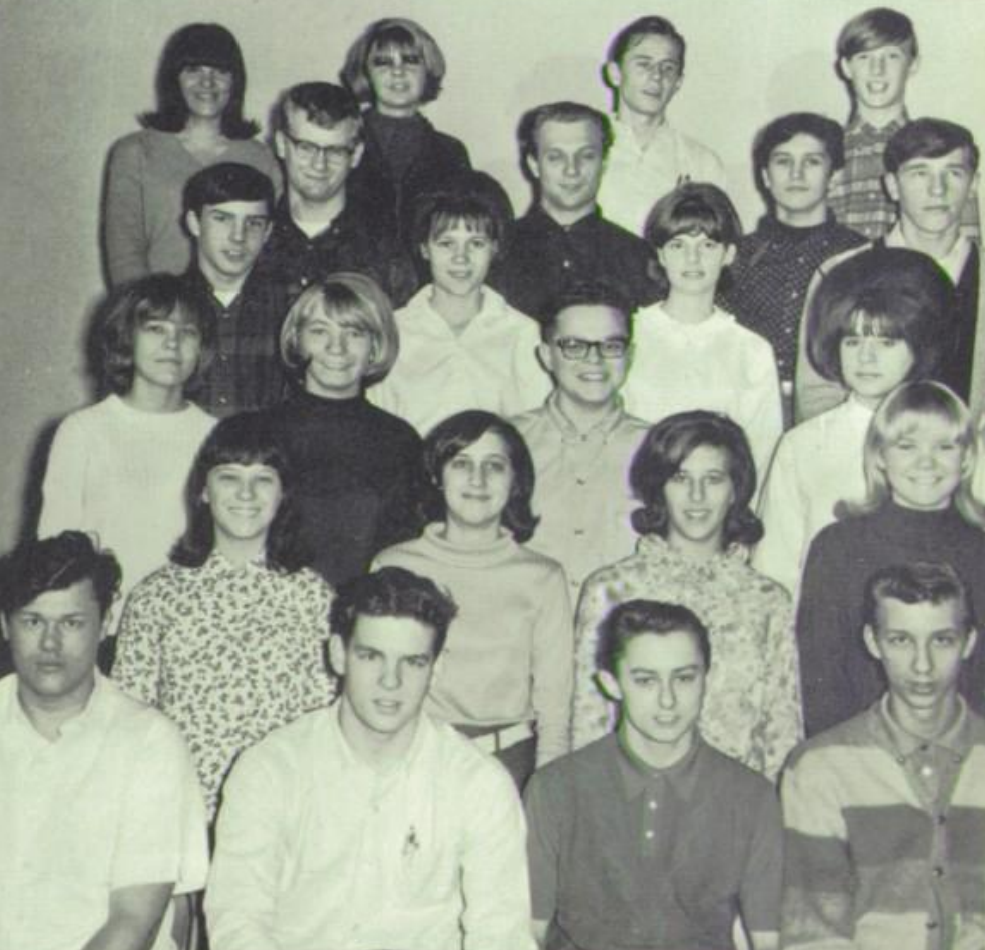
Bremer with his high school sophomore year class, 1967.

Bremer was born in St. Joseph's Hospital, in St. Joseph, Wisconsin, A neighborhood in Milwaukee. He was the third of four sons, to William and Sylvia Bremer. He was raised by his working-class parents on the south side of Milwaukee and lived in a dysfunctional household. Bremer stated "I would escape my ugly reality by pretending that I was living with a television family and there was no yelling at home or no one to hit me."

Though he played football with the freshman-sophomore team and tried out for the wrestling team during the 1966–67 school year, Bremer did not make friends, and he remained a solitary student until his 1969 graduation from South Division High School.

After graduating from high school, Bremer briefly attended Milwaukee Area Technical College, studying aerial photography, art, writing, and psychology; he dropped out after one semester.

Bremer was employed as a busboy at the Milwaukee Athletic Club from March 1969. In 1971, Bremer was demoted to kitchen work after customers complained that he talked to himself and that "he whistled and marched in tune with music played in the dining room." Angered by his demotion, Bremer complained to the program planner for the Milwaukee Commission on Community Relations. The complaint was investigated and dismissed. Bremer quit his job at the Athletic Club on February 16, 1972.

On September 1, 1970, Bremer got a part-time job working as a janitor at Story Elementary School, which he quit after almost 18 months, on January 31, 1972. On October 16, 1971, after an argument, Bremer moved from his parents' house to a three-room one-bedroom apartment near Marquette University, where he lived until May 9, 1972.

Late on the night of November 18, 1971, Bremer was arrested for carrying a concealed weapon and for parking in a no-parking zone. A court-appointed psychiatrist declared Bremer mentally ill, yet stable enough to continue to live in the community. Bremer was released after paying a $38.50 fine. On December 8, 1971, Bremer pleaded guilty to disorderly conduct.

On January 13, 1972, Bremer went into the Casanova Gun Shop in Milwaukee, and bought a snub-nosed Charter Arms Undercover .38-caliber revolver for $90 (equivalent to $723.09 in 2026)

=== Plans to assassinate Richard Nixon ===
After a short relationship ended and he quit both of his jobs, on March 1, 1972, Bremer began his diary with the words "It is my personal plan to assassinate by pistol either Richard Nixon or George Wallace. I intend to shoot one or the other while he attends a campaign rally for the Wisconsin Primary."

On April 10, Bremer traveled from Milwaukee to Ottawa, which Nixon was about to visit. Three days later, dressed in a business suit with a "Vote Republican" sticker on, wearing sunglasses and with a revolver in his pocket, Bremer went out intending to assassinate Nixon, but found no opportunity. Security was tight, making it impossible for Bremer to get close enough to Nixon, and he doubted whether any bullets would go through the bulletproof glass of Nixon's presidential limousine.

Three days later, on April 13, Bremer thought he saw Nixon's limousine outside of the Centre Block, but it had disappeared by the time he could retrieve his revolver from his hotel room.

== George Wallace assassination attempt ==
=== Planning ===
On May 4, 1972, after a 10-day break from writing, Bremer realized it would be almost impossible to assassinate Nixon and decided that it was Wallace's "fate" to be his victim, even though his diary entries never showed the same level of interest or enthusiasm as they did with regard to assassinating Nixon. Bremer made this clear in his diary writing, "He [Wallace] certainly won't be buried with the snobs in Washington. ... I won't even rate a TV interruption in Russia or/Europe when the news breaks—they never heard of Wallace." The following day, he checked out two books from the public library in Milwaukee, both detailing the assassination of Senator Robert F. Kennedy by Sirhan Sirhan: Sirhan by Aziz Shihab and "R.F.K. Must Die!" by Robert Blair Kaiser.

Despite his lack of enthusiasm, early on the morning of May 9, 1972, Bremer took a car ferry to Ludington, Michigan, and visited the Wallace campaign headquarters in Silver Lake, and offered to be a volunteer. That week, he attended Wallace rallies in Lansing and Cadillac.

On the afternoon of May 13, Kalamazoo police received an anonymous phone call saying a suspicious looking person had been sitting in a car near the National Guard Armory. When questioned, Bremer said he was waiting for the Wallace rally to begin and wanted to get a good seat. Bremer was photographed at the rally that evening, where he had a clear opportunity to shoot his target, but according to his diary, he did not do so because he might have shattered some glass and blinded some "stupid 15-year-olds" who stood nearby.

The following day, Bremer set off for Maryland and made his final diary entry.

=== Shooting ===
Bremer turned up in Wheaton, Maryland for Wallace's noon rally at the Wheaton Plaza shopping center on May 15, 1972. He was dressed in patriotic red, white, and blue, wearing his new campaign button that read "Wallace in 1972", and dark sunglasses. He strongly applauded Wallace, in contrast with many others present, who heckled and taunted the speaker. Two tomatoes were thrown at Wallace during the rally, but both missed. Based on this reception, Wallace refused to shake hands with anyone present, denying Bremer the opportunity to carry out his plan.

At a second rally at Laurel Shopping Center, 16 miles (26 km) away in Laurel, Maryland, there was minor heckling, but it did not last. About 1,000 people were present; they were mostly quiet and it was generally a friendly crowd. After he had finished speaking, Wallace shook hands with some of those present, against the advice of his Secret Service guards. At approximately 4 p.m., Bremer pushed his way forward, aimed his .38 revolver at Wallace's abdomen and opened fire, emptying the weapon before he could be subdued. He hit Wallace four times. Wallace fell back and lost a pint of blood, going into a mild state of shock. One bullet lodged in his spinal cord; the others hit Wallace in the abdomen and chest. Three others present were wounded unintentionally: State Trooper Captain E.C. Dothard, Wallace's personal bodyguard, who was shot in the stomach; Dora Thompson, a campaign volunteer, who was shot in the leg; and Nick Zarvos, a Secret Service agent. Zarvos was shot in the neck, and his speech was severely impaired following the shooting.

Bremer had planned to yell his carefully chosen catchphrase, "A penny for your thoughts!", as he shot Wallace. However, in the heat of the assassination attempt, he forgot to do so. A television cameraman captured footage of the shooting.

=== Arrest ===
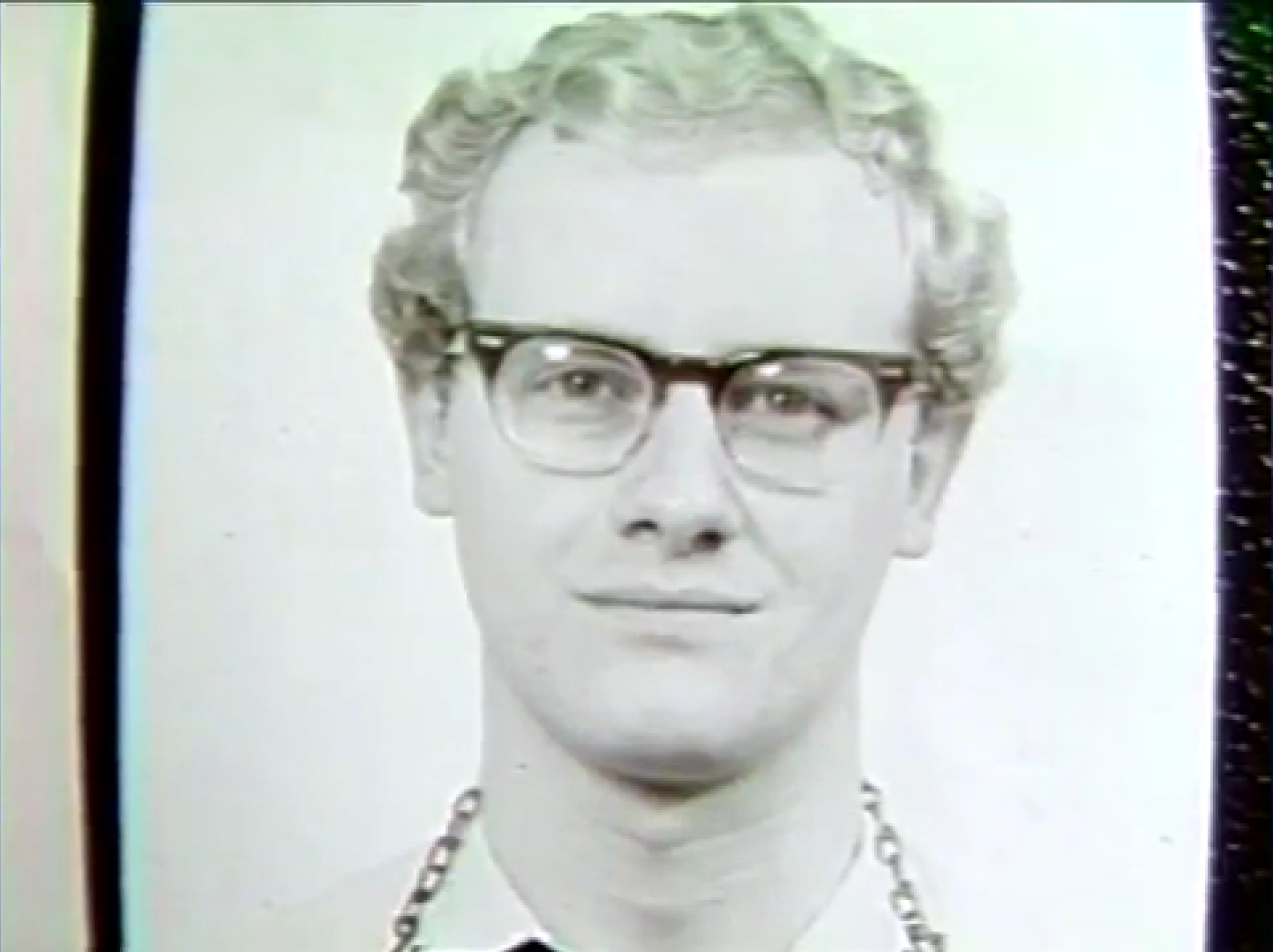
Bremer's mugshot after his arrest.

After emptying his revolver, Bremer was wrestled to the ground and then arrested.

After searching Bremer's car, police described it as a "hotel on wheels". In it they found blankets, pillows, a blue steel 9 mm Browning Hi-Power semi-automatic pistol with a 13-round magazine, binoculars, a woman's umbrella, a tape recorder, a portable radio with police band, an electric shaver, photographic equipment, a garment bag with several changes of clothes, a toilet kit, a 1972 copy of a Writers' Yearbook, and the two books he had borrowed from the Milwaukee public library 10 days earlier.

=== Break-in plot ===
In a widely noted article, journalist Seymour Hersh claimed that secret recordings of Nixon prove that, within hours of the assassination attempt, the president and a top aide dispatched a political operative, E. Howard Hunt, to Milwaukee with plans to surreptitiously enter Bremer's apartment and plant the campaign literature of Democratic contender George McGovern. According to Hersh, Hunt aborted the operation because the FBI had sealed off Bremer's apartment prior to his arrival.

In his memoir, Hunt reports that the day after the assassination attempt he received a call from Chuck Colson, Nixon's close confidante and advisor, asking him to break into Bremer's apartment and plant "leftist literature to connect him to the Democrats". Hunt recalls that he was highly skeptical of the plan due to the apartment being guarded by the FBI but investigated the feasibility of it anyway at Colson's insistence. G. Gordon Liddy also discusses the plan in his memoir.

== Trial ==
Bremer's trial in Upper Marlboro, Maryland, was condensed to five days and began on July 31, 1972, only two and a half months after he had shot Wallace. The defense argued that Bremer had schizophrenia and was legally insane at the time of the shooting, and that he had "no emotional capacity to understand anything." Arthur Marshall, for the prosecution, told the court that Bremer, while disturbed and in need of psychiatric help and treatment, knew what he was doing, had been seeking glory, and was still sorry that Wallace had not died.

Jonas Rappeport, the chief psychiatrist for the circuit court in Baltimore, who spent a total of nine hours with Bremer in June 1972 on four occasions, said Bremer had a "schizoid personality disorder with some paranoid and psychopathic features", but also stated that this did not "substantially impair his capacity to understand the criminality of his actions."

On August 4, 1972, the jury of six men and six women took 95 minutes to reach their verdict. Bremer was sentenced to 63 years in prison for shooting Wallace and three other people. When asked if he had anything to say, Bremer replied, "Well, Mr. Marshall mentioned that he would like society to be protected from someone like me. Looking back on my life I would have liked it if society had protected me from myself. That's all I have to say at this time." The sentence was reduced to 53 years on September 28, 1972, after an appeal. On July 6, 1973, Bremer's second appeal to have the sentence reduced further was rejected.

=== Aftermath ===
Although Bremer's actions, arrest, trial, and conviction attracted media and public attention, he soon faded into comparative obscurity. As he had predicted in May 1972, he did not reach the level of infamy of Lee Harvey Oswald or John Wilkes Booth, both of whom had assassinated presidents.

A 113-page portion of Bremer's diary was published in 1973 as An Assassin's Diary; it covers the period from April 4, 1972—which, coincidentally, was the day on which George McGovern won the Wisconsin primary—to the day before Bremer shot Wallace.

On August 26, 1980, an earlier part of Bremer's diary, dated from March 1 to April 3, 1972, (pp. 1–148) was found where he had concealed it, heavily wrapped in a plastic suitcase at the foot of Milwaukee's 27th Street viaduct. In it, Bremer discusses his desire to kill Nixon and a fantasy about killing unnamed individuals who had angered him. He also imagines opening fire at random at the corner of 3rd Street and Wisconsin Avenue downtown. The diary was eventually sold to an official of the University of Alabama at Birmingham, who donated it to UAB's Reynolds Historical Library.

Bremer's assassination attempt did not end Wallace's political career. Wallace was subsequently elected governor of Alabama twice, in 1974 and 1982. However, the result of the assassination attempt, combined with changes in Wallace's personal and general political circumstances, ended his presidential aspirations. Public concerns over Wallace's health meant he would never gain the momentum he had in the 1972 campaign. He entered the presidential election race in 1976 but withdrew early due to lack of significant support.

Wallace forgave Bremer in August 1995 and wrote to him expressing the hope that the two could get to know each other better. Bremer did not reply. Wallace died on September 13, 1998.

=== Sentence and release ===
Bremer served his sentence at the Maryland Correctional Institution (MCI-H) in Hagerstown. He was placed in solitary confinement for 30 days after a fight on October 6, 1972. He was reprimanded after another fight in December 1972, and then placed in solitary again for 30 days after a third fight in February 1973. In prison, he declined to receive mental health treatment or evaluation. He worked in the prison library and was described by the chairman of the Maryland Parole Commission, David Blumberg, as "compliant and unobtrusive." He was visited multiple times by his parents before they died.

According to 1997 parole records, psychological testing indicated releasing him would be risky. He argued in his June 1996 hearing that "[s]hooting segregationist dinosaurs wasn't as bad as harming mainstream politicians." Bremer was released from prison on November 9, 2007, at the age of 57, having served 35 years of his original sentence. His probation ended on May 15, 2025.

Conditions of his release included electronic monitoring and staying away from elected officials and candidates. He was ordered to undergo a mental health evaluation and receive treatment if the state deemed it necessary; he could not leave the state without written permission from the state agency that supervised him until the end of his probation.

== In literature and the arts ==
- In John Waters' 1974 film Female Trouble, runaway-turned-criminal Dawn Davenport when listing her reprehensible conduct claims to have "bought the gun Bremer used to shoot Wallace!"
- Bremer's diary was a primary inspiration for screenwriter Paul Schrader's character Travis Bickle, played by Robert De Niro, in Taxi Driver (1976). In turn, Taxi Driver would be one of the inspirations for John Hinckley Jr. to shoot President Ronald Reagan.
- Peter Gabriel's 1980 song "Family Snapshot" was inspired by Bremer's diary, and describes an assassination attempt (with elements from the shooting of John F. Kennedy) from the assassin's perspective.
- James Benning's 1984 experimental film American Dreams: Lost and Found used excerpts of Bremer's diary.
- Bremer is called upon, among other would-be presidential assassins, during the Stephen Sondheim musical Assassins.
- A Penny for Your Thoughts is a short animated documentary (2018) illustrating Bremer's assassination attempt. The source material was Arthur Bremer's diary.
- Actual film footage of Bremer shooting Wallace is featured briefly in the 1994 drama film Forrest Gump.
- Bremer is referenced as having assassinated President Wallace in the alternative future of Stephen King's novel 11/22/63.
- In John Frankenheimer's 1997 film George Wallace, Gary Sinise plays Wallace, and Scott Brantley plays Bremer.
