= Reservoir High School =

Public secondary school in Fulton, Maryland, U.S.

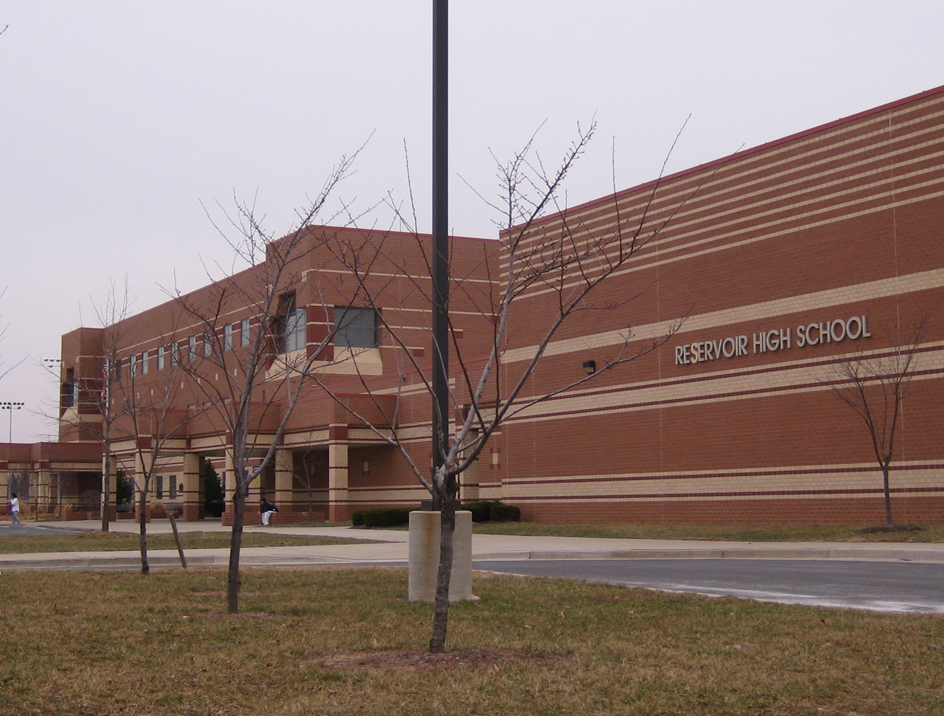

Location
- 11550 Scaggsville Road; Fulton, MD; United States
- 39.15186°N 76.91329°W

Information
- Type: Public Secondary
- Motto: Learn, Achieve, Succeed.
- Established: 2002
- School district: Howard County Public School System
- Principal: Karim Shortridge Ed.D.
- Grades: 9–12
- Enrollment: 1,928 (2023)
- Color: Orange Blue
- Athletics: Girls and Boys Basketball, Football, Soccer, Golf, Softball, Baseball, Volleyball, Tennis, Girls and Boys Lacrosse, Cheerleading, Track and Field(Indoor and Outdoor), Cross Country, Field Hockey, Wrestling
- Mascot: Gator
- Nickname: Resi/The Swamp
- Newspaper: The Gator Gazette
- Yearbook: Gator Yearbook
- Website: http://rhs.hcpss.org

Reservoir High School is a public high school in Fulton, Maryland, United States. It opened in 2002 and is part of the Howard County Public School System. The school is named for its proximity to the Rocky Gorge Reservoir. The school's mascot "Gators" was selected by vote in 2001, with school colors of orange and navy blue. The logo and fight song were the same as those of the Florida Gators. In 2010, a cease and desist order was issued by the University of Florida, forcing the school to create a new logo.

The school is located on Maryland Route 216, just west of U.S. 29 on 101 acres (0.41 km^{2}) shared with Fulton Elementary School, Lime Kiln Middle School, and Cedar Lane School. Reservoir follows the same general design as Long Reach High School and Marriotts Ridge High School. Neighboring Howard County schools include Atholton High School, River Hill High School, and Hammond High School.

Feeder schools for Reservoir include Hammond Middle School, Murray Hill Middle School, Patuxent Valley Middle School, and Lime Kiln Middle School. Reservoir is also well known for its work with and support for students at Cedar Lane School.

== Students ==
Reservoir High School has an official capacity of 1,624 students. After opening in 2002, Reservoir only enrolled 9th and 10th graders to ease the transition of redistricting amongst neighboring high schools. The 2004–2005 school year was the first where there were students of every grade level. The student population at Reservoir has grown moderately since opening.

Student population
2003	2004	2005	2006	2007	2008	2009	2010	2015	2018	2019	2020
607	924	1,315	1,396	1,450	1,504	1,502	1,555	1,551	1,581	1,624	1,788

The racial makeup of the student population during the 2019–2020 school year was 28.0% White, 32.6% Black or African American, 16.2% Asian/Indian, 15.5% Hispanic or Latino, and <5.0% Native American.

== Principals ==
- Adrianne Kaufman 2002–2011
- Patrick Saunderson 2011– 2017
- Nelda Sims 2017–2020
- Karim Shortridge 2020-present

== Athletics ==
- 2023- Girls’ Softball County Champions, Regional Champions, State Runner-Up
- 2022- Girls’ Softball County Champions
- 2022-Girls’ Volleyball County Champions, Regional Champions, State Champions
- 2021- Girls’ Softball County Champions, Regional Champions, State Runner-Up
- 2019- Boys’ Basketball Regional Champions, State Runner-Up
- 2019- Girls’ Volleyball Regional Champions
- 2015 - Boys' Football Regional Champions
- 2015 - Girls' Soccer Regional Champions
- 2014 - Boys' Baseball State Champions
- 2012 - Boys' Soccer State Champions
- 2012 - Boys' Soccer Regional Champions
- 2012 - Girls' Softball Regional Champions
- 2012 - Girls' Cross Country County, Regional, and State Champions
- 2011 - Boys' Soccer Regional Champions
- 2011 - Boys' JV Soccer County Champions
- 2010 - Boys' Soccer State Champions
- 2010 - Girls' Soccer State Champions
- 2010 - Boys' Soccer Regional Champions
- 2010 - Girls' Soccer Regional Champions
- 2010 - Boys' Outdoor Track County, Regional, and State Champions
- 2010 - Wrestling County Tournament, Regional Dual Meet, Regional Tournament, State Dual Meet and State Tournament Champions
- 2010 - Boys' Indoor Track Regional Champions and State Runner Up
- 2007 - Marching Band State Champions
- 2007 - Girls' Volleyball County, Region, and State Champions
- 2006 - Girls' Volleyball County and Regional Champions; State Runner Up
- 2005 - Girls' Tennis County Champions
- 2005 - Girls' Soccer Semifinalists
- 2005 - Girls' Indoor Track Regional Champions
- 2005 - Girls' Cross Country Regional Champions

== Notable alumni ==
- Greg Merson - 2012 World Series of Poker bracelet winner
- Cody Morris - New York Yankees starting pitcher
- Bryan Sosoo - Olympic four-man bobsleigh athlete
