= Columbia Concert Band =

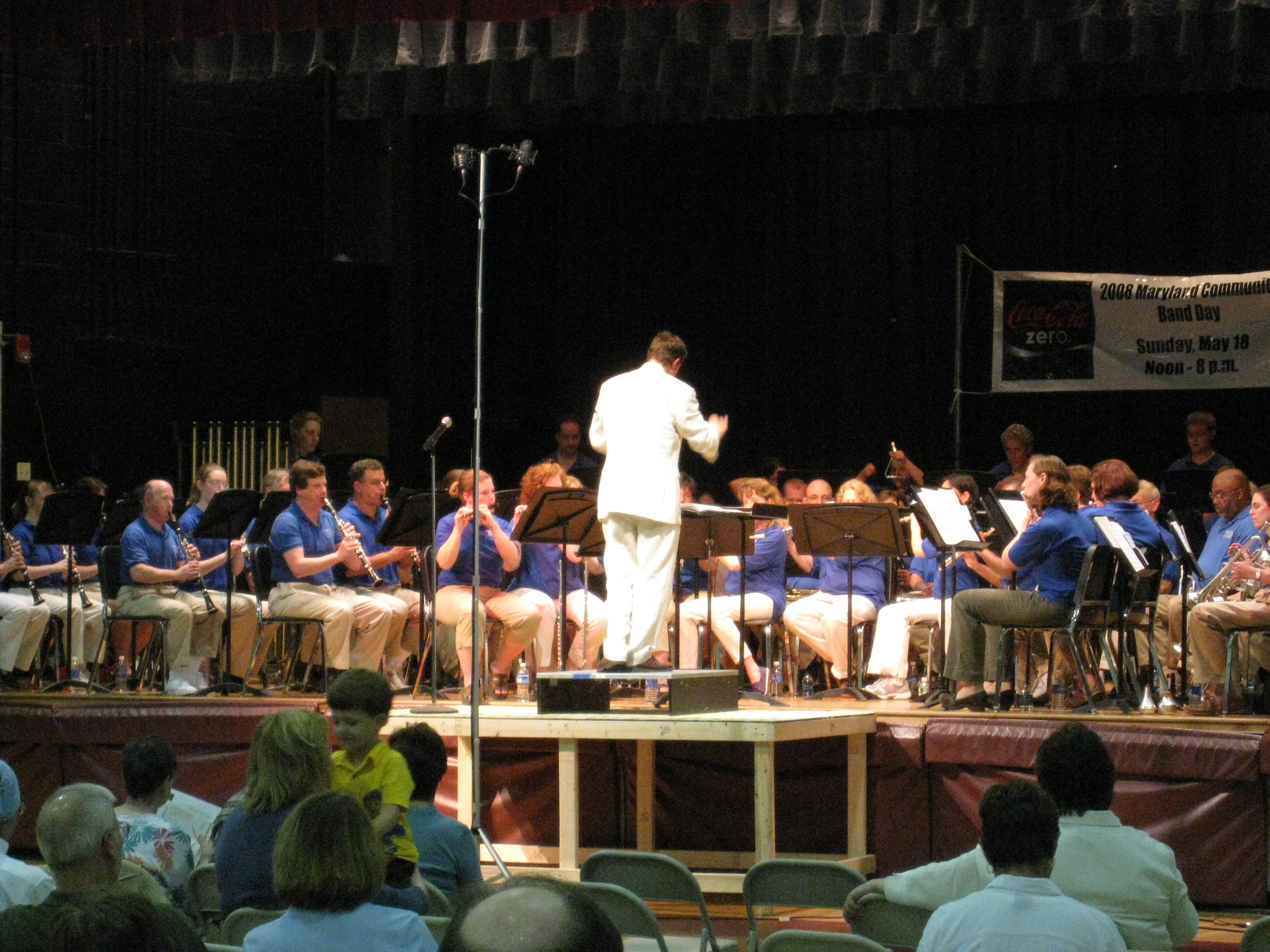
Columbia Concert Band under the direction of Michael Blackman

The Columbia Concert Band (CCB) originally began as a 25-person group called "Different Notes For Different Folks," started during the summer of 1977. It was formed to give non-professional musicians the opportunity to perform while educating and entertaining the public in Columbia, Maryland, and the surrounding communities. The band became a non-profit organization and changed its name to Columbia Community Band, playing their first concert in May 1978.

== History ==
The band was formed by Pete DiBona, Bob Thulman and Sue Waller and first rehearsed weekly at Hammond High School as a gathering of musicians who had previously played instruments during their formal schooling and professional musicians looking for another group with which to perform great music. Music teacher Ed Kerman led the band until approximately 1983 and Fred Gruenbaum was the first director.

The next director was Ron Friedman, under whom they changed their name to Columbia Concert Band and became incorporated on November 18, 1983.

In 1989, Howard County, Maryland music teacher and percussionist Robert Miller took the podium. During this time the band doubled in size, and rehearsed in a number of local schools, before settling at Hammond Middle School where Miller taught. A partnership with Howard Community College was formed.

In 2000, Peabody Institute graduate and music teacher Michael Blackman became director. Blackman had been a musician in the group since 1986.
