= Worthington's Quarters =

Worthington's Quarters, White Hall, Iris Hill
- Location within Maryland
- Interactive map of Worthington's Quarters, White Hall, Iris Hill
- 39°9′52″N 76°52′19″W
- Location: 7504 Broadcloth Way, Columbia, Maryland

History
- Built: 1755

Site notes
- Architectural style: Stone

Worthington's Quarters, White Hall, Glen Burnie, Iris Hill, is a historic plantation complex in Columbia in Howard County, Maryland, United States.

The stucco-covered brick plantation house resides on a 150-acre tract, "Wincopin Neck", surveyed for Richard and Benjamin Warfield. The land tract "Worthington's Addition" was also considered part of the estate when started as early as 1710. Richard Warfiled II (??-1755) hired out the property (called "Warfield's Contrivance") and house to Alexander Warfield and Elizabeth Ridgely in 1755, who had opened and operated a mill in 1750, downstream from the site at Guilford, Maryland. Rezin and Honor (Howard) Warfield lived onsite next. Their daughter Anne Warfield and Revolutionary War Major Richard Lawrance settled there next, calling the manor "White Hall". Dr. Charles Griffith Worthington purchased the lands and manor, passing it to his son Brice Worthington, and later his nephew Dr. William Henry Worthington (1812-1886). By 1858, five generations of the family were buried in the onsite family graveyard.

The site is located along the Middle Patuxent River, which once stood two bridges leading to Laurel. In 1936, the vacant estate was known as the Hegemen House. The original site of the complex is located on Weather Worn Way, where many private homes and apartments, as well as Dickinson Park, now stand. In 1936, it was nominated to be part of the Maryland Historic Trust, at which time it was owned by Mr. and Mrs. Thomas Ireton, though the nomination also makes reference to "[Worthington's Quarters] present owner Henry J.W. Sieling."

== See also ==
- Montpelier Mansion (Fulton, Maryland)
- Wincopia Farms
- White Hall (Ellicott City, Maryland) – Manor by the same name in Ellicott City
- White Hall, Highland Maryland – Manor by the same name in Hickory Ridge (Highland, Maryland)
- List of Howard County properties in the Maryland Historical Trust
