= Guilford Quarry Pratt Through Truss Bridge =

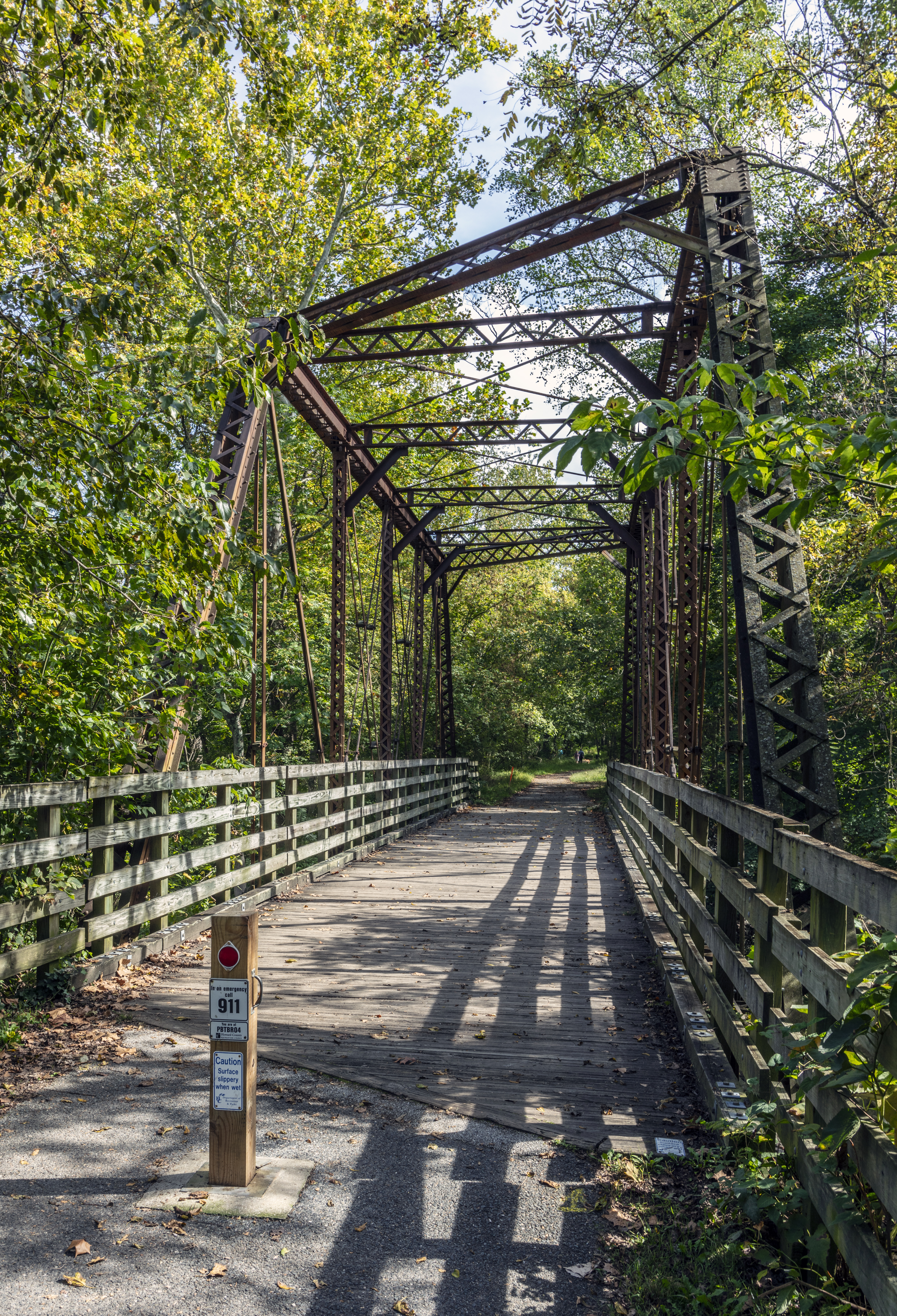
- The Guilford Pratt Through Truss Bridge in 2023
- Coordinates: 39°9′56″N 76°50′27″W
- Carries: Savage Mill Trail
- Crosses: Little Patuxent River
- Locale: Guilford, Maryland

Characteristics
- Design: Pratt Through Truss
- No. of spans: 1

History
- Designer: Thomas and Caleb Pratt
- Construction end: 1902

Statistics
- Guilford Quarry Pratt Through Truss Bridge
- U.S. National Register of Historic Places
- NRHP reference No.: 100006648
- Added to NRHP: June 2, 2021

Location
- Interactive map of Guilford Quarry Pratt Through Truss Bridge

The Guilford Quarry Pratt Through Truss Bridge is a single-span, metal truss, railroad bridge in Guilford, Maryland.

== History ==
The bridge was constructed in 1902 to extend a spur of the B&O railroad beyond Savage, Maryland upstream toward a quarry at Guilford Maryland. The town of Guilford at its peak comprised a mill, quarry, and a small village of stone structures.

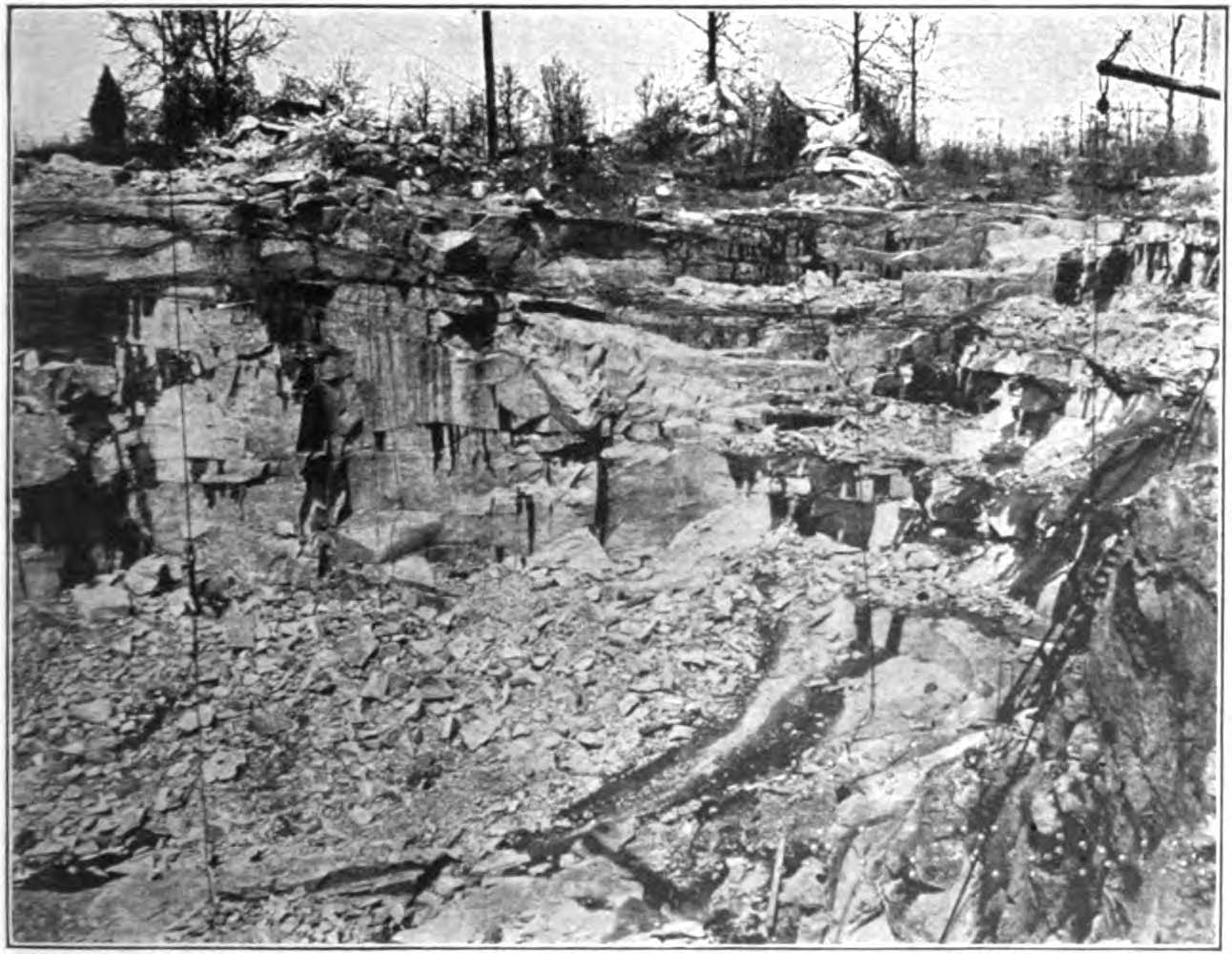
Historical photo c. 1910 of the Guilford Quarry while in operation

Guilford was noted for high quality granite for building structures. The "old Gault" Guilford quarries first started mining Guilford Quartz Monzonite in 1834. They were managed by the Guilford and Waltersville Granite Company in 1887 and later in 1889 by Matthew Gault & Son prior to the bridge installation on the Little Pautuxent river. The river was unnavigable by boat cargo, but the location along the east coast fall-line provided watermill power for mill operations and expansion of industrial applications. These included the 1744 Guilford mill expanded to 50 looms by 1881 as the (Gary Cotton Mill) under the proprietorship of James S. Gary until it burned in 1890. In 1901, the Maryland Granite Company was incorporated, purchasing 200 acres of land including the Gault quarry, Lohman and Earp Farms, and Gary Mill property. A standard-gauge railroad extension from the Savage Mill spur of the B&O railroad was started on an escarpment along the river. In addition to the bridge, a steam plant, electric plant, telephone & telegraph lines, air compressor for steel-shot cutting, 20-ton overhead crane and additional houses for employees were planned under the supervision of James J. Miller. The anticipation was to have 200 stonecutters in operation filling three railcars of rough stone daily enabled by the bridge.

The majority of the town's historic structures have since been demolished or displaced by development of the Columbia, Maryland project village of Kings Contrivance, leaving only the bridge and quarry remnants for preservation. On June 2, 2021, the Guilford Quarry Pratt Through Truss Bridge was registered on the National Register of Historic Places.

== See also ==
- List of bridges documented by the Historic American Engineering Record in Maryland
- List of Historic Civil Engineering Landmarks
- List of bridges on the National Register of Historic Places in Maryland
- List of Howard County properties in the Maryland Historical Trust
- National Register of Historic Places listings in Howard County, Maryland
