= An Assassin's Diary =

1973 book by Arthur Bremer

- First edition
- Authors: Arthur Bremer and Harding Lemay
- Language: English
- Subject: United States, Assassins
- Published: 1973 (Harper's Magazine Press)
- Publication place: United States
- Media type: Print
- ISBN: 0-06-120470-6
- OCLC: 590731
- Dewey Decimal: 976.1060924
- LC Class: E840.8.B73

An Assassin's Diary (ISBN 0-06-120470-6) is a book written by Arthur Bremer and Harding Lemay and released in 1973. It was based on part of the diary of Bremer, the would-be assassin of Alabama governor George Wallace. Bremer shot Wallace on May 15, 1972, at the Laurel Shopping Center in Laurel, Maryland, while Wallace was in the midst of his third campaign for President.

In the book, Bremer says he was not particularly opposed to Wallace's political agenda; his primary motive was to become famous, as he claimed to have also stalked President Richard Nixon.

Paul Schrader was partly inspired by Bremer's diary when he wrote the screenplay for the 1976 film Taxi Driver, which was directed by Martin Scorsese. Peter Gabriel's 1980 song "Family Snapshot," from Peter Gabriel (III) was inspired by An Assassin's Diary.

== Reviews ==
In the essay "The Art and Arts of E. Howard Hunt", Gore Vidal assesses Bremer's writing style and notes the apparent contradiction between Bremer's lucid prose and his characterization as a person with a mediocre intellect. Vidal further speculates that CIA agent E. Howard Hunt may have authored parts of Bremer's supposed diary, arguing there are similarities between Bremer's writing style and the prose found in Hunt's adventure and espionage novels, and noting Bremer's supposed diary alternates between passages of clear writing and passages of extreme misspelling and poor grammar.
