= Murder of Pam Basu =

1992 carjacking murder in Savage, Maryland

- Basu in 1980
- Location: Savage, Maryland, U.S.
- Date: September 8, 1992
- Attack type: Carjacking resulting in murder
- Deaths: 1
- Perpetrators: Bernard Eric Miller; Rodney Eugene Solomon
- No. of participants: 2

The murder of Pam Basu, resulting from a carjacking that occurred on September 8, 1992, in Savage, a community in Howard County, Maryland. Basu, a 34-year-old research chemist, was dragged to her death after her arm became caught in her car's seat belt as two men drove away in her vehicle. Her 22-month-old daughter, Sarina, survived unharmed. The killing drew nationwide attention and accelerated the passage of the Federal Anti-Car Theft Act of 1992, the first federal law making carjacking a felony offense.

== Background ==
Pamela Basu (February 17, 1958 – September 8, 1992) was an Indian American woman who moved to the United States as a child. At the time of her death, she worked as a senior research chemist at W. R. Grace and Company, a chemical firm headquartered in Columbia, Maryland. She and her husband, Biswanath "Steve" Basu, a heating and air conditioning contractor, lived in a townhouse in the Bowling Brook Farms community of Savage, in Howard County, Maryland. After difficulties conceiving, the Basus adopted Sarina from India in November 1990.

== Carjacking ==
On the morning of September 8, 1992, Pam Basu left her home in Savage to drive her daughter Sarina, then 22 months old, to her first day of preschool. Solomon and Miller had been on foot in the neighborhood after a borrowed car they were driving ran out of gas on Interstate 95 while they were traveling toward Baltimore with two other teenagers.

While at a stop sign near her home, the two men struck her repeatedly and forced Basu out of her car, a 1990 BMW. As the car began to move, Basu reached back inside in an attempt to pull her daughter from the rear seat. Her arm became entangled in the seat belt on the driver's side as the car sped away, dragging her for approximately 1.7 miles. Her body struck a barbed-wire fence before she came to rest at the fenced entrance to Wincopia Farms;. She died shortly after of her injuries at the age of 34.

Witnesses reported that Miller tossed the child, still in a child safety seat, onto the roadside after the car had traveled a short distance. Sarina was rescued by a passing motorist and was physically unharmed.

Biswanath Basu had videotaped his wife and his daughter before they left for school that morning. The prosecutors in the criminal case stated that the two perpetrators could be seen in the background of this video as they roamed the neighborhood looking for a car to steal after another stolen car they were driving had run out of gas.

== Investigation and arrest ==
Basu's carjacking and murder included two attempted carjackings prior to Solomon and Miller encountering Basu, all occurring within a tight geographic radius in southern Howard County over a period of fifteen to twenty-five minutes. Witnesses in the neighborhood observed the two men approaching homes and vehicles in the period immediately before the attack and made positive identifications of both men at trial.

The two were arrested shortly after 10 a.m. about six miles from the abduction scene after an officer spotted the stolen BMW. One suspect was caught immediately, and a state police helicopter was called to help find the other. Both men were charged with murder and other charges.

== Trials ==
The central dispute at trial was which of the two men had been driving Basu's car.

=== Rodney Eugene Solomon ===
Rodney Eugene Solomon (December 22, 1965 – August 4, 2018) was 26 years old at the time of the crime. After serving nearly five years in prison for robbery, jailhouse rioting, and possession of contraband, he was released in April 1991, seventeen months before Basu's death. He was arrested three times during those seventeen months and was awaiting trial on two separate drug distribution charges at the time of the carjacking.

Solomon's defense lawyers argued that Miller had been the driver, relying in part on taped interviews in which Miller gave conflicting accounts: initially saying Solomon drove, then saying they occupied the driver's seat together, and two days later telling police he was the sole driver. Prosecutors presented fingerprints found on the driver's side of the car as evidence that Solomon had been behind the wheel. A Baltimore County jury of nine women and three men convicted Solomon of first-degree murder. The prosecution sought a death sentence, but the jury recommended life without parole instead. During the penalty phase, a clinical psychologist testified that testing showed Solomon had brain damage and the emotional development of a ten-year-old. Solomon died at UPMC Western Maryland on August 4, 2018, at the age of 52.

=== Bernard Eric Miller ===
Bernard Eric Miller (born November 7, 1975) was 16 years old at the time of the crime. Miller's defense attorney conceded that Miller had accompanied Solomon during the crime but argued that he was an "innocent presence" who had not participated in the violence against Basu. At trial, prosecutors presented testimony from witnesses who said they saw a man and a youth beat Basu and force her from the car, and from a motorist who watched as someone got out of the passenger side of the BMW, removed Sarina's car seat, and threw the child into the road.

Miller was convicted of first-degree murder and several other charges; because he was a minor at the time of the offense, he was ineligible for the death penalty under Maryland law. He was sentenced to life in prison plus ten years with the possibility of parole. As of August 2021, he remains in prison, incarcerated at Maryland Correctional Institution - Hagerstown.

== Legislative impact ==
In 1992, in the aftermath of a spate of violent carjackings (including the Basu case), Congress passed the Federal Anti-Car Theft Act of 1992 (FACTA), the first federal carjacking law, making it a federal crime (punishable by 15 years to life imprisonment) to use a firearm to steal "through force or violence or intimidation" a motor vehicle that had been shipped through interstate commerce. The 1992 Act, codified at 18 U.S.C. § 2119, took effect on October 25, 1992.

In addition, several states, including Maryland, have passed tougher carjacking laws because of the Basu attack, which drew national attention when it occurred.

== Media ==
Fatal Destiny: The Carjacking Murder of Dr. Pam Basu, by James H. Lilley, was published on March 4, 2012. Lilley is a retired Howard County police sergeant, who had investigated the Basu case some twenty years prior to writing his book.

Fatal Destiny was named Book of the Year in 2013 by Police-Writers.com.

== See also ==
- Crime in Maryland
- Carjacking
- List of kidnappings
- Wincopia Farms
