= Cattail Creek Quarry =

- Location within Maryland
- 39°18′22″N 77°03′28″W
- Location: Lisbon, Maryland

History
- Built: Early 19th century

Site notes
- Area: Daisy

Cattail Creek Quarry is a historic industrial quarry in Lisbon, Howard County, Maryland. Near modern Glenwood, Woodbine and Daisy, Maryland at 2425 Daisy Road.

The location is archeologically significant as the northernmost (upstream) location of prehistoric lithographs from a culture of hunters that ranged 170 miles South to the Chesapeake.

The quarry was hand mined by African American laborers. Local historian Silas Craft wrote of Channing William Dorsey finding the highest pay for African Americans in the county working the quarry and sawmill of Cattail (and Guilford) at the turn of the century.

A residential home was built in 1977 adjacent to the quarry. The quarry was allowed to fill with water shortly afterward. A historic survey was conducted in 1979, but the county records have been removed.

== See also ==
- List of Howard County properties in the Maryland Historical Trust
- West Friendship, Maryland
