= Bryan Sosoo =

American bobsledder (born 1996)

Bryan Sosoo OLY
Personal information
- Born: December 2, 1996 (age 29) Accra, Ghana
- Home town: Laurel, Maryland, U.S.

Sport
- Country: United States
- Sport: Bobsleigh
- Event: Four-man

Bryan Sosoo (born December 2, 1996) is a Ghanaian-born American bobsledder. He represented the United States at the 2026 Winter Olympics.

== Early life and education ==
Sosoo was born in Ghana to Barbara and Martin Sosoo and raised in Laurel, Maryland. He attended Reservoir High School where he was the Maryland state champ in the 55-meter dash and triple jump. He then attended Monmouth University, where he was a track and field athlete. He was a three-time Metro Atlantic Athletic Conference (MAAC) indoor champion in the 60-meter dash, and set a Monmouth school-record time of 6.71 seconds in 2016.

== Career ==
After graduating college, he continued his track and field career, competing internationally for Ghana until 2024, when he made the switch to bobsled and joined the U.S. national team. In January 2026, he was selected to represent the United States at the 2026 Winter Olympics. He made the Olympic team only 18 months after beginning his bobsledding career.
