= Family Snapshot =

Song by Peter Gabriel

from the album Peter Gabriel (Melt)
- Released: 30 May 1980
- Recorded: 1978–1979
- Genre: Art rock; progressive pop; progressive rock
- Length: 4:28
- Label: Charisma; Geffen
- Songwriter: Peter Gabriel
- Producer: Steve Lillywhite

"Family Snapshot" is a song written and performed by the English rock musician Peter Gabriel. An early iteration of the song was performed live in 1978, with initial tracking occurring that same year. The song appeared on his third eponymous studio album. Portions of "Family Snapshot" were reworked for the track "Close Up", which was included on Gabriel's 1985 Birdy soundtrack album. Lyrically, the song relates to an assassin recounting their plans and mindset in carrying out an assassination.

== Background ==
"Family Snapshot" was inspired by the book An Assassin's Diary, published in 1973 and written by Arthur Bremer, who, on May 15, 1972, attempted to assassinate George Wallace, a Democratic Party politician who supported racial segregation. Gabriel talked about the book in an interview with Sounds magazine:

An Assassin's Diary was a really nasty book, but you do get a sense of the person who is writing it. Bremer was obsessed with the idea of fame. He was aware of the news broadcasts all over the world and was trying to time the assassination to hit the early evening news in the States and the late night in Europe to get maximum coverage.

Gabriel stated in the introduction to the song during his concert at the Paramount Theatre, Seattle in 1983 that the song is "partly taken from the writings of Arthur Bremer and The Diary of an Assassin and mixed with a few images of Dallas twenty years ago", referring to the Assassination of John F. Kennedy.

== Composition ==
The song starts off as a slow, understated piece, where the killer goes through his plan, becoming more intense as the target unwittingly comes closer to the assassin. By the third section of the song, guitar chords from Dave Gregory of XTC are introduced; the lyrics in this section detail the assassin scouting the area for their target. This section also includes a saxophone solo played by Dick Morrissey. At the song's climax, which features full instrumentation, the assassin rationalises that their decision to carry out the murder will provide them with notoriety. Finally, the song transitions back to a quiet, mournful climax as the shooter, having just shot his target, remembers his childhood loneliness and desire for attention. Gabriel stated in a June 1980 interview with Sounds that the assassin's flashback at the end of the song was meant to express the notion that "patterns of behavior begun in childhood do carry through." This final section is accompanied by sparse instrumentation consisting of a fretless bass played by John Giblin and minimal keyboards.

Larry Fast recalled that the song's second half derived from an instrumental that was developed during soundchecks from Gabriel's tour promoting his second solo album. He said that the composition did not "firm up" until the recording sessions for Gabriel's third solo album began. Jerry Marotta, who played drums on the song, agreed with this assessment, saying that "the sections were kind of there, but we didn't know where to put them." The working title was "FMR", according to early tour setlists. Early tracking was conducted on 28 August 1978 at Trident Studios with members of Gabriel's touring band. The final recording features Gabriel's first use of the Yamaha CP-70 electric grand piano. Some melodic ideas were recycled from an unreleased song titled "Why Don't We", which Gabriel played on his 1977 concert tour.

Gabriel recalled that Hugh Padgham and Fast assisted with the processing of a Prophet synthesizer. "There was a sound I used to like on 'Family Snapshot' which was a small variation on a Prophet noise. It was OK on its own, but it was magical with the processing. And then Hugh Padgham, at that time, made some nice additional stereo imaging and delays, so it was a beautiful swirl sound. In the mix you don't hear it as much, but it's the sort of G minor where the band comes in." When Gabriel's third self-titled album was being sequenced, one of the assistant engineers accidentally cut off the first minute of "Family Snapshot", so Padgham was required to mix the part back in.

== Critical reception ==
In his review for Gabriel's 1980 self-titled album, Hugh Fielder of Sounds thought that "Family Snapshot" was a "cool but intimate profile of an assassin at work" and said that the song's tension modulates with "deft control". Graeme Thomson of Uncut characterised the song as a "beautiful three-part epic about an assassin’s craving for notoriety, hot-housed by childhood alienation." Dave Marsh of Rolling Stone was more critical of "Family Snapshot", saying that the song was "off the mark because it lapses into the cheapest sort of Freudianism."

== Personnel ==
- Peter Gabriel – vocals; piano
- David Rhodes – guitar
- Jerry Marotta – drums
- Larry Fast – synthesizer
- Phil Collins – snare drum
- John Giblin – bass
- Dave Gregory – guitar
- Dick Morrissey – saxophone
