= Victor Myers Farmhouse =

- Location within Maryland
- 39°08′40″N 76°51′23″W
- Location: Laurel, Maryland

History
- Built: Early 19th century

Site notes
- Area: Laurel
- Architectural style: Wood Frame

The Victor Myers Farm is a historic farm located in North Laurel, Howard County, Maryland.

The Victor Myers Farm is a historic farm in North Laurel on an 80 acre parcel built in the early 19th century. In 1995, the county pursued demolishing the home to build the combination Gorman Crossing Elementary School and Murray Hill Middle School. The house has been restored and stands presently on a reduced parcel adjacent to the schools.

== See also ==
- Wincopia Farms
