= Laurel Mall (Maryland) =

Former shopping mall in Maryland, US

Laurel Centre Mall
- Location: Laurel, Maryland, U.S.
- Coordinates: 39°5′38.21″N 76°51′27.22″W
- Address: 14828 Baltimore Ave, Laurel, MD 20707
- Opened: October 11, 1979
- Closed: May 1, 2012
- Demolished: August 14, 2012
- Developer: Shopco inc.
- Num. of stores: 120
- Num. of anchor tenants: 3
- Floors: 2

Laurel Mall was a shopping mall located on the west side of U.S. Route 1 in Laurel, Maryland. The mall opened on October 11, 1979 and connected two pre-existing structures – the freestanding Montgomery Ward on its south side and Laurel Shopping Center to the north. The mall closed permanently on May 1, 2012.

== History ==
The Laurel Centre Mall was developed by Shopco Inc. and opened in 1979 with about 60 to 70 of its 120 store spaces occupied. The mall included two anchor stores, Montgomery Ward and JCPenney, with a third anchor, Hecht's, added in 1981. The 167,000-square-foot (15,500 m^{2}) Montgomery Ward store opened for business on April 16, 1969, as a stand-alone business. Montgomery Ward's entered a long-term lease for a $1.60/sf, which was to be offset by higher rates charged to satellite shops drawing on the anchor. It would be ten years until the 83,000-square-foot (7,700 m^{2}) JCPenney store opened in 1979, with the 265,000-square-foot (24,600 m^{2}) Laurel Centre expansion, creating a traditional enclosed mall. The Hecht Company moved its store from its previous location in the Laurel Shopping Center. In 1991, the 662,000-square-foot (61,500 m^{2}) mall received a $2 million face lift and update. Though it was small in comparison with most malls today, Laurel Mall had two levels and, when it opened, had modern innovations such as a slowly rotating two-story island in the middle of a fountain known as the "Carousel" with room for seven kiosks on the bottom and a stage on top. Time Out Tunnel arcade had a location near the main entrance on the second level. Other features at the mall were a glass-sided walkway over a roadway and parking lot and an enclosed bridge between JCPenney and Woolworth's at the Laurel Shopping Center. The food court "Inner Circle", later changed to "Circle Eatery", was located at the mall's south end. Here the mall split into a one level mezzanine section to accommodate Montgomery Ward, which had no second floor. Connecting it all were Maryland's shortest escalators at the time, one rising to a height of only 13 steps. A double-door elevator transported customers between the three levels and to a management office in the basement.

On November 1, 1980, Congresswoman Gladys Noon Spellman collapsed at a campaign appearance at the Laurel Mall after suffering an incapacitating heart attack. She represented the 5th congressional district of Maryland from January 3, 1975, to January 3, 1981.

By the 2000s, the Mall had been in decline. In 2001, anchor store Montgomery Ward went out of business, and JC Penney vacated the mall in 2002. Around the same time, the expansion and renovation of the nearby Mall in Columbia added restaurants and movie theaters to its existing tenants. Big-box stores at U.S. Route 1 and Maryland Route 198 opened and expanded offerings over the decade. As a result, business at the Laurel mall dwindled. A Burlington Coat Factory occupied most of the former Montgomery Ward space, and Macy's replaced Hecht's in 2006. On two occasions, sections of the aging parking decks had crumbled and fallen onto the parking lots below, resulting in their closure.

In January 2012, Macy's announced it would close five underperforming stores with final clearance sales beginning January 8, and would run through early spring, including the Laurel Mall location, which left Burlington Coat Factory its last remaining anchor store. During this phase, the mall advertised its transformation with cryptic messages printed across some of the shuttered store fronts, such as "Don't judge a book by its cover", "Looks can be deceiving", "Beauty is more than skin deep", "If nothing ever changed, there'd be no butterflies", and "It's what's inside that counts".

== Redevelopment ==
In 1991, the mall removed its wood-finished floors and store fascias, and updated with modern pastel colored Formica panels. The floor was redone with a cream colored marble, and the revolving center shops were replaced with a blue painted steel stairway and security desk.

In 2006, the mall fell into receivership and was sold to Somera Capital Management, which owns and operates many malls across the nation, for $31 million. Somera hired General Growth Properties to redevelop the space. Renovation plans were unveiled to the public on January 30, 2007, at Laurel City Hall. The plans included a new 80,000-square-foot (7,400 m^{2}) anchor, a 16-screen Regal Theaters with stadium seating, a two-story bookstore, a new food court, restaurants with sidewalk dining (including Mimi's Cafe), new national and regional shops, a new parking deck, a redesigned exterior of bricks and stones, and a new interior. The redesigned mall was to be renamed "Laurel Commons," and was to have been accompanied by luxury apartments and a grocery store on the mall property. The first phase of the project was scheduled to begin construction in 2009. General Growth Properties filed bankruptcy protection, and construction never started, to the dismay of the City Council and Mayor, who threatened to withdraw the $16 million tax break.

Greenberg Gibbons Commercial (GGC) took partial ownership and began managing the mall on March 1, 2011. GGC also unveiled new plans for the redevelopment of the mall, to include demolition of most of the existing mall with the exception of Macy's and the rear parking structure. The new plans called for an open air multi-use shopping center which would include a movie theater, health club, restaurants, and a residential area. The mall would also receive a new name, "Laurel Town Center." Construction was scheduled to begin in approximately 18 months from the time that the new plans were announced in March 2011.

The mall closed on May 1, 2012. Burlington Coat Factory remained open, pending final agreements regarding redevelopment of the site. Additionally, a branch of the United States Post Office remained open, although the Postal Service had already targeted the Laurel Main Branch for closure.

On August 14, 2012, the city of Laurel hosted a groundbreaking ceremony to begin destruction of the current mall. By October 12, 2012, all of the parking garage on the Rt 1 side of the mall had been demolished, and interior demolition of the mall had begun. The Burlington Coat Factory (former Montgomery Ward) building was demolished in July 2013; it was the only remaining portion of the former mall.

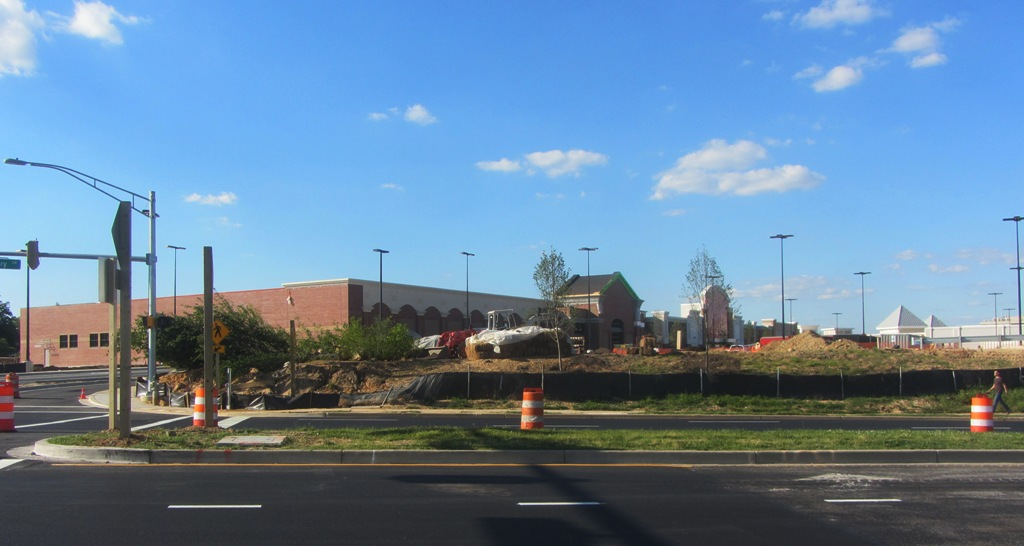
Towne Centre at Laurel under construction in 2014

The new center, named Towne Centre at Laurel, includes a relocation of Burlington Coat Factory, along with new stores and restaurants, including Harris Teeter, Sports Authority (closed 2016), Party City, Panera Bread, Moe's Southwest Grill, Buffalo Wild Wings, Old Navy, Outback Steakhouse, and Regal Cinemas. Construction was completed, and the Towne Centre at Laurel opened in 2014.
