= Silver Lake (Michigan) =

Lake in the state of Michigan, United States

Silver Lake is the name of several lakes in the U.S. state of Michigan:

Name	GNIS ID	County	State	Coord	Elevation
Green Oak Lake	627322	Livingston County	MI	42°27′58″N 83°43′23″W	876 feet (267 m)
Hamburg Lake	627671	Livingston County	MI	42°26′13″N 83°47′46″W	886 feet (270 m)
Hart Lake	627876	Muskegon County	MI	43°23′52″N 86°09′9″W	676 feet (206 m)
Little Silver Lake	630768	Osceola County	MI	44°0′24″N 85°24′26″W	1,214 feet (370 m)
Little Silver Lake	630767	Clare County	MI	43°55′14″N 84°58′14″W	1,070 feet (330 m)
Magician Lake	631525	Cass County	MI	42°4′3″N 86°09′59″W	761 feet (232 m)
Maple Lake	1620703	Lake County	MI	44°9′17″N 85°59′49″W	745 feet (227 m)
Shonenya Lake	1621593	Lake County	MI	43°51′30″N 85°57′53″W	820 feet (250 m)
Silver Fox Lake	2630437	Livingston County	MI	42°28′39″N 83°43′22″W	879 feet (268 m)
Silver Lake	637943	Oakland County	MI	42°40′42″N 83°20′29″W	948 feet (289 m)
Silver Lake	1621616	Alger County	MI	46°24′5″N 87°01′45″W	915 feet (279 m)
Silver Lake	637956	Branch County	MI	41°46′42″N 84°59′51″W	991 feet (302 m)
Silver Lake	637955	Livingston County	MI	42°37′43″N 83°43′9″W	951 feet (290 m)
Silver Lake	637944	Kent County	MI	43°5′29″N 85°29′27″W	853 feet (260 m)
Silver Lake	637945	Clare County	MI	43°55′8″N 84°57′56″W	1,073 feet (327 m)
Silver Lake	637946	Osceola County	MI	44°0′19″N 85°24′2″W	1,214 feet (370 m)
Silver Lake	637947	Ogemaw County	MI	44°14′4″N 84°02′54″W	801 feet (244 m)
Silver Lake	637949	Cheboygan County	MI	45°12′17″N 84°19′1″W	830 feet (250 m)
Silver Lake	637938	Van Buren County	MI	42°23′21″N 86°03′36″W	676 feet (206 m)
Silver Lake	637952	Dickinson County	MI	46°12′14″N 88°01′7″W	1,394 feet (425 m)
Silver Lake	637950	Cheboygan County	MI	45°16′11″N 84°37′59″W	823 feet (251 m)
Silver Lake	1621615	Mackinac County	MI	45°53′12″N 84°49′13″W	614 feet (187 m)
Silver Lake	637958	Oceana County	MI	43°40′5″N 86°30′10″W	584 feet (178 m)
Silver Lake	626122	Iron County	MI	46°9′5″N 88°49′50″W	1,631 feet (497 m)
Silver Lake	637937	Washtenaw County	MI	42°10′54″N 83°58′9″W	951 feet (290 m)
Silver Lake	637951	Cheboygan County	MI	45°26′3″N 84°29′4″W	686 feet (209 m)
Silver Lake	637942	Allegan County	MI	42°38′58″N 86°09′54″W	581 feet (177 m)
Silver Lake	637953	Marquette County	MI	46°20′26″N 87°20′6″W	1,112 feet (339 m)
Silver Lake	637936	Lenawee County	MI	42°2′38″N 84°18′26″W	1,007 feet (307 m)
Silver Lake	637939	Washtenaw County	MI	42°25′9″N 83°57′38″W	873 feet (266 m)
Silver Lake	637948	Grand Traverse County	MI	44°41′33″N 85°41′2″W	860 feet (260 m)
Silver Lake	637954	Schoolcraft County	MI	46°27′41″N 86°15′10″W	876 feet (267 m)
Silver Lake	637940	Barry County	MI	42°27′30″N 85°32′25″W	883 feet (269 m)
Silver Lake	637941	Allegan County	MI	42°29′21″N 85°56′2″W	696 feet (212 m)
Silver Lead Mine Lake	637964	Marquette County	MI	46°40′12″N 87°51′0″W	1,578 feet (481 m)
Silver Mine Lakes	637965	Marquette County	MI	46°36′11″N 87°39′11″W	1,506 feet (459 m)
Silvers Lake	637969	Calhoun County	MI	42°21′29″N 84°45′28″W	919 feet (280 m)
Upper Silver Lake	1618815	Oceana County	MI	43°40′43″N 86°29′3″W	614 feet (187 m)
Upper Silver Lake	1615414	Oakland County	MI	42°40′38″N 83°19′39″W	948 feet (289 m)

*Note on lakes that span more than one county: The county column only shows the first county returned by GNIS in this column.

== See also ==
- Silver Lake, a former settlement in Washtenaw County
