= Maryland Correctional Institution - Hagerstown =

Correctional institution in Hagerstown, Maryland, US

Coordinates: 39°33′40″N 77°43′29″W

- Interactive map of Maryland Correctional Institution - Hagerstown
- Location: 18601 Roxbury Road Hagerstown, Maryland
- Status: open
- Security class: medium
- Capacity: 2179
- Opened: 1942
- Managed by: Maryland Department of Public Safety and Correctional Services

The Maryland Correctional Institution - Hagerstown is a medium-security state prison for men located in Hagerstown, Washington County, Maryland. First opened in 1942 as the Maryland State Penal Farm, it was expanded and assumed its current name in 1964. It has a maximum capacity of 2,179 inmates.

== Notable immates ==
- Bernard Eric Miller, murderer
