= Moundland =

- Location within Maryland
- 39°16′00″N 76°50′00″W
- Location: 8814 Guilford Road Columbia, Maryland

History
- Built: 1846

Site notes
- Architectural style: Stone

Moundland was a historic plantation home located between Simpsonville and Guilford, Howard County, Maryland, now part of the Columbia land development.

The stone manor home Moundland was built by Charles R. Stewart in 1846 for his daughter and her husband Charles Griffith Worthington Jr., who served on the first panel of Howard County Commissioners. The English imported locks on the house were dated to 1830. The 22 inch thick walls were quarried onsite and the original floors remained intact. The house neighbored Granite Park manor home, which was also built by Stewart.

In 1966, 245 acres of property surrounding the 10 acre Moundland site were purchased by the Howard Research and Development for the creation of the Rouse Company planned community project called Columbia. The Moundland property was later purchased by South Columbia Baptist Church, which, in 1991, demolished Moundland to build a new church facility.

== See also ==
- List of Howard County properties in the Maryland Historical Trust
