= Hammond High School (Maryland) =

Public high school in Columbia, Maryland, U.S.

Coordinates: 39.1667°N 76.8603°W

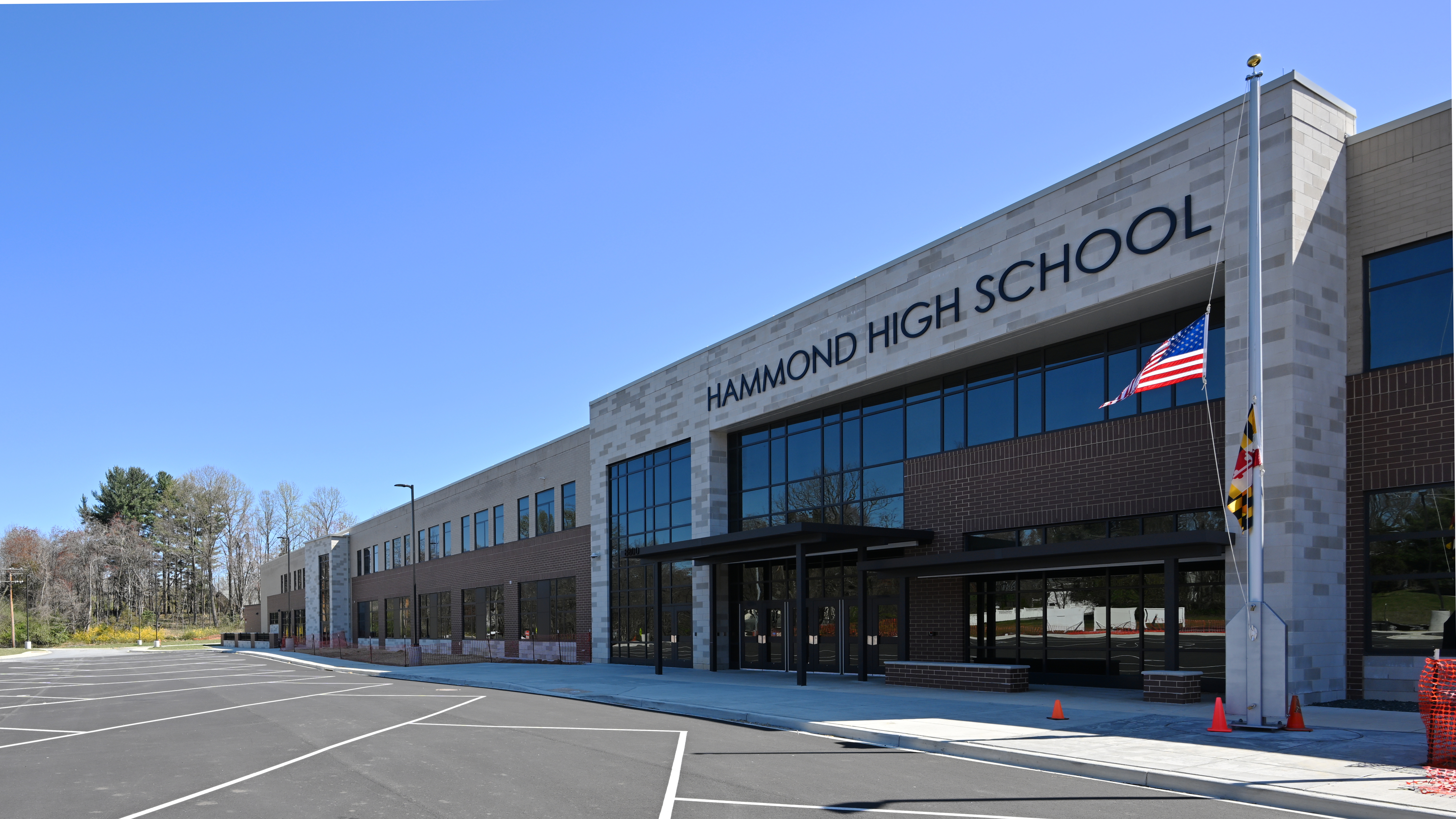

Location
- 8800 Guilford Road; Columbia, MD 21046; United States

Information
- Type: public high school
- Motto: "Where People Are Important"
- Established: 1976
- School district: Howard County Public Schools
- Principal: Raymona Reid
- Grades: 9–12
- Enrollment: 1,301
- Colors: Maroon and gold
- Mascot: Golden Bear
- Website: hahs.hcpss.org

Hammond High School, established in 1977, is a public high school located in Columbia, Maryland, United States. It is part of the Howard County Public School System. It is located near the Kings Contrivance Village Center, south of Maryland Route 32, east of U.S. 29, and west of I-95.

== Origins and history ==
Howard County experienced rapid population growth during the 1960s, and by the early 1970s schools in the southern part of the county were seriously overcrowded. In September 1971 Hammond Elementary-Middle School opened in Hammond Village, a large residential development near Gorman Road. The construction of a new high school that would serve the area was also a top priority for the County Board of Education, and the planned school was frequently referred to as the "Hammond Area High School." (Hammond Village derives its name from Hammond Branch, a tributary of the Little Patuxent River that flows through it. The name Hammond Branch, in turn, dates back at least to 1725). Nevertheless, because of projected future development, the location chosen in 1973 for the high school was not in Hammond Village, but was on Guilford Road in the then planned Village of Kings Contrivance.

Hammond High School was built concurrently with and with the same floor plan as Centennial High School. During the 1976–77 school year, the Hammond High School building served as the temporary home of Howard High School, whose building was being renovated. The first class of Hammond High School entered in September 1977. The school has sometimes been referred to as "The Zoo on 32".

Hammond's original school colors were brown, gold and white. These colors were changed to maroon and gold in 2002. Hammond began renovation in April 2020, and construction was completed in December 2023.

== Students ==
Hammond High School has an official capacity of 1,220 students (not including additional capacity provided by four portable classrooms as of 2010). The student population at Hammond High School has grown moderately over the past 18 years.

Student population
1993	1994	1995	1996	1997	1998	1999	2000	2001	2002	2003	2004	2005	2006	2007	2008	2009	2010	2011	2012	2020
988	1,016	1,026	1,096	978	1,048	1,134	1,161	1,275	1,322	1,282	1,316	1,341	1,305	1,309		1,342			1,319	1,316

The racial makeup of the population during the 2017–2018 school year was 25.8% White, 41.8% Black or African American, 10.6% Asian, 15.1% Hispanic or Latino, 0.2% Native American, 0.2% Native Hawaiian or Pacific Islander, and 6.2% two or more races.

The ethnicity demographics during the FY20 school year were ≤5.0% American Indian/Alaskan, 10.5% Asian, 40.6% Black or African American, ≤5.0% Hawaiian/Pacific Islander, 16.7% Hispanic/Latino, 24.7% White, and 7.1% two or more races.

== Sports ==
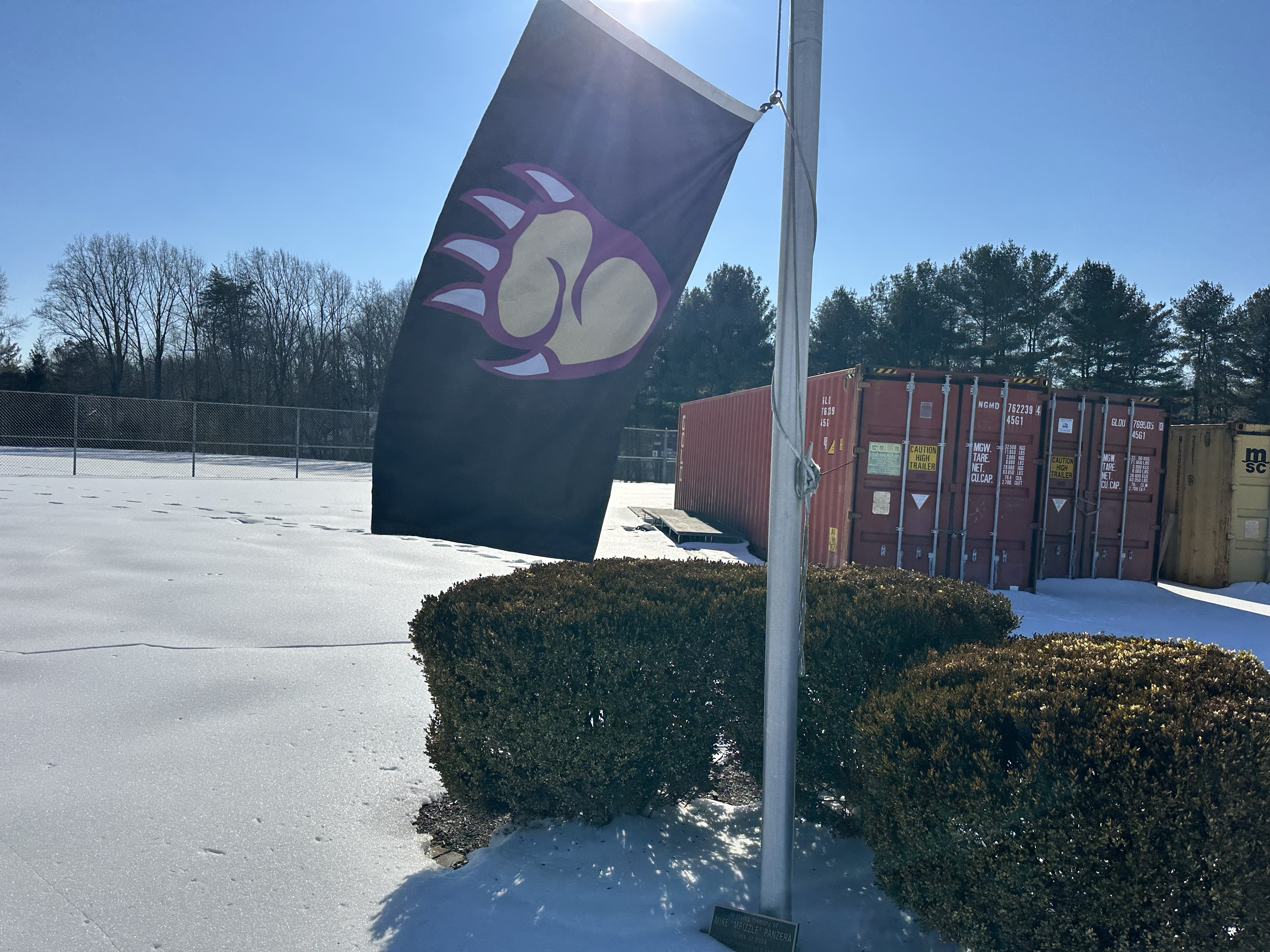
The school flag, lowered after hours (February 2026)

=== State championships ===
Hammond High School won nine state championships for girls' sports and six for boys' sports.

SPORT	YEAR
Boys' basketball	1983
Boys' soccer	2006
Wrestling	1996, 1998, 2005, 2006
Girls' basketball	1992, 1994, 1995, 2024
Girls' indoor track 2A-1A	1994
Girls' soccer	1989, 1991, 1998
Girls' softball	2007
•= denotes co-champions Source: MPSSAA Official Tournament Records
