= Laurel Shopping Center =

Shopping complex in Laurel, Maryland

Coordinates: 39°5′46″N 76°51′16″W

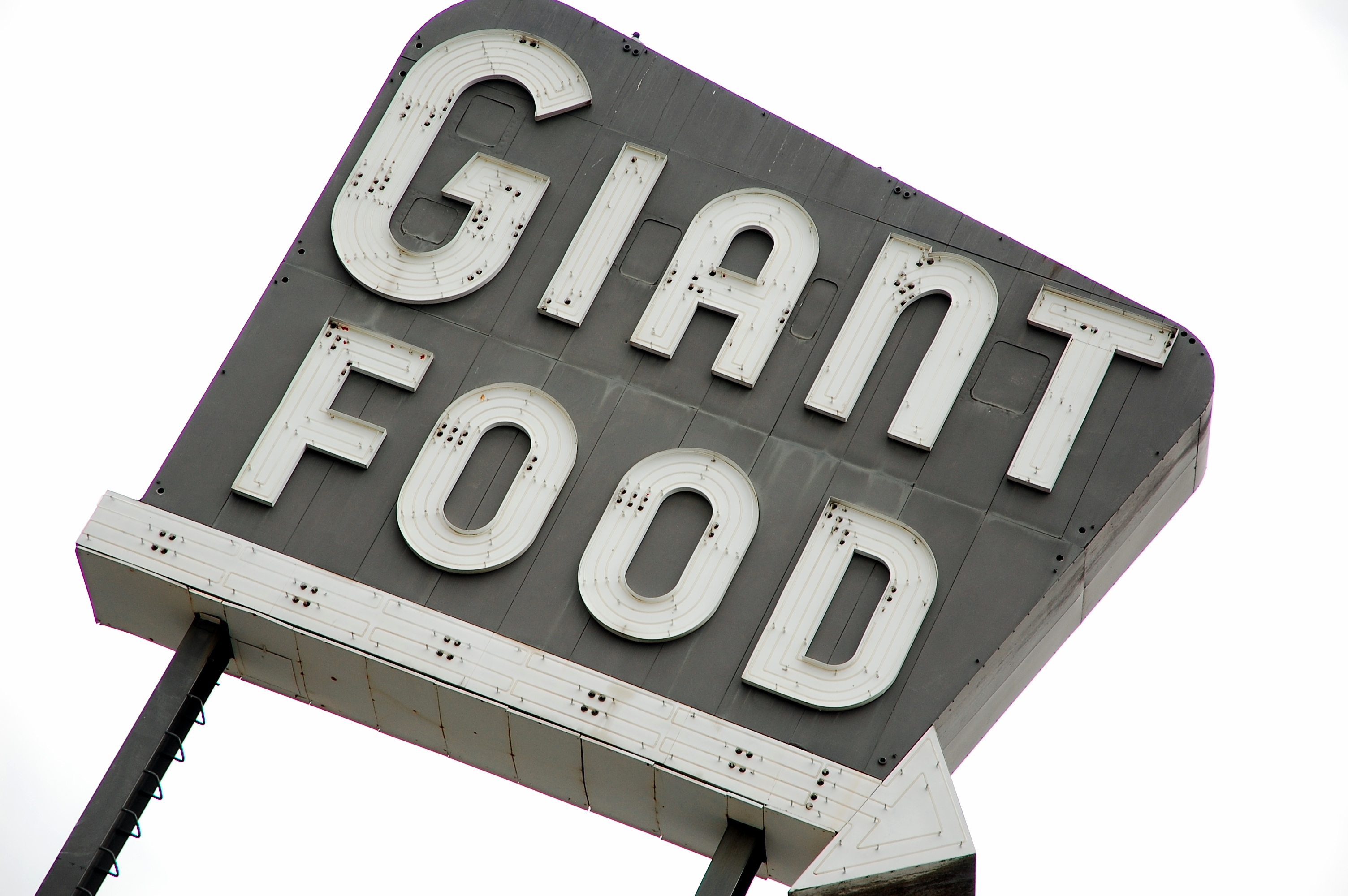
- Location: Laurel, Maryland, United States
- Opened: 1956
- Developer: Berman Enterprises LP
- Manager: Federal Realty Investment Trust
- Owner: Federal Realty Investment Trust
- Floors: 1
- Website: laurelshoppingcenter.com

Laurel Shopping Center is an open-air shopping complex located in Laurel, Maryland, on U.S. Route 1 just south of Maryland Route 198, and is positioned next to the Towne Centre at Laurel.

The shopping center is widely known as the site of the 1972 near-fatal attempted assassination on Alabama Governor George Wallace during his campaign for the U.S. presidency.

== History ==
The $2 million shopping center on 15 acres (61,000 m^{2}) was developed by Berman Enterprises LP and opened on November 14, 1956, with 30 stores. The developers also developed the Ingleside Shopping Center near Baltimore, Maryland.

On April 24, 1964, the Hecht Company opened an 83,714-square-foot (7,777.3 m^{2}) store, its sixth location in the Washington, D.C., area, at the center. A notable feature of the store at its opening was the French Provincial beauty salon and snack bar. The store closed and moved to adjacent Laurel Mall in 1981.

Subsequent to the May 15, 1972, attempt on George Wallace's life, Wallace was left paralyzed from the waist down. A bank branch remains near the location of the assassination attempt – Equitable Trust at the time and currently Bank of America.

Three days before the September 11 attacks, hijacker Mohamed Atta sent $5,000 to Mustafa Ahmad via a wire transfer he initiated at the Giant Food store located in the shopping center.

== Current ==
Anchor stores include Giant Food, CVS Pharmacy, Harbor Freight Tools, Marshalls department store, and LA Fitness. The Laurel Shopping Center is adjacent to the Towne Centre at Laurel, which replaced Laurel Mall in 2014.
