= Wincopia Farms =

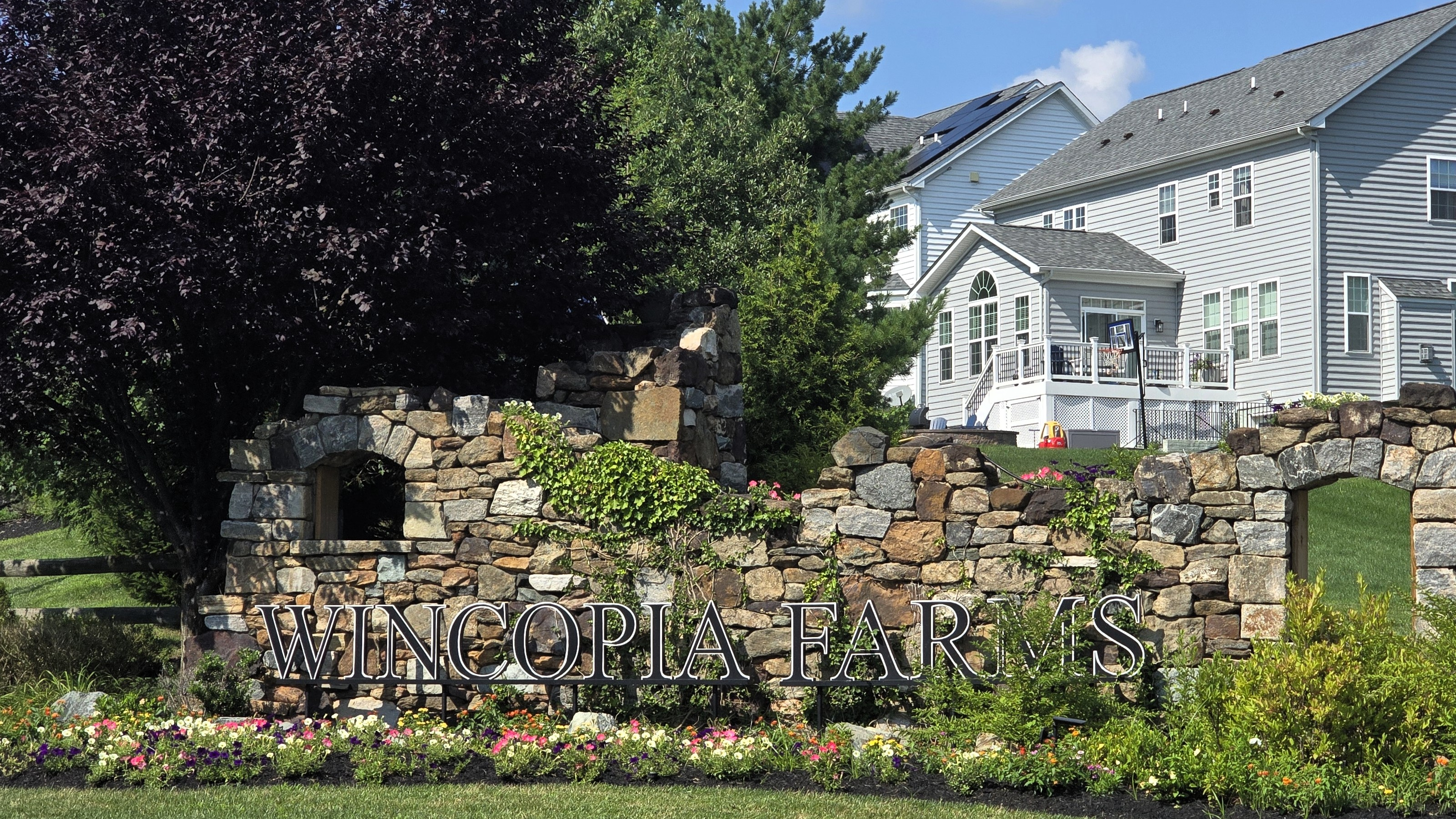
- Sign at the entrance to Wincopia Farms housing development in 2026

- Location within Maryland
- Interactive map of Wincopia Farms
- 39°08′48″N 76°50′50″W
- Location: North Laurel, Maryland

Site notes
- Governing body: Private

Wincopia Farms was a historic farm located at North Laurel, Howard County, Maryland, United States.

Wincopia Farms was one of three large farms in the area. Overlook Farm and Fairlands remain well preserved, but the 124 acre Wincopia Farms was purchased for development. The Hearn family operated it until 2010. While some sources claim the Hearn family owned the farm for over 200 years, the title history shows the family purchased the farm in 1880. They raised poinsettias with customers that included the White House and Kennedy Center.

On September 8, 1992, a man and a teenager attempted a series of failed carjackings starting at the southbound I-95 rest stop on Wincopin property leased by the Hearn Family through the Bolling Brook subdivisions. The men carjacked the vehicle of Dr. Pam Basu and her 22-month-old daughter at a stop at Horsham and Knights Bridge Road. Basu attempted to retrieve her daughter, and was dragged to death along Gorman Road, with the carjackers leaving her body entangled at the fenced entrance to Wincopia Farms. As a direct result of the violent incident, the Federal Anti-Car Theft Act of 1992 (FACTA) was created, the first federal carjacking law. The 1992 act, codified at 18 U.S.C. § 2119, took effect on October 25, 1992.

Around 2002, the Hearn family took out a $4.5 million loan from Gourley and Gourley LLC, a private lending group, secured by the 124 acre property. The Gourley and Gourley loan was provided to the Hearn family to refinance existing financial institution debt already on the property that was in default and awaiting foreclosure. By the Great Recession in the United States in 2007, and after multiple loan extensions (each one increasing the loan amount to add an interest carry reserve to the loan), the Gourley and Gourly debt increased to $10 million. Despite efforts by the Gourley group to encourage the Hearn family to sell the property to a developer, payoff the $10 million loan, and keep the family wealthy, the Hearn family instead insisted on maintaining a struggling nursery. After a long, drawn out bankruptcy by the Hearn group, Gourley and Gourley LLC foreclosed on the property and evicted the Hearn family from the property. Gourley and Gourley then went on to develop the property, obtain preliminary plat approval for 220 home sites, and sell the property for $41 million. Howard County designated the main access, Gorman Road, a scenic road but offered the developer exemptions to reduce setbacks, widen the road, add a pedestrian tunnel, and cut down the 300-year-old trees that bordered the road.

== See also ==
- Murder of Pam Basu
- Savage Mill Historic District
- Victor Myers Farmhouse
