= Hammond Elementary School =

Location
- 8110 Aladdin Drive, Laurel, MD 20723; Laurel, Howard, Maryland 20723; United States
- Coordinates: 39.14°N 76.87°W

Information
- Type: Public Elementary School
- School district: Howard County Public School System
- Principal: Lisa Ciarapica
- Grades: K-5
- Mascot: Tuffy the Tiger
- Website: http://hes.hcpss.org/

Hammond Elementary School and Hammond Middle School is a combination public elementary and middle school in Laurel, Maryland. It is part of Howard County Public School System.

== History ==
The I-95 highway project announced that the highway would be built through the farms of eastern Howard County, Maryland. School Board member Rob Moxley was secretly buying and swapping 10,000 acres of farmland for Howard Research and Development to build Columbia, Maryland. To accommodate the rapid population growth in Howard County, school board member John E. Yingling and Moxley chose to purchase 35 acres of the John T. Leishear farm for $70,000 in 1965 reducing the amount of school property the Rouse Company would have to provide as part of an agreement to build the Columbia development.

The school was designed by the Architect firm of Sandlass, Craycroft & Verkerke of Baltimore with construction bids received in 1970. By 1984, the school deployed 23 Apple IIe computers for students and tested sexual abuse curriculum on the 7th grade class of Hammond Middle. In 1988 Hammond Middle was renovated with a new gym roof and air conditioning retrofits.
