= Patuxent River =

River in Maryland, United States

Patuxent River Patuxent tributary/Patuxent affluent
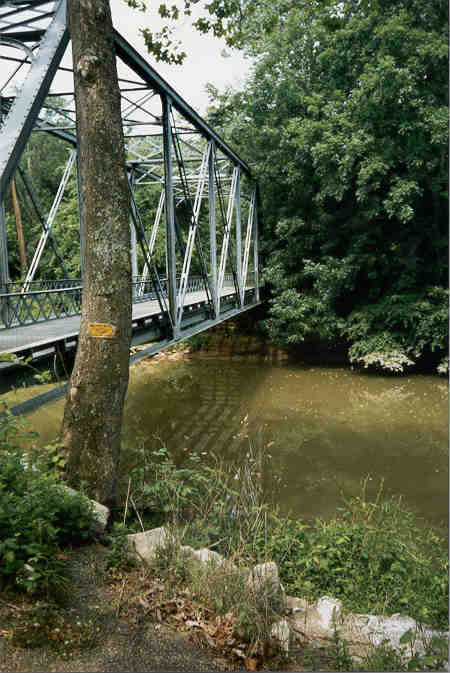
- Patuxent River near Bowie

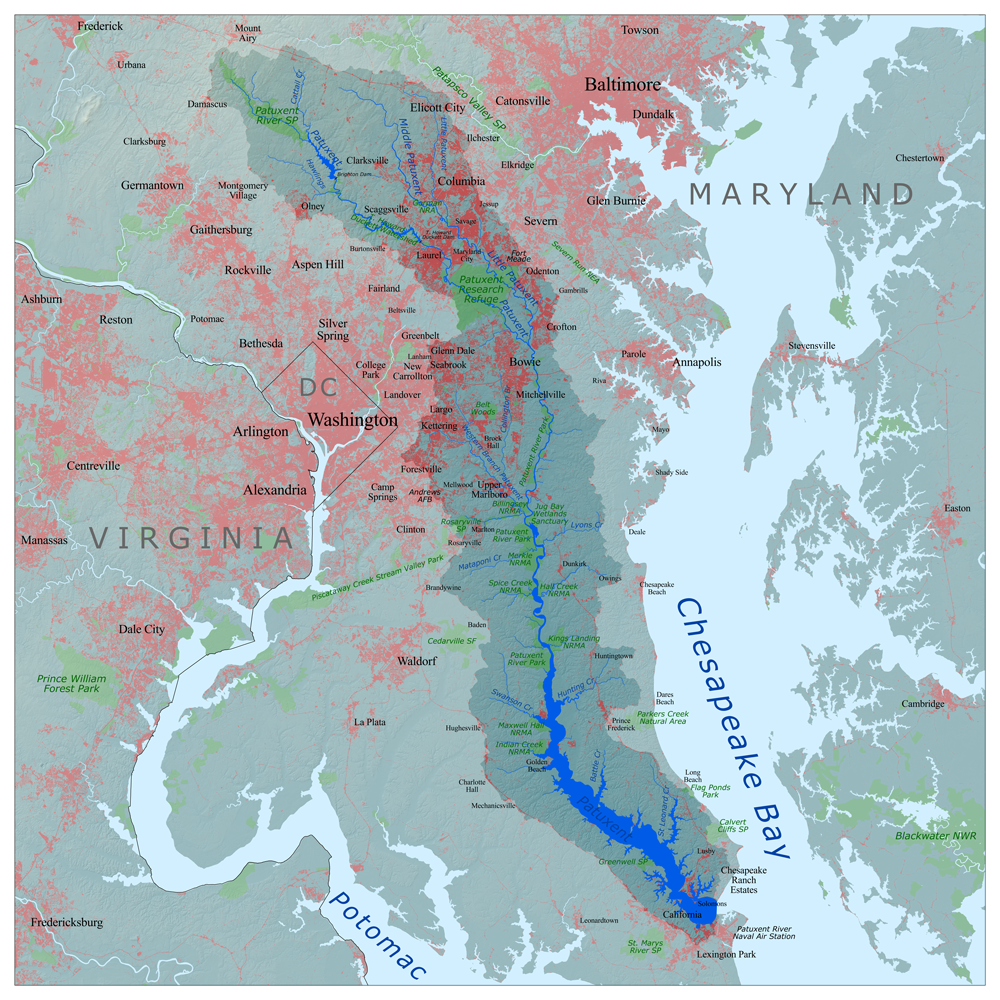
- Patuxent River drainage basin

Location
- Country: United States
- State: Maryland
- Major cities: Columbia, Laurel, Bowie, Upper Marlboro

Physical characteristics
- Source
  - location: 2.3 mi (3.7 km) southwest of Mount Airy, Maryland, U.S.
  - coordinates: 39°20′55″N 77°10′39″W
  - elevation: 823 ft (251 m)
- Mouth: Chesapeake Bay
  - location: 2 mi (3.2 km) east of Solomons, Maryland
  - coordinates: 38°18′43″N 76°25′19″W
  - elevation: 0 ft (0 m)
- Length: 115 mi (185 km)
- Basin size: 908 sq mi (2,350 km^{2})
- Discharge
  - location: Laurel, Maryland
  - average: 171 cu ft/s (4.8 m^{3}/s)
  - minimum: 8 cu ft/s (0.23 m^{3}/s)
  - maximum: 2,870 cu ft/s (81 m^{3}/s)
- Discharge
  - location: Bowie, Maryland
  - average: 647 cu ft/s (18.3 m^{3}/s)
  - minimum: 134 cu ft/s (3.8 m^{3}/s)
  - maximum: 4,500 cu ft/s (130 m^{3}/s)

Basin features
- Tributaries
  - left: Little Patuxent River
  - right: Western Branch

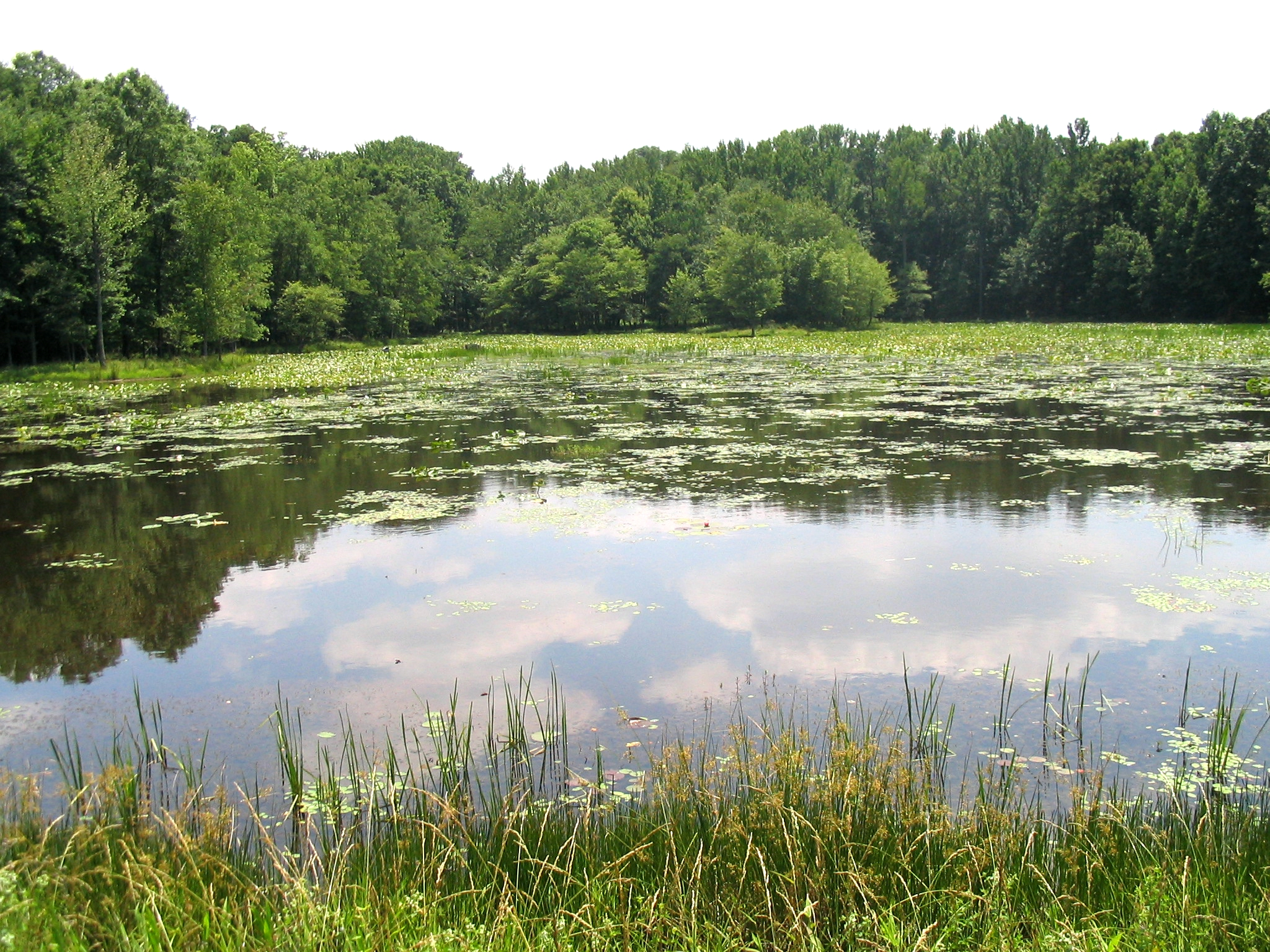
The Patuxent Wildlife Research Center

The Patuxent River is a tributary of the Chesapeake Bay in the state of Maryland. There are three main river drainages for central Maryland: the Potomac River to the west passing through Washington, D.C., the Patapsco River to the northeast passing through Baltimore, and the Patuxent River between the two. The 908-square-mile (2,352 km^{2}) Patuxent watershed had a rapidly growing population of 590,769 in 2000. It is the largest and longest river entirely within Maryland, and its watershed is the largest completely within the state.

== Geography ==
The river source, 115 miles (185 km) from the Chesapeake, is in the hills of the Maryland Piedmont near the intersection of four counties – Howard, Frederick, Montgomery and Carroll, and only 0.6 miles (0.97 km) from Parr's Spring, the source of the south fork of the Patapsco River. Flowing in a generally southeastward direction, the Patuxent crosses the urbanized corridor between Baltimore and Washington, D.C., and opens up into a navigable tidal estuary near the colonial seaport of Queen Anne in Prince George's County, Maryland, just southeast of Bowie. The river is bounded by significant marsh areas for 22 miles (35 km) from the Waysons Corner area to the Hunting Creek confluence. The 52 miles (84 km)-long tidal estuary is never wider than 2.3 miles (3.7 km).

It marks the boundary between Montgomery, Prince George's, Charles and St. Mary's counties on the west and Howard, Anne Arundel, and Calvert counties on the east. The Patuxent estuary's deepest point, 130 feet (40 m) below sea level, is in the lower Patuxent.

The three largest cities in the watershed are Columbia, Bowie, and Laurel, Maryland. There is a percentage of agricultural activity in the region as well. The mid and lower banks of the river have swamp and marshland ecosystems. Many of those ecosystems are protected by some form of parkland, on the state and local levels, the most notable of which include Jug Bay Wetlands Sanctuary, Merkle Wetlands Sanctuary, and Patuxent River Park. Farther north is the 20 square mile Patuxent Wildlife Research Refuge, the largest protected area in the watershed.

=== Tributaries ===
The Little Patuxent River, the Middle Patuxent River, and the Western Branch are the three largest tributaries. The Middle Patuxent flows into the Little Patuxent just upstream from the historic Savage Mill in Savage. The Little Patuxent then joins the Patuxent just southwest of Crofton. The Middle Patuxent flows 24 miles (39 km) through the middle of Howard County, while the Little Patuxent flows 38 miles (61 km) through northeast and southeast Howard County and western Anne Arundel County. Western Branch originates under the name Folly Branch in the Wingate Drive area of the northern part of Glenn Dale, assuming the name "Western Branch" in Woodmore, continuing southward through Prince George's County, joined by Collington Branch before it joins the Patuxent near Upper Marlboro.

== History ==
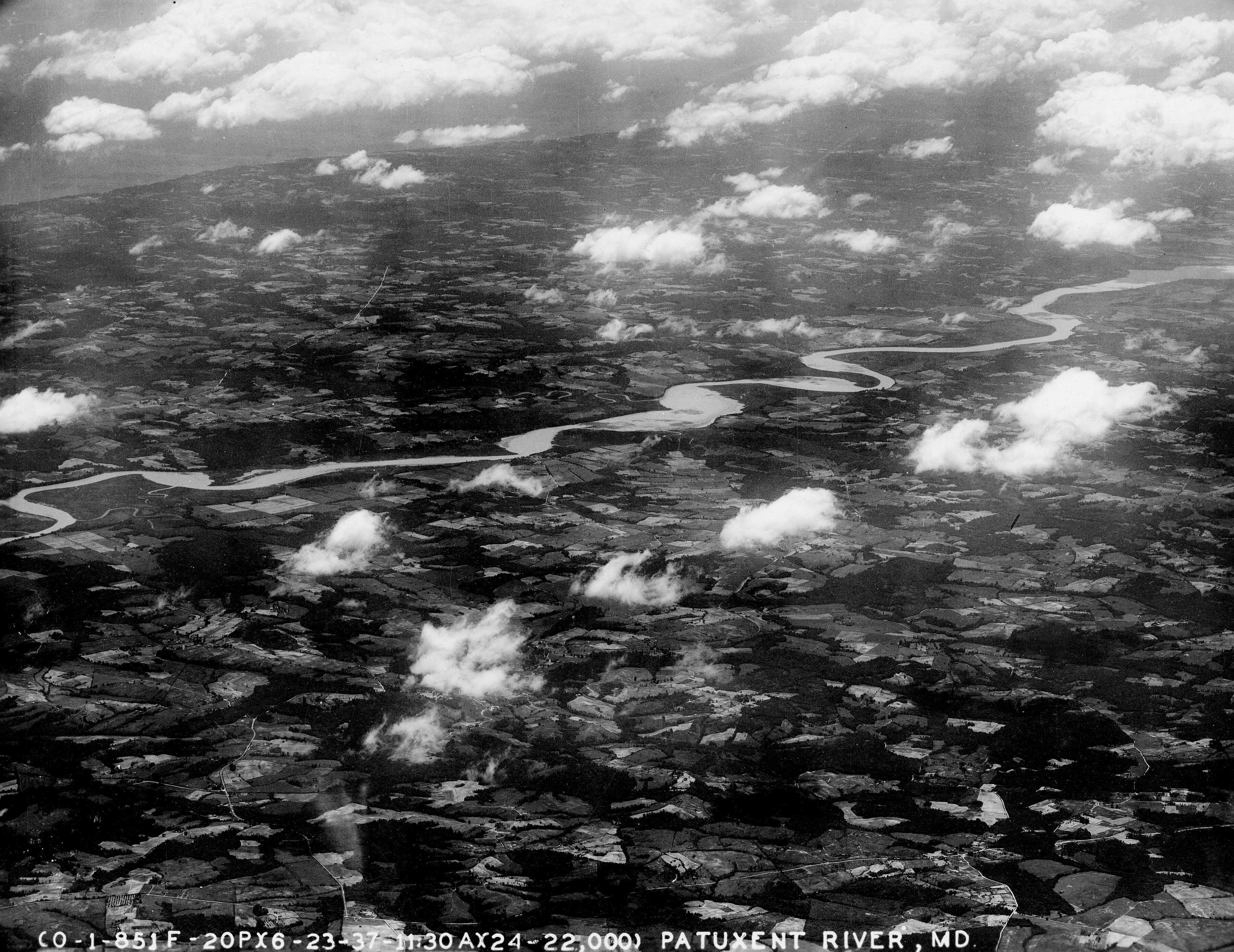
View of the river, 1935

Native Americans have lived along the Patuxent River since at least 1100 BC. An archaeological dig at Pig Point (just north of Jug Bay at the end of Wrighton Road) uncovered some of the oldest known artifacts in the Mid Atlantic states, including pottery, arrow and spear points, and remnants of wigwams, fires and foodways. The site was probably a center of trade in the region and has one of the best unbroken archaeological records on the East Coast. The Pig Point site includes remnants of the oldest structures ever found in Maryland, wigwam post holes dating to the third century.

The word Patuxent is derived from the Algonquian language used by the indigenous people living in the area prior to the arrival of the European settlers. Its meaning is debated. According to some sources it means "water running over loose stones" while others believe it means the "place where tobacco grows".

The Patuxent River was first named ("Pawtuxunt") on the detailed map resulting from the 1608 voyage upriver by Jamestown, Virginia settler John Smith. Captain Smith got as far as the rough vicinity of the present-day Merkle Wildlife Sanctuary (Lyons Creek) area, 40 miles (60 km) from the Chesapeake near what is now the Anne Arundel–Calvert–Prince George's County tripoint. This was most likely the second visit by Europeans to the Patuxent, as in June 1588 a small Spanish expedition under Vicente Gonzalez is believed to have anchored for the night in the Patuxent mouth. The river was an important colonial shipping port with the government's garrison situated at the mouth of the river where Charles Calvert was first Collector in 1673. In 1699, Thomas Browne, sometimes referred to as 'The Patuxent Ranger', followed the river from the Snowden plantation to where Clarksville is sited. In 1702 George Plater I was the Patuxent naval officer (later based at Sotterley Plantation), having earlier served as Collector after Calvert, Rousby, Sewall, Digges, and Payne held the collectorship. By the mid and late seventeenth century respectively, colonists spread upriver to Mt. Calvert and Billingsley Point, two 18th-century mansions 43.5 miles (70 km) upriver from the Chesapeake that are today part of Patuxent River Park. By 1705, the Snowden iron ore furnace (also known as the Patuxent Iron Works) just southeast of Laurel, was shipping "pig iron" downriver from the current vicinity of the 1783 Montpelier Mansion, also part of Patuxent River Park.

In August 1814, Commodore Joshua Barney and his Chesapeake Bay Flotilla were trapped in the Patuxent by the British fleet under Admiral Sir George Cockburn. To keep them from British hands, Barney's men ignited the magazines of his ships in the four mile (6 km) stretch above Pig Point, 44 miles (71 km) upriver from the Chesapeake when the British approached. The British then launched their attack on Washington, D.C., from their warships in the Patuxent at Benedict, 22 miles (35 km) away. From there, the troops marched through Nottingham, Upper Marlboro, Bladensburg, and on to Washington.

== Ecology ==
The Patuxent's waters contain several fish uncommon / not found in the other drainages of Maryland. The stripeback darter, glassy darter, and shield darter all reside within various tributaries in the Patuxent, with the stripeback and glassy darters entirely extirpated from other drainages in the state. The shield darter is found in extremely low densities in the mainstem Potomac river and in fair numbers in the Susquehanna drainage. The upper Patuxent starts in the piedmont, and thus contains several fish not found downstream in the lower coastal plain Patuxent, such as the rosyside dace and cutlips minnow.

== Economy and commerce ==
Tobacco farming dominated the Patuxent's economy for the two centuries following white settlement, with about sixty percent of Maryland's tobacco coming from the Patuxent valley by the late eighteenth century.

Destruction of the plantations by the British and of the soil by centuries of tobacco farming brought the mid and lower Patuxent valley into a period of decline that would last until the 1930s, when there were fewer residents in the Patuxent's Calvert County than there were in the 1840s, and only a few hundred more than in the first Calvert County census in 1790.

The Patuxent was plied by regular steamship service, mostly from the Weems Line, from the 1820s to the 1920s, replacing the schooners and sailing packets that had for the previous centuries served the river's many landings and docks along the 52-mile (84 km) tidal reach.

The Washington Suburban Sanitary Commission constructed two dams on the main branch in the mid-twentieth century. Brighton Dam was constructed 96 miles (154 km) from the Chesapeake in 1943, impounding the waters of Triadelphia Reservoir; in 1952 the T. Howard Duckett Dam was constructed 14 miles (23 km) farther downstream, near Laurel, thus creating Rocky Gorge Reservoir. The land surrounding the two reservoirs is administered by the WSSC, creating a forested reserve of 4,400 acres (18 km^{2}) accessible to the public for horseback riding, hunting, fishing, and picnicking in limited areas. The state of Maryland classifies the T. Howard Duckett Dam as "high hazard" because large releases of water flood areas of North Laurel.

With public recreational land on one or both shores of 74 of the river's 115 miles including the reservoir land, the impact that recreation in natural settings now has on the river's economy is obvious. The Patuxent Naval Air Station at the mouth of the river has continued to grow during past decades along with tourism, providing another main economic engine in the lower river valley that includes the popular boating center of Solomons.

The Patuxent River is the sole known source for Maryland's State Gemstone, a form of agate called Patuxent River stone.

== Environmental concerns ==
According to EcoHealth Report Cards, the Patuxent River has a below average health rating, scoring a 38%, compared to the Chesapeake's over all health rating of 54%, as of 2016. However, the river does have higher ratings in dissolved oxygen, and likely, will soon have higher ratings in phosphorus.

The Middle and Little Patuxent watersheds include nearly all of Columbia, Maryland, including its downtown urban Lake Kittamaqundi and Wilde Lake. Columbia is a large planned community in Howard County that opened in 1967. Columbia's major downtown roadway is called Little Patuxent Parkway, and Maryland Route 175 in East Columbia was known as the Patuxent Parkway until May 2006, when it was renamed for Columbia's founder, the late James Rouse, and his wife, Patty. It was the largely unchecked erosion from this late 1960s and 1970s building spree that contributed the bulk of the Patuxent River's highest and most damaging sediment, siltation, and pollution levels to date downstream. This in turn led to a nearly complete destruction of a once thriving seafood industry along the brackish portion of the river.

"The Patuxent River has known no greater friend, advocate, and defender than Bernie Fowler." Fowler, as an early-1970s Calvert County commissioner, led the way in a lawsuit filed by downriver Charles, Calvert and St. Mary's counties against upriver counties. The lawsuit forced the state, the upriver counties, and the U.S. Environmental Protection Agency to enact pollution control measures. Between 1985 and 2005, the Patuxent saw a 26% decrease in nitrogen, a 46% decrease in phosphorus, and a 35% reduction in sediment, despite urban areas increasing to 31% of the watershed by 2002. Of the Chesapeake's major tributaries, the Patuxent is the only one having most of its harmful phosphorus and nitrogen nutrient overloads coming from urban runoff. The river's other two largest contributors, point sources (industrial, sewage, etc.) and the declining (24%) agricultural areas, contribute less of the nutrient load. Forested areas account for 43% of the watershed.

In 2004, Fred Tutman became the first "Riverkeeper" for the Patuxent. The mission of the Patuxent Riverkeeper organization, a member of the worldwide Waterkeeper Alliance, is to protect and improve the quality of the river's water and watershed and provide access and education at its facility in Nottingham.

Over the past 50 years, nationally recognized land preservation efforts in this part of Maryland have saved tens of thousands of acres from the Baltimore-Washington bedroom community sprawl. The southern half of the U.S. Army's Fort Meade was added to the Patuxent Wildlife Research Center, which, at 12,300 acres (50 km^{2}), is the second largest contiguous public park-refuge within 30 miles (50 km) of either Washington or Baltimore. It is located midway between these two cities. The contiguous public area of 8,575 acres (35 km^{2}) centered on Jug Bay, 42 miles (68 km) upriver from the Chesapeake, form the fifth largest such Baltimore-D.C. preserve and largest tidewater one and consist of the Jug Bay Wetlands Sanctuary, the Merkle Wildlife Sanctuary, and the Jug Bay component of the Patuxent River Park. The 6,600-acre (27 km^{2}) Patuxent River State Park in the uppermost part of the basin is the seventh largest.

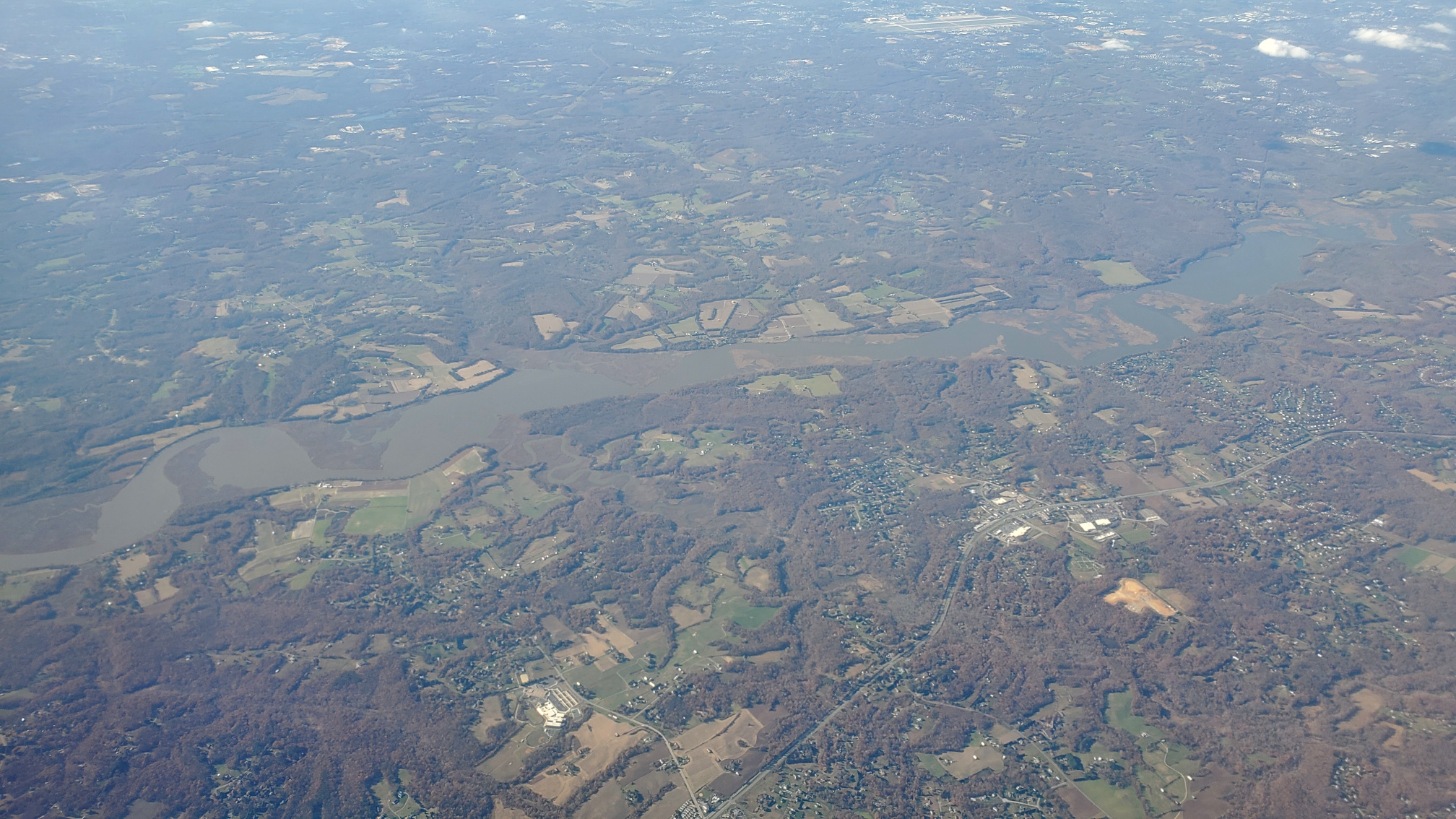
Aerial photograph of the Patuxent River forming the boundary of Calvert County (foreground) and Prince George's County

== Bridges ==
Crossing	Carries	Location	Coordinates
Montgomery County – Howard County
MD 27 bridge	MD 27 (Ridge Road)	Southwest of Mt. Airy	
Windsor Forest Road bridge	Windsor Forest Road	Southwest of Mt. Airy	
Long Corner Road bridge	Long Corner Road	Damascus	
MD 94 bridge	MD 94 (Annapolis Rock Road/Woodbine Road)	Damascus	
Mullinix Mill Road bridge	Mullinix Mill Road	Damascus	
Hipsley Mill Road bridge	Hipsley Mill Road	Etchison	
Howard Chapel Road bridge	Howard Chapel Road	Unity	
MD 97 bridge	MD 97 (Georgia Avenue/Roxbury Mills Road)	North of Brookeville	
Triadelphia Reservoir	Brighton Dam Road	Brookeville; Clarksville	39°12′27″N 77°00′48″W
Haviland Mill Road bridge	Haviland Mill Road	Brinklow	
Mink Hollow Road bridge	Mink Hollow Road	Brinklow	
Snell's Bridge	MD 108 (Ashton Road/Clarksville Pike)	Ashton; Highland	
Brown's Bridge	Ednor Road/Browns Bridge Road	Ashton; Highland	
US 29 bridge over Rocky Gorge Reservoir	US 29 (Columbia Pike)	North of Burtonsville	
Prince George's County – Howard County
I-95 bridge near T. Howard Duckett Dam	I-95	Laurel	
MD 216 bridge	MD 216 (7th Street)	Laurel	
US 1 bridges	US 1 (Washington Boulevard, southbound traffic; 2nd Street, northbound traffic)	Laurel	
Howard County – Prince George's County – Anne Arundel County
B&O bridge	CSX Capital Subdivision	Laurel	
Prince George's County – Anne Arundel County
MD 198 bridge	MD 198 (Laurel Fort Meade Road)	Laurel	
Brock Bridge Road bridge	Brock Bridge Road	Laurel	
Baltimore–Washington Parkway bridge	Baltimore-Washington Parkway	Laurel	
Duval Bridge (not open to public vehicular traffic)	Old Telegraph Road (Lago Road)	Patuxent Wildlife Research Center	
Northeast Corridor bridge	Amtrak Northeast Corridor	Bowie (near Bowie State University)	
Priest Bridge	MD 3 / MD 450 (Robert Crain Highway)	Bowie; Crofton	
US 50 bridge	I-595 / US 50 / US 301 (John Hanson Highway)	Davidsonville	
Governor's Bridge	Governor Bridge Road	Davidsonville	39°00′24″N 76°46′46″W
MD 214 bridge	MD 214 (Central Avenue)	Queen Anne	
Queen Anne Bridge (closed in 2007 to all use)	Queen Anne Bridge Road	Queen Anne	38°53′42.65″N 76°40′34.65″W
Hills Bridge	MD 4 (Pennsylvania Avenue)	Upper Marlboro	
Calvert County – Charles County
Benedict Bridge	MD 231	Benedict	
Calvert County – St. Mary's County
Governor Thomas Johnson Bridge	MD 4	Solomons	38°19′34.7″N 76°28′17.23″W

== See also ==
- List of parks in the Baltimore–Washington metropolitan area – many parks listed are along the Patuxent River
