= Etchison =

Etchison may refer to:

- Etchison, Maryland, U.S.

== People with the surname ==
- Buck Etchison (1915–1980), American baseball player
- Dennis Etchison (born 1943), American writer
