= Maryland Route 94 =

State highway in Howard County, Maryland, US, known as Woodbine Rd

Maryland Route 94
- Woodbine Road
- Maryland Route 94 highlighted in red

Route information
- Maintained by MDSHA
- Length: 6.25 mi (10.06 km)
- Existed: 1927–present

Major junctions
- South end: Montgomery–Howard county line at Patuxent River
- MD 144 in Lisbon; I-70 / US 40 in Lisbon
- North end: Old Frederick Road near Lisbon

Location
- Country: United States
- State: Maryland
- Counties: Howard

Highway system
- Maryland highway system; Interstate; US; State; Scenic Byways
← MD 91	→ I-95

Maryland Route 94 (MD 94) is a state highway in the U.S. state of Maryland. Known as Woodbine Road, the state highway runs 6.25 miles (10.06 km) from the Montgomery–Howard county line at the Patuxent River north to Old Frederick Road near Lisbon. MD 94 originally extended into southern Carroll County in addition to connecting the western Howard County communities of Lisbon and Florence. The state highway was constructed from Lisbon to Woodbine in the late 1910s. MD 94 was constructed from Lisbon south through Florence and from Woodbine north to the village of Daniel south of MD 26 in the late 1920s and early 1930s. The state highway was extended south and removed from the state highway system north of Lisbon in 1956. MD 94 was relocated when its interchange with Interstate 70 (I-70)/U.S. Route 40 (US 40) was built in the mid-1970s. The state highway has two roundabouts, one of which was the first modern roundabout in Maryland.

== Route description ==
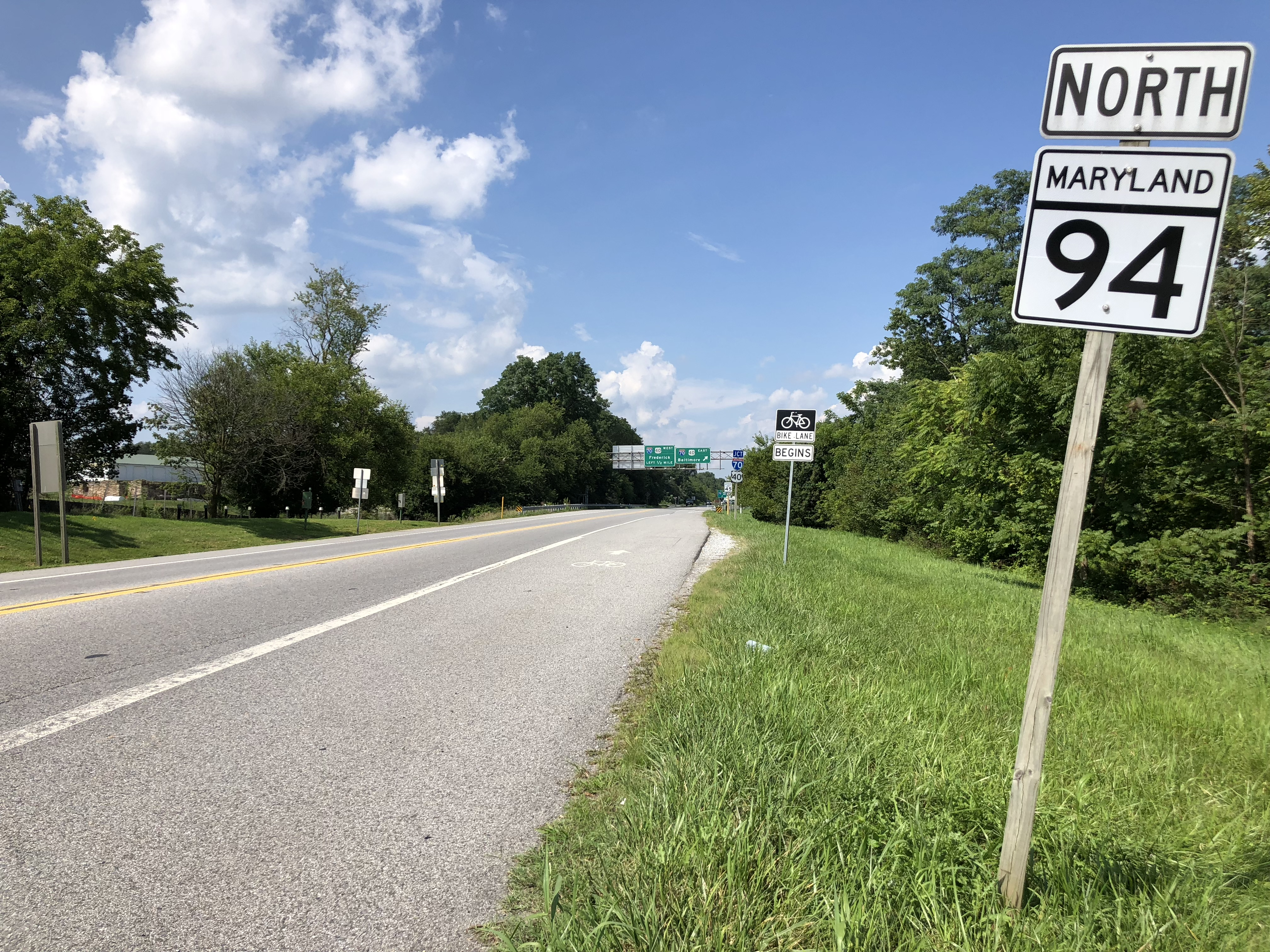
View north along MD 94 at MD 144 in Lisbon

MD 94 begins at the Howard–Montgomery county line at a bridge over the Patuxent River. The highway continues south into Montgomery County as county-maintained Annapolis Rock Road, which intersects MD 108 (Damascus Road) east of Damascus. MD 94 heads northeast as two-lane undivided Woodbine Road and passes through Patuxent River State Park as it ascends out of the narrow river valley and passes to the west of a steep hill named Annapolis Rock. The state highway crosses Cabin Branch and passes through the hamlet of Florence, where the highway intersects Florence Road; Florence Road leads east to the historic homes Cherry Grove and Hobson's Choice. MD 94 continues north through farmland to the village of Lisbon, where the highway meets MD 144 at a roundabout. The state highway meets I-70/US 40 (Baltimore National Pike) at a diamond interchange before reaching its northern terminus at the Lisbon North Roundabout, where Woodbine Road meets Old Frederick Road. Woodbine Road continues north as a county highway to the village of Woodbine on the Patapsco River on the Howard–Carroll county line.

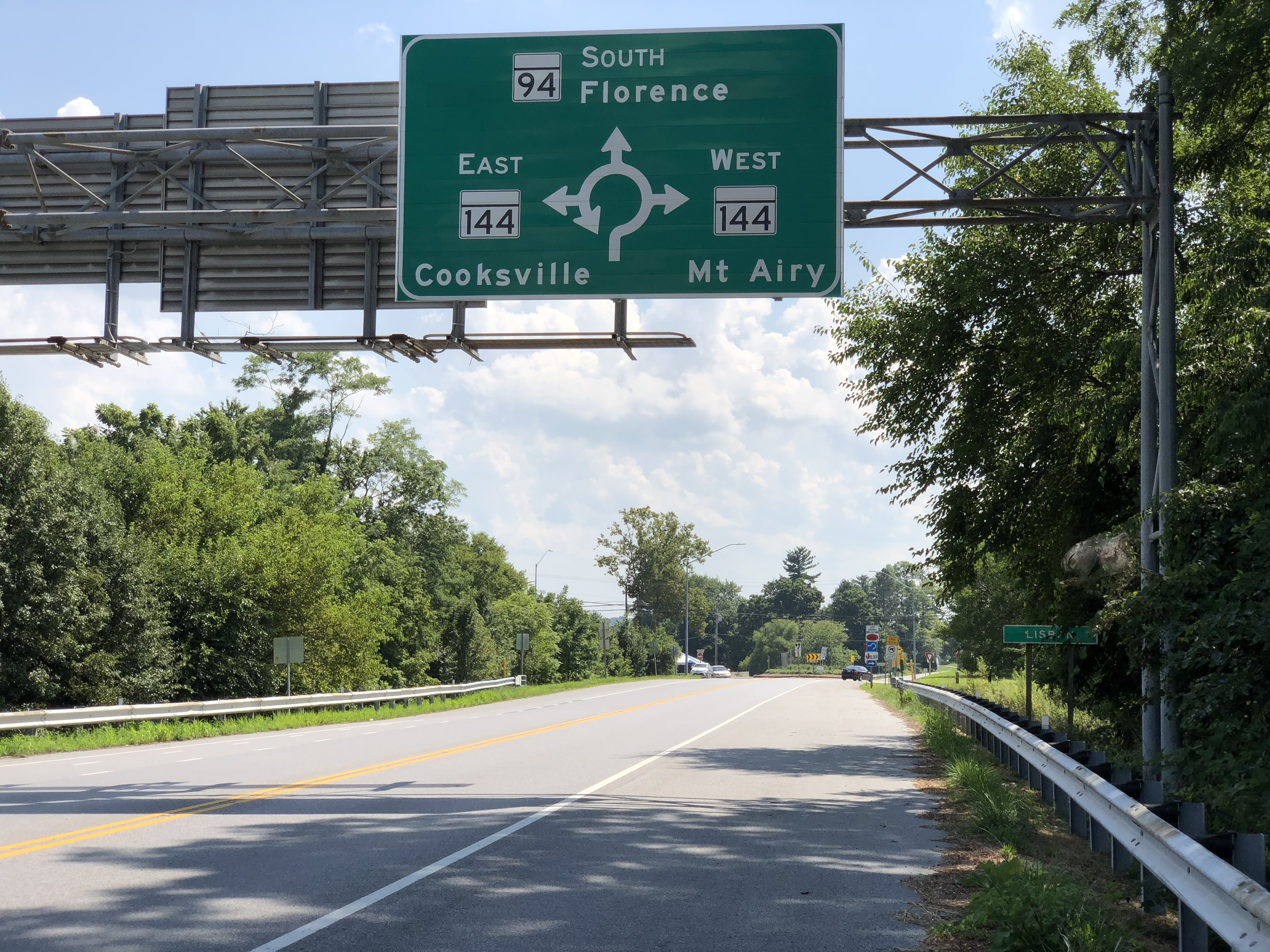
MD 94 southbound approaching MD 144 in Lisbon

== History ==
The first section of MD 94 was built as a 14-foot (4.3 m) wide concrete road from Lisbon to Woodbine in 1916. A concrete arch bridge across the Patapsco River at Woodbine was completed in 1917; a macadam road was constructed north 1 mile (1.6 km) into Carroll County by 1921. Another section of MD 94 was constructed as a concrete road from Lisbon south to Florence in 1926 and 1927. The macadam road in Carroll County was extended north 1 mile (1.6 km) to the hamlet of Day in 1928. MD 94 in Carroll County was extended north in two sections from Day to the village of Daniel starting shortly after 1930; this macadam road was completed to near Buckhorn Road a short distance south of MD 26 in Winfield by 1933. The concrete road through Florence was extended to just north of Cabin Creek in 1933.

In 1956, MD 94's present termini were established. The state highway was extended from south of Florence to the Patuxent River; the highway was also transferred to county maintenance from Old Frederick Road north to Daniel. MD 94 was relocated to form a four-way intersection with MD 144 when its interchange with I-70 was constructed in 1974. The state highway previously had a short concurrency with MD 144 in Lisbon between the road south to Florence and the highway north to Woodbine; the old alignment remains south of I-70 as Madison Street and north of the Interstate as Old Woodbine Road. The first modern roundabout constructed in Maryland was completed at the intersection of MD 94 and MD 144 in 1993. The roundabout with Old Frederick Road at the state highway's northern terminus was built in 1998.

== Junction list ==
The entire route is in Howard County.

Location	mi	km	Destinations	Notes
	0.00	0.00	Annapolis Rock Road south to MD 108 – Damascus	Montgomery County line at Patuxent River; southern terminus
Lisbon	5.45	8.77	MD 144 (Frederick Road) – Mount Airy, Cooksville	Roundabout
Lisbon	5.85	9.41	I-70 / US 40 (Baltimore National Pike) – Frederick, Baltimore	I-70 Exit 73
Lisbon	6.25	10.06	Old Frederick Road / Woodbine Road north – Woodbine	Lisbon North Roundabout; northern terminus
1.000 mi = 1.609 km; 1.000 km = 0.621 mi
