= Maryland Route 650 =

Highway in Maryland, United States

Maryland Route 650
- Maryland Route 650 highlighted in red

Route information
- Maintained by MDSHA
- Length: 25.89 mi (41.67 km)
- Existed: 1939–present

Major junctions
- South end: New Hampshire Avenue at the District of Columbia boundary in Takoma Park
- MD 410 in Takoma Park; MD 193 in Langley Park; I-495 in Hillandale; US 29 in White Oak; Randolph Road in Colesville; MD 200 Toll in Colesville; MD 198 in Spencerville; MD 108 in Ashton; MD 97 in Sunshine
- North end: MD 108 in Etchison

Location
- Country: United States
- State: Maryland
- Counties: Prince George's, Montgomery

Highway system
- Maryland highway system; Interstate; US; State; Scenic Byways
← MD 648	→ MD 652

Maryland Route 650 (MD 650) is a state highway in the U.S. state of Maryland. Known as New Hampshire Avenue for most of its length, the state highway runs 25.89 mi (41.67 km) from Eastern Avenue at the Washington, D.C. border north to MD 108 in Etchison. MD 650 serves as a major north-south commuter route in northwestern Prince George's County and eastern Montgomery County, connecting the District of Columbia with the residential suburbs of Takoma Park, Langley Park, Adelphi, Hillandale, White Oak, and Colesville. By contrast, the part of MD 650 north of Spencerville is a quiet rural road connecting several small communities along the northeastern fringe of Montgomery County.

MD 650 was originally built between Takoma Park and Adelphi in the late 1930s as an extension of New Hampshire Avenue out of Washington. In the 1950s, the state highway was extended north, taking over portions of MD 320 and U.S. Route 29 (US 29) and all of MD 116. Beginning in the 1950s and continuing through the 1990s, MD 650 has been expanded to a multi-lane divided highway in stages from its southern terminus north to Spencerville.

== Route description ==
MD 650 is a part of the National Highway System as a principal arterial from its southern terminus north to MD 108 in Ashton.

=== Takoma Park to White Oak ===
MD 650 begins at Eastern Avenue on the border of Washington, D.C. New Hampshire Avenue continues south into the District of Columbia. MD 650 heads northeast as a six-lane divided highway lined with shopping centers. The state highway straddles the border between Prince George's County on the east and Montgomery County on the west, as well as the eastern border of the city of Takoma Park. MD 650 intersects Poplar Avenue and Ray Road, which were formerly MD 204, before the present state highway meets MD 410, which heads west as Ethan Allen Avenue and east as East–West Highway. After crossing MD 410, MD 650 fully enters both Takoma Park and Montgomery County. The state highway heads into a forested area with some residences, where it intersects Sligo Creek Parkway and the Sligo Creek Trail on a bridge crossing Sligo Creek. MD 650 continues into an area of apartment buildings and single family residences, then passes between a couple of shopping centers before intersecting MD 193 (University Boulevard) in Langley Park, where the Takoma Langley Crossroads Transit Center is located at the northwest corner of the intersection.

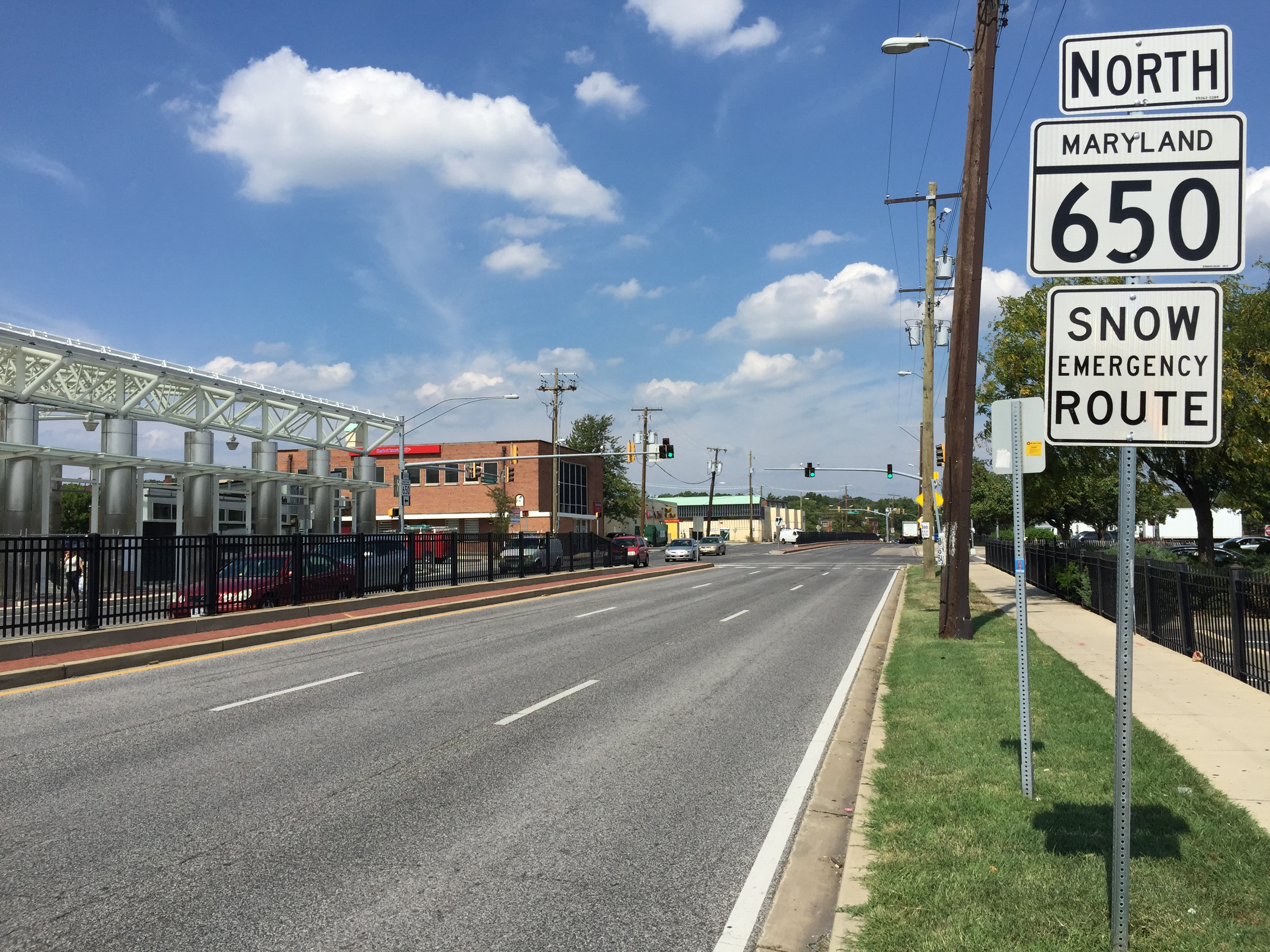
View north along MD 650 at MD 193 in Langley Park

MD 650 continues north into Prince George's County for the second time. After passing more shopping centers and apartment complexes, the state highway crosses Northwest Branch and then immediately meets MD 320 at its eastern terminus. Further north, the highway enters Adelphi. MD 650 continues through apartment complexes and passes Metzerott Road on the east and Northampton Drive on the west, where the route enters Montgomery County for good. The state highway heads past residences on service roads and intersects Adelphi Road, which heads toward the University of Maryland. MD 650 meets Interstate 495 (Capital Beltway) at a cloverleaf interchange in Hillandale. After passing a shopping center on the right, the state highway reaches an intersection with the former National Labor College on the west and Powder Mill Road, which heads east toward MD 212. MD 650 turns northwest through residential areas in White Oak. The northbound direction gains a fourth lane ahead of passing the former Naval Ordnance Laboratory campus to the east, which is now the White Oak Federal Research Center occupied by the Food and Drug Administration. After passing the federal research center, MD 650 enters a commercial area and intersects Lockwood Drive, which was formerly MD 895, before it meets US 29 at a partial cloverleaf interchange.

=== White Oak to Etchison ===
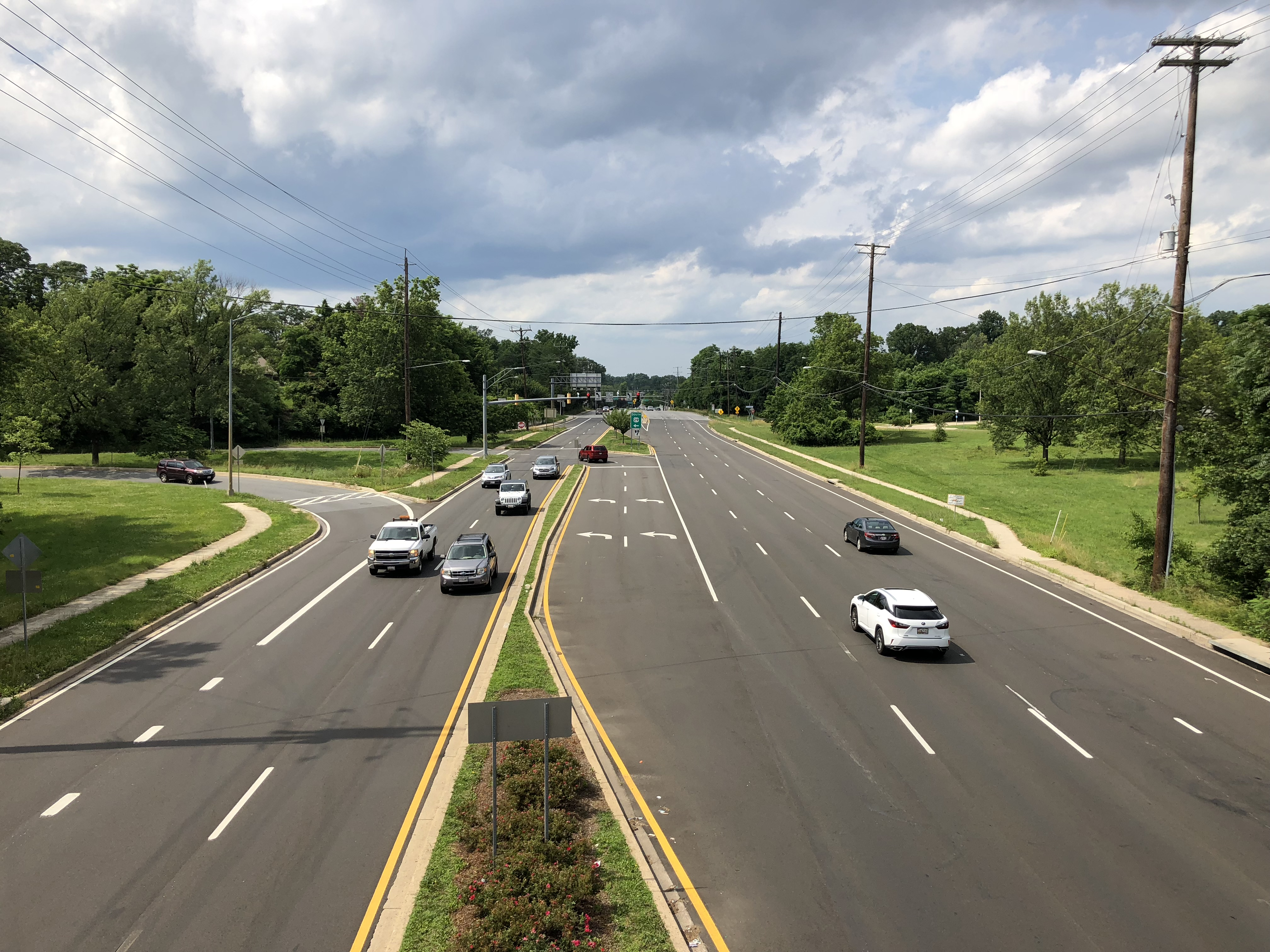
MD 650 northbound past the US 29 interchange in White Oak

MD 650 reduces to three lanes northbound beyond US 29. The stretch of road north of US 29 includes the first official infrastructure repair project started under the American Recovery and Reinvestment Act of 2009, a repaving job and sidewalk improvements between Milestone Drive and Venice Drive. MD 650 then enters a commercial area in Colesville, where the highway intersects Randolph Road. MD 650 continues through residential areas north of Colesville. The state highway comes to a single-point urban interchange with MD 200 (Intercounty Connector), where it intersects the eastern terminus of a section of the ICC Trail, after which the road slims down to a four-lane divided highway ahead of the intersection with Good Hope Road and Bonifant Road. MD 650 then enters Cloverly, which features intersections with Norwood Road, which leads west to MD 182, and Briggs Chaney Road, which leads east back to US 29. After leaving Cloverly, the state highway continues through a forested area with scattered subdivisions before reaching the intersection of MD 198 (Spencerville Road) and Norbeck Road, which leads west to MD 28.

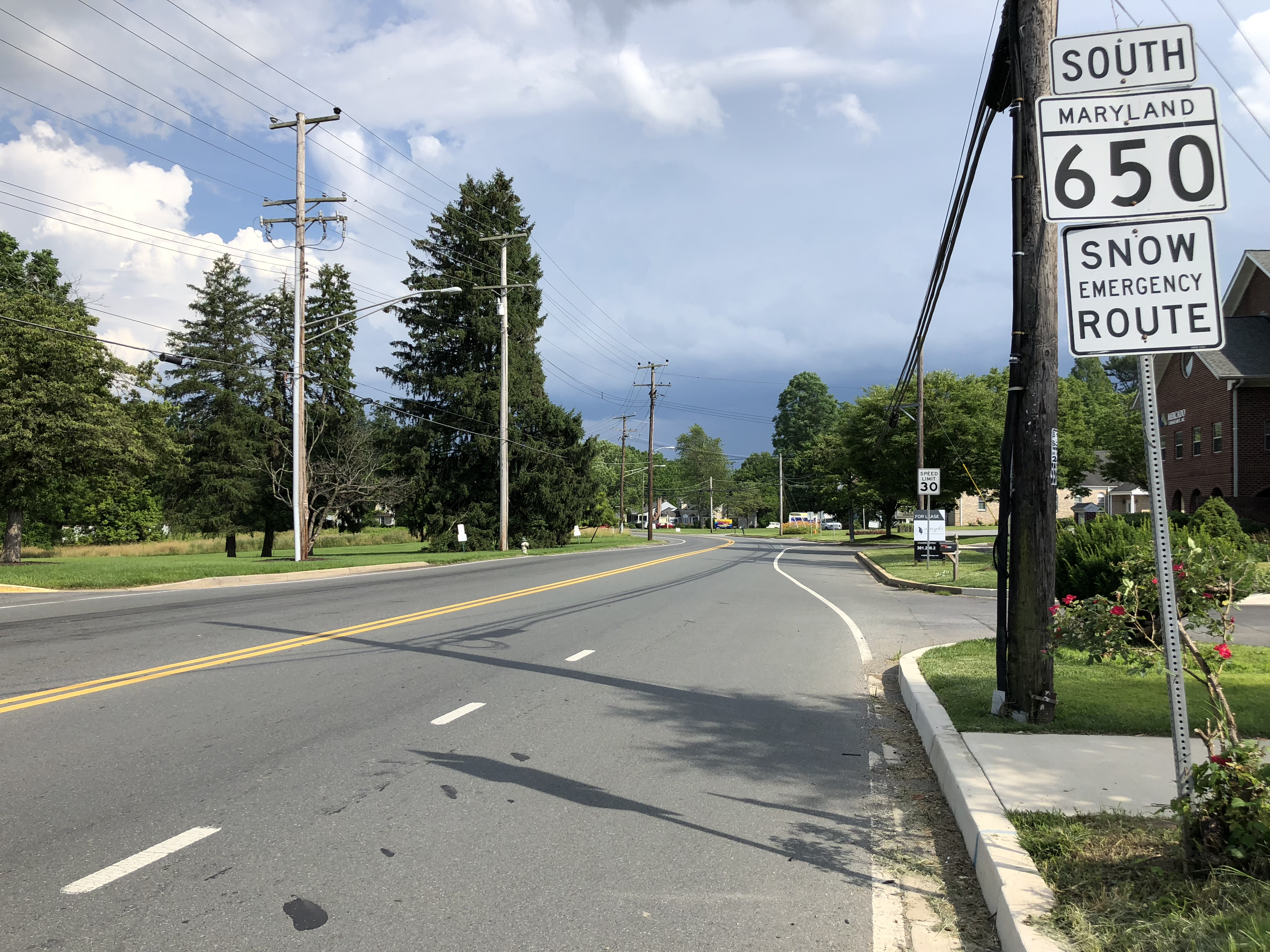
MD 650 southbound past MD 108 in Ashton

North of Spencerville, MD 650 becomes a two-lane road, passing several churches, subdivisions, and the Hampshire Greens Golf Course to the west. The state highway passes through the hamlet of Ednor, where it intersects Ednor Road and passes by the historic home Clifton. After Ednor Road, MD 650 continues through forested areas with scattered residential subdivisions. The state highway then reaches the community of Ashton. MD 650 meets MD 108, which is named Olney Sandy Spring Road headed west and Ashton Road headed east at an intersection surrounded by a few small shopping centers.

MD 650 turns north and heads through a mix of farms and scattered residences on large lots. After passing through the hamlet of Brinklow, the state highway turns to the northwest as it crosses the Hawlings River. MD 650 intersects Brighton Dam Road, which heads west toward Brookeville. After passing several subdivisions of large houses and under some transmission lines, MD 650 enters the hamlet of Sunshine, where the road intersects MD 97 (Georgia Avenue). After crossing MD 97, MD 650 changes its name to Damascus Road. The next hamlet is Unity, where Sundown Road splits to the west toward Laytonsville. After leaving Unity, the state highway continues northwest through scattered subdivisions and farmland. MD 650 enters the unincorporated community of Etchison, where the state highway reaches its northern terminus at its second meeting with MD 108. MD 108 heads south and east toward Laytonsville as Laytonsville Road, while that state highway takes over Damascus Road toward Damascus.

== History ==
Maryland Route 116
- Location: Ashton–Brinklow
- Existed: 1928–1960

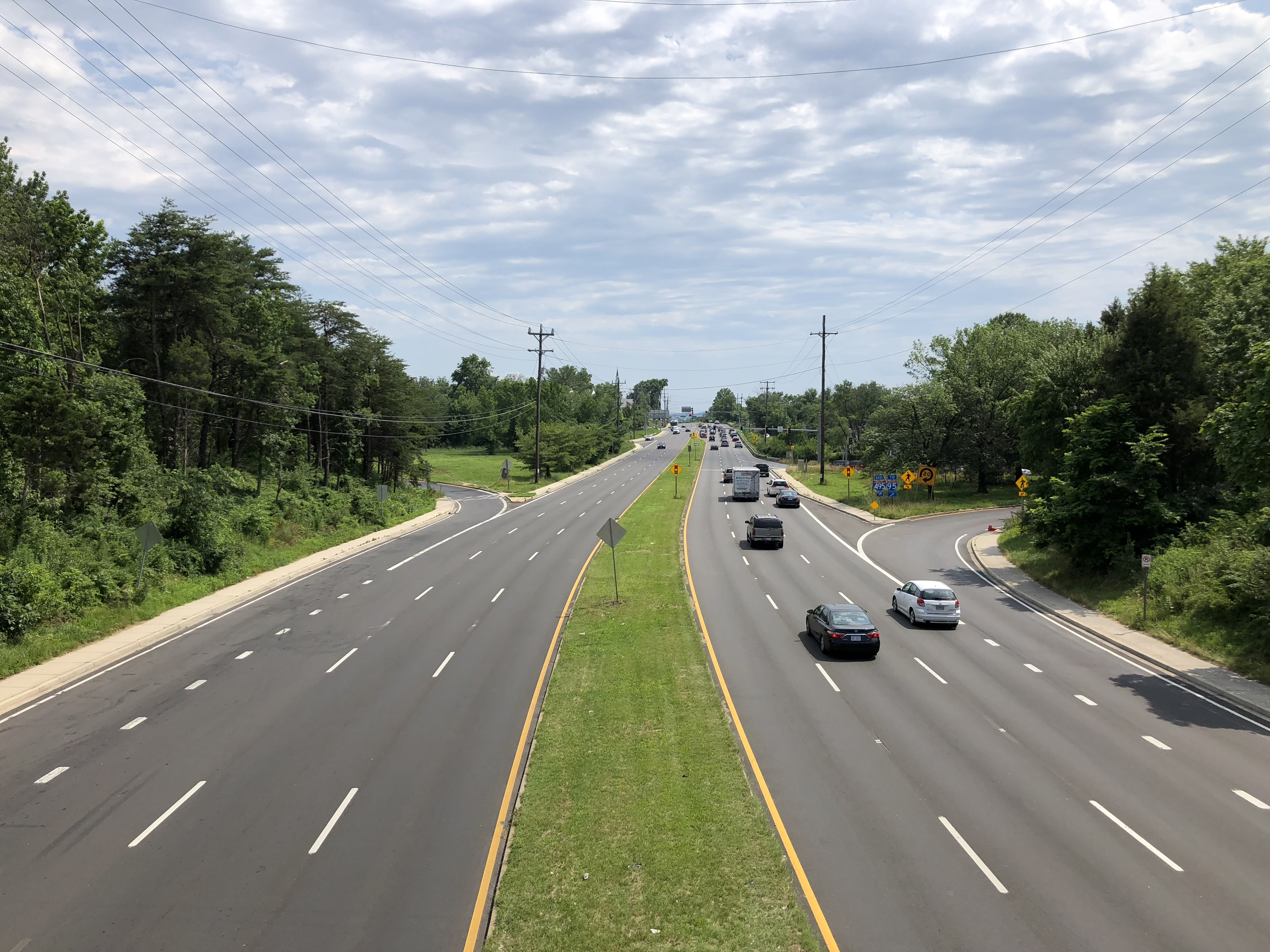
View south along MD 650 from I-495 in Hillandale

MD 650 began as a continuation of New Hampshire Avenue out of Washington. The state highway was planned by 1935 roughly following Sligo Mill Road to the site of the defunct mill at the current intersection with Sligo Creek Parkway, then east to near the intersection of MD 193 and MD 212 in Langley Park. By 1939, MD 650 was complete between Eastern Avenue and MD 193, but along its present alignment. The segment between MD 193 and MD 320 had also started construction, which was complete by 1946.

The remainder of the current alignment resulted from MD 650 taking over parts of three other routes between 1955 and 1960: MD 320, US 29, and MD 116 (Damascus Road). MD 320 continued north from its eastern terminus to the current intersection with Lockwood Drive in White Oak. From there, US 29 used Colesville Road through the namesake village up to Ashton, where the federal highway used the route of present-day MD 108 east to Ellicott City. MD 116 continued north and west to the present northern terminus of MD 650. MD 116 originally only went from Ashton north to Brighton in 1930, but the former state highway was extended north to Sunshine in 1949 and Etchison in 1956.

MD 650 assumed MD 320's route north to White Oak in 1955. The next year, the original portion of MD 650 was rebuilt as a multi-lane divided highway. In 1960, MD 650 took over the old route of US 29 between White Oak and Ashton when US 29 was shifted to the new Columbia Pike, then took over all of MD 116. The divided highway was extended to White Oak in the 1960s, to Colesville in the 1970s, and to Spencerville in the 1990s.

== Junction list ==
County	Location	mi	km	Destinations	Notes
Prince George's	Takoma Park	0.00	0.00	New Hampshire Avenue south / Eastern Avenue – Washington	District of Columbia boundary; southern terminus
Prince George's	Takoma Park	0.81	1.30	MD 410 (East–West Highway/Ethan Allen Avenue) – Hyattsville, Takoma Park	
Montgomery	Takoma Park	1.24	2.00	Sligo Creek Parkway west	Eastern terminus of Sligo Creek Parkway
Prince George's	Langley Park	1.85	2.98	MD 193 (University Boulevard) – College Park, Silver Spring	
Prince George's	Adelphi	2.78	4.47	MD 320 south (Piney Branch Road) – Silver Spring	Northern terminus of MD 320
Montgomery	Hillandale	4.04	6.50	I-495 (Capital Beltway) to I-95 – Northern Virginia, Silver Spring, Baltimore, College Park	I-495 Exit 28
Montgomery	White Oak	5.97	9.61	US 29 (Columbia Pike) – Silver Spring, Columbia	Partial cloverleaf interchange
Montgomery	Colesville	8.34	13.42	Randolph Road – Glenmont, Calverton	
Montgomery	Colesville	9.24	14.87	MD 200 Toll (Intercounty Connector) to I-95 / I-270	MD 200 Exit 13; single-point urban interchange; E-ZPass or Video Tolling
Montgomery	Spencerville	11.81	19.01	MD 198 east (Spencerville Road) / Norbeck Road west – Burtonsville, Norbeck	Western terminus of MD 198
Montgomery	Ashton	14.31	23.03	MD 108 (Olney Sandy Spring Road/Ashton Road) – Olney, Clarksville	
Montgomery	Sunshine	20.66	33.25	MD 97 (Georgia Avenue) – Brookeville, Cooksville	
Montgomery	Etchison	25.89	41.67	MD 108 (Laytonsville Road/Damascus Road) – Laytonsville, Damascus	Northern terminus
1.000 mi = 1.609 km; 1.000 km = 0.621 mi: Electronic toll collection
