= Ashton-Sandy Spring, Maryland =

- Census-designated place
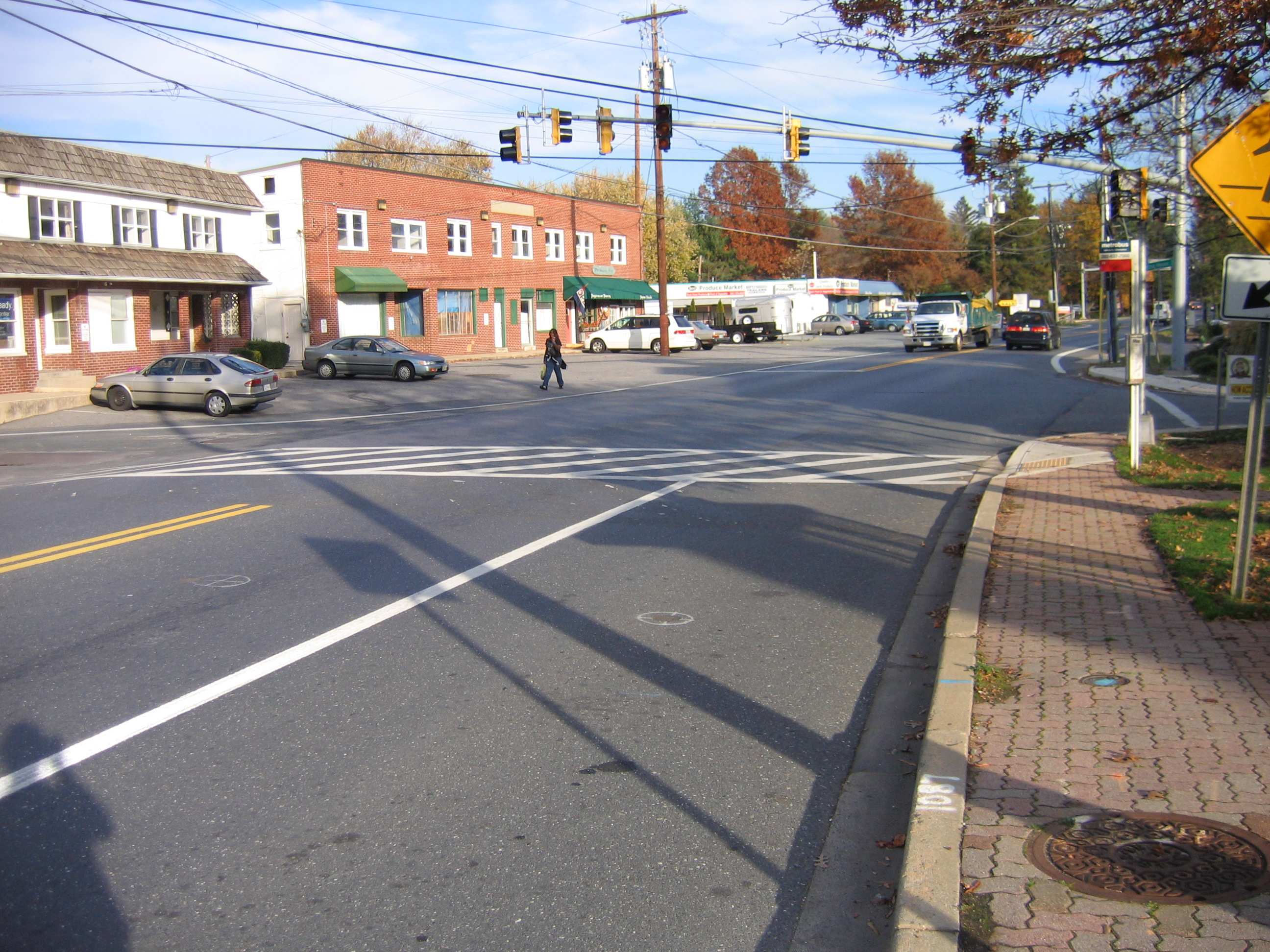
- Route 108 in Sandy Spring, Maryland, in November 2006

- Location of Ashton-Sandy Spring in Montgomery County, Maryland
- Coordinates: 39°08′58″N 76°59′45″W
- Country: United States
- State: Maryland
- County: Montgomery

Area
  - Total: 10.36 sq mi (26.83 km^{2})
  - Land: 10.26 sq mi (26.57 km^{2})
  - Water: 0.10 sq mi (0.26 km^{2})
- Elevation: 440 ft (130 m)

Population (2020)
  - Total: 5,746
  - Density: 560.2/sq mi (216.29/km^{2})
- Time zone: UTC−5 (Eastern (EST))
  - Summer (DST): UTC−4 (EDT)
- FIPS code: 24-02762
- GNIS feature ID: 2389153

Ashton-Sandy Spring is a census-designated place (CDP) in Montgomery County, Maryland, United States. The CDP is designated to include the two unincorporated communities of Ashton and Sandy Spring, as well as the smaller community of Brinklow. It had a population of 5,746 as of the 2020 census.

== Geography ==
According to the U.S. Census Bureau, it has a total area of 7.6 square miles (20 km^{2}), 7.6 square miles (20 km^{2}) of which is land and 0.04 square miles (0.10 km^{2}) (0.26%) of which is water.

== Demographics ==
Historical population
Census	Pop.	Note	%±
2000	3,437		—
2010	5,628		63.7%
2020	5,746		2.1%
U.S. Decennial Census; 2010–2020

=== Racial and ethnic composition ===
Ashton-Sandy Spring CDP, Maryland – Racial and ethnic composition Note: the US Census treats Hispanic/Latino as an ethnic category. This table excludes Latinos from the racial categories and assigns them to a separate category. Hispanics/Latinos may be of any race.
Race / Ethnicity (NH = Non-Hispanic)	Pop 2000	Pop 2010	Pop 2020	% 2000	% 2010	% 2020
White alone (NH)	2,727	3,814	3,388	79.34%	67.77%	58.96%
Black or African American alone (NH)	412	780	796	11.99%	13.86%	13.85%
Native American or Alaska Native alone (NH)	6	5	4	0.17%	0.09%	0.07%
Asian alone (NH)	118	466	592	3.43%	8.28%	10.30%
Native Hawaiian or Pacific Islander alone (NH)	0	3	3	0.00%	0.05%	0.05%
Other race alone (NH)	8	8	55	0.23%	0.14%	0.96%
Mixed race or Multiracial (NH)	45	179	304	1.31%	3.18%	5.29%
Hispanic or Latino (any race)	121	373	604	3.52%	6.63%	10.51%
Total	3,437	5,628	5,746	100.00%	100.00%	100.00%

=== 2020 census ===
As of the 2020 census, Ashton-Sandy Spring had a population of 5,746. The median age was 46.2 years. 21.8% of residents were under the age of 18 and 22.4% of residents were 65 years of age or older. For every 100 females, there were 94.6 males, and for every 100 females age 18 and over, there were 90.4 males age 18 and over.

64.0% of residents lived in urban areas, while 36.0% lived in rural areas.

There were 1,865 households in Ashton-Sandy Spring, of which 34.0% had children under the age of 18 living in them. Of all households, 66.3% were married-couple households, 11.0% were households with a male householder and no spouse or partner present, and 19.2% were households with a female householder and no spouse or partner present. About 16.8% of all households were made up of individuals, and 10.4% had someone living alone who was 65 years of age or older.

There were 2,025 housing units, of which 7.9% were vacant. The homeowner vacancy rate was 1.3% and the rental vacancy rate was 15.8%.

Racial composition as of the 2020 census
Race	Number	Percent
White	3,521	61.3%
Black or African American	812	14.1%
American Indian and Alaska Native	33	0.6%
Asian	595	10.4%
Native Hawaiian and Other Pacific Islander	3	0.1%
Some other race	242	4.2%
Two or more races	540	9.4%

=== 2010 census ===
As of the 2010 census, there were 5,628 people, 1,839 households, and 1,434 families residing in the area. The population density was 740.5 inhabitants per square mile (285.9/km^{2}). There were 1,936 housing units at an average density of 254.7 per square mile (98.3/km^{2}). The racial makeup of the area was 71.7% White, 14.2% African American, 0.2% Native American, 8.3% Asian, 1.6% from other races, and 3.8% from two or more races. Hispanic or Latino of any race were 6.6% of the population.

There were 1,839 households, out of which 35.9% had children under the age of 18 living with them, 66.6% were married couples living together, 8.5% had a female householder with no husband present, and 22.0% were non-families. 19.1% of all households were made up of individuals living alone, and 12.3% had someone living alone who was 65 years of age or older. The average household size was 2.91 and the average family size was 3.34.

In the area the population was spread out, with 25.3% under the age of 18, 6.3% from 18 to 24, 16.7% from 25 to 44, 32.9% from 45 to 64, and 18.8% who were 65 years of age or older. The median age was 46 years. For every 100 females, there were 88.4 males. For every 100 females age 18 and over, there were 85.4 males.

=== Income and poverty ===
A 2013 survey estimated that the median household income in the area was $119,432, and the median income for a family was $163,403. Males had an estimated median income of $86,250 versus $94,861 for females. The estimated per capita income for the area was $62,468. The survey estimated about 6.9% of families and 7.2% of the population were below the poverty line, including 9.1% of those under age 18 and 9.7% of those age 65 or over.
