= Maryland Route 108 =

State highway in Maryland, US

Maryland Route 108
- MD 108 highlighted in red

Route information
- Maintained by MDSHA
- Length: 34.23 mi (55.09 km)
- Existed: 1927–present

Major junctions
- West end: MD 27 in Damascus
- MD 124 in Damascus; MD 97 in Olney; MD 182 in Sandy Spring; MD 650 at Ashton; MD 216 at Highland; MD 32 in Clarksville; US 29 in Columbia; MD 100 / MD 104 in Columbia
- East end: MD 175 in Columbia

Location
- Country: United States
- State: Maryland
- Counties: Montgomery, Howard

Highway system
- Maryland highway system; Interstate; US; State; Scenic Byways
← MD 107	→ MD 109

Maryland Route 108 (MD 108) is a state highway in the U.S. state of Maryland. The highway runs 34.23 miles (55.09 km) from MD 27 in Damascus east to MD 175 in Columbia. MD 108 is an S-shaped highway that winds through northern Montgomery County and central Howard County. The highway connects the Montgomery County communities of Laytonsville, Olney, Sandy Spring, and Ashton with the Howard County villages of Highland and Clarksville. MD 108 serves as the northern edge of Columbia and connects several of the planned community's suburban villages.

MD 108 originally connected Damascus with Olney. This highway was constructed between the mid-1920s and early 1930s. MD 108 from Olney to Columbia, part of Clarksville Pike, was originally constructed as MD 28 from Olney to Ashton and the original MD 27—later U.S. Route 29 (US 29)—from Ashton to Columbia. The highway was constructed near Columbia in the mid-1910s and from there to Olney in the late 1910s. MD 108 east of US 29 originally consisted of a county road and MD 531, which was built in the early 1930s and later became MD 175. MD 108 was extended east from Olney to Ashton in the mid-1940s and from Ashton to MD 175 in 1960 after US 29's present highway was built. The highway was extended to its present eastern terminus in the mid-1970s. MD 108 was expanded to a divided highway in Columbia in the late 1980s and in Olney in the mid-1990s.

== Route description ==
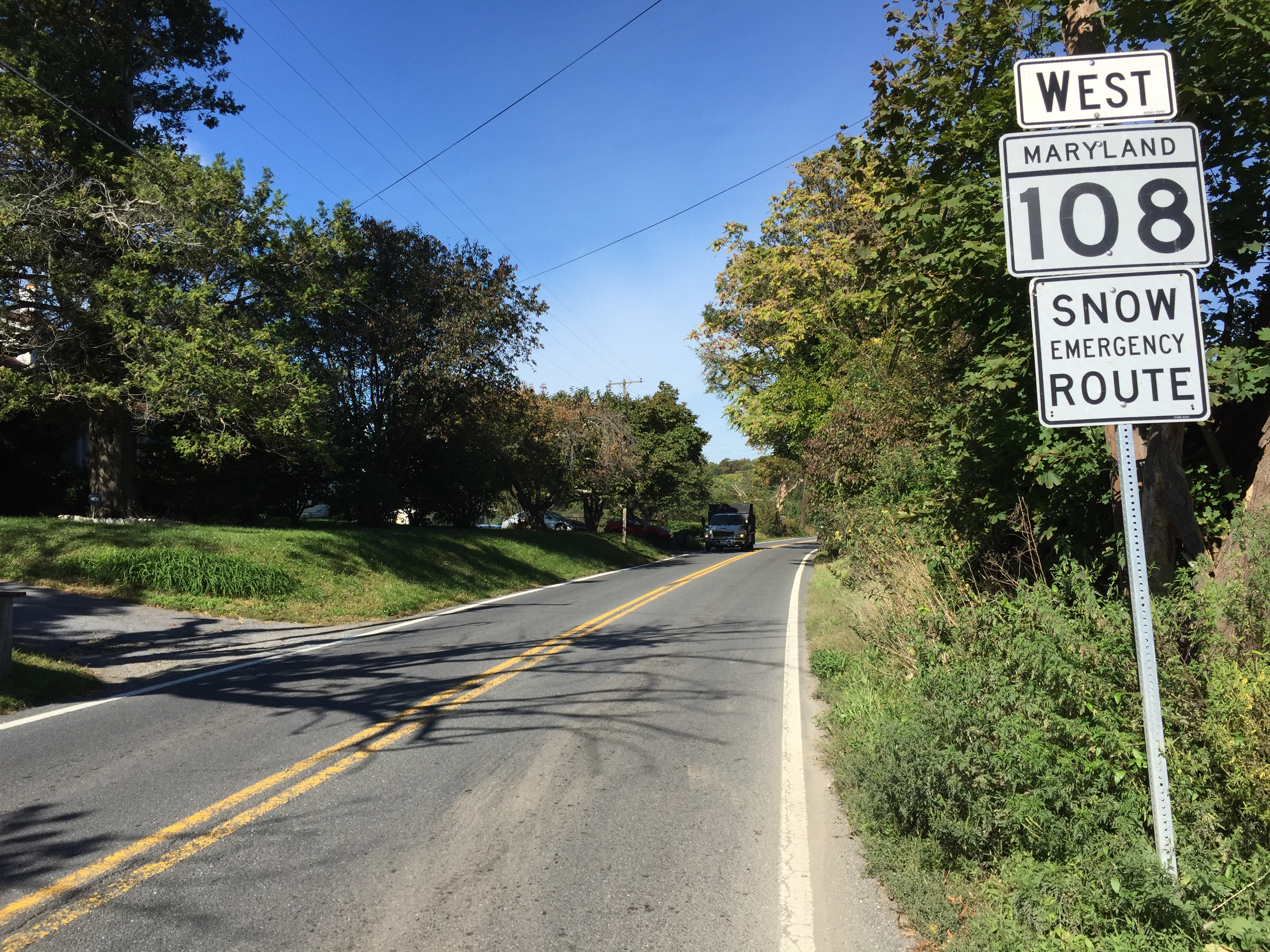
MD 108 westbound past MD 650 in Etchison

MD 108 begins at a three-way intersection with MD 27 (Ridge Road) in the center of Damascus. The latter highway heads north and west from the intersection; MD 108 heads east as four-lane undivided Main Street. The street reduces to two lanes just east of Woodfield Road, which heads south as MD 124. MD 108's name changes to Damascus Road at Howard Chapel Road at the east end of the village. The highway heads southeast and meets the southern end of Annapolis Rock Road, which leads to MD 94 at the Montgomery–Howard county line. MD 108 meets the northern end of MD 650 (Damascus Road) in the hamlet of Etchison, where the highway turns south onto Laytonsville Road. The route intersects Brink Road and Sundown Road next to the Layton House in the center of the town of Laytonsville.

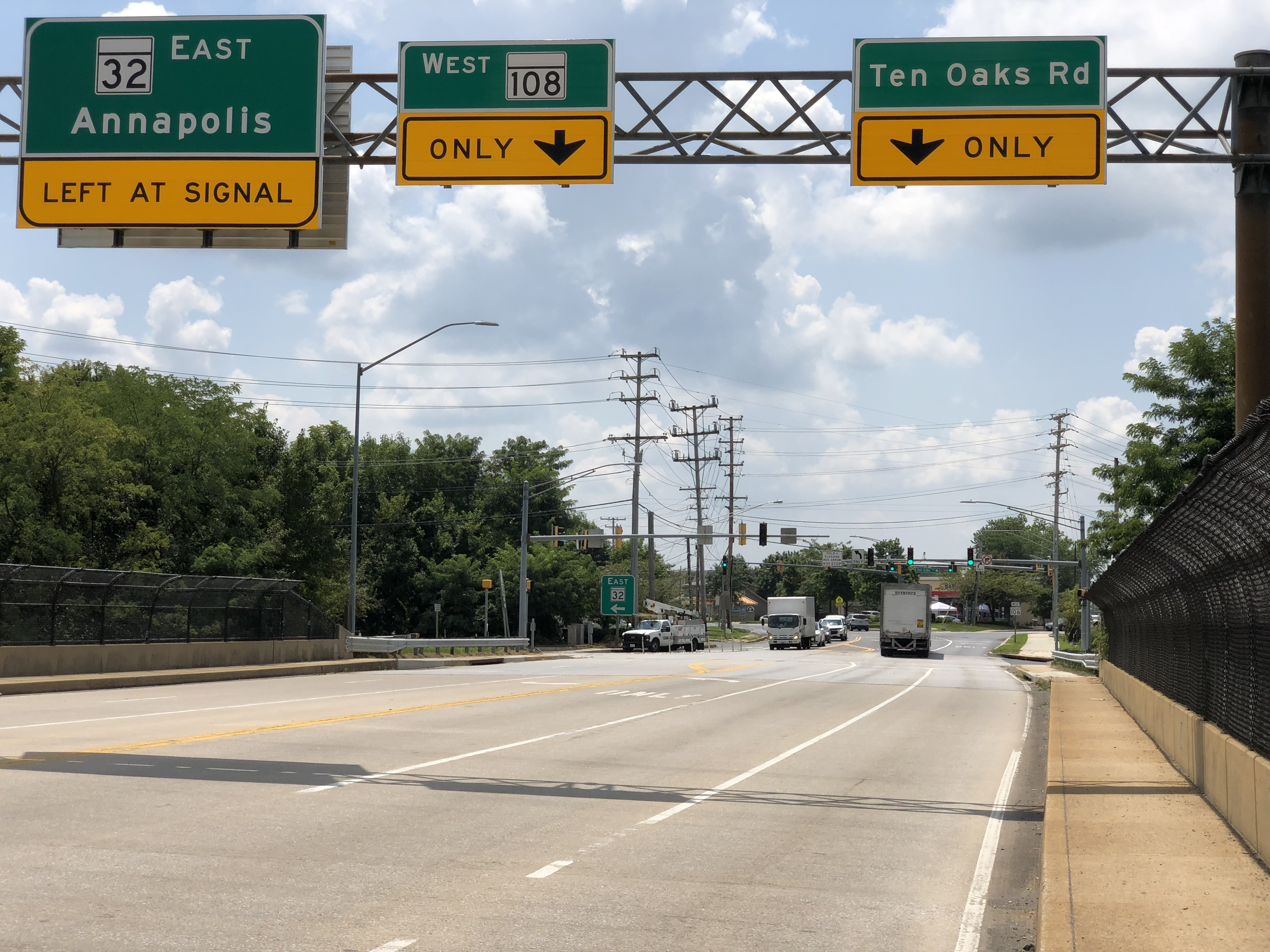
MD 108 westbound at MD 32 in Clarksville

MD 108 veers southeast out of Laytonsville and continues along Laytonsville Olney Road. The highway passes a pair of golf courses and the historic home Oaks II. MD 108 also passes near the historic homes The Ridge, via Muncaster Road, and Clover Hill, via Zion Road. The route expands to a four-lane divided highway at the western edge of Olney. In the center of the unincorporated suburb, MD 108 intersects MD 97 (Georgia Avenue) and its name changes to Olney Sandy Spring Road. The route continues southeast to the eastern edge of Olney, where the highway crosses James Creek and meets the northern end of MD 182 (Dr. Bird Road) next to Our Lady of Good Counsel High School and the Olney Theatre Center for the Arts. MD 108 veers northeast, drops to two lanes, and passes through the historic community of Sandy Spring, which is named for the nearby Sandy Spring Friends Meetinghouse. The highway gains a center left-turn lane and passes Sherwood High School before intersecting MD 650 (New Hampshire Avenue) in the village of Ashton.

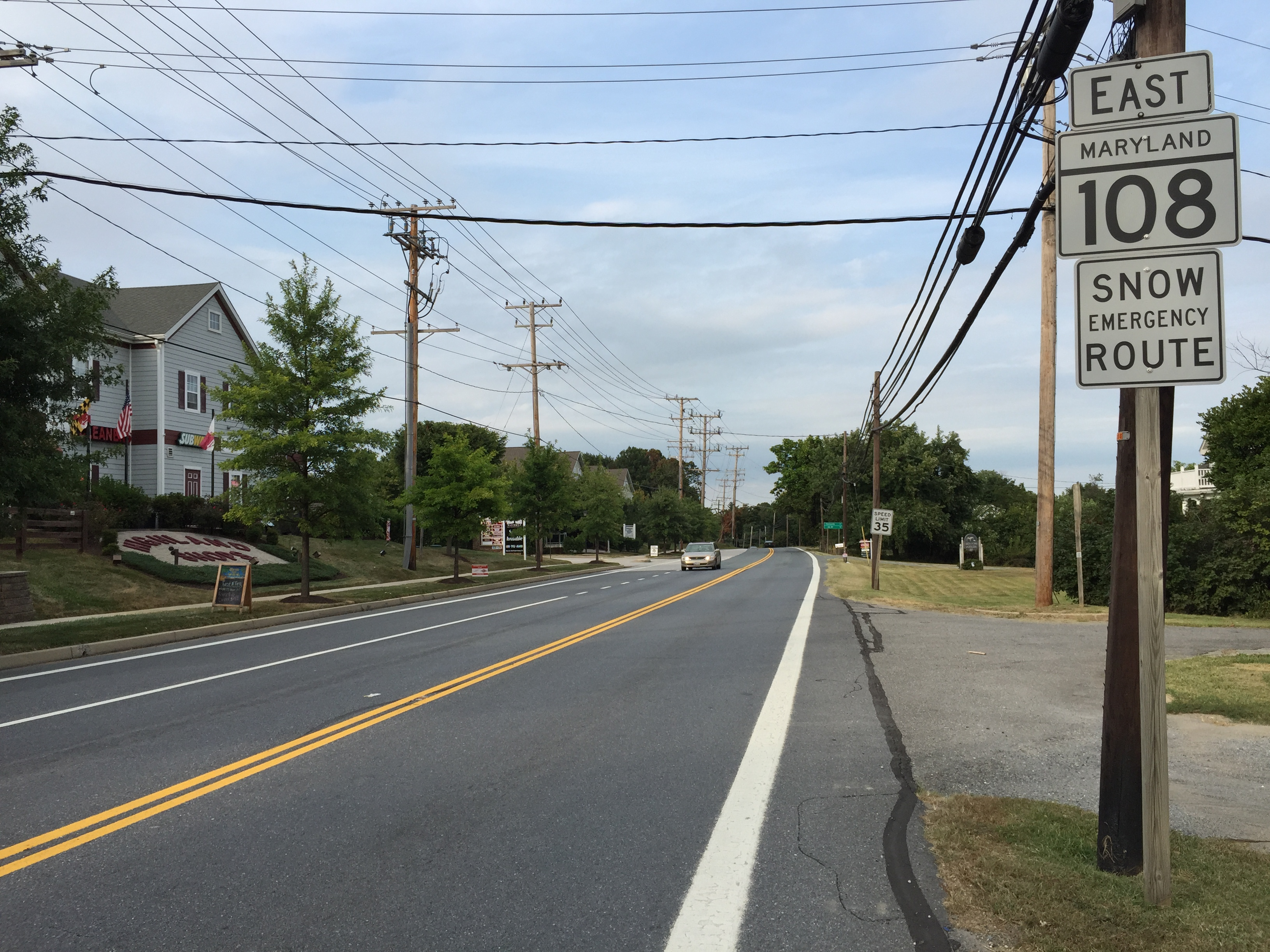
View east along MD 108 at MD 216 in Highland

MD 108 leaves Ashton as two-lane undivided Ashton Road, which the route follows to the Montgomery–Howard county line at the Patuxent River. The highway continues northeast as Clarksville Pike through the village of Highland, where it meets the western end of MD 216 (Scaggsville Road) and Highland Road. MD 108 continues through the village of Clarksville, where the highway intersects Guilford Road and Ten Oaks Road. Just north of the latter road, the highway expands to four lanes at its diamond interchange with MD 32, which heads east as the Patuxent Freeway and northwest as Sykesville Road. MD 108 gains a center left-turn lane as it begins to pass along the northern edge of the large, planned community of Columbia. The highway passes along the edge of the westernmost of Columbia's villages, River Hill. From here, the road reduces to two lanes, passing northwest of River Hill High School and crossing the Middle Patuxent River. MD 108 continues east along the northern edge of the villages of Harper's Choice and Wilde Lake; between the two, the route passes historic Clark's Elioak Farm.

MD 108 expands to a four-lane divided highway south of Lake Centennial and just west of its crossing of the Little Patuxent River in the village of Dorsey's Search. The route meets US 29 (Columbia Pike) at a cloverleaf interchange and curves southeast as Old Annapolis Road, passing northeast of a park and ride lot. MD 108 reduces to two lanes and passes along the northern edge of the Oakland Mills village. The highway passes Howard High School and has an interchange with eastbound MD 100. Access to westbound MD 100 is immediately to the east via MD 104 (Waterloo Road). MD 108 turns south onto Waterloo Road, passes the historic Curtis-Shipley Farmstead, and intersects Snowden River Parkway, which ends at its interchange with MD 100 to the east. The state highway continues south along the eastern edge of the village of Long Reach. South of Old Waterloo Road, MD 108 expands to four lanes and gains a median shortly before reaching its eastern terminus at MD 175 (Rouse Parkway) a short distance west of MD 175's interchange with Interstate 95 (I-95).

MD 108 is a part of the National Highway System as a principal arterial in three sections: from its western terminus at MD 27 in Damascus to Mullinix Mill Road; from Brookeville Road near Olney to MD 650 in Ashton; and from MD 216 at Highland to MD 32 in Clarksville.

== History ==
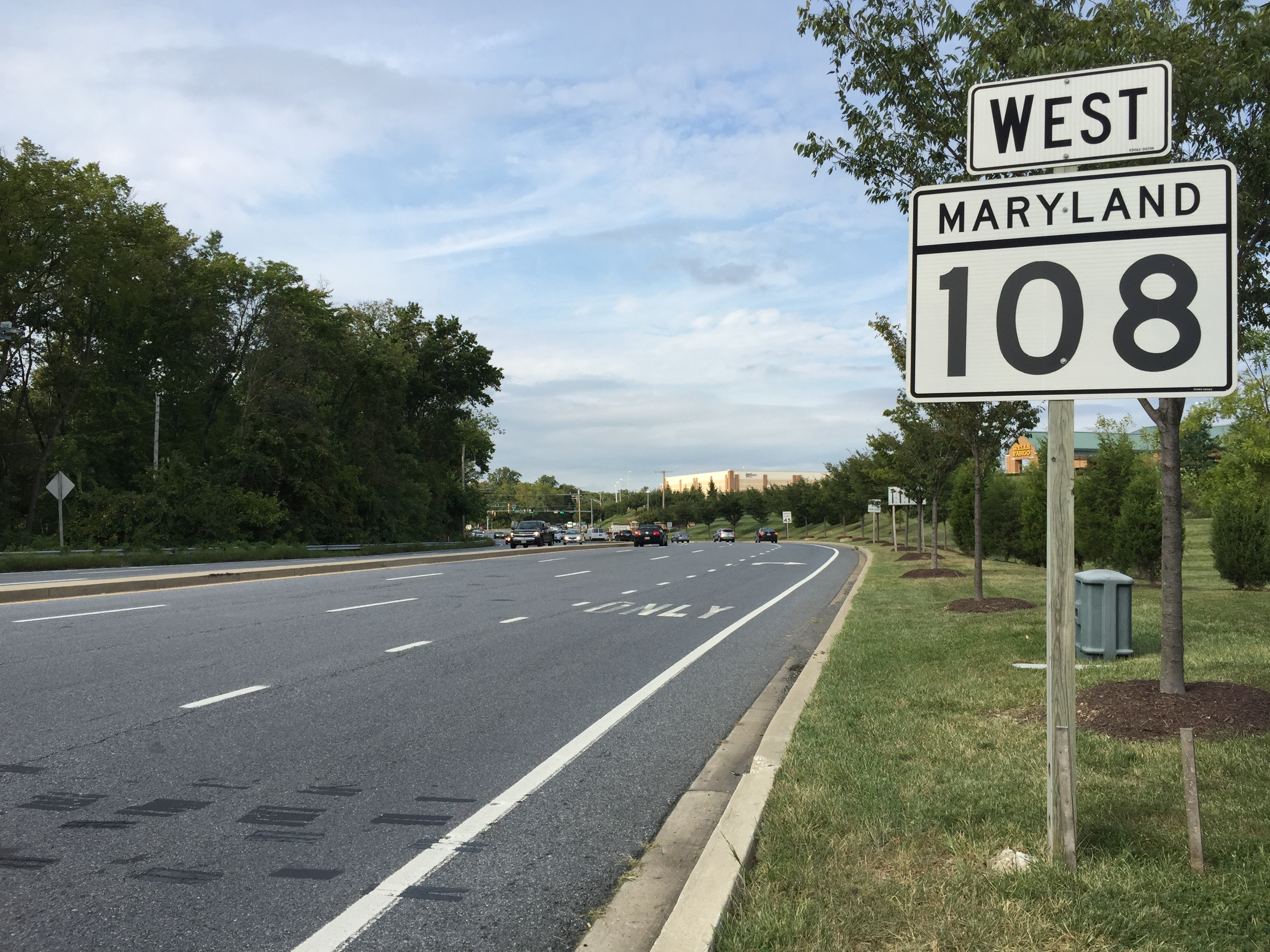
MD 108 westbound past its eastern terminus at MD 175 in Columbia

MD 108 originally extended from MD 27 in Damascus to MD 97 in Olney. Continuing east along what is today MD 108, as of 1939, route numbers assigned to the highway included MD 28 from Olney to Ashton; US 29 from Ashton to Columbia, which was then a hamlet at the site of the modern MD 108–US 29 interchange; a county highway from Columbia to Jonestown, a hamlet at the site of the modern MD 108–MD 104 intersection; and MD 531 from Jonestown to west of Waterloo, a village at the intersection of US 1 and MD 175. The US 29 segment was originally designated MD 27 in 1927; the original highway numbered MD 29 was what is today MD 27. When US 29 was extended into Maryland in 1934, the routes swapped numbers to their present designations. By 1946, MD 108 was extended east to Ashton when MD 28 was truncated at MD 97 at Norbeck. In addition, MD 531 was replaced by an extension of MD 175.

The first segment of MD 108 was built by Montgomery County with state aid from Brink Road south to Warfield Road in the town of Laytonsville by 1910. This segment was part of a macadam road from Laytonsville south toward Gaithersburg that later became part of MD 124. The next segment of MD 108 was a 0.5-mile (0.80 km) stretch of concrete road north from Brink Road in Laytonsville completed in 1923. Another piece of concrete road was built from the macadam road in Laytonsville southeast to Riggs Road at Claysville between 1925 and 1927. The concrete road on the north side of Laytonsville was extended north to near Etchison between 1926 and 1928. Another section of MD 108 was started from MD 29 in Damascus in 1927; the highway from Laytonsville to Damascus via Etchison was completed in 1929. In addition, the concrete road southeast from Laytonsville was extended to Brookeville Road and a new segment was constructed west from MD 97 to Bowie Mill Road in Olney. The final segment of MD 108 between Laytonsville and Olney was started in 1930 and completed by 1933.

The highway from Olney to Columbia was proposed as one of the original state highways by the Maryland State Roads Commission in 1909. The portion east of Clarksville was once part of a turnpike called the Ellicott City and Clarksville Turnpike; the portion of the turnpike from Ellicott City through Columbia to Cedar Lane at Elioak was resurfaced with macadam in 1914. Two portions of Clarksville Pike, from Snell's Bridge across the Patuxent River to Highland and a section north of Clarksville, were completed as 15-foot-wide (4.6 m) concrete roads in 1918. The gaps between Highland and Clarksville and at the Middle Patuxent River between Clarksville and Elioak were under construction as concrete roads in 1919 and finished by 1921. Three segments of macadam road were constructed along Clarksville Pike from Olney through Sandy Spring and Ashton to Snell's Bridge between 1916 and 1919. Clarksville Pike was widened with a pair of 3-foot-wide (0.91 m) concrete shoulders from Columbia to Elioak by 1927. The remainder of the highway to Olney was widened to a minimum width of 20 feet (6.1 m) by 1930. MD 108's modern bridge across the Patuxent River was built in 1934, replacing Snell's Bridge.

Maryland Route 539
- Location: Columbia
- Existed: 1956–1959

MD 531 was constructed as a macadam road from Waterloo to Jonestown in 1932. MD 175 was relocated, widened, and resurfaced along old MD 531 from Waterloo to Jonestown in 1954. Old Annapolis Road from Columbia to Jonestown was brought into the state highway system as MD 539 in 1956. The new Columbia Pike from Columbia south to White Oak was complete in 1958 but did not become part of US 29 until 1960. Old US 29 from White Oak to Ashton was renumbered MD 650; MD 108 was extended east along old US 29 from Ashton to Columbia and along MD 539 to MD 175 at Jonestown. MD 175 was relocated to its and MD 108's present divided highway west of I-95 in 1969 in conjunction with the construction of the I-95–MD 175 interchange between then and 1971. When MD 175 was relocated to its present alignment through Columbia in 1977, MD 108 was extended along old MD 175 to its present eastern terminus. MD 108 was expanded to a four-lane divided highway on either side of US 29 in conjunction with the construction of the interchange in 1987 and 1988. The state highway was expanded to a four-lane divided highway through Olney in 1994. MD 108's interchange with MD 32 was built in 1996. MD 108 was later widened at its intersection at Centennial Lane and Beaverbrook Road from the middle of 2021 to early 2023.

== Junction list ==
County	Location	mi	km	Destinations	Notes
Montgomery	Damascus	0.00	0.00	MD 27 (Ridge Road) – Mount Airy, Germantown	Western terminus
Montgomery	Damascus	0.15	0.24	MD 124 south (Woodfield Road) – Gaithersburg	Northern terminus of MD 124
Montgomery	Etchison	4.44	7.15	MD 650 south (Damascus Road) – Ashton	Northern terminus of MD 650
Montgomery	Olney	13.36	21.50	MD 97 (Georgia Avenue) – Silver Spring, Cooksville	
Montgomery	Sandy Spring	14.79	23.80	MD 182 south (Dr. Bird Road) – Norwood	Northern terminus of MD 182
Montgomery	Ashton	16.57	26.67	MD 650 (New Hampshire Avenue) – Colesville	
Howard	Highland	20.52	33.02	MD 216 east (Scaggsville Road) – Fulton	Western terminus of MD 216
Howard	Clarksville	22.73	36.58	MD 32 (Patuxent Freeway/Sykesville Road) – Sykesville, Annapolis	MD 32 Exit 20
Howard	Columbia	29.19	46.98	US 29 (Columbia Pike) – Columbia Town Center, Baltimore	US 29 Exit 21
Howard	Columbia	31.23	50.26	MD 100 east – Glen Burnie	MD 100 Exit 2; exit from and entrance to eastbound MD 100
Howard	Columbia	31.34	50.44	MD 104 north (Waterloo Road) to MD 100 west – Ellicott City	Southern terminus of MD 104; MD 108 turns south onto Waterloo Road
Howard	Columbia	34.23	55.09	MD 175 (Rouse Parkway) to I-95 – Jessup, Columbia Town Center	Eastern terminus
1.000 mi = 1.609 km; 1.000 km = 0.621 mi: Incomplete access

== Auxiliary routes ==
MD 108 has two auxiliary routes:

- MD 108A is the designation for Thomas Williams Way, a 0.12-mile (0.19 km) service road from a dead end east to MD 981 (Tricross Drive) at the MD 108–MD 104 intersection. The service road provides access to several homes and two churches. Prior to 2013, MD 108A extended to MD 108.
- MD 108H is the designation for Presbyterian Circle, a 0.22-mile (0.35 km) service road from MD 108 west to a dead end adjacent to the MD 108–US 29 interchange. The service road provides access to a church and a park-and-ride.

== See also ==
- MD 103
