= Snell's Bridge =

- Coordinates: 39.162444°N 76.97365°W
- Carries: Route 108, Ashton Road
- Crosses: Patuxent River

Characteristics
- Material: Concrete
- Total length: 123
- Width: 27'2"
- No. of spans: 85

History
- Constructed by: State Roads Commission
- Construction end: 1928

Snell's Bridge is an historic bridge over the Patuxent River on the road between present-day Highland, Maryland and Ashton, Maryland. Farms surrounding the bridge were surveyed as early as 1720. In 1777, George Snell was considered the owner of the bridge by Montgomery County with George Darby listed as the road overseer. In November 1787, the State of Maryland funded a fifty-foot wide road to be built from Snell's Bridge and Greens Bridge upstream to Ellicott's Mills. Richard Green, Nathanial Owen, and John Ellicott were appointed commissioners for the project.

The land next to the bridge is the birthplace of the Whig Major who ordered the Peggy Stuart burned.

During the British invasion of the War of 1812, American troops led by William H. Winder retreated east across Snell's Bridge on August 26, 1814. The President stayed at Brookville, with the disorganized troops gathering at the bridge for the night. After camping overnight at the bridge, the General concluded that he should proceed directly to Baltimore in case the British were advancing northward leaving Brigadier General Stansbury in charge of the troops at camp. The British were at the same time leaving Washington, and boarded ships to sail the Potomac and Chesapeake toward Baltimore.

In the 1840s, the state funded a replacement to Snell's Bridge.

The modern bridge is a concrete arch built in 1928 along with the widening of route 108 in Howard County. The bridge replacement was funded via the 1920 Lateral and Post Roads Act. A historical survey was conducted in 1995 without mention of the bridge's role in the War of 1812.

== See also ==
- Governor's Bridge (Patuxent River)
