= Rocky Gorge Reservoir =

Maryland reservoir on the Patuxent River

- T. Howard Duckett Reservoir
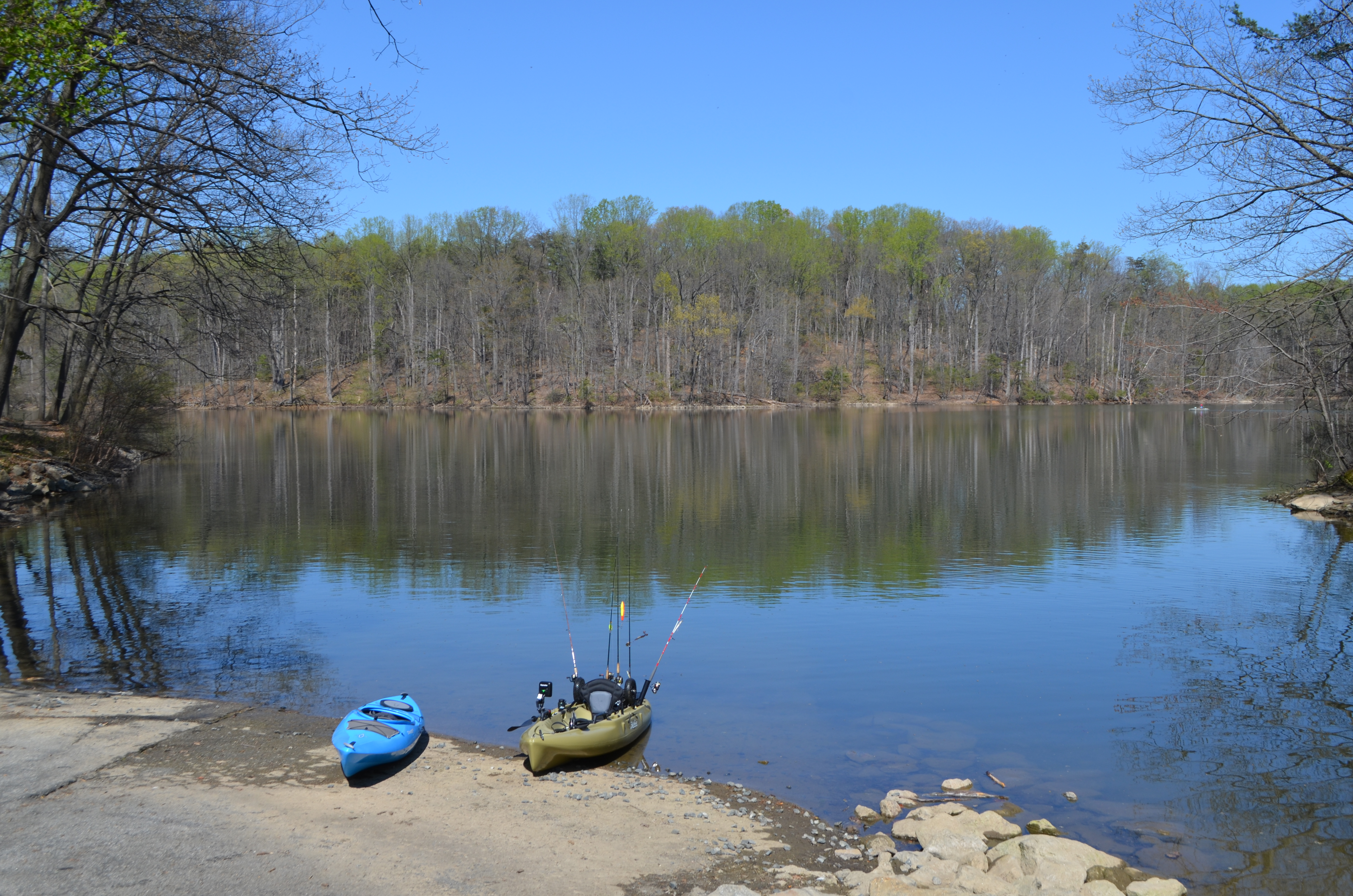

- Location within Maryland Location within the United States
- Location: Burtonsville, Maryland Laurel, Maryland
- Coordinates: 39°07′29″N 76°54′22″W
- Type: reservoir
- Primary inflows: Patuxent River
- Primary outflows: Patuxent River
- Catchment area: 132 mi^{2} (340 km^{2})
- Basin countries: United States
- Surface area: 773 acres (313 ha)
- Average depth: 74 ft (23 m)
- Water volume: 5,500,000,000 US gal (0.021 km^{3})
- Surface elevation: 266 ft (81 m)

Rocky Gorge Reservoir is located on the Patuxent River in Howard, Montgomery, and Prince George's counties in Maryland, between Laurel and Burtonsville. The reservoir was created in 1952 by the construction of the T. Howard Duckett Dam on the Patuxent. The dam is visible from Interstate 95 near milemarker 34. Because of its close association with a dam by the name, the reservoir is sometimes called the T. Howard Duckett Reservoir. It has a surface area of 773 acres (313 ha). The reservoir is maintained as a drinking water source by the Washington Suburban Sanitary Commission (WSSC).

WSSC provides recreational facilities to the public on portions of the Rocky Gorge property, including hiking, picnicking, fishing, boating, horseback riding, and hunting. Local fish species include pike and largemouth bass.

== Namesake ==
T. Howard Duckett drafted the law officially establishing the WSSC as a permanent bicounty agency. Following lobbying by E. Brooke Lee, the law was passed, effective May 1, 1918. Duckett was named one of the three first official commissioners.

== See also ==
- Triadelphia Reservoir
