= Oaks II =

Historic house in Maryland, United States

- U.S. National Register of Historic Places
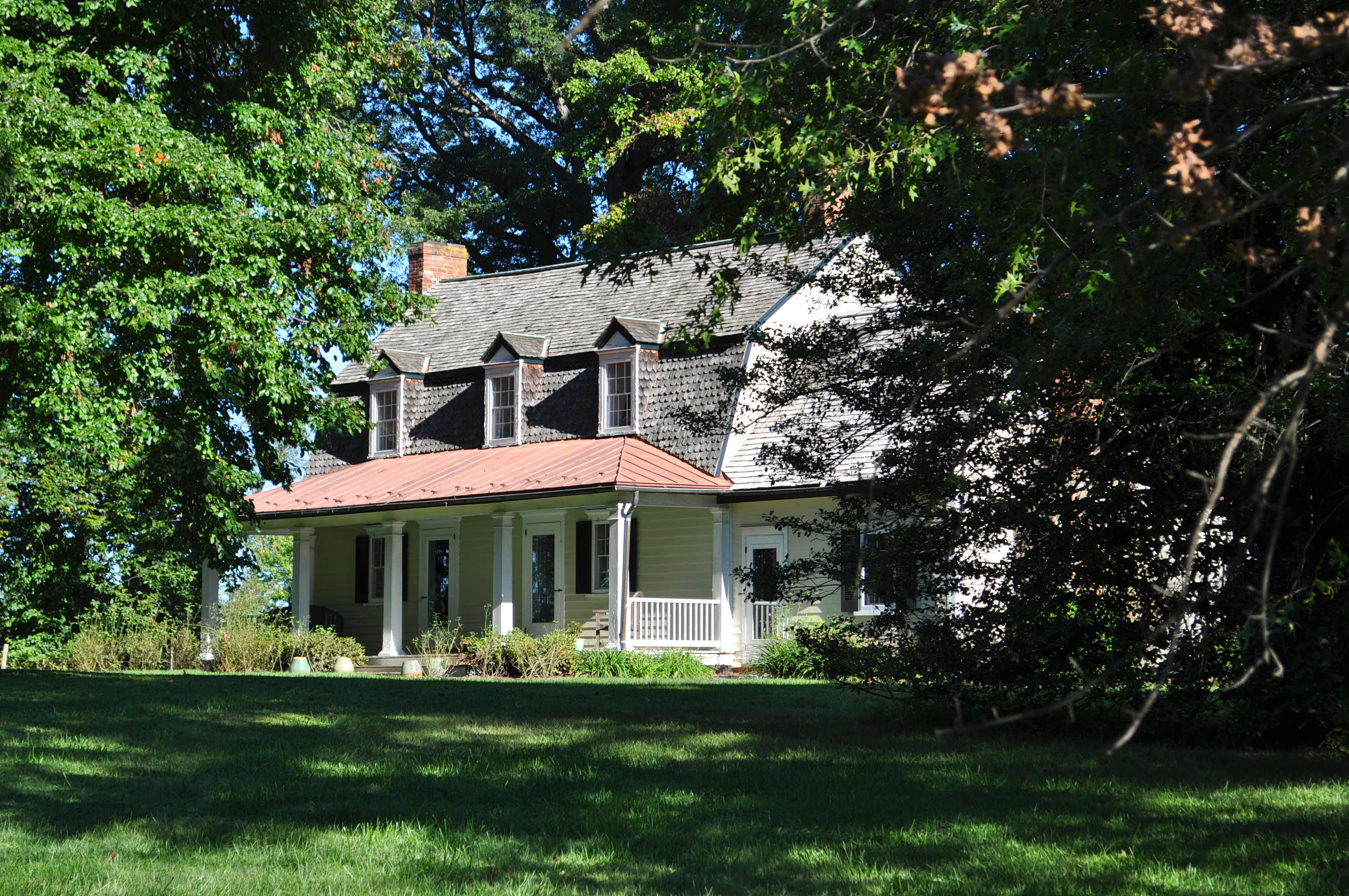
- The Oaks II, September 2012

- Location within Maryland Location within the United States
- Location: 5815 Riggs Rd., Laytonsville, Maryland
- Coordinates: 39°11′50″N 77°7′24″W
- Area: 5 acres (2.0 ha)
- Built: 1797
- NRHP reference No.: 82001598
- Added to NRHP: November 30, 1982

The Oaks II is a historic home located at Laytonsville, Montgomery County, Maryland, United States. It was built between 1797 and 1814, and is a 1 1/2-story gambrel-roofed log house with an adjoining one-story gable-roofed log addition. A number of outbuildings which stood on the original Riggs Farm with this house were moved to the current location on the west side of the road. The house is significant for its 133-year association with the Riggs family, a prominent Montgomery County family active in civic and agricultural affairs of both the county and the state.

Oaks II was listed on the National Register of Historic Places in 1982.
