= New Hampshire Avenue =

Diagonal street in Washington, D.C.

- New Hampshire Avenue NE; New Hampshire Avenue NW
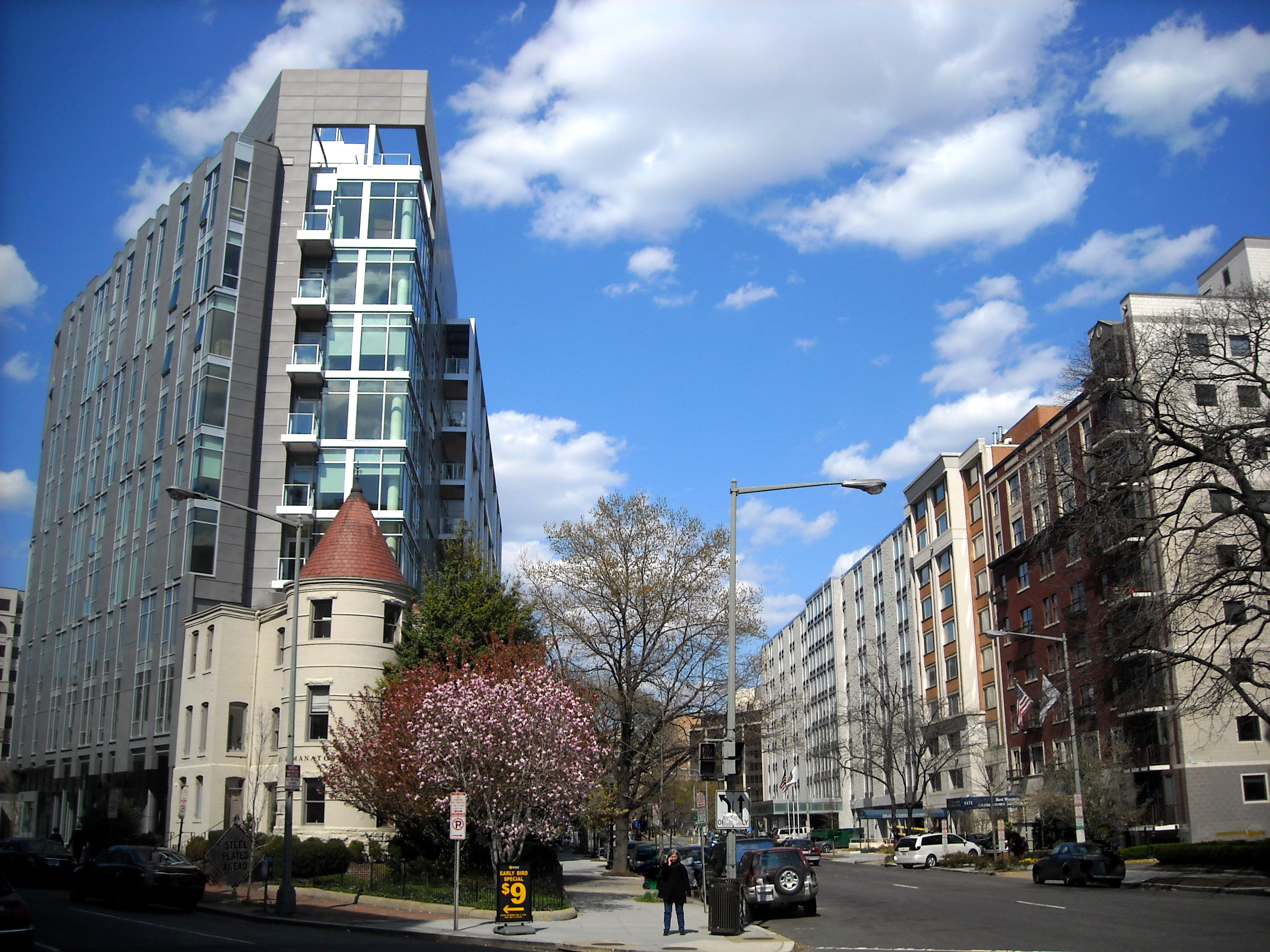
- Intersection of 22nd Street and New Hampshire Avenue, NW in the West End neighborhood
- Interactive map of New Hampshire Avenue
- Namesake: The State of New Hampshire
- Maintained by: DDOT
- Location: Washington, D.C., U.S.
- Coordinates: 38°57′43.5″N 77°0′18.5″W
- South end: Watergate Complex
- Major junctions: Virginia Avenue; US 29 / Washington Circle; Dupont Circle; US 29 (Georgia Avenue); Grant Circle; North Capitol Street
- North end: MD 650 / Eastern Avenue

Construction
- Commissioned: 1907
- Construction start: 1908

New Hampshire Avenue is a diagonal avenue in Washington, D.C., beginning at the Kennedy Center and extending northeast for about 5 miles (8 km) and then continuing into Maryland, where it is designated Maryland Route 650. New Hampshire Avenue is not contiguous. It stops at 15th and W Streets NW, and resumes again on the other side of Columbia Heights at Park Road NW, a few blocks from Georgia Avenue.

New Hampshire Avenue passes through several Washington neighborhoods including Foggy Bottom, Dupont Circle, Petworth and Lamond-Riggs.

In Maryland, New Hampshire Avenue passes the neighborhoods and towns of Chillum, Takoma Park, Carole Highlands, Langley Park and Silver Spring. It eventually feeds into Damascus Road (Maryland Route 108) at Etchison. Many Maryland residents regard New Hampshire Avenue as a convenient access road to Washington's North Capitol Street, a wide road that starts north of the U.S. Capitol and divides the city into its northwest and northeast quadrants.

== History ==
In 1907, the commissioners of the District of Columbia asked Congress to appropriate funds to extend New Hampshire Avenue northward to the Maryland state line. The northern portion was proposed in 1908.

Rock Creek Church requested that New Hampshire Avenue not be extended in a straight line in order to be more direct to the church. Thomas H. Carter of Montana and Jacob H. Gallinger of New Hampshire submitted the bill to the Senate. The bill passed in late 1908.

In 1911, the commissioners of the District asked Congress to appropriate funds to extend New Hampshire Avenue in a deflected direction, rather than in a straight line, from its end at Buchanan Avenue to the Maryland state line.

The House of Representatives passed the bill, and the Senate passed it soon thereafter.

== Transit service ==
While no single transit route follows New Hampshire Avenue for very long, it nonetheless runs in proximity of and briefly carries an assortment of transit services.

=== Metrobus ===
The following Metrobus routes run along the avenue (listed from south to north):

- H1, L1 (20th St. NW to Washington Circle)
- L2 (18th St. NW to 21st St. NW)
- 64 (Missouri Ave. to Park Rd.)
- 63 (Georgia Ave. to Park Rd.)
- H8 (Georgia Ave. to Park Rd.)
- K6 (White Oak to Fort Totten)
- K9 (Limited-stop service from the DC-Maryland Border to Mahan Rd.)
- R1 (Northbound only from Metzerott Rd. to Adelphi Rd.)
- C8 (Randolph Rd. to Adelphi Rd.)
- Z2 (Olney-Sandy Spring Rd. to Lockwood Dr.)

=== Ride On ===
The following Ride On routes run along the avenue in Montgomery County, Maryland (listed from south to north):

- 16 (Ruatan St. to Ethan Allen Ave.)
- 20, 24 (Schindler Dr. to Northampton Dr., and Southampton Dr. to Piney Branch Rd.)
- 10 (Lockwood Dr. to Powder Mill Rd.)
- 21 (Wolf Dr. to Columbia Pike)

=== Metrorail ===
The following Metrorail stations have stops located near New Hampshire Avenue:

- Foggy Bottom–GWU
  Blue Line
  Silver Line
  Orange Line
- Dupont Circle
  Red Line
- Georgia Avenue–Petworth
  Green Line
