= Ashton, Maryland =

Unincorporated area in Montgomery County, Maryland, United States

Coordinates: 39°8′57.47″N 77°0′44.33″W

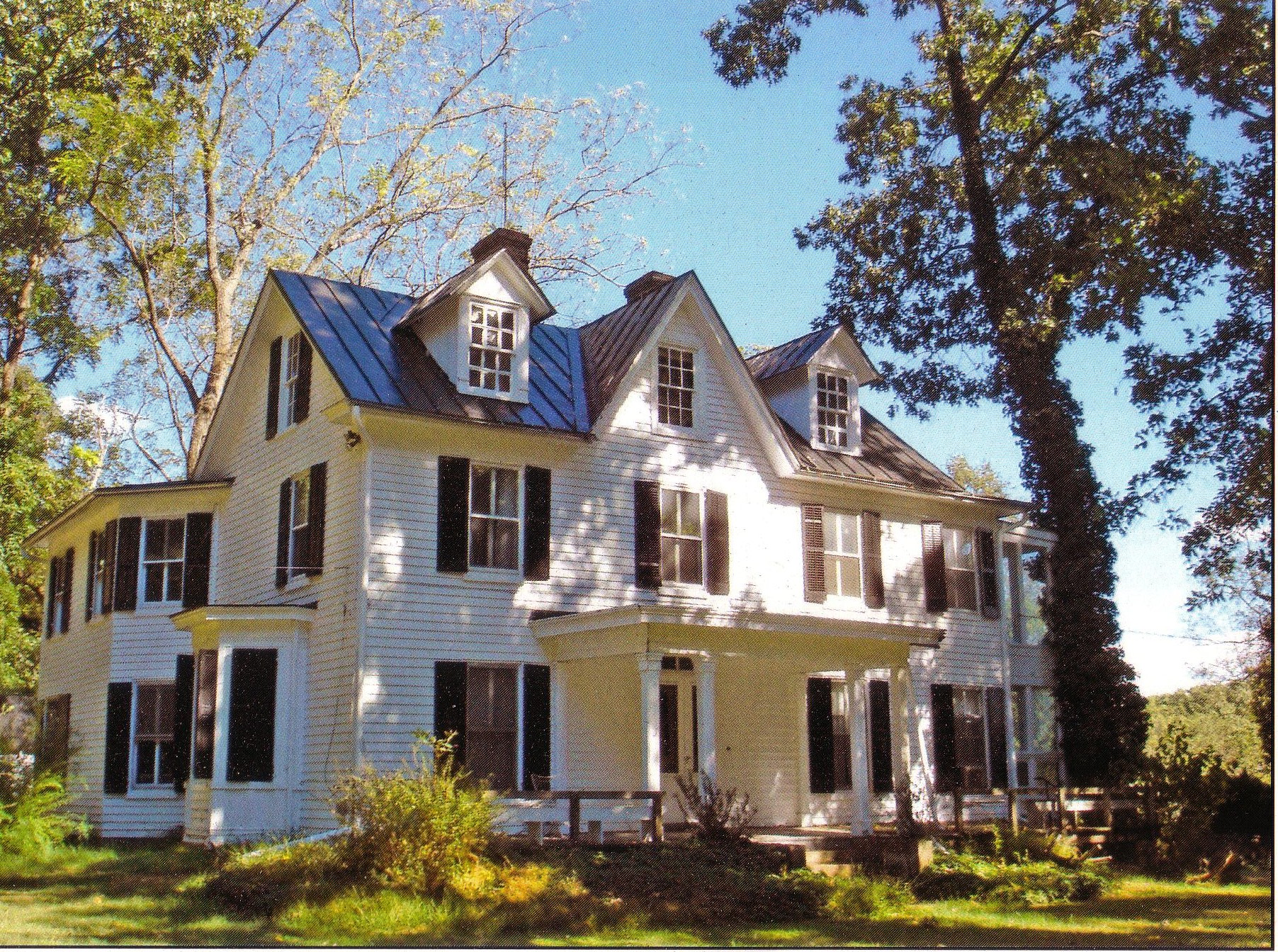
A home in Ashton

Ashton is an unincorporated community in Montgomery County, Maryland, United States. The commercial center of Ashton lies at the junction of Route 108 (Ashton Road) and New Hampshire Avenue (Route 650). The etymology of Ashton is unclear, as some longtime residents claim that it comes from reference to a large ash tree that stood at the junction of routes 108 and 650. Others have stated that it is a portmanteau of the names of two Thomas family homes, Ashland and Clifton, each located one mile from the junction.

The United States Census Bureau combines Ashton with the nearby community of Sandy Spring to form the census-designated place of Ashton-Sandy Spring, and all census data are tabulated for this combined entity.

== Development ==
The "Ashton Master Plan" (1998) contains a vision "to preserve the character of Sandy Spring/Ashton as an historic rural community." However, this goal is in conflict with the trend towards development of the area. The plan itself notes that "reliance on a zoning strategy that permitted large-lot, low-density development pattern and clustering around the village centers has not been as effective in maintaining the rural character, as originally envisioned." In 2020, significant development efforts have begun pursuant to the Ashton Village Center Sector Plan.

Several projects are underway: (see Development Projects in Montgomery County, MD)

- CVS Ashton (2014) - complete
- Ashton Market (2019) - in progress
- Olive Branch Community Church - in progress
