= Brinklow, Maryland =

Unincorporated community in Maryland, United States

- Unincorporated community
- Location within Maryland
- Coordinates: 39°09′57″N 77°00′56″W
- Country: United States
- State: Maryland
- County: Montgomery
- Elevation: 459 ft (140 m)
- Time zone: UTC-5 (Eastern (EST))
  - Summer (DST): UTC-4 (EDT)
- ZIP code: 20862
- Area codes: 240 & 301
- GNIS feature ID: 588624

Brinklow is an unincorporated community in Montgomery County, Maryland, United States. Brinklow is located on Maryland Route 650, 3 miles (4.8 km) northeast of Olney. Brinklow's ZIP code is 20862. It is located within the Ashton-Sandy Spring census-designated place for statistical purposes.

The community was named by Hallie Lea, a storekeeper in the late 1880s, most likely for Brinklow in Warwickshire, England.
