= Etchison, Maryland =

Etchison
- Unincorporated community
- Location within Maryland
- Coordinates: 39.2548°N 77.1437°W
- Country: United States
- State: Maryland
- County: Montgomery
- Elevation: 636 ft (194 m)

Etchison is an unincorporated community in Montgomery County, Maryland in the United States of America. It is on Maryland Route 108 at its junction with the northern end of Maryland Route 650.
