= Damascus, Maryland =

- Census-designated place
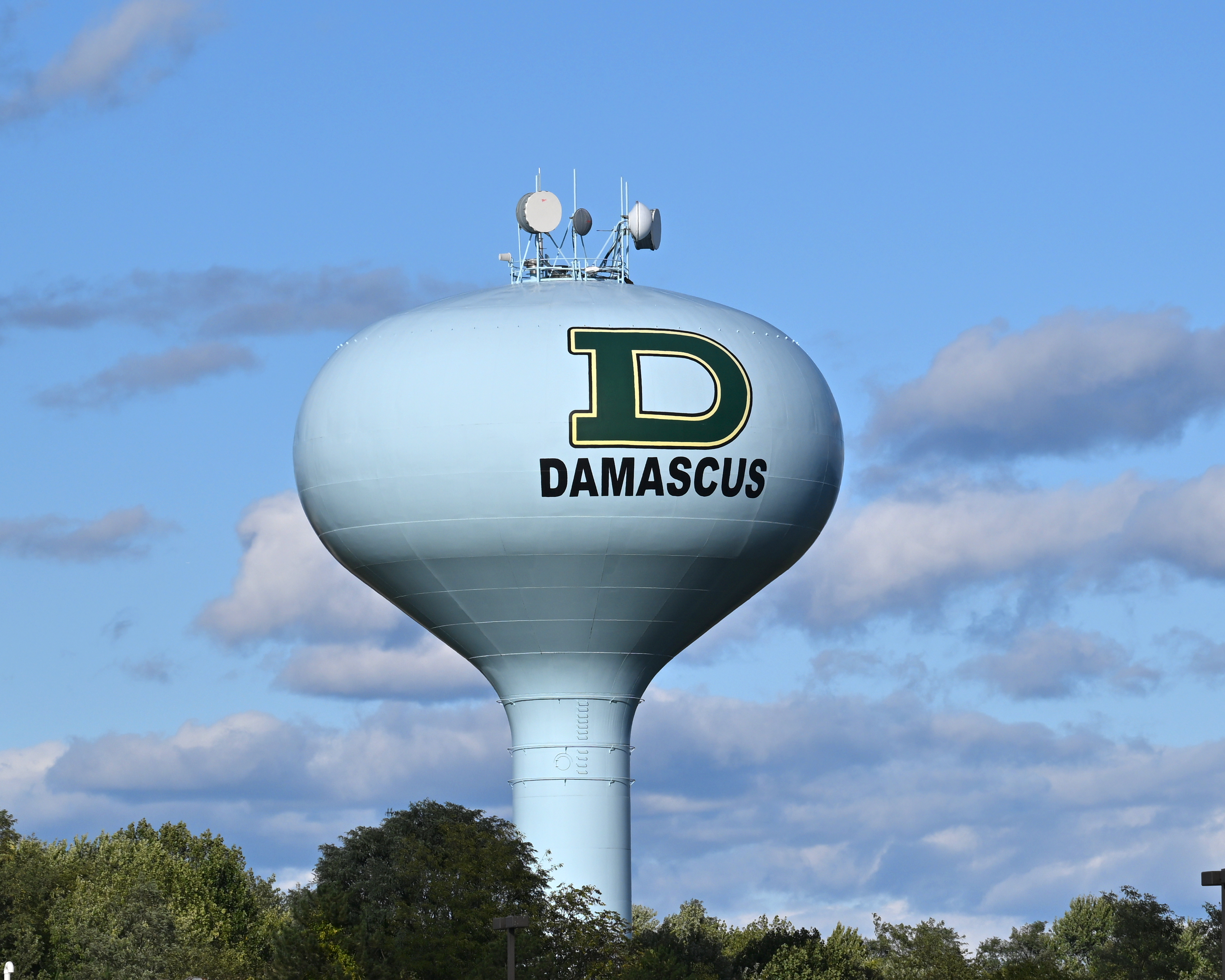

- Location of Damascus, Maryland
- Coordinates: 39°17′15.6″N 77°12′6.1″W
- Country: United States
- State: Maryland
- County: Montgomery
- Named for: Damascus, Syria

Area
  - Total: 14.27 sq mi (36.95 km^{2})
  - Land: 14.24 sq mi (36.89 km^{2})
  - Water: 0.023 sq mi (0.06 km^{2})
- Elevation: 712 ft (217 m)

Population (2020)
  - Total: 17,224
  - Density: 1,209.3/sq mi (466.92/km^{2})
- Time zone: UTC−5 (Eastern (EST))
  - Summer (DST): UTC−4 (EDT)
- ZIP code: 20872
- Area codes: 301, 240
- FIPS code: 24-21475
- GNIS feature ID: 2389391

Damascus is a census-designated place and an unincorporated area in Montgomery County, Maryland, United States. In the early 20th century, there existed an incorporated municipality lasting a quarter century. It had a population of 17,224 as of the 2020 census. Damascus is located at the intersection of three major roads in upper Montgomery County: Ridge Road (currently Rt. 27), Damascus Road (currently Rt. 108) and Woodfield Road (currently Rt. 124).

== Name ==
The name was first used in an official document in 1816, when the United States Congress approved a postal route through the area, operated by Edward Hughes.

== History ==
The area currently known as Damascus was granted by the new U.S. state of Maryland to Nathaniel Pigman in 1783. On February 14, 1819, War of 1812 veteran Edward Hughes bought a 40-acre (160,000 m^{2}) section of the grant and began subdividing lots for sale. James Madison, the fourth U.S. president, appointed Hughes postmaster of the developing community of Damascus in 1816. Hughes received permission from Congress for a postal route through the town. Hughes called his town "The Pleasant Plains of Damascus". A newspaper in Frederick wrote of Hughes's growing town: "There is at this place an extensive opening for mechanics of all the different kinds, and it bids fair to improve very fast; ... There is at present two blacksmith shops, a saddler's shop and a store in the place -- a tailor, a wheel wright, and a shoemaker are much wanted, and would meet with great encouragement." This was the Damascus of 1816. The new township drew settlers from Anne Arundel County as well as from Montgomery County. On September 12, 1862, U.S. Army troops marched through the "village" of Damascus via what is now Route 27 on their way to the town of Sharpsburg, where they engaged Confederate troops commanded by General Robert E. Lee at the Battle of Antietam.

The town was incorporated from 1890 until 1914, when the townspeople requested the incorporation be withdrawn so that Old Quaker Road, used since Revolutionary times and before, could be paved into a state highway. The town remains a commercial center for rural communities like Clagettsville, Browningsville, Cedar Grove, Woodfield, King's Valley, Purdum, and Lewisdale, although it is more developed today.

In spite of spiraling population growth and encroaching urban development, old-timers feel like Damascus retains its rural, small-town character. The Damascus Community Fair—a fully agricultural fair that has been in operation since 1940—attracts thousands of visitors annually in the first weekend of September. 4-H clubs and equestrian centers have retained their popularity in the area.

November 17, 2009, marked the grand opening of the Damascus Heritage Society Museum.

Damascus was Maryland's last dry town until 2013, when townspeople passed a bill by referendum to allow the sale of beer and wine.

In 2017, Damascus parents and teachers raised funds to paint the town's water tower with the green-and-gold "D" logo displayed on the high school football helmets, as a way to honor the prestigious football team and turn the formerly plain-looking tower into an iconic town landmark. The tower can be seen from all around Damascus, and from the high school football field. Initially, the organizers painted it with the school's Swarmin' Hornet mascot, but Georgia Tech did not allow them to because of its similarity to their trademarked yellow-jacket logo and they were forced to alter the design.

== Geography ==
As an unincorporated area, Damascus' boundaries are not officially defined. Damascus is recognized by the United States Census Bureau as a census-designated place, and by the United States Geological Survey as a populated place located. Damascus proper is a locally high spot at 847 ft (258m) above sea level, while other portions of the area described as Damascus are as high as 866 ft (264m) above sea level. Due to a quirk in the layout of Montgomery County, the highest elevation in the county is actually within what is considered Mt. Airy, MD, measuring 883 ft (269m) above sea level at the Full Gospel Church. This peak just southwest of Mt. Airy is actually the highest elevation in the immediately adjacent Washington D.C. suburbs and is located inside an often overlooked strip of Montgomery County which is approximately 1 mile (1.6 km) long and of varying width, generally a few hundred feet (~100 M) wide. While the Full Gospel Church building is within Montgomery County, the driveways are in Frederick County and portions of the parking lot are in Howard County.

Damascus is west of the fall line between the Piedmont of Appalachia and the Atlantic coastal plain. Damascus is known for its rural landscape and family-owned farms. According to the United States Census Bureau, the place has a total area of 9.6 square miles (25 km^{2}), all land. 34

The town is located on Parr's Ridge, a low shale ridge that rises about 300 feet above the surrounding Piedmont. Open hilltops in the area afford picturesque vistas of the Appalachian Mountains to the southwest, west, and northwest. These ridges include Sugarloaf Mountain and South Mountain, MD, Catoctin Mountain, in MD and PA, and the Blue Ridge of VA. On very clear days, two 4,000 foot plus peaks in the Shenandoah National Park of VA can be seen 75 miles to the southwest.

=== Climate ===
The climate in this area is characterized by warm, humid summers and generally cool winters. According to the Köppen Climate Classification system, Damascus has a humid subtropical climate, abbreviated "Cfa" on climate maps.

Due to its higher elevation, rural landscape, and northernmost location in Montgomery County, its 32-inch average snowfall is the highest in the county and the immediately adjacent Washington D.C. suburbs. In the record-breaking winter of 2009–2010, 98.4 inches of snow fell and a maximum depth of 37 inches was recorded, the greatest snow depth in the area's history. Occasionally intense blizzards fed by coastal waters can paralyze the area. In average winters, snow-covered ground comes and goes. In severe winters, ponds may stay frozen and the ground will remain snow-covered for a month or two.

Rainfall is usually plentiful and well distributed throughout the year. In an average year, about 46 inches is recorded. Thunderstorms are quite common during June to August. Sometimes they produce hail and damaging winds, but tornadoes are rare.

Temperatures are moderate. January's average monthly temperature is 31 °F, and July's is 74 °F. Occasionally, frigid Arctic outbreaks from Canada can drive minimum temperatures below 0 °F (−18 °C) for a morning or two. During the summer months, heat waves can produce a week or two of 90 °F or higher afternoon days. Summer morning temperatures are usually pleasant, averaging in the mid-60s.

Climate data for Damascus, Maryland, 1991–2020 normals, extremes 1973–present
Month	Jan	Feb	Mar	Apr	May	Jun	Jul	Aug	Sep	Oct	Nov	Dec	Year
Record high °F (°C)	73 (23)	78 (26)	86 (30)	91 (33)	93 (34)	97 (36)	101 (38)	102 (39)	97 (36)	90 (32)	81 (27)	75 (24)	102 (39)
Mean maximum °F (°C)	61.3 (16.3)	63.3 (17.4)	73.8 (23.2)	83.7 (28.7)	88.1 (31.2)	90.9 (32.7)	93.2 (34.0)	91.7 (33.2)	87.8 (31.0)	80.2 (26.8)	71.4 (21.9)	62.6 (17.0)	93.0 (33.9)
Mean daily maximum °F (°C)	39.1 (3.9)	42.6 (5.9)	51.6 (10.9)	63.9 (17.7)	72.5 (22.5)	80.2 (26.8)	84.3 (29.1)	82.6 (28.1)	75.7 (24.3)	64.5 (18.1)	53.3 (11.8)	43.5 (6.4)	62.8 (17.1)
Daily mean °F (°C)	31.8 (−0.1)	34.4 (1.3)	42.4 (5.8)	53.4 (11.9)	62.6 (17.0)	70.9 (21.6)	75.1 (23.9)	73.6 (23.1)	66.7 (19.3)	55.5 (13.1)	44.9 (7.2)	36.5 (2.5)	54.0 (12.2)
Mean daily minimum °F (°C)	24.5 (−4.2)	26.1 (−3.3)	33.1 (0.6)	42.9 (6.1)	52.8 (11.6)	61.5 (16.4)	66.0 (18.9)	64.6 (18.1)	57.6 (14.2)	46.5 (8.1)	36.4 (2.4)	29.5 (−1.4)	45.1 (7.3)
Mean minimum °F (°C)	5.4 (−14.8)	9.9 (−12.3)	16.0 (−8.9)	28.1 (−2.2)	36.7 (2.6)	47.4 (8.6)	55.3 (12.9)	53.4 (11.9)	43.1 (6.2)	31.3 (−0.4)	21.9 (−5.6)	14.3 (−9.8)	3.8 (−15.7)
Record low °F (°C)	−12 (−24)	−9 (−23)	3 (−16)	18 (−8)	28 (−2)	38 (3)	45 (7)	41 (5)	35 (2)	21 (−6)	9 (−13)	−5 (−21)	−12 (−24)
Average precipitation inches (mm)	3.41 (87)	2.98 (76)	4.04 (103)	3.62 (92)	4.35 (110)	4.67 (119)	4.49 (114)	4.18 (106)	4.76 (121)	4.01 (102)	3.49 (89)	3.89 (99)	47.89 (1,218)
Average snowfall inches (cm)	9.4 (24)	11.1 (28)	4.8 (12)	0.2 (0.51)	0.0 (0.0)	0.0 (0.0)	0.0 (0.0)	0.0 (0.0)	0.0 (0.0)	0.0 (0.0)	0.8 (2.0)	5.1 (13)	31.4 (79.51)
Average extreme snow depth inches (cm)	6.5 (17)	7.2 (18)	3.0 (7.6)	0.1 (0.25)	0.0 (0.0)	0.0 (0.0)	0.0 (0.0)	0.0 (0.0)	0.0 (0.0)	0.0 (0.0)	0.4 (1.0)	2.9 (7.4)	11.5 (29)
Average precipitation days (≥ 0.01 in)	10.4	9.8	10.1	11.1	11.4	11.1	9.8	9.5	9.0	8.8	8.2	10.0	119.2
Average snowy days (≥ 0.1 in)	5.3	4.7	2.5	0.3	0.0	0.0	0.0	0.0	0.0	0.0	0.6	2.9	16.3
Source: NOAA

== Demographics ==
Historical population
Census	Pop.	Note	%±
2000	11,430		—
2010	15,257		33.5%
2020	17,224		12.9%
U.S. Decennial Census; 2000–2020

=== Racial and ethnic composition ===
Damascus CDP, Maryland – Racial and ethnic composition Note: the US Census treats Hispanic/Latino as an ethnic category. This table excludes Latinos from the racial categories and assigns them to a separate category. Hispanics/Latinos may be of any race.
Race / Ethnicity (NH = Non-Hispanic)	Pop 2000	Pop 2010	Pop 2020	% 2000	% 2010	% 2020
White alone (NH)	9,959	11,020	10,353	87.13%	72.23%	60.11%
Black or African American alone (NH)	518	1,172	1,648	4.53%	7.68%	9.57%
Native American or Alaska Native alone (NH)	17	32	35	0.15%	0.21%	0.20%
Asian alone (NH)	252	855	1,116	2.20%	5.60%	6.48%
Native Hawaiian or Pacific Islander alone (NH)	2	8	2	0.02%	0.05%	0.01%
Other race alone (NH)	11	24	124	0.10%	0.16%	0.72%
Mixed race or Multiracial (NH)	178	377	878	1.56%	2.47%	5.10%
Hispanic or Latino (any race)	493	1,769	3,068	4.31%	11.59%	17.81%
Total	11,430	15,257	17,224	100.00%	100.00%	100.00%

=== 2020 census ===
As of the 2020 census, Damascus had a population of 17,224. The median age was 39.4 years. 24.7% of residents were under the age of 18 and 12.7% of residents were 65 years of age or older. For every 100 females there were 95.6 males, and for every 100 females age 18 and over there were 92.9 males age 18 and over.

89.9% of residents lived in urban areas, while 10.1% lived in rural areas.

There were 5,696 households in Damascus, of which 38.8% had children under the age of 18 living in them. Of all households, 65.5% were married-couple households, 11.5% were households with a male householder and no spouse or partner present, and 18.6% were households with a female householder and no spouse or partner present. About 13.6% of all households were made up of individuals and 5.4% had someone living alone who was 65 years of age or older.

There were 5,866 housing units, of which 2.9% were vacant. The homeowner vacancy rate was 0.9% and the rental vacancy rate was 6.1%.

Racial composition as of the 2020 census
Race	Number	Percent
White	10,822	62.8%
Black or African American	1,697	9.9%
American Indian and Alaska Native	102	0.6%
Asian	1,129	6.6%
Native Hawaiian and Other Pacific Islander	4	0.0%
Some other race	1,396	8.1%
Two or more races	2,074	12.0%

=== 2000 census ===
As of the 2000 census, there were 11,430 people, 3,710 households, and 3,079 families residing in the area. The population density was 1,187.5 inhabitants per square mile (458.5/km^{2}). There were 3,773 housing units at an average density of 392.0 per square mile (151.4/km^{2}). The ethnic makeup of the area was 89.66% white, 6.63% African American, 0.24% Native American, 2.21% Asian, 0.03% Pacific Islander, 1.28% from other races, and 1.95% from two or more races. Hispanic or Latino of any race were 4.31% of the population.

There were 3,710 households, of which 52.7% had children under the age of 18 living with them, 68.0% were married couples living together, 11.3% had a female householder with no husband present, and 17.0% were non-families. 13.1% of all households were made up of individuals, and 3.3% had someone living alone who was 65 years of age or older. The average household size was 3.08 and the average family size was 3.38.

There are 34.0% of the population under the age of 18, 6.0% from 18 to 24, 33.6% from 25 to 44, 21.1% from 45 to 64, and 5.3% who were 65 years of age or older. The median age was 34 years. For every 100 females, there were 94.1 males. For every 100 females age 18 and over, there were 91.6 males.

The median income for a household in the community was $71,447, and the median income for a family was $76,462. Males had a median income of $51,590 versus $38,731 for females. The per capita income for the area was $26,659. About 4.2% of families and 5.3% of the population were below the poverty line, including 6.8% of those under age 18 and 0.9% of those age 65 or over.

== Education and athletics ==
Damascus High School (DHS) is well-known regionally and nationally for its championship athletic teams, known as the Swarmin' Hornets. DHS is one of the few remaining schools in the state to still hold its graduation ceremonies on the school's football field. A rite of passage for many graduating seniors is to walk on the field and receive their diploma not only in front of family and friends in the stands, but also the several hundred townspeople who gather outside the fences to watch the ceremony. In the case of inclement weather, the graduation ceremony is held in the high school's auditorium.

Former U.S. Secretary of State and former Chairman of the Joint Chiefs of Staff General Colin Powell was the speaker for Damascus High School's Class of 2000 commencement ceremony at the high school's football stadium. Billy Ripken, brother of Oriole baseball player Cal Ripken Jr., was the speaker for the 2013 commencement, which also took place at the Damascus High School football stadium.

== Civic groups ==
The American Legion is active in the community. Since Damascus Post 171 was founded after World War II, it has engaged in charitable and civic endeavors, ranging from installing Christmas decorations downtown to sponsoring high school scholarships. Post 171 is host to annual ceremonies commemorating Memorial Day and Veterans Day on the grounds of the Post home. Post 171 also sponsors an American Junior Legion baseball team, which is a perennial champion.

Montgomery County Fire & Rescue Company 13, with headquarters in Damascus, is one of the oldest companies in the Montgomery County fire service. Originating in 1944 as an all-volunteer force, the Damascus Volunteer Fire Department-Company 13 transitioned to a mix of full-time professionals and volunteers since the late 1980s. A new firehouse was constructed in 1993. Today, the company is responsible for a fast growing residential and downtown area in and around Damascus.

== Notable people ==
- Christian M. M. Brady (1968–), theological scholar and current president of Wittenberg University
- Bryan Bresee (2001–), NFL player
- Meshach Browning (c. 1781–1859), early American pioneer, hunter and explorer
- Jake Funk (1998–), NFL player and Super Bowl LVI champion
- Michael Jurgens (2000–), NFL player
- Nick Noble (1984–), professional soccer player
- Joel Ross (1992–), CFL player
- Brian Stelter (1985–), political commentator
- Kevin Thompson (1977–), NFL player
- Joe Tippett (1982–), actor
