= Carroll Avenue bridge =

The Carroll Avenue bridge may be:

- Kinzie Street railroad bridge in Chicago
- Carroll Avenue bridge (Maryland), part of Maryland Route 195

== See also ==
- Carroll Street Bridge
