= Maryland Route 594 =

State highway in Maryland, United States

Maryland Route 594
- Wayne Avenue
- Collection of MD 594's routes highlighted in red and magenta

Route information
- Maintained by MDSHA
- Length: 1.40 mi (2.25 km)
- Existed: 2016–present

Major junctions
- West end: US 29 in Silver Spring
- East end: Flower Avenue in Silver Spring

Location
- Country: United States
- State: Maryland
- Counties: Montgomery

Highway system
- Maryland highway system; Interstate; US; State; Scenic Byways
| ← MD 591 | → I-595 |

Maryland Route 594 (MD 594) is a state highway in the U.S. state of Maryland. Known as Wayne Avenue, the highway runs 1.40 miles (2.25 km) from U.S. Route 29 (US 29) east to Flower Avenue within Silver Spring in southeastern Montgomery County. This segment is part of a collection of four auxiliary routes designated as MD 594 in the Silver Spring area. Wayne Avenue is designated MD 594A, while the three other auxiliary routes are designated MD 594B, MD 594C, and MD 594D. MD 594A, MD 594B, MD 594C, and MD 594D were transferred to the state from Montgomery County in 2016. MD 594E and MD 594F, which were located in Prince George's County, were transferred to the state from the county in 2017. In 2019, MD 594E and MD 594F were renumbered to MD 431 and MD 433 respectively.

== Route description ==
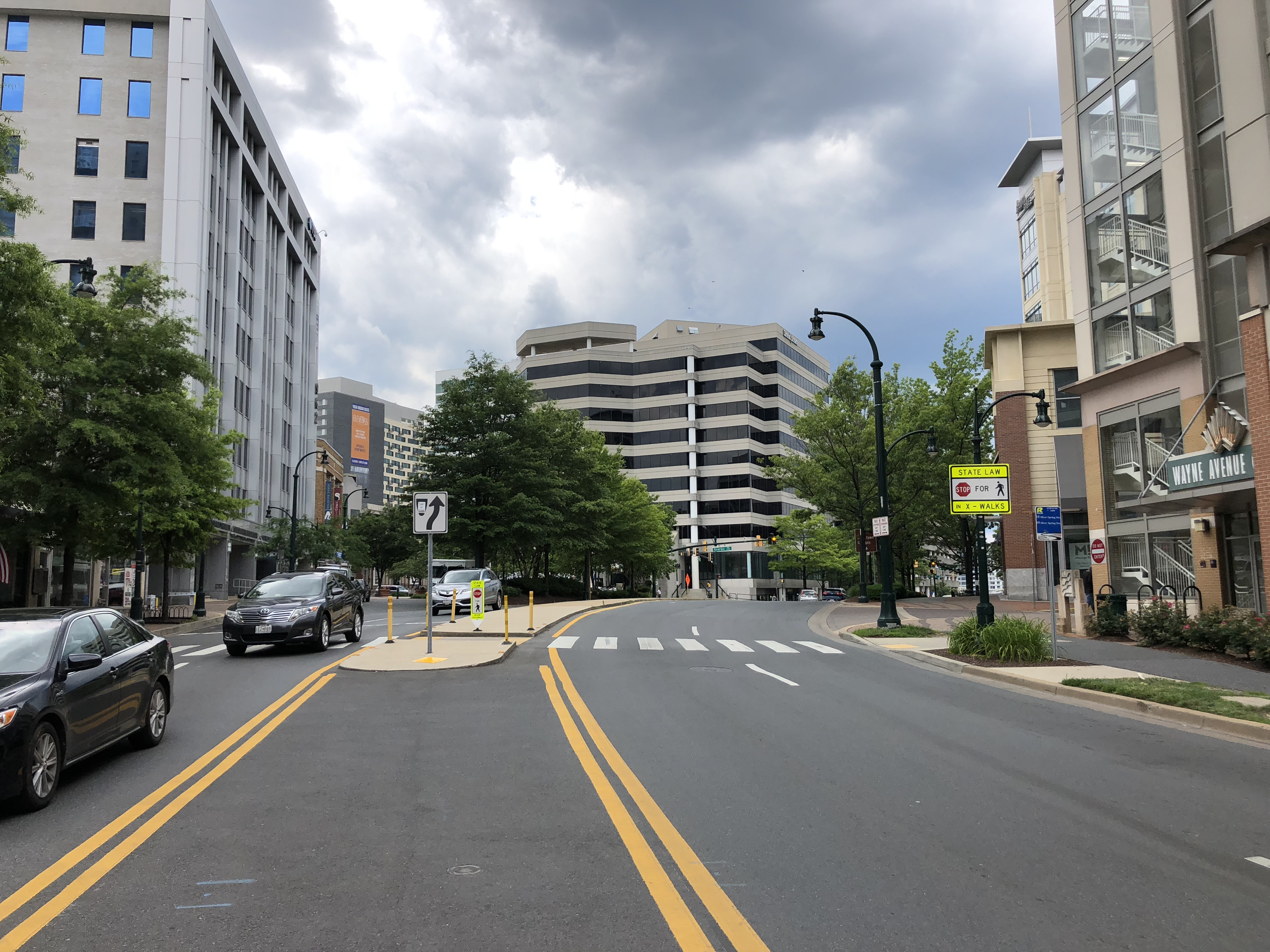
View west approaching the west end of MD 594A at US 29 in Silver Spring

MD 594A begins at the intersection of US 29 (Georgia Avenue) and Wayne Avenue in downtown Silver Spring in Montgomery County. Wayne Avenue continues west as a county highway toward the Silver Spring station, which serves MARC's Brunswick Line and Washington Metro's Red Line, and MD 384 (Colesville Road). MD 594A heads northeast as a four-lane divided highway to Fenton Street, where the highway passes the Brigadier General Charles E. McGee Library. The highway continues east as a four-lane undivided highway out of downtown Silver Spring. MD 594A descends into the valley of Sligo Creek and intersects Dale Drive, at the corner of which the highway passes Silver Spring International Middle School, which inhabits the former campus of Montgomery Blair High School. The highway intersects Sligo Creek Parkway immediately after it crosses Sligo Creek. MD 594A ascends from the stream valley as a two-lane street to its eastern terminus at Flower Avenue. Wayne Avenue continues east to a dead end at Long Branch, a tributary of Sligo Creek.

== History ==
MD 594A, MD 594B, MD 594C, and MD 594D were transferred to the state from Montgomery County on March 15, 2016. MD 594E and MD 594F were transferred to the state from Prince George's County in an agreement dated May 11, 2017. On August 27, 2019, MD 594E and MD 594F were renumbered to MD 431 and MD 433 respectively per the request of Maryland State Highway Administration District 3.

== Junction list ==
The entire route is in Silver Spring, Montgomery County.

| mi | km | Destinations | Notes |
|---|---|---|---|
| 0.00 | 0.00 | US 29 (Georgia Avenue) / Wayne Avenue west | Western terminus |
| 1.02 | 1.64 | Sligo Creek Parkway | |
| 1.40 | 2.25 | Flower Avenue / Wayne Avenue east | Eastern terminus |
1.000 mi = 1.609 km; 1.000 km = 0.621 mi

== Auxiliary routes ==
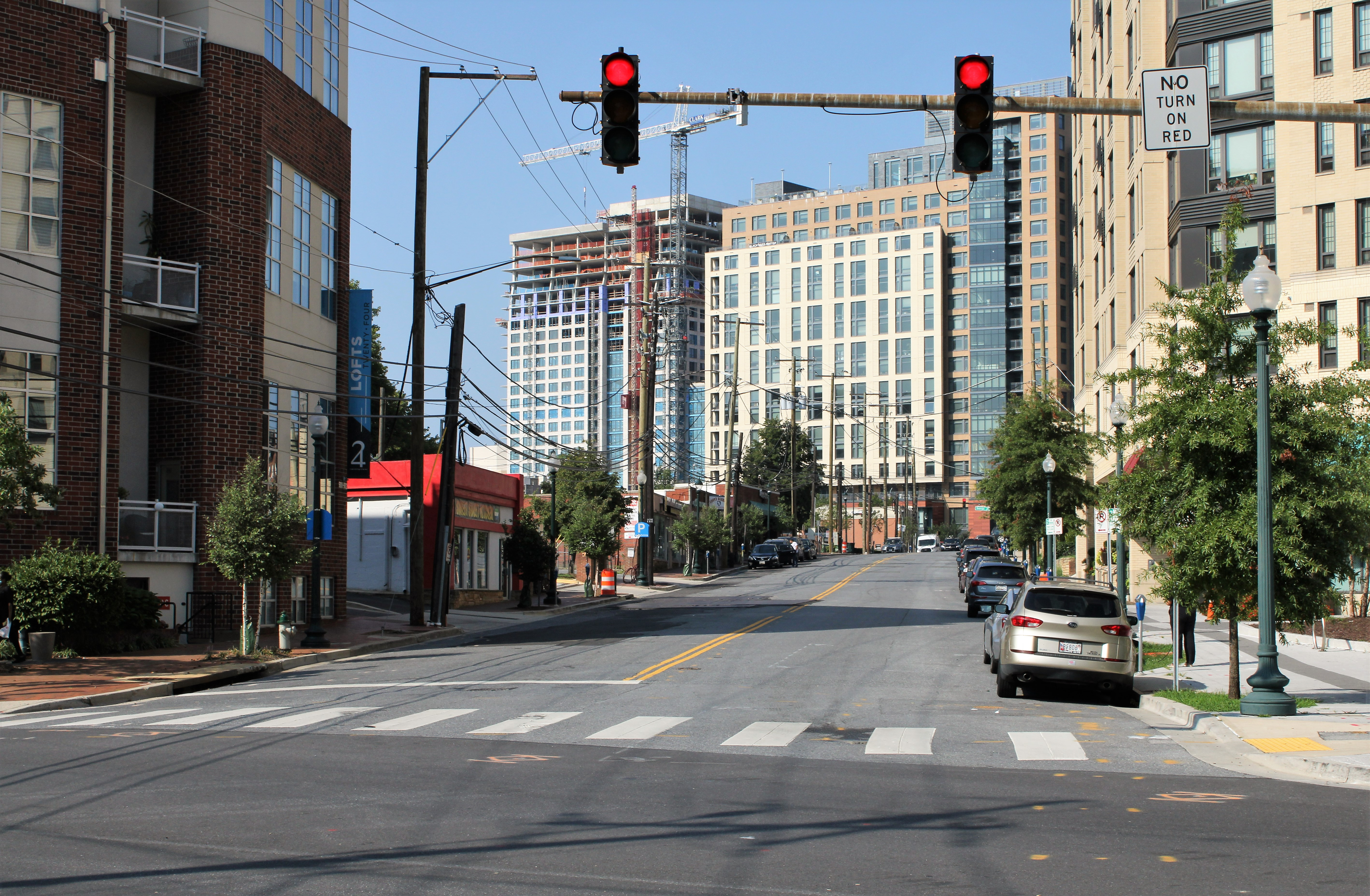
MD 594C (Bonifant Street)

MD 594 has three auxiliary routes located in Montgomery County.

- MD 594B is the designation for the 0.13-mile-long (0.21 km) section of Bonifant Street from Ramsey Avenue, which borders the Silver Spring Transit Center, to US 29 (Georgia Avenue) in downtown Silver Spring.
- MD 594C is the designation for the 0.16-mile-long (0.26 km) section of Bonifant Street from US 29 to Fenton Street on the opposite side of the Silver Spring Library from Wayne Avenue in downtown Silver Spring. Bonifant Street continues east as a county-maintained street.
- MD 594D is the designation for Arliss Street, which runs 0.27 miles (0.43 km) from Flower Avenue south of its intersection with Wayne Avenue east and south to MD 320 (Piney Branch Road).
