= Davis-Warner House =

Historic house in Maryland, United States

- U.S. National Register of Historic Places
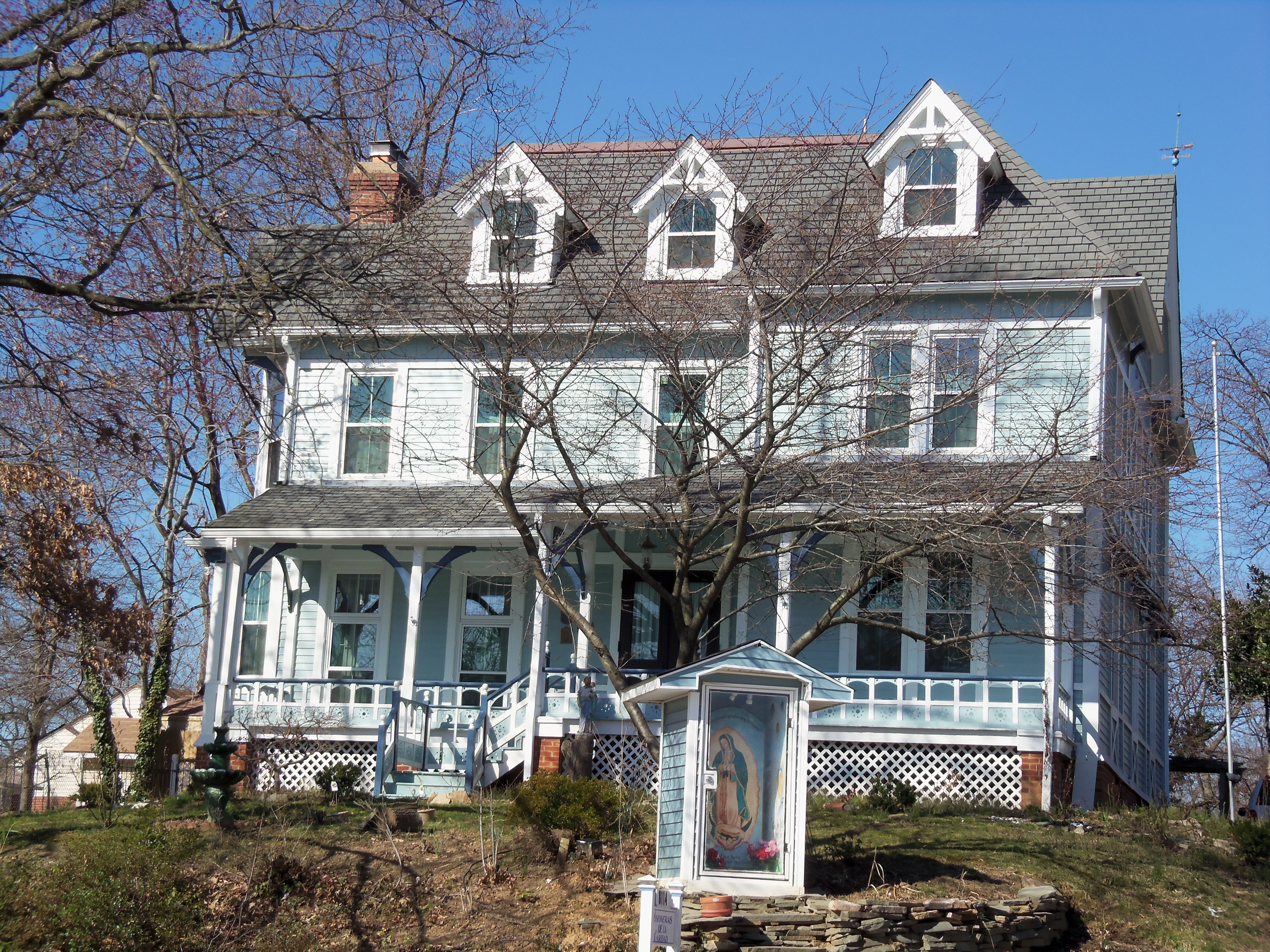

- Location within Maryland Location within the United States
- Location: 8114 Carroll Avenue, Takoma Park, Maryland
- Coordinates: 38°59′26″N 76°59′38″W
- Area: less than one acre
- Built: 1875
- Architectural style: Stick/eastlake
- NRHP reference No.: 01001335
- Added to NRHP: 2001-12-07

Davis-Warner House is an historic home at 8114 Carroll Avenue in Silver Spring, Montgomery County, Maryland. Built about 1875, it is one of the oldest residences around Takoma Park. It is a large, three-story frame Queen Anne-style residence, one of the only surviving Stick–Eastlake-style houses left in the Washington, D.C., area. It was built by John B. and Vorlinda Davis, who operated a small store on nearby Old Bladensburg Road (today's University Boulevard).

== History ==
In the early 20th century, it was used as a gambling hall and speakeasy, then from 1940 until 1987, it housed the private Cynthia Warner School, serving thousands of children of Takoma Park families from elementary through high school. In 1987, the property was purchased by the Church of Jesus Christ of Latter-day Saints. The Church began demolition of the building, but in 1991, Mark and Kira Davis purchased a half-acre section of the plot from the Church, and moved the house 150 meters to a new foundation, out of the way of the Church's construction plans, to preserve it.

The Davis family restored the building as a residence and office space. Kira operated her PaperFaces business, an art studio and customized paper doll business, while Mark operated an international trade law firm Davis & Leiman PC. In 1997, the Davises sold the property to Douglas A. Harbit and Robert F. Patenaude, who operated a bed and breakfast called The Davis-Warner Inn. They also qualified the property for registry with the National Register of Historic Places, and ceded development rights to the property in perpetuity to Historic Takoma, a local historic preservation society. Harbit and Patenaude coined the name "Davis-Warner House" to honor the Davis family that originally built the house, the Davis family that moved and restored the house, and Cynthia Warner, who operated the private school for much of the 20th century.

It was listed on the National Register of Historic Places in 2001.

The Davis-Warner Inn closed in 2006, and in 2010 the building was purchased out of foreclosure by the Missionaries of Charity, who repainted it Marian blue and operated it as a convent.

In 2015, the Davis-Warner Inn was purchased by local architect Eric Saul and his wife Diana Simpson for use as their primary residence.
