= Maryland Route 390 =

Highway in Montgomery County, Maryland, United States

Maryland Route 390
- 16th Street
- Maryland Route 390 highlighted in red

Route information
- Maintained by MDSHA
- Length: 1.09 mi (1.75 km)
- Existed: 1960–present

Major junctions
- South end: 16th Street at the District of Columbia boundary in Silver Spring
- MD 384 in Silver Spring; MD 410 in Silver Spring
- North end: MD 97 in Silver Spring

Location
- Country: United States
- State: Maryland
- Counties: Montgomery

Highway system
- Maryland highway system; Interstate; US; State; Scenic Byways
← MD 388	→ MD 392

Maryland Route 390 (MD 390) is a state highway in the U.S. state of Maryland. The highway runs 1.09 miles (1.75 km) from 16th Street at the District of Columbia boundary north to MD 97 within Silver Spring. MD 390 is a six-lane divided highway continuation of 16th Street into Maryland and serves as a western bypass of downtown Silver Spring. The portion of the highway south of MD 410 was constructed around 1930. MD 390 was extended north to MD 97 as a divided highway in the late 1950s.

== Route description ==
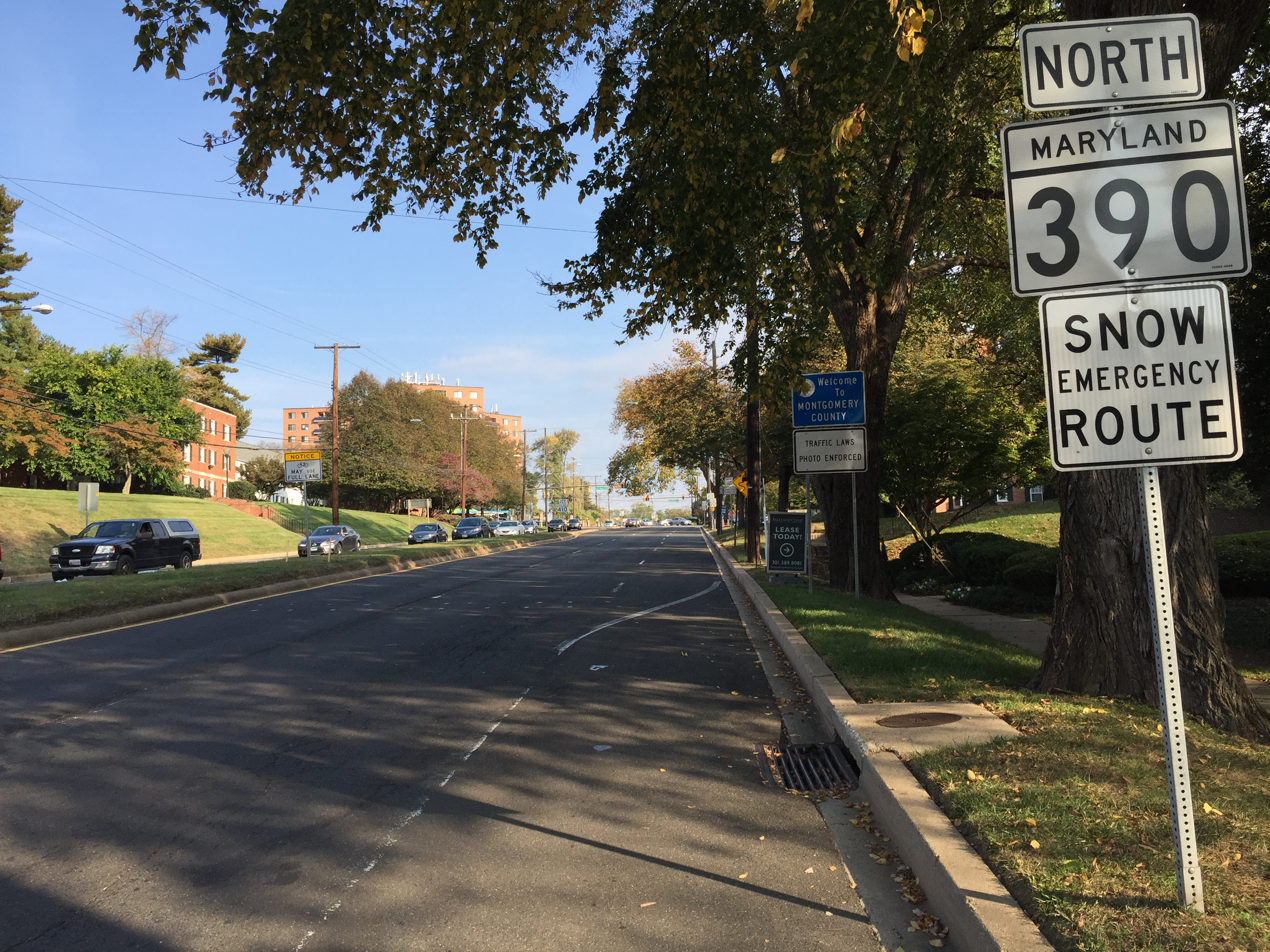
View north at the south end of MD 390 at the Blair Portal traffic circle at the District of Columbia boundary in Silver Spring

MD 390 begins at Blair Portal traffic circle at the boundary between the District of Columbia and Maryland. 16th Street Northwest heads south from the circle toward the White House. The circle also includes junctions with Eastern Avenue, North Portal Drive, and MD 384 (Colesville Road), which leads to U.S. Route 29 in downtown Silver Spring. There is no direct access from southbound MD 390 to MD 384; southbound MD 390 traffic must travel around Blair Portal to access the other state highway. MD 390 heads north from Blair Portal as a six-lane divided highway. North of its intersections with MD 410 (East–West Highway) and Spring Street, the route passes through an S-curve after which the highway crosses over CSX's Metropolitan Subdivision railroad line, which carries MARC's Brunswick Line. North of the railroad tracks, Washington Metro's Red Line begins to run below the route and the state highway passes through an oblique intersection with Second Street. The two carriageways of MD 390 split to terminate at separate intersections with MD 97 (Georgia Avenue) in the Montgomery Hills neighborhood of Silver Spring. There is no direct access from northbound MD 97 to MD 390.

MD 390 is a part of the National Highway System as a principal arterial for its entire length.

== History ==
Maryland Route 653
- Location: Silver Spring
- Existed: 1939–1955

16th Street was extended as a concrete road north from Blair Portal to East–West Highway in 1930. Traffic on the new East–West Highway, also built around the same time, used 16th Street and the extended Colesville Road to access Georgia Avenue because the Bethesda–Silver Spring highway was not yet built east of 16th Street. The portion of East–West Highway from 16th Street to Georgia Avenue was completed in 1935. 16th Street from Blair Portal to MD 410 was numbered MD 653 by the time the highway was widened and resurfaced in 1949. Construction on the divided highway extension of 16th Street from MD 410 to MD 97 and expansion of MD 653 to a divided highway began in 1958. When the highway was completed in 1960, the entire length of 16th Street in Maryland was designated MD 390.

== Junction list ==
The entire route is in Silver Spring, Montgomery County.

mi	km	Destinations	Notes
0.00	0.00	16th Street south / Eastern Avenue south / North Portal Drive west – Washington	District of Columbia boundary at Blair Portal; southern terminus
0.02	0.032	MD 384 east (Colesville Road) to US 29 – Columbia	Western terminus of MD 384; no direct access from southbound MD 390 to MD 384
0.16	0.26	MD 410 (East–West Highway) – Bethesda, Takoma Park	
1.09	1.75	MD 97 (Georgia Avenue) to I-495 – Wheaton	Northern terminus; no direct access from northbound MD 97 to MD 390
1.000 mi = 1.609 km; 1.000 km = 0.621 mi: Incomplete access
