= Sligo Creek Parkway =

Parkway in Montgomery County, Maryland, United States

- Route of Sligo Creek Parkway highlighted in red

Route information
- Maintained by M-NCPPC
- Length: 5.6 mi (9.0 km)
- Restrictions: No commercial vehicles, No automobile traffic on Sunday between Old Carroll Avenue and MD 320

Major junctions
- South end: MD 650 in Takoma Park
- MD 320 in Silver Spring; MD 594 in Silver Spring; US 29 in Silver Spring
- North end: MD 193 in Wheaton

Location
- Country: United States
- State: Maryland
- Counties: Montgomery

Highway system
- Maryland highway system; Interstate; US; State; Scenic Byways

Sligo Creek Parkway is a two-lane at-grade automobile parkway in Montgomery County in the U.S. state of Maryland. The two-lane parkway runs 5.6 mi (9.0 km) from Maryland Route 650 (MD 650) in Takoma Park through Silver Spring north to MD 193 in Maryland. Sligo Creek Parkway parallels Sligo Creek and the Sligo Creek Trail as it passes through various units of Sligo Creek Park and by a variety of recreational facilities. The parkway is maintained by the Maryland-National Capital Park and Planning Commission. Sligo Creek Parkway is closed to trucks at all times. In addition, the section between Old Carroll Avenue and MD 320 is closed to automobile traffic on Sundays.

== Route description ==
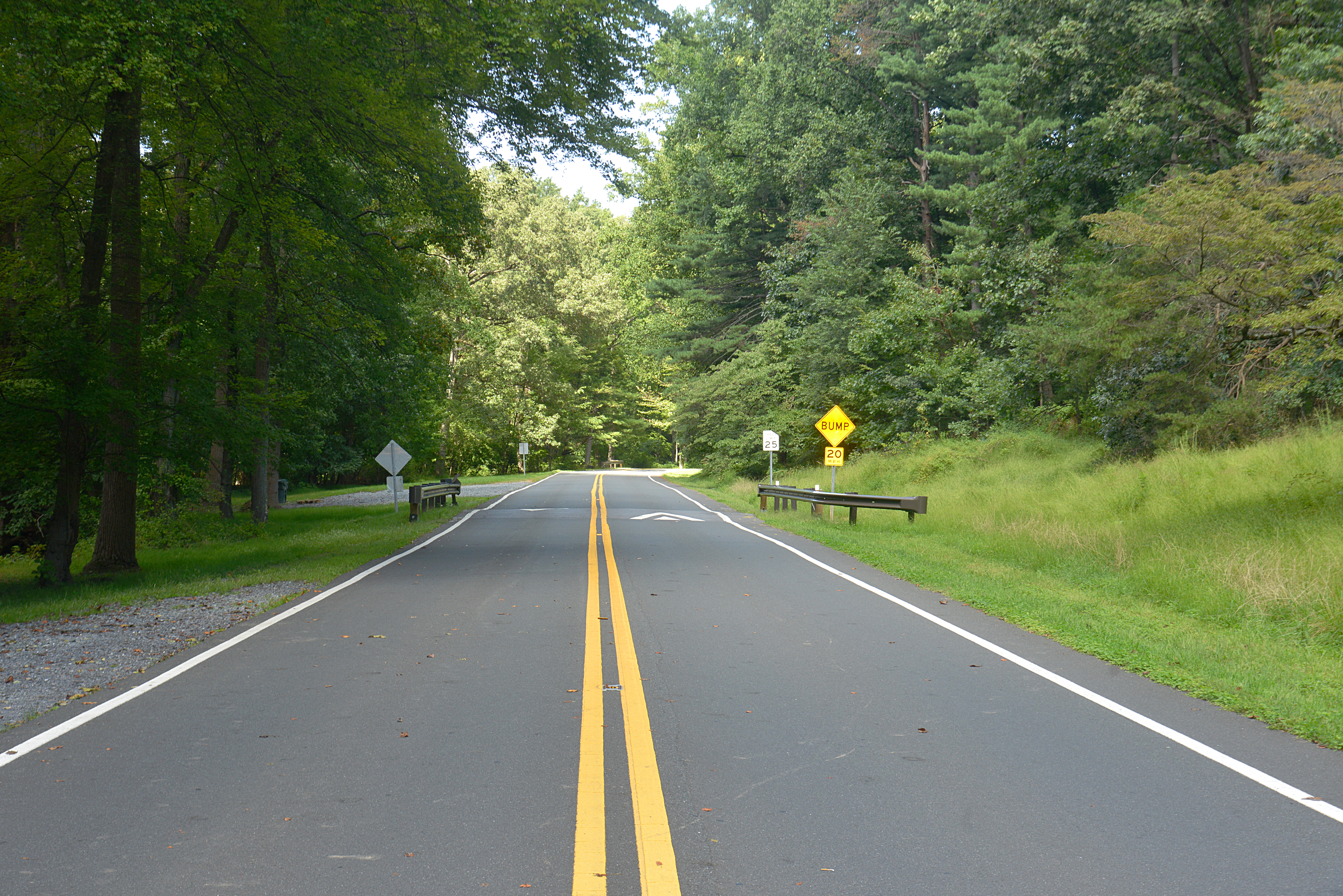
Sligo Creek Parkway in Silver Spring

Sligo Creek Parkway begins at MD 650 (New Hampshire Avenue) in Takoma Park. The parkway heads west as a two-lane road with a speed limit of 25 mph (40 km/h), paralleling Sligo Creek and the Sligo Creek Trail to the south. At a southward bend of Sligo Creek, Flower Avenue continues straight while Sligo Creek Parkway turns south. After returning to a westward heading, the parkway intersects Old Carroll Avenue, which is used to access MD 195 (Carroll Avenue), which passes above the parkway on the Carroll Avenue Bridge. Old Carroll Avenue is also the southern limit of road closure to vehicular traffic on Sundays. When Sligo Creek Parkway reaches Maple Avenue, the parkway becomes concurrent with Maple Avenue and crosses Sligo Creek and the Sligo Creek Trail at grade. From this point, the creek and trail remain south of the parkway. At the next intersection, Maple Avenue continues north, an entrance to Washington Adventist Hospital is on the east, and Sligo Creek Parkway heads west.

Sligo Creek Parkway continues northwest through Takoma Park on a stretch featuring many blind curves. After the curvy section, the parkway temporarily turns west and intersects MD 320 (Piney Branch Road), which is the northern limit of road closure to vehicular traffic on Sundays. Throughout this section, residents local to Sligo Creek Parkway are granted vehicular access. Sligo Creek Parkway resumes its northwest course through Silver Spring and meets MD 594 (Wayne Avenue). Beyond Wayne Avenue, the parkway comes to a three-way stop at Schuyler Road and speed humps start crossing the road at regular intervals. Houses also line the east side of the parkway leading up to the five-way intersection with U.S. Route 29 (Colesville Road). The parkway continues northwest, passing Brunett Avenue, then turns north and parallels the Sligo Creek Golf Course. Sligo Creek Parkway passes under the Capital Beltway before intersecting Forest Glen Road. After meeting Dennis Avenue at a four-way stop, the parkway continues north to its terminus at MD 193 (University Boulevard) in Wheaton.

The average gradient of the parkway is .75%, with occasional sections exceeding 4%; generally the parkway becomes steeper and more undulating as one approaches the southern terminus. The stretch immediately south of Piney Branch/MD-320 is fairly steep, as is the area around the intersection with Old Carroll Ave. The total elevation difference/change on the parkway is 220 feet, with the northern terminus being 345 feet above sea level at University Blvd., and the southern terminus being 225 feet above sea level at New Hampshire Avenue.

== History ==
The Sligo Creek Parkway has its origins in 1927 with the establishment of the Maryland-National Capital Park and Planning Commission to create a park system in the Maryland suburbs of Washington, DC. They quickly settled on stream valleys as that land was unfit for buildings, prone to floods and held valuable natural resources. The plans for Sligo Creek Parkway were developed in 1929 and land acquisition started the next year, aided by the Capper-Crampton Act of 1930. Construction of the road was done in three phases between 1930 and 1954.

The first section of the road, between Park Valley Road and Colesville Road, opened on September 1, 1934. At that time there was to be a narrow road on each side of Sligo Creek - an East and West Drive - and a bridle path in-between them. Actual construction resulted in one, wider road on the West Drive alignment south of Maple Avenue and on the East Drive alignment north of there. The Sligo Trail meanwhile generally follow the path of East Drive south of Maple and the bridle path north of it. The trail was originally built as a bridle path and paved for bike use later, with most of the trail bridges upgraded between 1994 and 2002.

Plans for the parkway north from Colesville Road to Forest Glen Road were completed in 1934 and was built by 1945.

The third and final section, from Forest Glen to University Boulevard was paved in 1954.

== Junction list ==
The entire parkway is in Montgomery County.

Location	mi	km	Destinations	Notes
Takoma Park	0.0	0.0	MD 650 (New Hampshire Avenue) – Langley Park, Washington	Southern terminus
Takoma Park	0.7	1.1	Old Carroll Avenue to MD 195	Carroll Avenue Bridge
Takoma Park	1.0	1.6	Maple Avenue south	South end of concurrency with Maple Avenue
Takoma Park	1.1	1.8	Maple Avenue north	North end of concurrency with Maple Avenue
Takoma Park	1.9	3.1	MD 320 (Piney Branch Road) – Takoma Park, Silver Spring	
Silver Spring	2.3	3.7	Wayne Avenue (MD 594) – Downtown Silver Spring	Officially MD 594A
Silver Spring	3.1	5.0	US 29 (Colesville Road) – Downtown Silver Spring, Columbia	
Silver Spring	3.3	5.3	Brunett Avenue	Former MD 593
Silver Spring	4.1	6.6	Forest Glen Road to MD 97 / MD 192 – Forest Glen	Former MD 597
Wheaton	4.7	7.6	Dennis Avenue	
Wheaton	5.6	9.0	MD 193 (University Boulevard) – Wheaton, Silver Spring	Northern terminus
1.000 mi = 1.609 km; 1.000 km = 0.621 mi: Concurrency terminus

== See also ==
- List of car-free places
