= Maryland Route 320 =

State highway in Maryland, United States

Maryland Route 320
- Piney Branch Road
- Maryland Route 320 highlighted in red

Route information
- Maintained by MDSHA
- Length: 2.84 mi (4.57 km)
- Existed: 1927–present

Major junctions
- South end: Piney Branch Road at the District of Columbia boundary in Takoma Park
- MD 410 in Takoma Park; MD 193 in Silver Spring
- North end: MD 650 in Adelphi

Location
- Country: United States
- State: Maryland
- Counties: Montgomery, Prince George's

Highway system
- Maryland highway system; Interstate; US; State; Scenic Byways
← MD 318	→ MD 322

Maryland Route 320 (MD 320) is a state highway in the U.S. state of Maryland. Known as Piney Branch Road, the highway runs 2.84 miles (4.57 km) from Eastern Avenue at the District of Columbia boundary in Takoma Park north to MD 650 in Adelphi. MD 320 is a southwest–northeast highway that connects Takoma Park and Silver Spring in southeastern Montgomery County with Adelphi in far western Prince George's County. The state highway originally extended from downtown Silver Spring to White Oak and connected with U.S. Route 29 (US 29) at both ends. The Silver Spring–Adelphi portion of the highway was constructed in 1910. The segment through Takoma Park and the Adelphi–White Oak segment, which later became MD 650, were built in the early 1930s; the Takoma Park portion was built as MD 513. MD 320 was widened over its whole length in the late 1940s and reduced to its present course in the mid-1950s.

== Route description ==
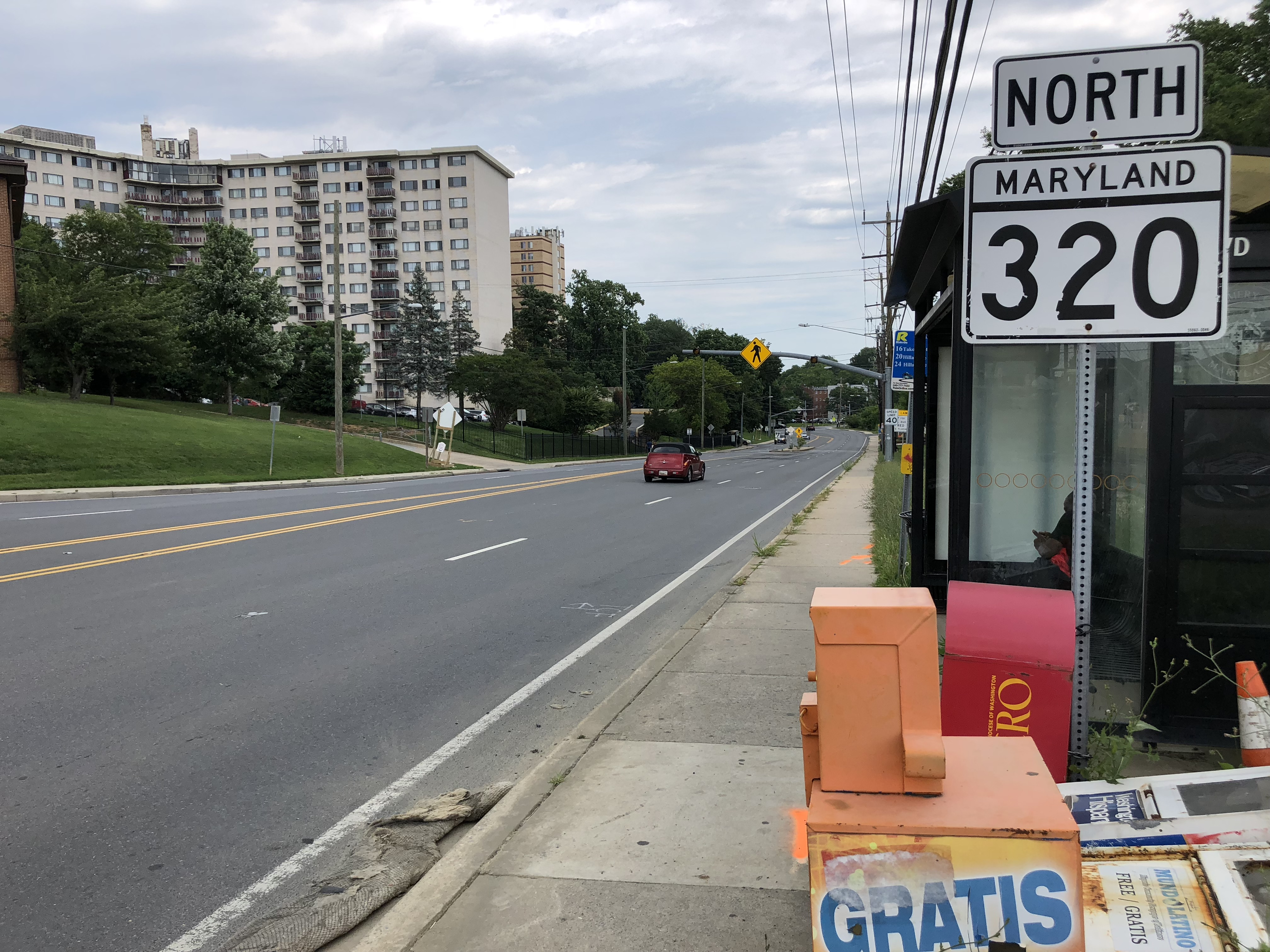
View north along MD 320 at MD 193 in Silver Spring

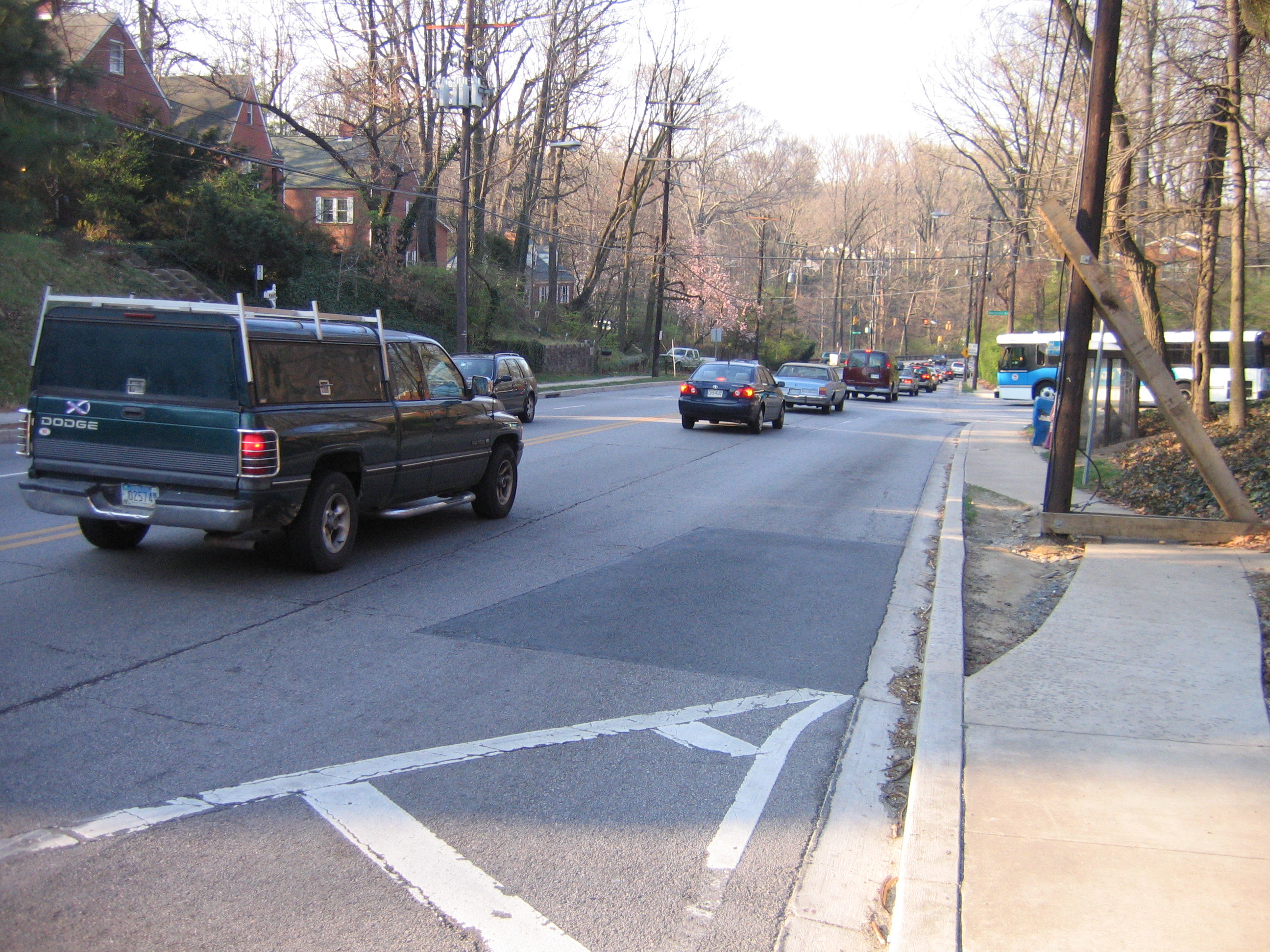
MD 320 southbound at Manchester Road in Silver Spring

MD 320 begins at the intersection of Piney Branch Road and Eastern Avenue at the District of Columbia boundary in the city of Takoma Park. Piney Branch Road continues southwest into Washington, where it immediately passes under CSX's Metropolitan Subdivision railroad line and the Washington Metro's Red Line. Eastern Avenue provides access to the Takoma station on the Red Line and the Takoma Park Historic District to the southeast; the street also leads to the Takoma Park/Silver Spring Campus of Montgomery College to the northwest. MD 320 heads northeast as a narrow two-lane undivided road. The highway expands as it veers north at one-way northbound Chestnut Avenue and intersects MD 410 (Philadelphia Avenue). The highway curves northeast and gains a center turn lane as it leaves the city of Takoma Park and passes west of Takoma Park Middle School.

MD 320 parallels the city limits to Mississippi Avenue, where the highway fully enters the unincorporated area of Silver Spring. MD 320 intersects Sligo Avenue and Dale Drive, then descends into the valley of Sligo Creek. The highway crosses the creek and intersects Sligo Creek Parkway and the Sligo Creek Trail. At the top of its climb out of the creek valley, MD 320 intersects Flower Avenue, which was formerly MD 787. The highway continues east as a four-lane road with a center left-turn lane, crossing Long Branch before intersecting MD 193 (University Boulevard). Beyond MD 193, MD 320 descends into the valley of Northwest Branch. The highway meets the northern end of Carroll Avenue, which leads south to MD 195. MD 320 crosses the Montgomery–Prince George's County line and crosses Northwest Branch before it reaches its northern terminus at MD 650 (New Hampshire Avenue) in Adelphi.

== History ==
Maryland Route 513
- Location: Takoma Park
- Existed: 1932–1955

MD 320 originally had its southern terminus at the intersection of US 29 and Sligo Avenue in Silver Spring. The highway followed Sligo Avenue east to Piney Branch Road, then followed Piney Branch Road northeast to Adelphi. MD 320 continued roughly along what is now New Hampshire Avenue to its northern terminus at US 29, which is now the intersection of MD 650 and Lockwood Drive in White Oak. The portion of this highway from modern US 29 to Carroll Avenue was paved by Montgomery County with state aid as a macadam road by 1910. Sligo Avenue was widened with a pair of 3-foot-wide (0.91 m) concrete shoulders in 1926. MD 320 was extended north as a 18-foot-wide (5.5 m) macadam road from Carroll Avenue through Prince George's County to White Oak in 1931 and 1932. The portion of MD 320 south of Sligo Avenue was built in two segments. The first segment, from the District of Columbia to Chestnut Avenue just south of MD 410, was a concrete reconstruction of Saratoga Avenue. The second segment, from Chestnut Avenue to Sligo Avenue, was a concrete road built on a new alignment. Both segments were constructed in 1931 and 1932 and were designated MD 513.

MD 513 was widened with a pair of 10-foot-wide (3.0 m) bituminous shoulders from MD 410 toward Sligo Avenue in 1942. MD 320 was expanded to a width of 24 feet (7.3 m) and resurfaced over its entire length in 1947 and 1948. MD 320's bridge across Long Branch was widened in 1953 and 1954. The highway's bridge across Northwest Branch at the MD 650 junction, which had originally been built in 1910, was widened in 1954 and 1955. MD 320 was placed on its present course in 1955; its northern end was truncated at MD 650. Its southern portion was moved from Sligo Avenue and replaced MD 513 through Takoma Park; Sligo Avenue was redesignated MD 339. MD 339 was removed from the state highway system by 1999.

== Junction list ==
County	Location	mi	km	Destinations	Notes
Montgomery	Takoma Park	0.00	0.00	Eastern Avenue / Piney Branch Road south – Washington	District of Columbia boundary; southern terminus
Montgomery	Takoma Park	0.39	0.63	MD 410 (Philadelphia Avenue) – Hyattsville, Silver Spring	
Montgomery	Silver Spring	1.43	2.30	Sligo Creek Parkway	
Montgomery	Silver Spring	2.09	3.36	MD 193 (University Boulevard) – Wheaton, Langley Park	
Prince George's	Adelphi	2.84	4.57	MD 650 (New Hampshire Avenue) – White Oak, Langley Park	Northern terminus
1.000 mi = 1.609 km; 1.000 km = 0.621 mi
