= Maryland Route 193 =

Highway in Maryland, United States

Maryland Route 193
- Maryland Route 193 highlighted in red

Route information
- Maintained by MDSHA
- Length: 26.07 mi (41.96 km)
- Existed: 1927–present

Major junctions
- West end: MD 185 in Kensington
- MD 97 in Wheaton; US 29 in Silver Spring; I-495 in Silver Spring; MD 650 in Langley Park; US 1 in College Park; MD 201 in Greenbelt; Baltimore–Washington Parkway in Greenbelt; MD 564 in Glenn Dale; MD 450 in Glenn Dale; MD 214 in Kettering
- East end: MD 202 in Kettering

Location
- Country: United States
- State: Maryland
- Counties: Montgomery, Prince George's

Highway system
- Maryland highway system; Interstate; US; State; Scenic Byways
← MD 192	→ MD 194

Maryland Route 193 (MD 193) is a state highway in the U.S. state of Maryland. Known for most of its length as University Boulevard and Greenbelt Road, the state highway runs 26.07 mi (41.96 km) from MD 185 in Kensington east to MD 202 north of Upper Marlboro. MD 193 serves as a major east–west commuter route in eastern Montgomery County and northern Prince George's County, connecting Wheaton, Silver Spring, Langley Park, College Park, and Greenbelt. The state highway also provides the primary access to the University of Maryland and Goddard Space Flight Center. In central Prince George's County, MD 193 is the main north–south highway connecting Glenn Dale and Greater Upper Marlboro with the affluent suburbs of Woodmore and Kettering.

MD 193 originally consisted of Connecticut Avenue between Chevy Chase and Kensington and Old Bladensburg Road (now University Boulevard) between Kensington and College Park. While MD 185 replaced MD 193 on the Connecticut Avenue portion in the 1970s, MD 193 grew on its eastern end by taking over the routing of MD 430 between College Park and Greenbelt and MD 199 in Glenn Dale in the early 1960s. MD 193 reached its final extent by taking over MD 556 between Glenn Dale and Greater Upper Marlboro in the late 1980s. The state highway's expansion from a two-lane road to a divided highway with four to six lanes began in the 1950s and continued through the 1990s.

== Route description ==
MD 193 is a part of the National Highway System as a principal arterial from its western terminus in Kensington east to MD 450 near Glenn Dale.

=== Montgomery County ===
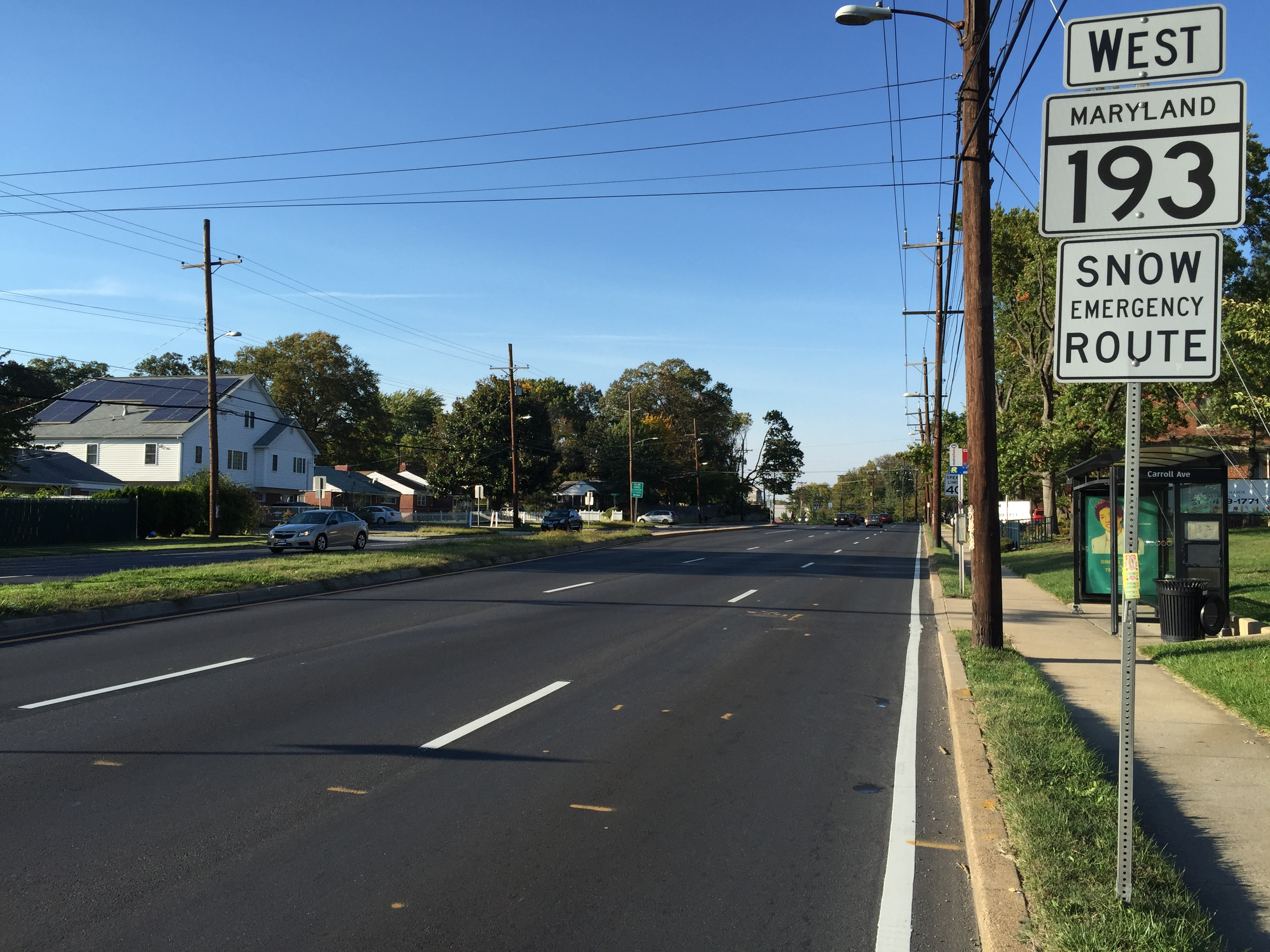
MD 193 westbound at MD 195 in Silver Spring

MD 193 begins at an acute intersection with MD 185 (Connecticut Avenue) in Kensington. There is no access between southbound MD 185 and eastbound MD 193, as well as between westbound MD 193 and northbound MD 185; those movements use Perry Avenue. The state highway, named University Boulevard, heads northeast as a six-lane divided highway through a commercial area. After leaving the town limits of Kensington, MD 193 passes through a mix of apartment complexes and single family homes. The state highway enters the commercial district of Wheaton, where the road passes the Westfield Wheaton shopping mall and intersects MD 586 (Veirs Mill Road). MD 586 south is used to access the Wheaton station along Washington Metro's Red Line. MD 193 continues east through the commercial area to meet MD 97 (Georgia Avenue). There are no left turns allowed from MD 193 to MD 97; instead, the eastbound and westbound directions use Grandview Avenue and Amherst Avenue, respectively, to complete the missing movements.

After passing the WFED radio transmitter, MD 193 heads southeast through suburban residential areas. The state highway descends into the valley of Sligo Creek, where the highway meets the northern end of Sligo Creek Parkway and crosses the Sligo Creek Trail. MD 193 passes a cluster of high-rise apartment buildings and Northwood High School around the intersection with Arcola Avenue and turns south, passing Dennis Avenue. MD 193 splits into a one-way pair upon entering the Four Corners commercial area, where the highway intersects U.S. Route 29 (US 29) and passes Montgomery Blair High School. The state highway then meets Interstate 495 (I-495, Capital Beltway) at a partial cloverleaf interchange that is missing the movements between I-495 east and MD 193 west and between MD 193 east and I-495 west. The missing movements are completed by using US 29 south of Four Corners. After crossing the Capital Beltway, MD 193 continues south through residential suburban areas of Silver Spring, intersecting East Franklin Avenue. After meeting MD 320 and passing Quebec Terrace Park, the state highway turns southeast and enters an area of garden apartments and duplexes. After crossing MD 195 at an oblique angle, MD 193 enters Prince George's County.

=== Prince George's County ===
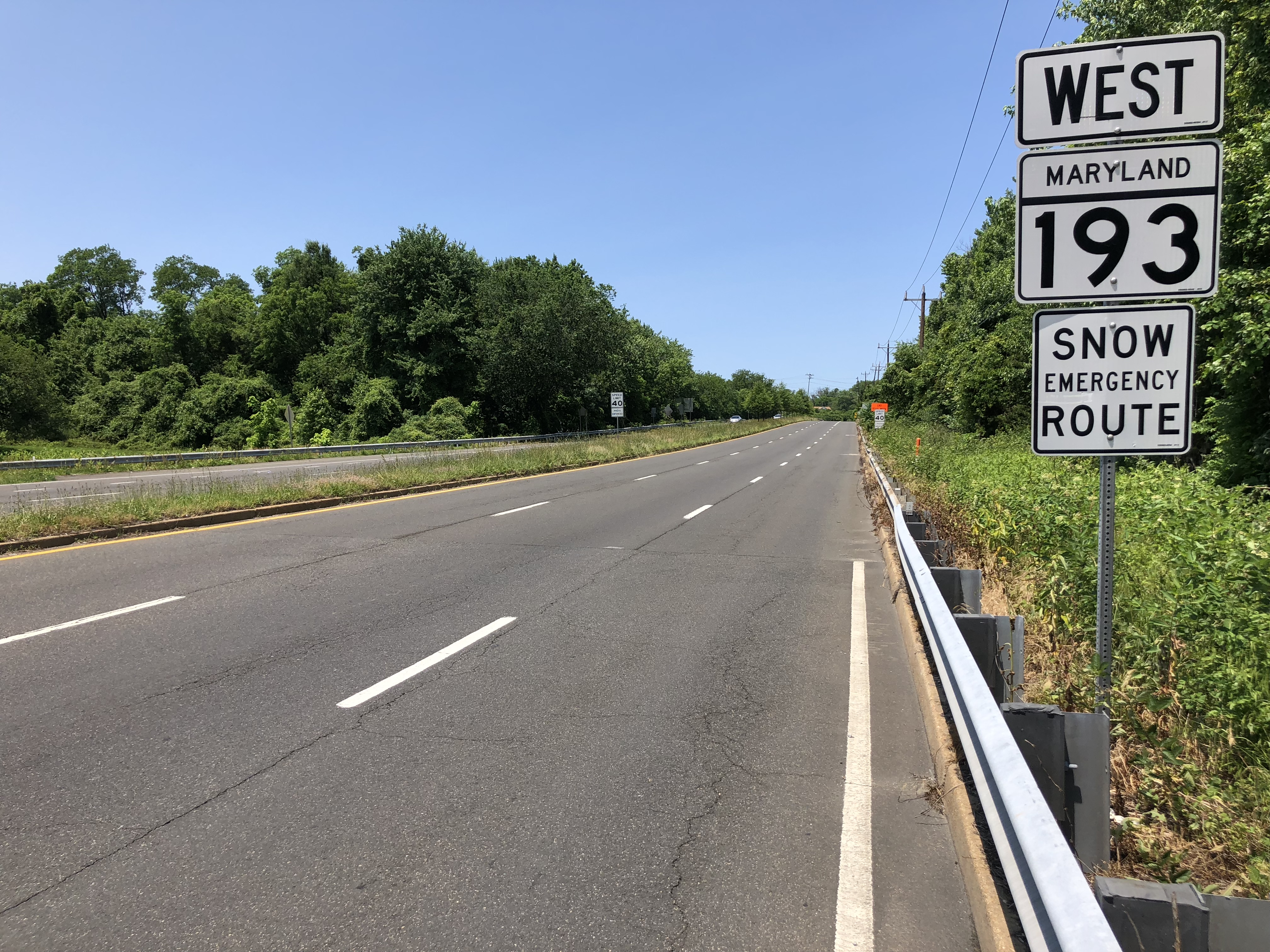
MD 193 westbound in College Park

MD 193 continues east into Langley Park, an area with multiple shopping centers, garden apartments, and heavy pedestrian cross-traffic. MD 193 meets MD 650 (New Hampshire Avenue) at Takoma-Langley Crossroads, an intersection with a shopping center on all four corners and the Takoma Langley Crossroads Transit Center located at the northwest corner. The state highway continues straight southeast toward its junction with MD 212, where MD 193 turns east. After passing Lane Manor Recreation Center, the state highway leaves the commercial area and crosses Northwest Branch. Here the highway reduces to four lanes. MD 193 continues east through a forested area toward College Park. Campus Drive continues straight toward the University of Maryland campus as well as University of Maryland Global Campus, while MD 193 veers left and intersects Adelphi Road. Movements between MD 193 east and Adelphi Road south are made via Campus Drive. After passing Adelphi Road, the state highway heads northeast past the intersection with Stadium Drive, which is used to access Maryland Stadium and the Clarice Smith Performing Arts Center. After turning east again, MD 193 intersects Paint Branch Drive, which serves the Xfinity Center arena. The state highway passes Paint Branch Golf Course and crosses Paint Branch, after which the highway intersects US 1 at a partial interchange. The missing movements are made via a right-in/right-out interchange on the eastbound side just to the east of the partial interchange, and through Greenbelt Road (unsigned MD 430) just to the east of Rhode Island Avenue, which has a westbound at-grade exit and eastbound entrance.

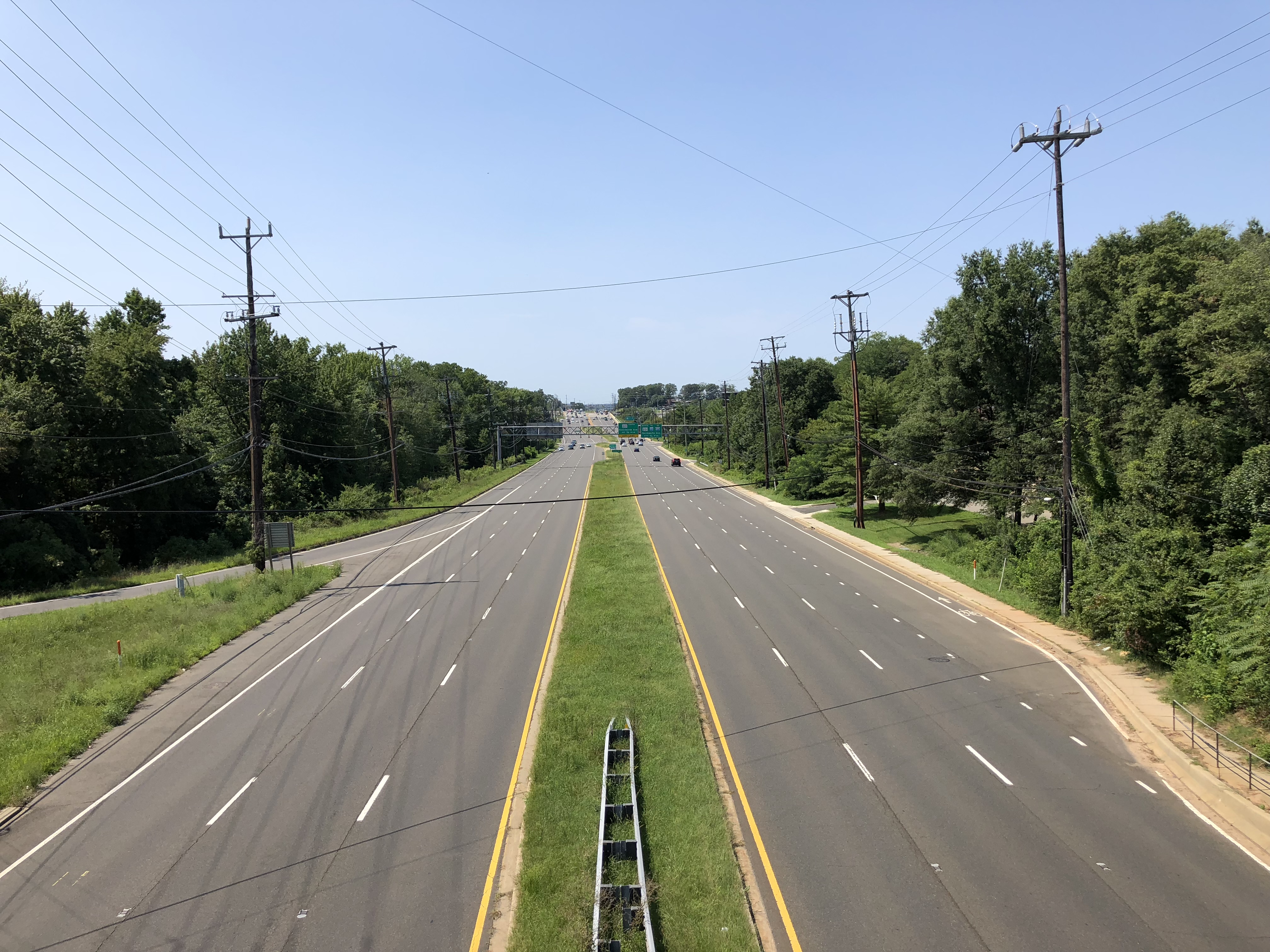
MD 193 westbound viewed from I-95/I-495 in Greenbelt

After passing Greenbelt Road, MD 193 expands to six lanes and its name changes to Greenbelt Road. The state highway crosses CSX's Capital Subdivision railroad line, MARC's Camden Line, and the Green Line of the Washington Metro and Indian Creek, then enters a commercial area as the highway straddles the northern boundary of Berwyn Heights. After passing Cherrywood Drive, which leads to the Greenbelt Metro station, MD 193 passes Beltway Plaza shopping mall. The state highway then meets MD 201 (Kenilworth Avenue) at a diamond interchange. MD 193 continues east into Greenbelt as an eight-lane divided highway past Greenbelt Park until right before passing under the Capital Beltway, where the right lane eastbound exits for the southbound Baltimore-Washington Parkway. Both directions of MD 193 access the southbound parkway via Southway, which heads north into the Greenbelt Historic District. After crossing the parkway, MD 193 has an intersection with the northbound ramps to the parkway. After passing south of Eleanor Roosevelt High School, the road reduces to four lanes and the state highway passes a series of apartment complexes on the south and the campus of Goddard Space Flight Center on the north. Beyond Goddard, MD 193 heads north of DuVal High School before it crosses Good Luck Road. The road passes some more apartments and shopping centers in Glenn Dale before meeting MD 564 (Lanham Severn Road).

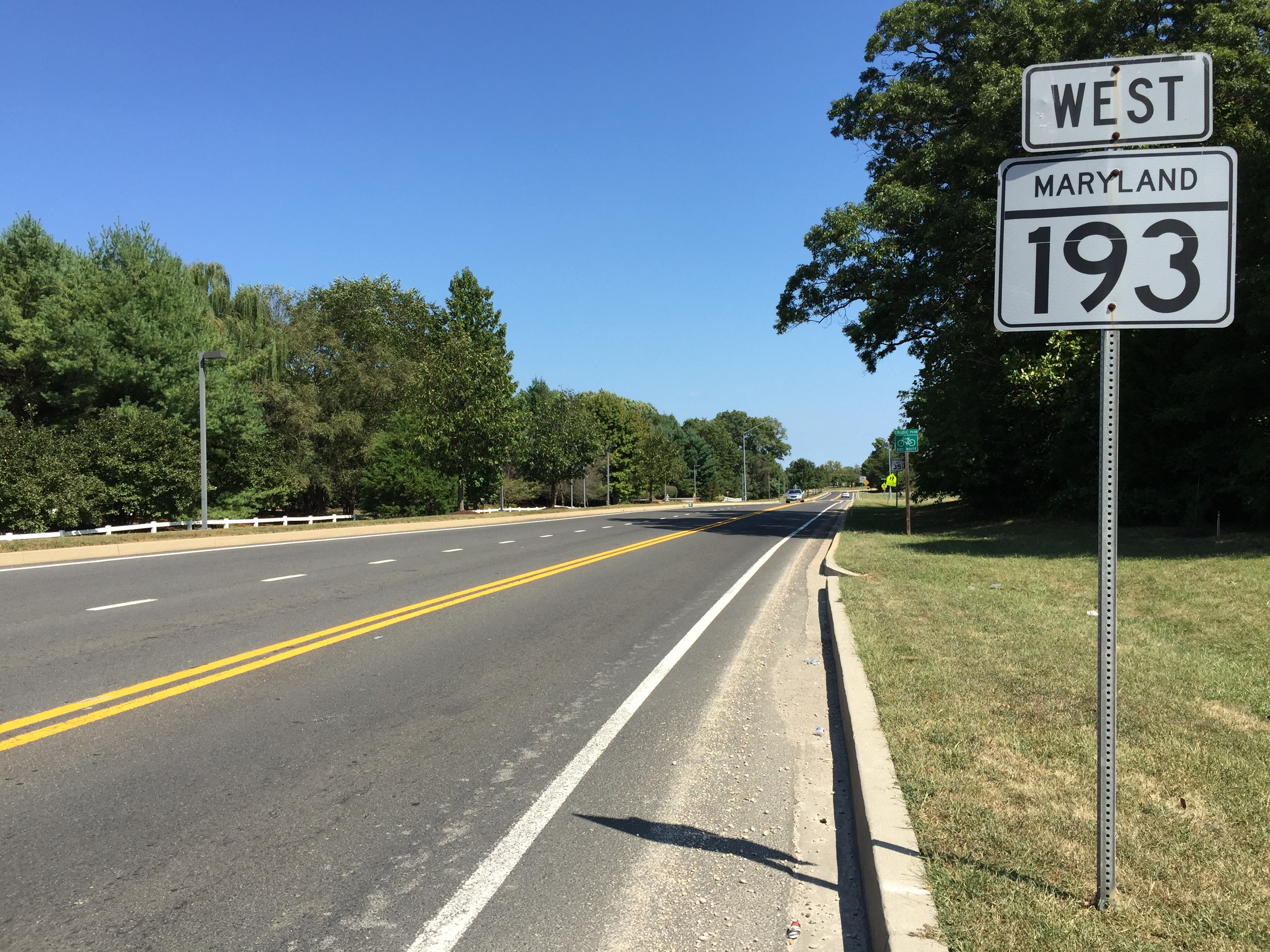
View west at the east end of MD 193 at MD 202 in Kettering

MD 193 heads southeast from MD 564 as Glenn Dale Boulevard, a four-lane divided highway with a wide median through scattered residential subdivisions. The state highway immediately crosses Amtrak's Northeast Corridor railroad line and MARC's Penn Line as well as Folly Branch. MD 193 passes Marietta, a historic home and museum, before its intersection with MD 450 (Annapolis Road), where the name of the highway changes to Enterprise Road. Beyond MD 450, the state highway slims down to two lanes and passes through residential subdivisions. After an intersection with the old alignment, MD 953 (Glenn Dale Road), MD 193 temporarily becomes a divided highway as it passes under the US 50 freeway. The state highway enters the affluent suburb of Woodmore, where it passes the Country Club at Woodmore and Enterprise Golf Course, which features the Newton White Mansion, before intersecting Lottsford Road and Woodmore Road. MD 193 continues south and temporarily expands to a four-lane divided highway prior to crossing the Northeast Branch of the Western Branch of the Patuxent River and meeting MD 214 (Central Avenue) in Kettering. Beyond MD 214, the state highway becomes a two-lane undivided road and changes its name to Watkins Park Drive. MD 193 passes Watkins Regional Park and First Baptist Church of Glenarden before encountering Oak Grove Drive at a roundabout. From there, the state highway turns southwest and meets its eastern terminus at MD 202 (Largo Road) at the boundary between the census-designated places of Kettering and Brock Hall.

== History ==
MD 193 originally consisted of two named portions, Connecticut Avenue from Chevy Chase to Kensington and University Lane from Kensington to College Park. The Connecticut Avenue segment is now MD 185; that portion's history is covered in more detail in the Maryland Route 185 article. University Lane was paved from Kensington to Wheaton and from Four Corners to MD 320 in Silver Spring by 1927. The pavement extended from MD 320 to MD 212 in 1930; the segment of road on the University of Maryland campus was also paved. By 1933, MD 193 was fully paved from Kensington to US 1 in College Park when the portion between MD 212 and the university was completed on a new alignment.

Maryland Route 556
- Location: Woodmore
- Existed: 1933–1989

The roads over which MD 193 would later be extended east consisted of three state highways:

- MD 430 (Greenbelt Road) was completed on a new alignment in 1942 between US 1 in College Park and MD 205 (now MD 201) in Greenbelt. Greenbelt Road continued east as a county-maintained highway towards Glenn Dale.
- MD 199 (Glenn Dale Road) was paved from US 50 (now MD 450) north to the Penn Line in 1927. The MD 199 designation was extended north to MD 564 in 1950, then removed from the entire road in 1954.
- MD 556 (Enterprise Road) was paved from MD 214 north to near Woodmore Road in 1933. A second segment of MD 556 was signed from US 50 south to the present intersection of MD 193 and MD 953 by 1939. The two segments were connected by a county-maintained segment that was brought under state control by 1946. MD 556 was extended south along Enterprise Road to MD 202 in 1955.

The four-lane divided bypass of the University of Maryland was started by 1955 and completed in 1956. At that time, MD 193 turned south at the right-in/right-out ramps just east of the US 1 overpass to a right angle intersection with MD 430. The four-lane divided highway was extended west from College Park in stages, reaching MD 650 in 1957, Franklin Avenue (then MD 516) in 1959, US 29 in Four Corners in 1960, and Kensington in the early 1960s. MD 193's western terminus was moved from Chevy Chase to Kensington in the 1970s. MD 193 was expanded to six lanes between Kensington and Langley Park beginning in 1972.

Between 1962 and 1964, MD 193 was extended east as a four-lane divided highway from College Park along MD 430 and the remainder of Greenbelt Road to Glenn Dale. The state highway then headed south along Glenn Dale Road (former MD 199) to MD 450, then south along the part of Glenn Dale Road that had never been state-maintained to an intersection with MD 556 just north of the US 50 freeway. MD 193 was expanded to six lanes between MD 430 and just east of MD 201 in 1988, when the MD 201 interchange was completed. The six lane section was extended to the east edge of Greenbelt in 1994.

Glenn Dale Boulevard, a four-lane divided highway, was finished in 1986 when its bridge over the Penn Line was completed, replacing a grade crossing at Glenn Dale Road. Glenn Dale Boulevard extended south to the intersection of MD 450 and MD 556. MD 193 was extended south on Glenn Dale Boulevard then replaced MD 556 on Enterprise Road south to MD 214. Finally, Watkins Park Drive was built in 1988 on a new alignment, replacing Enterprise Road south of MD 214. MD 193 was extended along Watkins Park Drive and replaced the remaining segment of MD 556.

== Junction list ==
County	Location	mi	km	Destinations	Notes
Montgomery	Kensington	0.00	0.00	MD 185 south (Connecticut Avenue) – Chevy Chase	Western terminus; no direct access from MD 193 to northbound MD 185 or from southbound MD 185 to MD 193
Montgomery	Wheaton	1.24	2.00	MD 586 (Veirs Mill Road) – Rockville	
Montgomery	Wheaton	1.46	2.35	MD 97 (Georgia Avenue) – Silver Spring, Glenmont	No direct access from eastbound MD 193 to northbound MD 97 or from westbound MD 193 to southbound MD 97
Montgomery	Wheaton	2.74	4.41	Sligo Creek Parkway south	Northern terminus of Sligo Creek Parkway
Montgomery	Silver Spring	4.32	6.95	US 29 (Colesville Road) to I-495 west – Columbia, Washington	
Montgomery	Silver Spring	4.91	7.90	I-495 (Capital Beltway) – College Park, Baltimore, Northern Virginia	I-495 Exit 29; no access from eastbound MD 193 to westbound I-495 or from eastbound I-495 to westbound MD 193
Montgomery	Silver Spring	6.15	9.90	MD 320 (Piney Branch Road) – Takoma Park, Adelphi	
Montgomery	Takoma Park	6.58	10.59	MD 195 south (Carroll Avenue)	Northern terminus of MD 195; no direct access from westbound MD 193 to southbound MD 195
Prince George's	Langley Park	7.03	11.31	MD 650 (New Hampshire Avenue) – Takoma Park, White Oak	
Prince George's	Langley Park	7.61	12.25	MD 212 (Riggs Road) – Chillum, Adelphi	
Prince George's	College Park	8.81	14.18	Campus Drive east to Adelphi Road – University of Maryland	Unsigned MD 193B; access from eastbound MD 193 and to westbound MD 193
Prince George's	College Park	8.92	14.36	Adelphi Road to Campus Drive – Adelphi, University Park	
Prince George's	College Park	10.79	17.36	US 1 (Baltimore Avenue) – University of Maryland, Baltimore	Partial cloverleaf interchange with half of movements
Prince George's	College Park	10.87	17.49	To US 1 north (Baltimore Avenue) – Laurel, Baltimore	Eastbound right-in, right-out interchange
Prince George's	College Park	11.32	18.22	Greenbelt Road (MD 430 west) to US 1 south – College Park	Eastern terminus of MD 430; access from westbound MD 193 and to eastbound MD 193
Prince George's	Greenbelt	12.53	20.17	MD 201 (Kenilworth Avenue) to I-95 / I-495 – Bladensburg, Greenbelt, Baltimore	Diamond interchange
Prince George's	Greenbelt	13.01	20.94	Baltimore–Washington Parkway (MD 295 south) – Washington	Eastbound exit only
Prince George's	Greenbelt	13.52	21.76	Southway north to Baltimore–Washington Parkway (MD 295 south) – Washington	Southway connects with exit from and entrance to southbound Baltimore–Washington Parkway
Prince George's	Greenbelt	13.85	22.29	Baltimore–Washington Parkway (MD 295 north) – Baltimore, BWI Airport	Exit from and entrance to northbound Baltimore–Washington Parkway
Prince George's	Glenn Dale	17.10	27.52	MD 564 (Lanham Severn Road) – Lanham, Bowie	
Prince George's	Glenn Dale	19.44	31.29	MD 450 (Annapolis Road) – Glenarden, Bowie	
Prince George's	Glenn Dale	20.27	32.62	MD 953 north (Glenn Dale Road) – Glenn Dale	Southern terminus of MD 953
Prince George's	Kettering	24.01	38.64	MD 214 (Central Avenue) – Largo, Bowie	
Prince George's	Kettering	25.77	41.47	Oak Grove Road	Roundabout
Prince George's	Kettering	26.07	41.96	MD 202 (Largo Road) – Largo, Upper Marlboro	Eastern terminus
1.000 mi = 1.609 km; 1.000 km = 0.621 mi: Incomplete access
