= Maryland Route 195 =

State highway in Montgomery County, Maryland, United States, known as Carroll Avenue

Maryland Route 195
- Carroll Avenue
- Maryland Route 195 highlighted in red

Route information
- Maintained by MDSHA
- Length: 1.90 mi (3.06 km)
- Existed: 1930–present

Major junctions
- South end: Carroll Street at the District of Columbia boundary in Takoma Park
- MD 410 in Takoma Park
- North end: MD 193 in Silver Spring

Location
- Country: United States
- State: Maryland
- Counties: Montgomery

Highway system
- Maryland highway system; Interstate; US; State; Scenic Byways
← I-195	→ MD 197

Maryland Route 195 (MD 195) is a state highway in the U.S. state of Maryland. Known as Carroll Avenue, the state highway runs 1.90 miles (3.06 km) from Eastern Avenue at the District of Columbia boundary in Takoma Park north to MD 193 in Silver Spring. MD 195 is the main northeast–southwest state highway through Takoma Park in southeastern Montgomery County. The highway provides access to Washington Adventist University and Washington Adventist Hospital and crosses Sligo Creek on the Carroll Avenue Bridge. The state highway was built from Washington, D.C., to Silver Spring in the late 1920s on a road that has existed since the 19th century. The bridge, built in 1932, is the third at the site; it was rebuilt from in 2015 to 2017.

== Route description ==
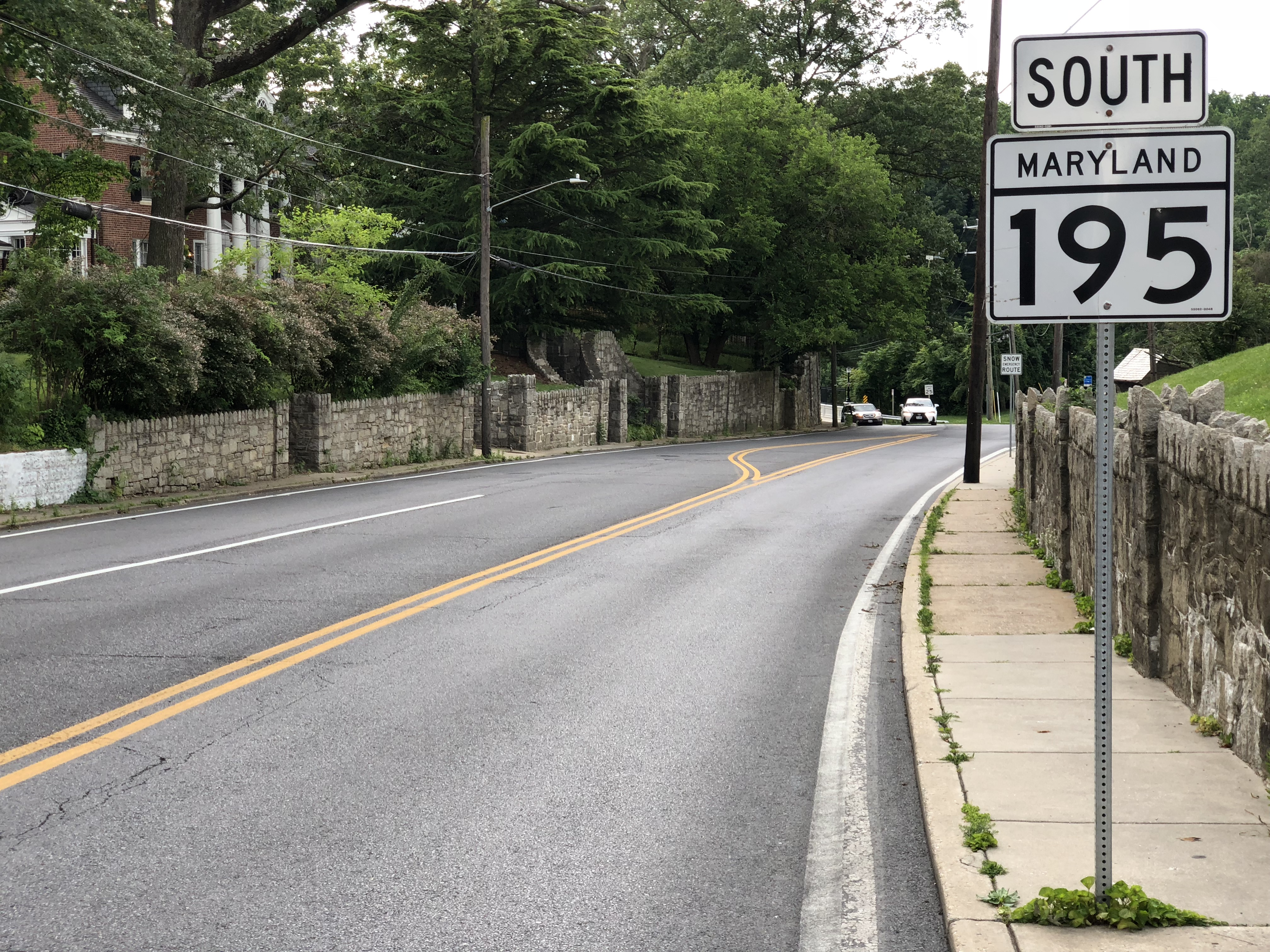
View south along MD 195 at Flower Avenue in Takoma Park

MD 195 begins at the intersection of Carroll Avenue, Eastern Avenue, and Willow Street at the District of Columbia boundary in the city of Takoma Park. The highway continues west as Carroll Street through the Takoma neighborhood of Washington, D.C., where it provides access to the Takoma station on the Washington Metro's Red Line. MD 195 heads east as a two-lane undivided street through the Takoma Park Historic District. The highway turns north at its intersection with Laurel Avenue, then northeast toward Takoma Junction. There, MD 195 briefly runs concurrently with MD 410. MD 410 heads northwest from Takoma Junction toward Silver Spring along Philadelphia Avenue and east from the concurrency along Ethan Allen Avenue. MD 195 continues northeast on Carroll Avenue and descends into the valley of Sligo Creek. Old Carroll Avenue splits northeast toward Sligo Creek Parkway as the state highway veers north and crosses the Carroll Avenue Bridge, a triple span reinforced concrete, open spandrel arch bridge that crosses the parkway, the creek, and the Sligo Creek Trail.

North of the Carroll Avenue Bridge, MD 195 intersects Flower Avenue, which was formerly MD 787 and is the main street through the Washington Adventist University campus. The state highway continues northeast from Flower Avenue and reaches the north city limit of Takoma Park beyond Garland Avenue. MD 195, which closely follows the city limit to its northern terminus, crosses Long Branch and veers north out of the stream valley. The highway gains an intermittent median and has a northbound service road, which is unsigned MD 195A, and passes the Davis-Warner House. MD 195 reaches its northern terminus at an oblique intersection with MD 193 (University Boulevard) on the eastern edge of Silver Spring. Carroll Avenue continues north as a county highway toward its northern end at MD 320 (Piney Branch Road).

== History ==
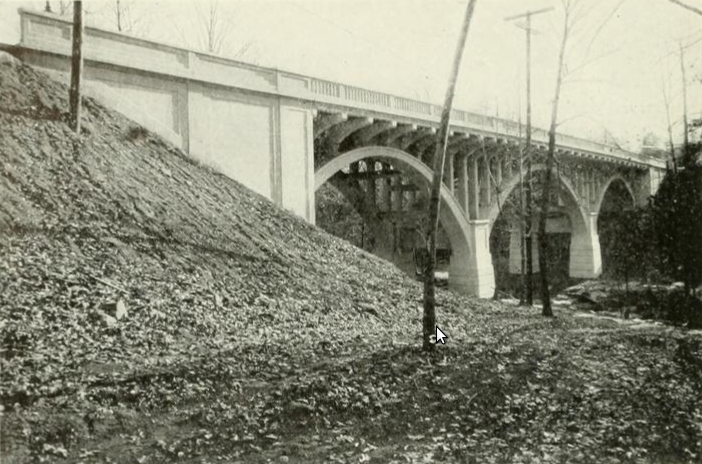
Carroll Avenue Bridge in the early 1930s

Carroll Avenue was part of an old road between Washington, D.C., and Sandy Spring that roughly followed present-day MD 195, MD 320, and MD 650 north to Ashton. The street was named for Samuel S. Carroll, the owner of the land around present-day Takoma Junction before its 1883 purchase by developer Benjamin Franklin Gilbert to create his planned suburb of Takoma Park. Between 1928 and 1930, MD 195 was paved over its whole length. In 1947, MD 195 was widened to 24 feet (7.3 m) and resurfaced from the northern town limit of Takoma Park near Garland Avenue north to MD 193. In 2005, the highway's bridge across Long Branch was replaced and the northbound service road north of Long Branch was built. T

The portion of MD 195 from Flower Avenue to near Garland Avenue was under municipal maintenance since at least 1930, although the Maryland State Highway Administration (MDSHA) may have unwittingly performed maintenance on it since then. The city officially transferred ownership of the Flower-to-Garland stretch to the state in an agreement dated February 16, 2013.

== Junction list ==
The entire route is in Montgomery County.

Location	mi	km	Destinations	Notes
Takoma Park	0.00	0.00	Eastern Avenue east / Willow Street south / Carroll Street west – Washington	District of Columbia boundary; southern terminus
Takoma Park	0.44	0.71	MD 410 west (Philadelphia Avenue) – Silver Spring	South end of concurrency with MD 410
Takoma Park	0.52	0.84	MD 410 east (Ethan Allen Avenue) – Hyattsville	North end of concurrency with MD 410
Takoma Park	0.99	1.59	Sligo Creek Parkway	Carroll Avenue Bridge; access via Old Carroll Avenue
Silver Spring	1.90	3.06	MD 193 (University Boulevard) / Carroll Avenue north – Silver Spring, Langley Park	Northern terminus; No direct access from westbound MD 193 to southbound MD 195
1.000 mi = 1.609 km; 1.000 km = 0.621 mi: Concurrency terminus; Incomplete access

== Auxiliary route ==
MD 195A is the designation for the Carroll Avenue Service Road, a 0.08-mile (0.13 km) one-lane service road that parallels the northbound side of MD 195 between Glenside Drive and Chester Street north of Long Branch.
