= Carroll Avenue Bridge (Maryland) =

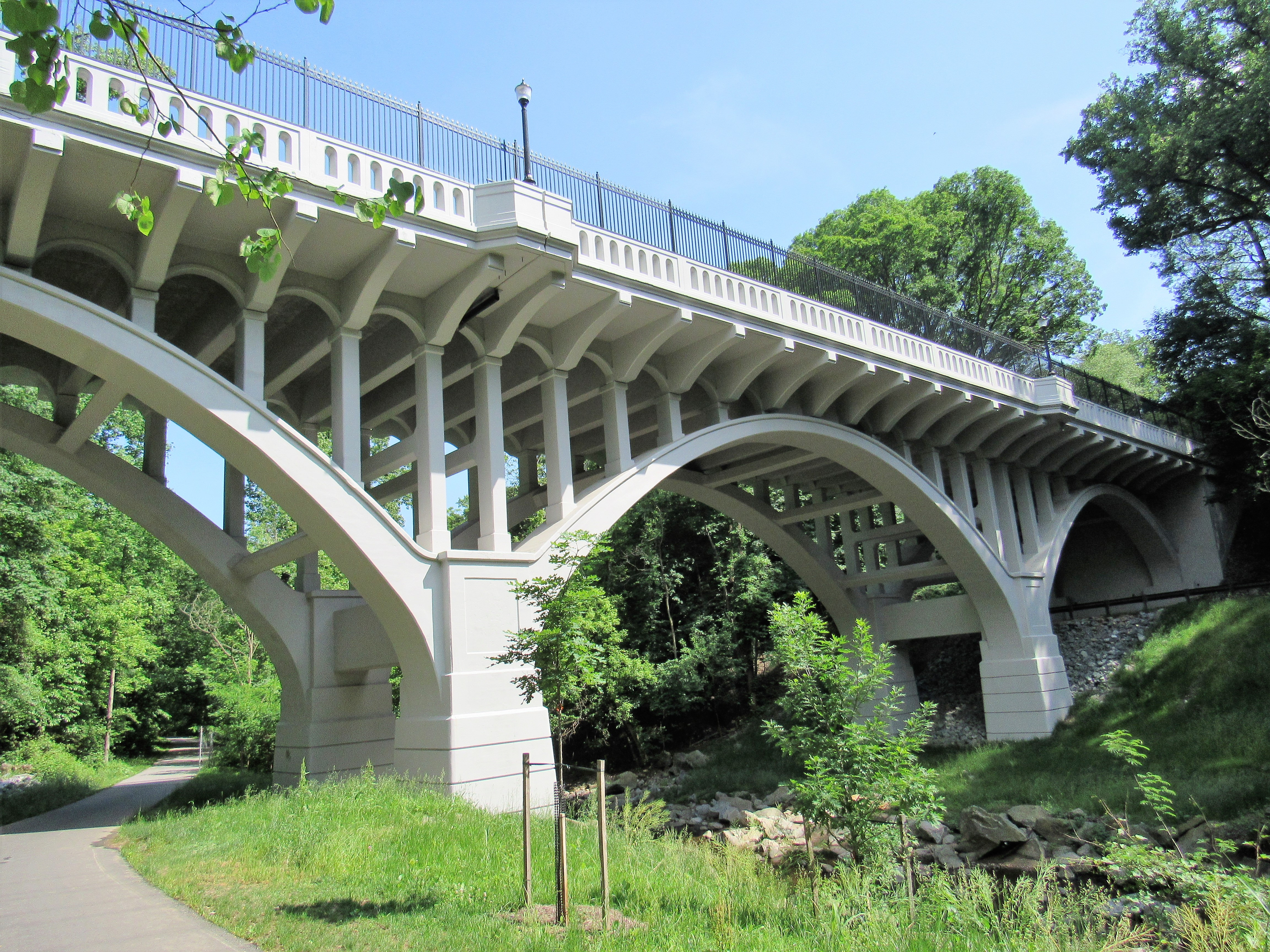
- Carroll Avenue Bridge
- Coordinates: 38.983234°N 77.000398°W
- Carries: Carroll Avenue, pedestrians
- Crosses: Sligo Creek Parkway
- Locale: Takoma Park
- Other name: Carroll Avenue bridge

Characteristics
- Design: arch bridge

History
- Opened: 1932

Location
- Interactive map of Carroll Avenue Bridge

The Carroll Avenue bridge is a triple-span, reinforced concrete, open spandrel arch bridge that bears Maryland Route 195 over Sligo Creek, the Sligo Creek Trail, and the Sligo Creek Parkway in Takoma Park, Maryland.

== Background ==
The first bridge crossing Sligo Creek in the area, a low-level wooden structure, was built to the east of the present bridge in 1878. A reinforced concrete bridge over Sligo Creek was built on the location of the present bridge in 1909, connecting Washington and the Washington Sanatarium, which had been completed in 1907 on the site of what is now Washington Adventist Hospital. The 1909 bridge over Sligo Creek was replaced with the current triple-span, reinforced concrete, open spandrel arch bridge in 1932.

MDSHA rebuilt the bridge in 2015. All elements of the bridge above the arches were replaced in a manner that incorporates modern bridge standards yet maintains the appearance of the bridge as much as possible to retain its eligibility for the National Register of Historic Places. A 2001 bridge eligibility survey by MDSHA for the Maryland Historical Trust determined the bridge may be eligible as it is the only remaining bridge of its type in Montgomery County and one of nine in Maryland.

== See also ==
- Washington Adventist University
