= Maryland Route 384 =

Highway in Maryland, United States

Maryland Route 384
- Colesville Road
- Maryland Route 384 highlighted in red

Route information
- Maintained by MDSHA
- Length: 0.53 mi (850 m)
- Existed: 1929–present

Major junctions
- West end: MD 390 in Silver Spring
- MD 410 in Silver Spring
- East end: US 29 / MD 97 in Silver Spring

Location
- Country: United States
- State: Maryland
- Counties: Montgomery

Highway system
- Maryland highway system; Interstate; US; State; Scenic Byways
← MD 383	→ MD 387

Maryland Route 384 (MD 384) is a state highway in the U.S. state of Maryland. The highway runs 0.53 miles (0.85 km) from MD 390 east to U.S. Route 29 (US 29) and MD 97 within Silver Spring. MD 384 is a six-lane divided highway that forms the southernmost portion of Colesville Road, a major commuting route and one of the two main streets, with Georgia Avenue, within downtown Silver Spring, the commercial hub of southeastern Montgomery County. The state highway also provides access to the Silver Spring station of the Washington Metro, which serves as a transit hub for commuter rail and bus service for the surrounding area. MD 384 and its railroad underpass were constructed in the late 1920s. The highway was expanded to a divided highway in the mid-1970s.

== Route description ==
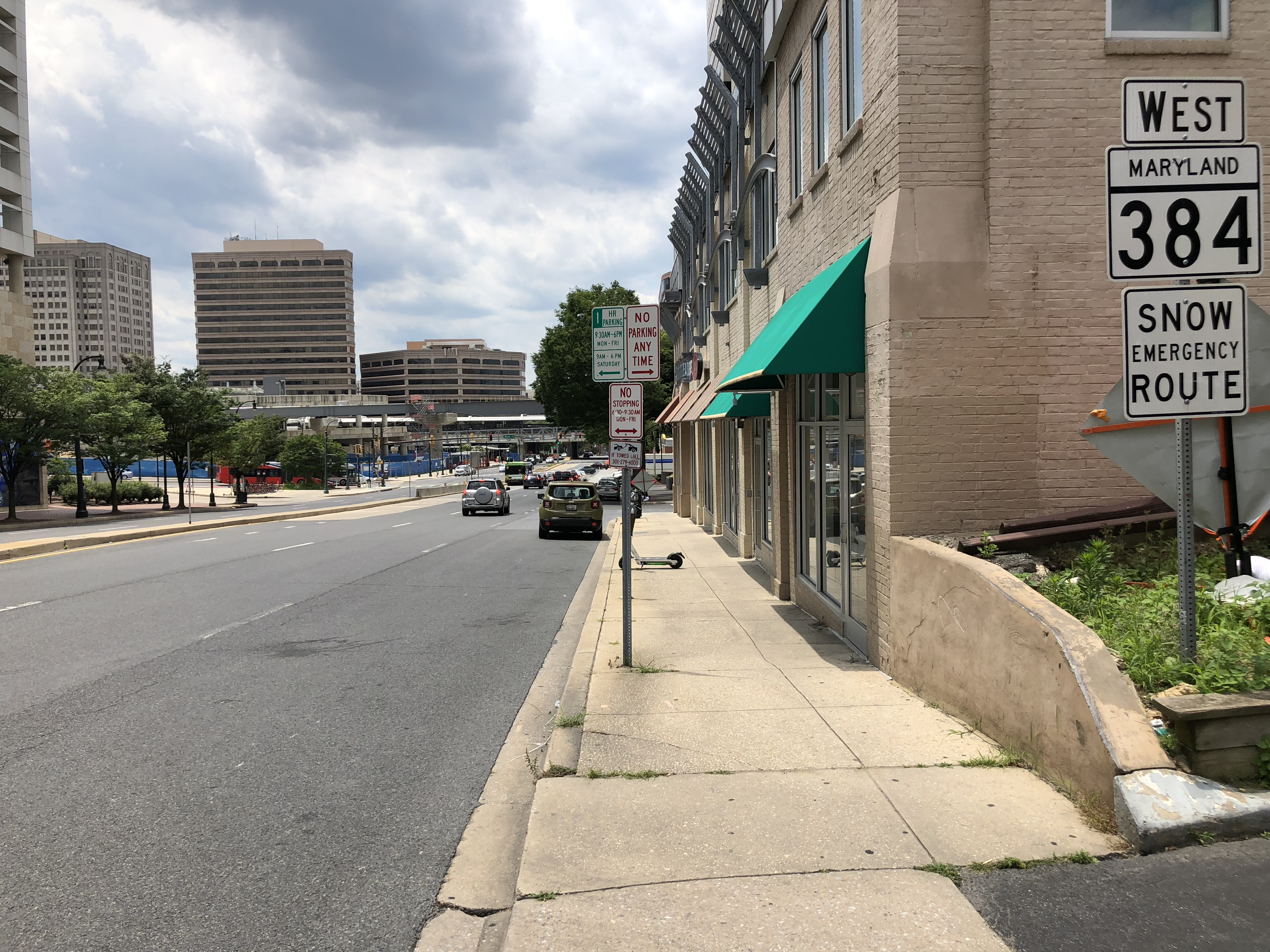
View west at the east end of MD 384 at US 29 and MD 97 in Silver Spring

MD 384 begins at MD 390 (16th Street) at the Blair Portal traffic circle immediately to the north of the boundary between Maryland and the District of Columbia. Traffic on southbound MD 390 must pass around the circle, which also includes Eastern Avenue and North Portal Drive, to access MD 384. MD 384 heads northeast as a six-lane divided highway between high-rise apartment complexes. The highway intersects MD 410 (East–West Highway) adjacent to the Silver Spring offices of the National Oceanic and Atmospheric Administration and the headquarters of the National Weather Service. Beyond MD 410, MD 384 passes under CSX's Metropolitan Subdivision railroad line, which carries MARC's Brunswick Line, and the Washington Metro's Red Line. The highway passes underneath the Silver Spring Metro and MARC stations and immediately to the west of the Paul S. Sarbanes Transit Center, which is a hub for Metrobus, Ride On, and MTA Maryland Commuter Bus service. The Capital Crescent Trail and MTA Maryland's Purple Line will also cross here. East of Wayne Avenue, MD 384 passes Inventa Towers before reaching its terminus at US 29 and MD 97 at the intersection of Colesville Road and Georgia Avenue. US 29 heads north along Colesville Road toward Columbia and south along Georgia Avenue toward Washington, and MD 97 heads north along Georgia Avenue toward Wheaton. There is no direct access from MD 384 to MD 97 or from northbound US 29 to MD 384; those movements are made via Wayne Avenue.

MD 384 is a part of main National Highway System for its entire length.

== History ==
Colesville Road was extended southwest as a concrete road from the intersection of Colesville Road and Georgia Avenue to 16th Street at Blair Portal in 1929. The highway's original underpass of the Baltimore and Ohio Railroad (now CSX) was completed by 1930. Traffic on the new East–West Highway, also built around the same time, used 16th Street and the extended Colesville Road to access Georgia Avenue because the Bethesda–Silver Spring highway was not yet built east of 16th Street. The portion of East–West Highway from 16th Street to Georgia Avenue was completed in 1935. Colesville Road from 16th Street to Georgia Avenue was numbered MD 384 by the time the highway was widened and resurfaced in 1949. MD 384 was expanded to a divided highway in 1975.

== Junction list ==
The entire route is in Silver Spring, Montgomery County.

mi	km	Destinations	Notes
0.00	0.00	MD 390 (16th Street) – Washington, Wheaton	Western terminus; no direct access from southbound MD 390 to MD 384
0.25	0.40	MD 410 (East–West Highway) – Takoma Park, Bethesda	
0.53	0.85	US 29 (Colesville Road) / MD 97 north (Georgia Avenue) – Washington, Columbia	Eastern terminus; southern terminus of MD 97; no direct access from northbound US 29 (Georgia Avenue) to westbound MD 384 or from MD 384 to northbound MD 97
1.000 mi = 1.609 km; 1.000 km = 0.621 mi: Incomplete access
