= U.S. Route 29 in Maryland =

State highway in Maryland, US

U.S. Route 29
- 29th Infantry Division Memorial Highway
- US 29 highlighted in red

Route information
- Maintained by MDSHA
- Length: 25.86 mi (41.62 km)
- Existed: 1934–present

Major junctions
- South end: US 29 at the D.C. border near Silver Spring
- MD 97 / MD 384 in Silver Spring; I-495 near Four Corners; MD 193 in Four Corners; MD 650 in White Oak; MD 200 Toll in Fairland; MD 198 in Burtonsville; MD 32 near Columbia; MD 100 in Ellicott City; US 40 in Ellicott City; I-70 in Ellicott City
- North end: MD 99 in Ellicott City

Location
- Country: United States
- State: Maryland
- Counties: Montgomery, Howard

Highway system
- United States Numbered Highway System; List; Special; Divided; Maryland highway system; Interstate; US; State; Scenic Byways
← MD 28	→ MD 30

U.S. Route 29 (US 29) is a north–south United States Numbered Highway that runs for 1,043.3 miles (1,679.0 km) from Pensacola, Florida, to the western suburbs of Baltimore, Maryland. In the U.S. state of Maryland, US 29 is a major highway that emerges from Washington, D.C. and runs north into eastern Montgomery County, stretching over 25.86 miles (41.62 km) through the state and terminating at Maryland Route 99 (MD 99) outside of Ellicott City. It serves the cities of Columbia and Ellicott City and provides the westernmost north–south route between Washington, D.C. and Baltimore.

US 29 in Maryland was a late addition to the U.S. Numbered Highway System fabricated in 1926, beginning along a corridor once known as MD 27. Since its redesignation, it has been realigned and upgraded many times, now containing freeway and expressway sections.

== Route description ==
=== Georgia Avenue and Colesville Road ===
US 29 emerges from Washington, D.C., along Georgia Avenue. Running alongside the Jessup Blair Park, it intersects MD 410, the East–West Highway, just outside the DC border. It then meets the northern terminus of MD 384 and the southern terminus of MD 97 at a four-way intersection in Silver Spring; US 29 subsequently becomes Colesville Road, taking over from MD 384, while MD 97 continues north as Georgia Avenue.

Crossing Sligo Creek Park, the highway intersects the Sligo Creek Parkway just to the south of the Capital Beltway (Interstate 495, or I-495); a partial cloverleaf interchange between the highways prevents direct access from US 29 south to I-495 east and I-495 west to US 29 north. Now a divided highway, US 29 continues north, intersecting MD 193 just beyond the Capital Beltway; this highway provides access to I-495 that is not available at the aforementioned interchange.

=== Columbia Pike ===
After crossing the Northwest Branch Park, the route is now known as Columbia Pike and remains a six-lane divided expressway. It interchanges with MD 650 to the northwest of the former Naval Ordnance Laboratory. The route passes through Paint Branch Park, over Paint Branch, before meeting East Randolph Road/Cherry Hill Road at a diamond interchange. Continuing northeast, the route intersects Fairland Road then comes to the interchange with MD 200 (Intercounty Connector), before meeting Briggs Chaney Road at a diamond interchange.

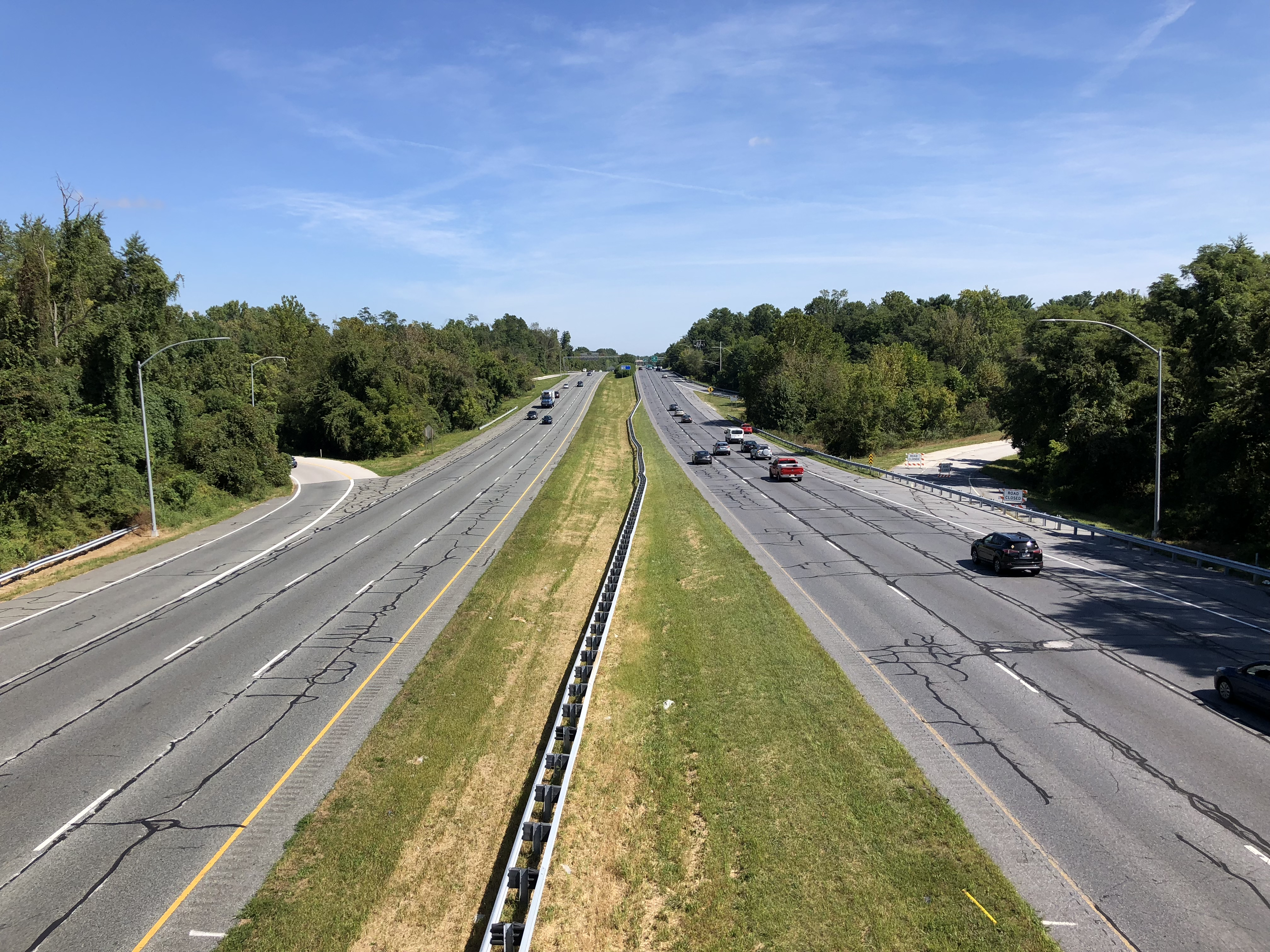
View north along US 29 in Columbia

Running northwest of Fairland Regional Park, US 29 reaches its first major freeway segment at Burtonsville, bypassing a former, heavily curved at-grade expressway portion through the community. At this point, it downgrades into a four-lane divided expressway until it enters Howard County. The bypass incorporates the southern end of the former alignment and a diamond interchange with MD 198 within its southern endpoint; US 29 continues straight ahead through the combined interchange, meeting the northern end of the former alignment at a partial diamond interchange. The 0.92-mile (1.48 km) bypassed section of the old road is officially designated US 29A with street signs that say "Old Columbia Pike", which previously ended at MD 198.

The route crosses Rocky Gorge Reservoir and enters Howard County just beyond the northern end of the bypass. It intersects Old Columbia Road just beyond the reservoir and then upgrades into a six-lane grade-separated almost-freeway within its interchange with MD 216 at Scaggsville. Continuing as an almost-freeway, it interchanges with Johns Hopkins Road after two miles (3.2 km), then downgrades to four lanes again just before the Middle Patuxent River and intersects Rivers Edge Road at a half-signaled intersection. (Rivers Edge Road, which is the sole entryway into a subdivision containing over 300 homes, intersects the southbound carriageway, which has the signals; the northbound carriageway has a signaled turn lane and an unsignaled acceleration lane, both within the median.)

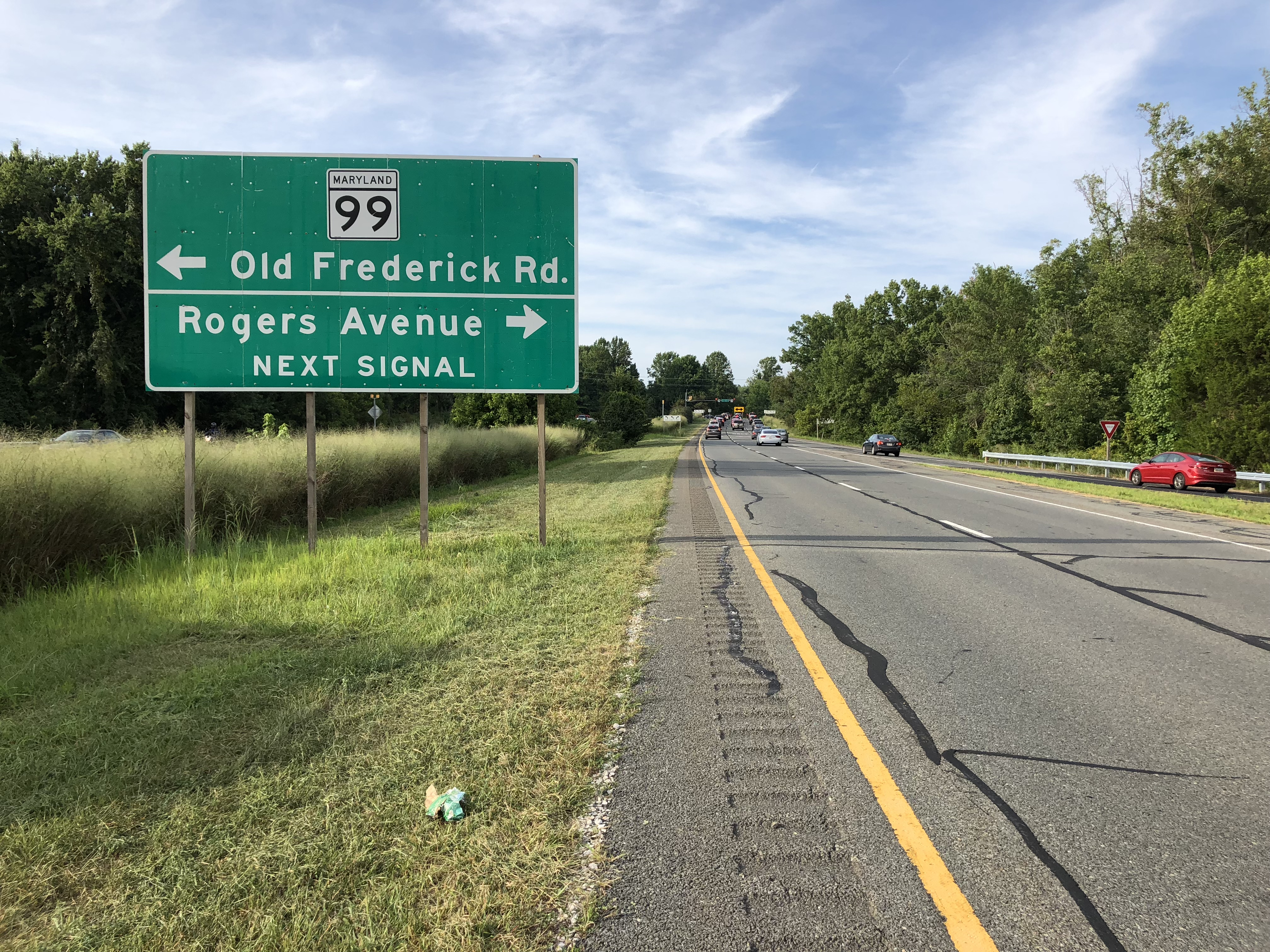
View north toward the northern terminus of US 29 at MD 99 just north of I-70 in Ellicott City

Next, US 29 encounters MD 32 at a symmetrical cloverleaf; for an extended period, this interchange marked the southern end of US 29's grade separation, with the entire route south of there being an at-grade expressway. North of the interchange, US 29 intersects several major routes that serve the community of Columbia: Shaker Drive/Seneca Drive, Broken Land Parkway, MD 175, and MD 108. Between Broken Land Parkway and MD 175, US 29 has a right-in/right-out interchange between the southbound carriageway and South Entrance Road; the northbound carriageway has an at-grade direct turnoff to Gates Lane (and formerly another turnoff to Old Columbia Road). Near the MD 108 interchange, the northbound carriageway has another direct turnoff to Diamondback Drive.

Beyond the MD 108 interchange, US 29 upgrades again into a fully limited-access six-lane grade-separated freeway as it encounters the western terminus of MD 100. The heavy flows to and from MD 100 result in US 29 widening again to eight lanes within the interchange, which also incorporates a three-quarter-diamond interchange with the western terminus of MD 103. The eight-lane segment narrows to six lanes again as it encounters the historic northern end of the US 29 expressway at US 40 within Ellicott City.

Beyond US 40, US 29 interchanges with I-70 at a modified directional cloverleaf and finally terminates at an at-grade intersection with MD 99 near Mount Hebron.

=== 29th Infantry Division Memorial Highway ===
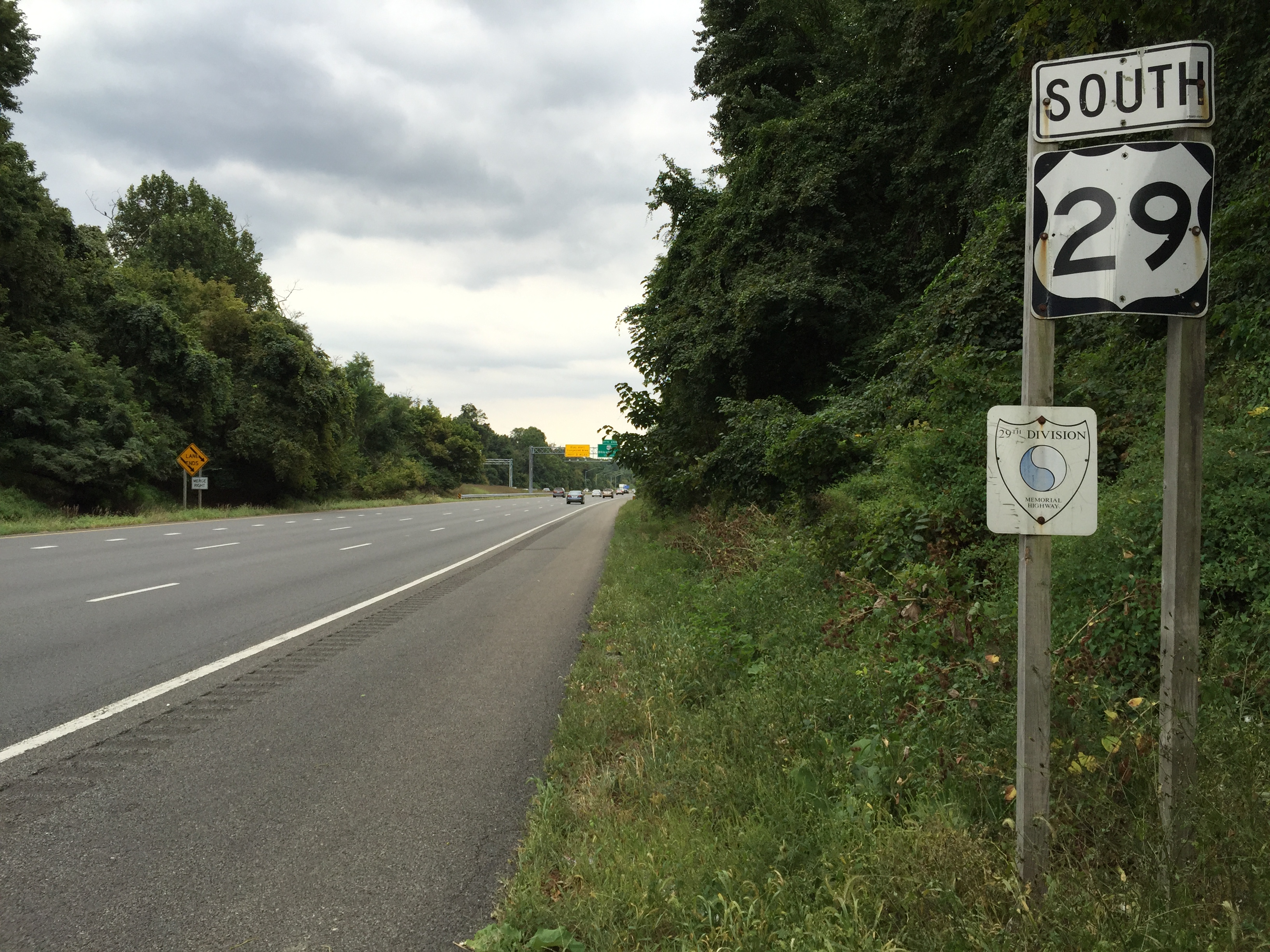
View south along US 29 between I-70 and US 40 in Ellicott City. Note the 29th Infantry Division marker below the route shield.

The entire route in Maryland is also known as the 29th Infantry Division Memorial Highway, and some trailblazer assemblies in the Ellicott City area are marked with the division's distinctive yin-yang symbol. At the US 40 interchange, a monument dedicating the highway to the division has been installed and can be seen from both carriageways.

== History ==
In 1933, the Maryland state government and the DC government approached the American Association of State Highway Officials (AASHO) and the Virginia state government about the possible northern extension of US 29 from its original northern terminus in Culpeper, Virginia, on US 15. After much deliberation, AASHO and Virginia assented to the modifications, and US 29 was extended from Culpeper along US 15 and US 211 into DC and thence into Maryland.

=== Turnpikes ===
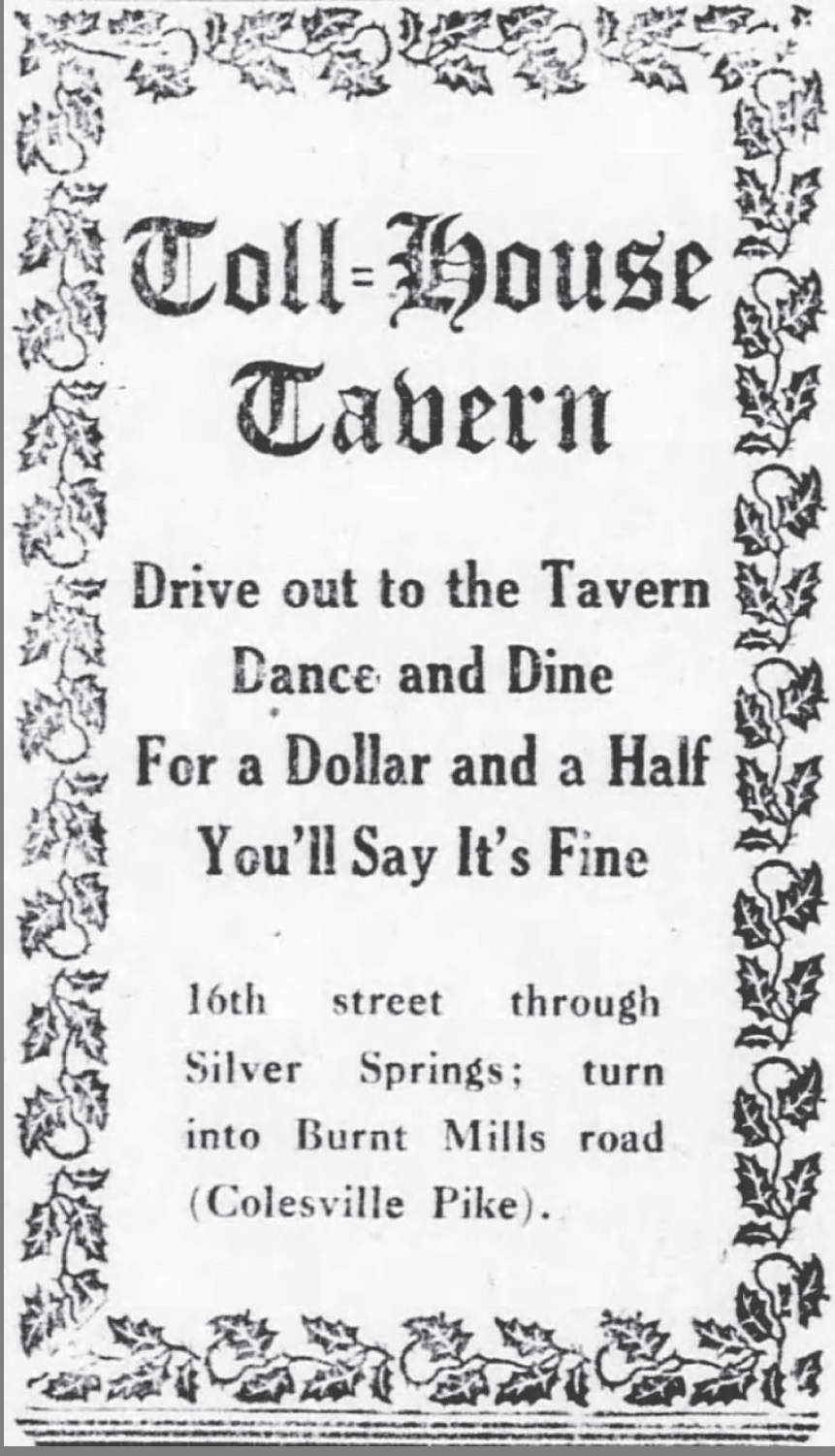
Advertisement for Mrs. K's Toll House Restaurant, Washington Evening Star, October 4, 1924

On January 10, 1810, the Columbia Turnpike Road Company was chartered by the General Assembly of Maryland to "make a turnpike road from where the road leading from Montgomery courthouse to Baltimore intersects the Baltimore and Frederick turnpike road near Ellicott's lower mills, in a direction towards Georgetown, until it intersects the line of the district of Columbia, and so that it shall cross Rock creek at not less than three miles [4.8 km] above Georgetown". The road was managed by the Columbia Turnpike Company and later came to be known as Columbia Pike. In 1835, Columbia Pike surrendered its Montgomery and Anne Arundel (Howard) county roads and bridges to the State of Maryland.

The Washington, Colesville and Ashton Turnpike Company was established in 1870 in Maryland. Its path began at the Washington and Brookeville Turnpike (also known as the Union plank and turnpike road, today's Georgia Avenue), followed the modern path of Colesville Road (US 29) until the crossing of the Northwest Branch at Burnt Mills, where the turnpike took the route of modern Lockwood Drive to join the path of modern New Hampshire Avenue (MD 650) near White Oak north to Colesville and then to Ashton.

"Toll Gate #1" was located just as travelers approached the end of the turnpike at Sligo. The small wooden toll gate, located at the intersection of today’s Colesville Road and Dale Drive, closed in 1910 with the death of its last toll keeper, Henry Charles Ulrich (born 1849). By the mid-1910s, privately run turnpikes had ceased operations with the establishment of Maryland's State Roads Commission. On April 1, 1930, Harvey and Blanche (Mrs. K) Kreuzberg opened Mrs. K's Toll House Restaurant in the toll house (with significant expansion) at 9201 Colesville Road.

=== MD 27 and MD 29 ===
Maryland Route 27
- Location: Silver Spring–Ellicott City
- Existed: 1927–1934

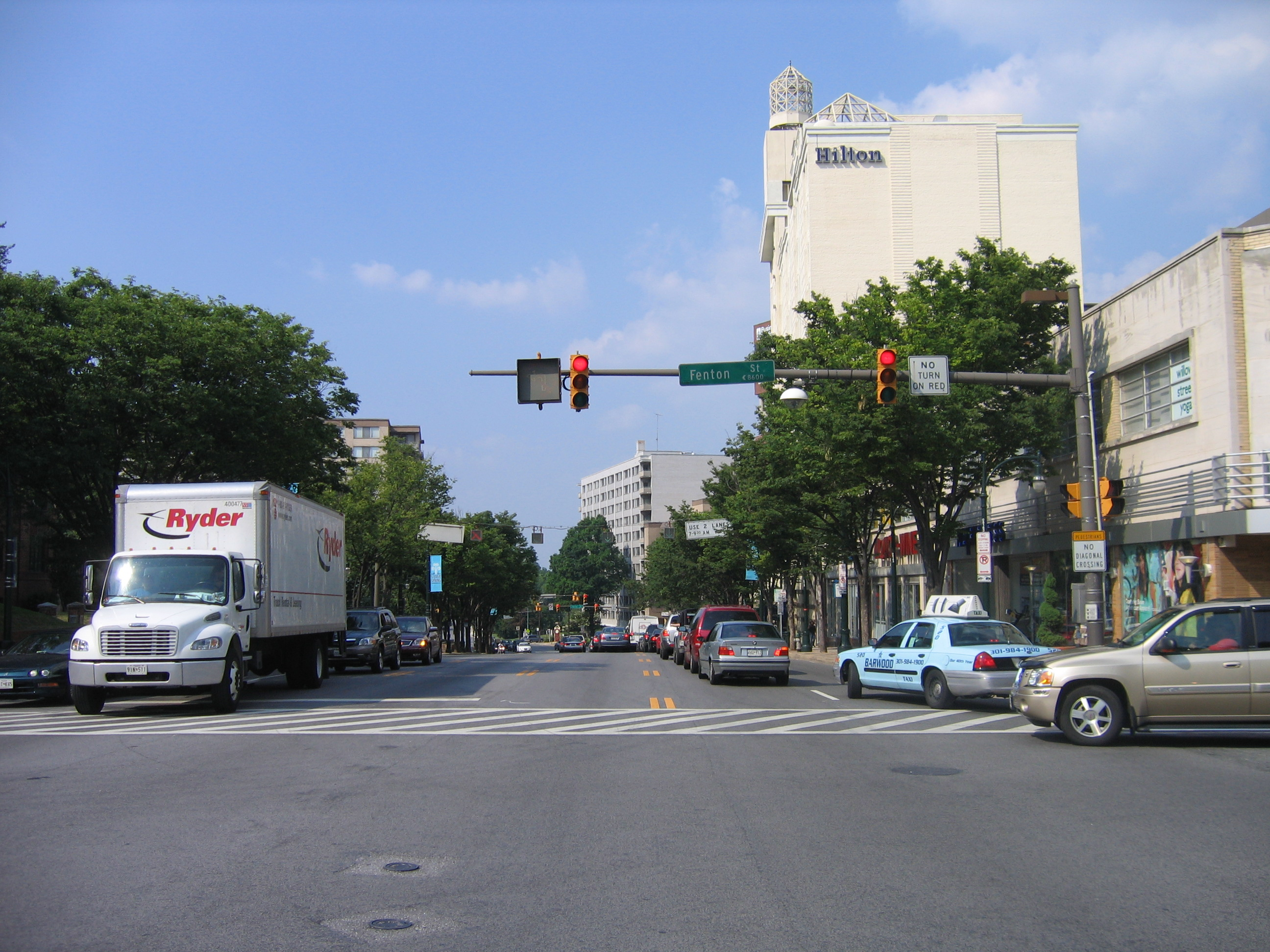
US 29 as Colesville Road in Silver Spring

US 29 arrived in Maryland in 1934, a year after the initial creation of the Maryland highway numbering scheme. US 29 followed a route initially designated as Maryland Route 27 (MD 27), while today's MD 27 was designated as Maryland Route 29 (MD 29). The first MD 27 emerged from Washington, D.C. along Colesville Road, then followed US 29's existing route as far as White Oak, where it turned north along MD 650 and followed its alignment as far as Ashton. This route had previously been the Washington, Colesville and Ashton Turnpike. At Ashton, MD 27 then turned east along MD 108 and followed its alignment through Clarksville (overlapping MD 32 before 1996) until it reached an intersection with Columbia Road, just to the west of MD 108's current interchange with US 29's current route. Then, MD 27 turned north and followed Columbia Road (formerly designated MD 982), becoming Old Columbia Pike (formerly designated as MD 987) after crossing MD 103 and continuing north until reaching Main Street (old US 40) in old Ellicott City, where it ended.

After US 29's arrival in 1934, MD 27 and MD 29 swapped numbers; today's MD 27 received its current designation and did not physically change, while the original MD 27 was redesignated MD 29, and then immediately promoted to US 29, thus removing a conflict between the U.S. Highway number and the state highway number system, as AASHO prohibits number duplication between state and U.S. highway systems. US 29 followed MD 29's route all the way into Ellicott City, where it then turned east and overlapped US 40 through Catonsville all the way into Baltimore, where it ended at US 1 (Monroe Street) in southwestern Baltimore. Today, the Baltimore County portion of this route is part of MD 144.

=== U.S. Route 29 Alternate ===
On November 11, 1954, the state of Maryland gained AASHO's consent to divert US 29 to a more direct alignment, paralleling the now-defunct MD 196 between MD 650 and MD 198 and then continuing onward to Ellicott City via Scaggsville.

The diversion of the route necessitated the construction of a divided highway between the site of US 29's current interchange with MD 650 in White Oak and an intersection with MD 198 in Burtonsville, and a two-lane highway between Burtonsville, across the Patuxent River at the site of future Rocky Gorge Reservoir, through Scaggsville and Columbia (then a small village east of today's US 29/MD 108 interchange) to a point south of Ellicott City, where the new route merged with the original route near the site of the US 29/MD 103 interchange and continued as normal. It is unclear if the new route was immediately signed as US 29 or as an extension of MD 196, but an undated GULF map of the state of Maryland shows no highway designation for the route between White Oak and Columbia. The first new segment of the current route of US 29 opened on November 30, 1959, and, by 1964, MD 196 had been retracted to Burtonsville and US 29 had been rerouted to its current route.

Initially, the AASHO Executive Committee, meeting in Seattle, Washington, designated US 29's original route via Ashton as U.S. Route 29 Alternate (US 29 Alt.), which would be signed upon the originally scheduled completion of the direct route in late 1955. US 29 Alt. has since vanished, being replaced with a northward extension of MD 650 through Ashton (replacing MD 116 north of Ashton) and an eastward extension of MD 108 as far as MD 175 Waterloo Road (now itself part of MD 108).

=== New Columbia Pike ===
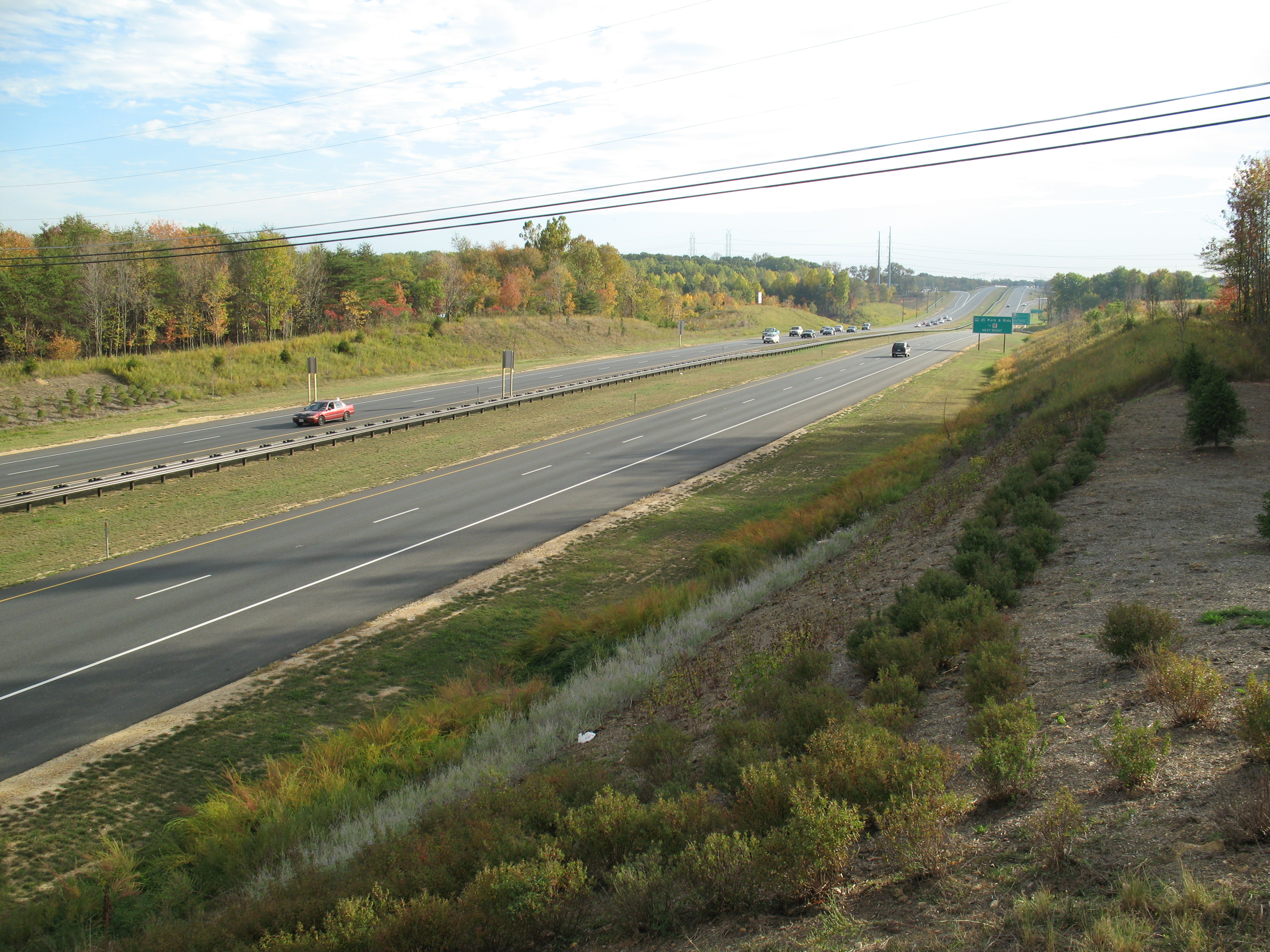
US 29 in Burtonsville

The 1966 expansion of the tiny village of Columbia into a massive planned community under the auspices of The Rouse Company led to the construction of modern Columbia Pike. By the early 1970s, with the completion of new Columbia Pike, a four-lane divided at-grade highway, between Burtonsville and US 40, US 29 had assumed its current shape. The Regal Construction Company completed a section south of MD 108 in June 1970 at a cost of $1.1 million per mile ($0.68 million/km; equivalent to $6.84 million per mile [$4.3 million/km] in 2024). In 1968, the terminus of US 29 was diverted away from Baltimore; it was retracted to US 40 in Ellicott City and then moved north two miles (3.2 km) to MD 99, and an interchange similar to the one in place between US 29 and US 40 was built to connect the route with I-70 (then designated I-70N).

=== US 29 freeway ===
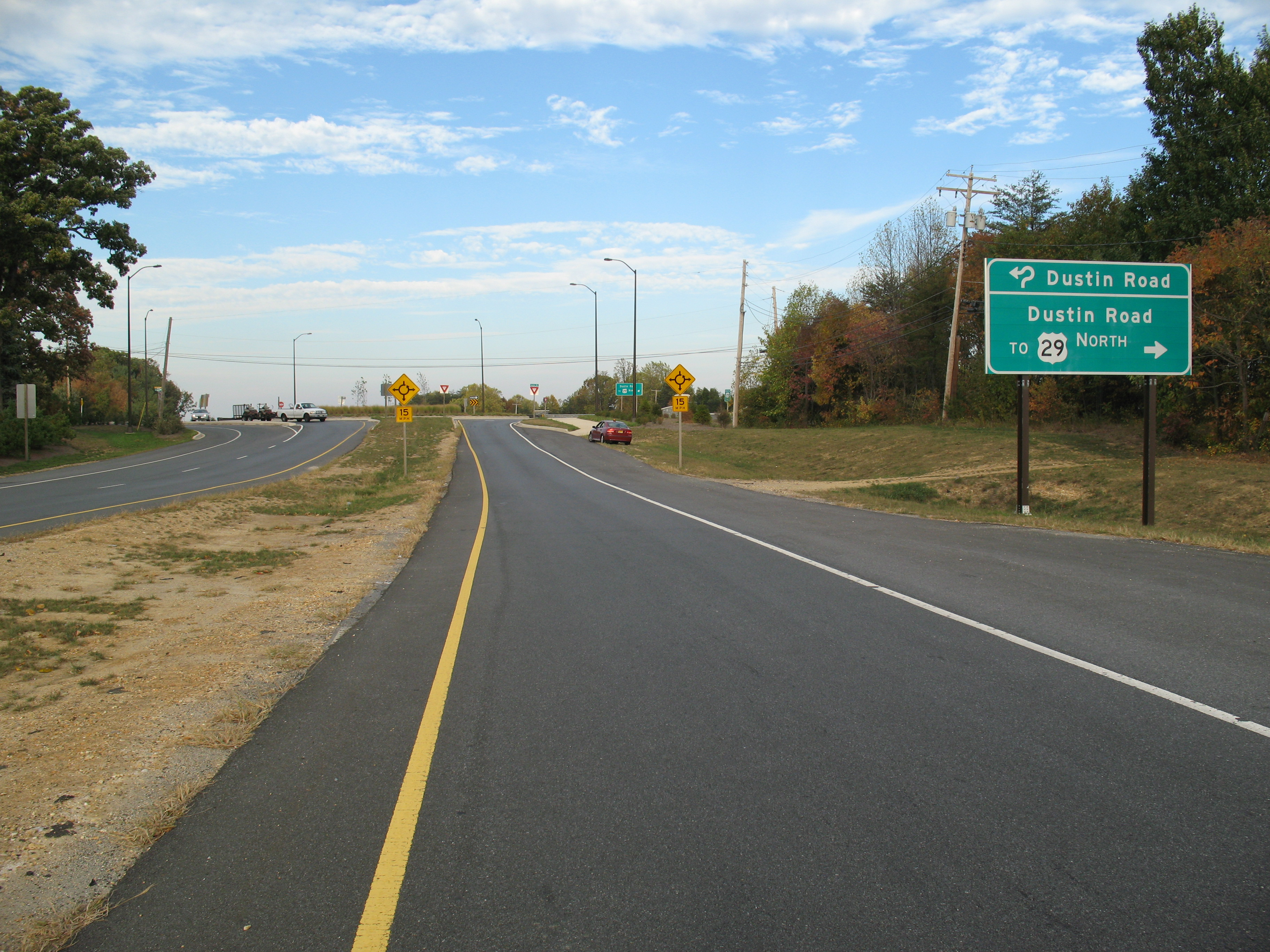
US 29A in Burtonsville

Initially, the northernmost two miles (3.2 km) of US 29 were the only grade-separated limited-access segment of that route in Maryland. Starting with Howard County's segment in the late 1980s and continuing to the 2000s in Montgomery County, gradual construction of interchanges south of US 40, however, has resulted in a full freeway between I-70 and MD 108, an almost-freeway between MD 108 and MD 216, and a partially grade-separated expressway between MD 216 and MD 650, with interchanges at Johns Hopkins Road and MD 216 completed in the early 2000s. Interchanges were completed in 2004 at MD 198, in 2005 at E. Randolph Road/Cherry Hill Road, and in 2007 at Briggs Chaney Road. With the completion of the interchange at MD 198, US 29 was realigned slightly to the east. The former alignment is now designated as US 29A. Immediately south of Briggs Chaney Road, construction commenced on a new interchange with MD 200 (Intercounty Connector) in 2008.

=== Baltimore Outer Beltway ===
The four miles (6.4 km) of the US 29 freeway between MD 100 and I-70 is part of the Baltimore Outer Beltway. The Outer Beltway was perceived as a three-quarter circular beltway designed to provide a route parallel to the Baltimore Beltway. MD 100 represents the major portion that was built; the aforementioned four miles (6.4 km) of US 29 is another portion. The Baltimore Outer Beltway was projected beyond MD 99 to run through Howard and Baltimore counties and intersect MD 140, I-83, US 1, and I-95 before terminating at US 40 northeast of Baltimore.

== Future ==
Future plans under study would eliminate all traffic lights between Rivers Edge Road and Stewart Lane. An interchange would be created at Greencastle Road, and all communities in the Blackburn Road area would be linked to Greencastle Road. Overpasses would be created over US 29 on Fairland and Musgrove roads with possible interchanges created. In the absence of interchanges, access is possible to these areas via Briggs Chaney or Randolph roads. Overpasses would be built on Industrial Parkway and Tech Road with ramps to Old Columbia Pike on either side. An underpass would be built on Stewart Lane with ramps to Old Columbia Pike and Milestone Drive. This construction would enable US 29 to have the structure of a freeway from all points north of New Hampshire Avenue. The route would also be widened to a minimum of six lanes on all parts of this stretch. This endeavor would require the reconstruction of several overpasses and underpasses and the expansion of the bridge over the Patuxent River.

== Junction list ==
County	Location	mi	km	Exit	Destinations	Notes
Montgomery	Silver Spring	0.0	0.0		US 29 south (Georgia Avenue) / Eastern Avenue west / Blair Road south – Washington	District of Columbia boundary; southern terminus of US 29 in Maryland
Montgomery	Silver Spring	0.2	0.32		MD 410 (East–West Highway/Burlington Avenue) / 13th Street south – Takoma Park, Bethesda	Five-way intersection; no direct access from southbound US 29 to eastbound MD 410 or from eastbound MD 410 to northbound US 29
Montgomery	Silver Spring	0.7	1.1		Wayne Avenue (MD 594 east)	Officially MD 594A
Montgomery	Silver Spring	0.8	1.3		MD 97 north (Georgia Avenue) / MD 384 west (Colesville Road) – Wheaton, Washington	US 29 turns east onto Colesville Road; no direct access from northbound US 29 to westbound MD 384, eastbound MD 384 to northbound MD 97, or southbound MD 97 to northbound US 29
Montgomery	Silver Spring	1.7	2.7		Sligo Creek Parkway	
Montgomery	Silver Spring	2.4	3.9		I-495 (Capital Beltway) – College Park, Baltimore, Bethesda, Northern Virginia	I-495 Exit 30; no access from southbound US 29 to eastbound I-495 or from westbound I-495 to northbound US 29
Montgomery	Silver Spring	2.7	4.3		MD 193 (University Boulevard) to I-495 east – Wheaton, Langley Park	
Montgomery	White Oak	4.8	7.7		MD 650 (New Hampshire Avenue) – Colesville, Washington	Partial cloverleaf interchange
Montgomery	Fairland	6.9	11.1		Randolph Road / Cherry Hill Road	Single-point urban interchange; Randolph Road and Cherry Hill Road are unsigned MD 929A and MD 929B, respectively
Montgomery	Fairland	7.7	12.4		Fairland Road	Southbound US 29 uses exit ramp to access Fairland Road
Montgomery	Fairland	8.0	12.9		MD 200 Toll (Intercounty Connector) to I-95 / I-270	MD 200 Exit 16; E-ZPass or Video Tolling
Montgomery	Fairland	8.5	13.7		Briggs Chaney Road	Partial cloverleaf interchange
Montgomery	Burtonsville	10.2	16.4		Blackburn Road	Northbound US 29 uses exit ramp to access Blackburn Road; southbound US 29 uses US 29A
Montgomery	Burtonsville	10.7	17.2		MD 198 (Sandy Spring Road) – Laurel, Burtonsville	No exit southbound
Montgomery	Burtonsville	11.0	17.7		Park & Ride to Metro	Southbound exit and entrance
Montgomery	Burtonsville	11.5	18.5		To MD 198 / Columbia Pike / Dustin Road – Laurel, Burtonsville	Southbound exit, northbound entrance; Columbia Pike is US 29A; Dustin Road is MD 929F
Howard	North Laurel	13.6	21.9	13	MD 216 (Scaggsville Road) – Fulton, Laurel	
Howard	North Laurel	14.8	23.8	15	Johns Hopkins Road to Gorman Road	
Howard	Columbia	16.6	26.7	16	MD 32 (Patuxent Freeway) – Fort Meade, Clarksville	MD 32 Exit 16; split into exits 16A (east) and 16B (west)
Howard	Columbia	17.2	27.7	17	Seneca Drive / Shaker Drive	
Howard	Columbia	18.2	29.3	18	Broken Land Parkway – Columbia Town Center, Oakland Mills, Owen Brown	Split into exits 18A (south) and 18B (north) northbound; Owen Brown signed northbound
Howard	Columbia	18.6	29.9		South Entrance Road – Merriweather Post Pavilion	Right-in/right-out interchange southbound; no northbound exit
Howard	Columbia	20.0	32.2	20	MD 175 east / Little Patuxent Parkway west – Columbia Town Center, Jessup	Northbound, one exit; southbound, split into exits 20A (MD 175) and 20B (Little Patuxent Parkway)
Howard	Columbia	20.6	33.2		Diamondback Drive	Right-in/right-out interchange northbound; no southbound exit
Howard	Columbia	21.1	34.0	21	MD 108 (Clarksville Pike/Old Annapolis Road) – Clarksville	Split into exits 21A (east) and 21B (west)
Howard	Ellicott City	22.3	35.9	22	MD 100 east – Glen Burnie	Western terminus of MD 100
Howard	Ellicott City	22.5	36.2	23	MD 103 (St. Johns Lane)	No northbound exit
Howard	Ellicott City	24.1	38.8	24	US 40 (Baltimore National Pike) – Ellicott City	Split into exits 24A (east) and 24B (west)
Howard	Ellicott City	25.4	40.9	25	I-70 – Baltimore, Frederick	I-70 Exit 87; split into exits 25A (east) and 25B (west)
Howard	Ellicott City	25.9	41.7		MD 99 west (Old Frederick Road) / Rogers Avenue east	Northern terminus of US 29
1.000 mi = 1.609 km; 1.000 km = 0.621 mi: Electronic toll collection; Incomplete access

== See also ==
U.S. Route 29
Previous state: District of Columbia	Maryland	Next state: Terminus
