= Brian McLaren =

American pastor and author (born 1956)

The Reverend Brian D. McLaren
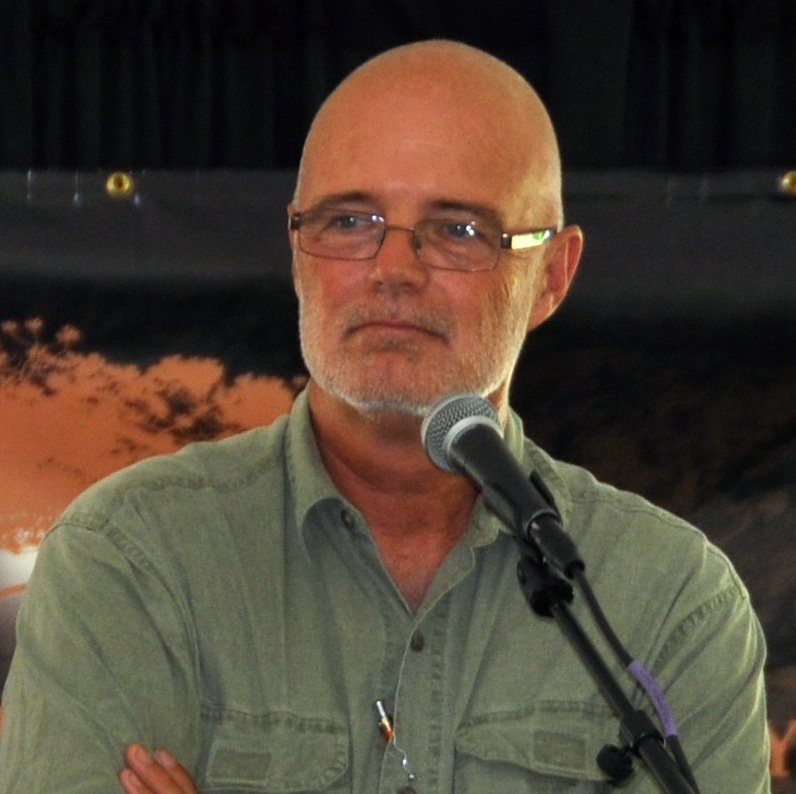
- McLaren in 2012
- Born: 1956 (age 69–70)
- Education: University of Maryland

Ecclesiastical career
- Religion: Christianity
- Congregations: Cedar Ridge Community Church, Spencerville, Maryland (1982–2006)

Brian D. McLaren (born 1956) is an American author, speaker, activist, public theologian and was a leading figure in the emerging church movement. McLaren is often associated with postmodern Christianity.

== Education and career ==
Raised in Rockville, Maryland, in the conservative Open Brethren, part of the Plymouth Brethren, McLaren became attracted to the countercultural Jesus Movement in the 1970s. He is a faculty member and Dean of Faculty for the Centre for Action and Contemplation.

McLaren attended the University of Maryland where he received both a B.A. (1978) and M.A. (1981) He holds an honorary Doctor of Divinity from Carey Theological Seminary, Vancouver. In 2010 he was awarded an honorary doctorate from Virginia Theological Seminary (Episcopal).

From 1978 to 1986 McLaren taught college English. He helped form Cedar Ridge Community Church, a non-denominational church in Spencerville, Maryland, in 1982. He was founding pastor and served in that capacity until 2006. The church eventually grew to include 500 members.

In 2011, McLaren defended Rob Bell's controversial book Love Wins against critiques from figures such as Albert Mohler, who argued that Bell advocated universalism.

In 2013, McLaren stated that he did not believe homosexual conduct to be sinful.

In 2015, McLaren was recognized by Time magazine as one of the 25 Most Influential Evangelicals in America.

== Personal life ==
McLaren is married and has four children and five grandchildren. In September 2012, McLaren led a commitment ceremony for his son Trevor and partner Owen Ryan at the Audubon Naturalist Society in Chevy Chase, Maryland.

== Publications ==
=== Children's Books ===
- Brian D. McLaren; Gareth Higgins (2023). Cory and the Seventh Story. Illustrated by Anita Schmidt. New York: Crown.

=== Sole-authored Books ===
- More Ready Than You Realize: The Power of Everyday Conversations. Grand Rapids: Zondervan. 2002.
- Finding Faith: A Self-discovery Guide for Your Spiritual Quest. Grand Rapids: Zondervan. 1999.
- The Church on the Other Side: Doing Ministry in a Postmodern Matrix. Grand Rapids: Zondervan. 2003.
- The Secret Message of Jesus: Uncovering the Truth that Could Change Everything. Nashville: Thomas Nelson. 2006.
- Everything Must Change: When the World's Biggest Problems and Jesus' Good News Collide. Nashville: Thomas Nelson. 2009.
- A New Kind of Christianity: Ten Questions that are Transforming the Faith. San Francsico: HarperOne. 2010.
- Naked Spirituality: A Life with God in 12 Simple Words. San Francsico: HarperOne. 2011.
- Why Did Jesus, Moses, the Buddha, and Mohammed Cross the Road? Christian Identity in a Multi-Faith World. London: Hodder & Stoughton. 2012.
- The Story We Find Ourselves In: Further Adventures of a New Kind of Christian. London: SPCK. 2013.
- We Make the Road by Walking: A Year-Long Quest for Spiritual Formation, Reorientation, and Activation. Jericho Books. 2014.
- Seeking Aliveness: Daily Reflections on a New Way to Experience and Practise the Christian Faith. Londo: Hodder & Stoughton. 2017.
- The Great Spiritual Migration: How the World's Largest Religion Is Seeking a Better Way to Be Christian. Colorado Springs: Convergent. 2016.
- Faith After Doubt: Why Your Beliefs Stopped Working and What to Do About it. Edinburgh: John Murray Press. 2021.
- Do I Stay Christian?: A Guide for the Doubters, the Disappointed, and the Disillusioned. London: Hodder & Stoughton. 2022.
- Life After Doom: Wisdom and Courage for a World Falling Apart. London: Hachette. 2024.

=== Co-authored books ===
- Leonard Sweet; Brian D. McLaren; Jerry Haselmayer (2003). A is for Abductive: The Language of the Emerging Church. Grand Rapids: Zondervan.
- Brian D. McLaren; Gareth Higgins (2019). The Seventh Story: Us, Them, and the End of Violence. Porch.

=== Books part of a Series ===
- Brian D. McLaren; Tony Campolo (2003). Adventures in Missing the Point: How the Culture-Controlled Church Neutered the Gospel. Emergent YS. Grand Rapids: Zondervan.
- Andy Crouch; Michael Horton; Frederica Mathewes-Green; Brian D. McLaren; Erwin Raphael McManus (2003). Leoard Sweet (ed.). The Church in Emerging Culture: Five Perspectives. Emergent YS. Grand Rapids: Zondervan.
- A Generous Orthodoxy: Why I am a missional + evangelical + post/protestant + liberal/conservative + mystical/poetic + biblical + charismatic/contemplative + fundamentalist/Calvinist + anabaptist/Anglican + Methodist + catholic + green + incarnational + depressed-yet-hopeful + emergent + unfinished Christian. Emergent YS. Grand Rapids: Zondervan. 2006.
- Brian D. McLaren; Chris Seay (2006). The Dust off Their Feet: Lessons from the First Church. The Voice. Nashville: Thomas Nelson.
- Brian D. McLaren; Chris Seay (2007). The Voice of Luke: Not Even Sandals. Nashville: Thomas Nelson.
- Finding Faith: A Search for What is Real. Grand Rapids: Zondervan. 2007.
- Finding Faith: A Search for What Makes Sense. Grand Rapids: Zondervan. 2007.
- A New Kind of Christian: A Tale of Two Friends on a Spiritual Journey. Jossey Bass Leadership Network. Hoboken: Jossey Bass. 2008.
- The Last Word and the Word After That: A Tale of Faith, Doubt, and a New Kind of Christianity. Jossey Bass Leadership Network. Hoboken: Jossey Bass. 2008.
- Brian D. McLaren; Phyllis Tickle (2010). Finding Our Way Again: The Return of the Ancient Practices. Nashville: Thomas Nelson.
- The Galapagos Islands: A Spiritual Journey. On Location. Minneapolis: Fortress Press. 2019.

=== Co-edited volumes ===
- Brian McLaren; Elisa Padilla; Ashley Bunting Seeber, eds. (2009). The Justice Project. Emersion: Emergent Village resources for communities of faith. Ada: Baker.

== See also ==
- Progressive Christianity
- Emerging church
- Postmodern Christianity
- Frederick Buechner

== Critical references ==
- Carson, D. A. Becoming Conversant with the Emerging Church. Grand Rapids, Michigan Zondervan, 2005.
- Erickson, Millard. Postmodernizing the Faith: Evangelical Responses to the Challenge of Postmodernism. Grand Rapids, Michigan: Baker Books, 1998.
- ________; Helseth, Paul Kjoss; and Taylor, Justin eds. Reclaiming the Center: Confronting Evangelical Accommodation in Postmodern Times. Wheaton, Illinois: Crossway Books, 2004.
- Smith, R. Scott. Truth and the New Kind of Christian: The Emerging Effects of Postmodernism in the Church. Wheaton, Illinois: Crossway Books, 2005.
