= Maryland Route 198 =

State highway in Maryland, United States

Maryland Route 198
- Maryland Route 198 highlighted in red

Route information
- Maintained by MDSHA
- Length: 14.14 mi (22.76 km)
- Existed: 1927–present

Major junctions
- West end: MD 650 near Spencerville
- US 29 in Burtonsville; I-95 in Laurel; MD 216 in Laurel; US 1 in Laurel; MD 197 in Laurel; Baltimore–Washington Parkway in Maryland City; MD 32 in Fort Meade
- East end: Mapes Road at Fort Meade

Location
- Country: United States
- State: Maryland
- Counties: Montgomery, Prince George's, Anne Arundel

Highway system
- Maryland highway system; Interstate; US; State; Scenic Byways
← MD 197	→ MD 200

Maryland Route 198 (MD 198) is a state highway in the U.S. state of Maryland. The highway runs 14.14 miles (22.76 km) from MD 650 near Spencerville east to the entrance of Fort George G. Meade beyond its junction with MD 32. MD 198 connects Laurel in far northern Prince George's County with the northeastern Montgomery County communities of Spencerville and Burtonsville and Maryland City and Fort Meade in western Anne Arundel County. The highway is a four-to-six-lane divided highway between U.S. Route 29 (US 29) in Burtonsville and the Baltimore–Washington Parkway in Maryland City.

MD 198 was constructed from US 1 in Laurel west toward Burtonsville in the early 1920s and completed in the late 1920s. Another section was built in Spencerville in the late 1920s; the two segments were connected in the mid-1950s. The Laurel–Fort Meade road was built as MD 602 for military access purposes in the mid-1940s, replacing the original highway between the two locations, MD 216. MD 198 was relocated through Laurel and extended east along MD 602 to Fort Meade in the early 1960s. The first divided highway portion of the highway was part of a relocation at the Interstate 95 (I-95) interchange in the early 1970s. The divided highway was extended west to Burtonsville in the mid-1980s and through Maryland City in the late 1980s. MD 198's eastern end was extended to MD 32 in the early 1990s and then moved again for its interchange with that highway in the early 2000s. The Maryland State Highway Administration (MDSHA) plans to expand the remaining two-lane portions of MD 198 to a divided highway.

== Route description ==
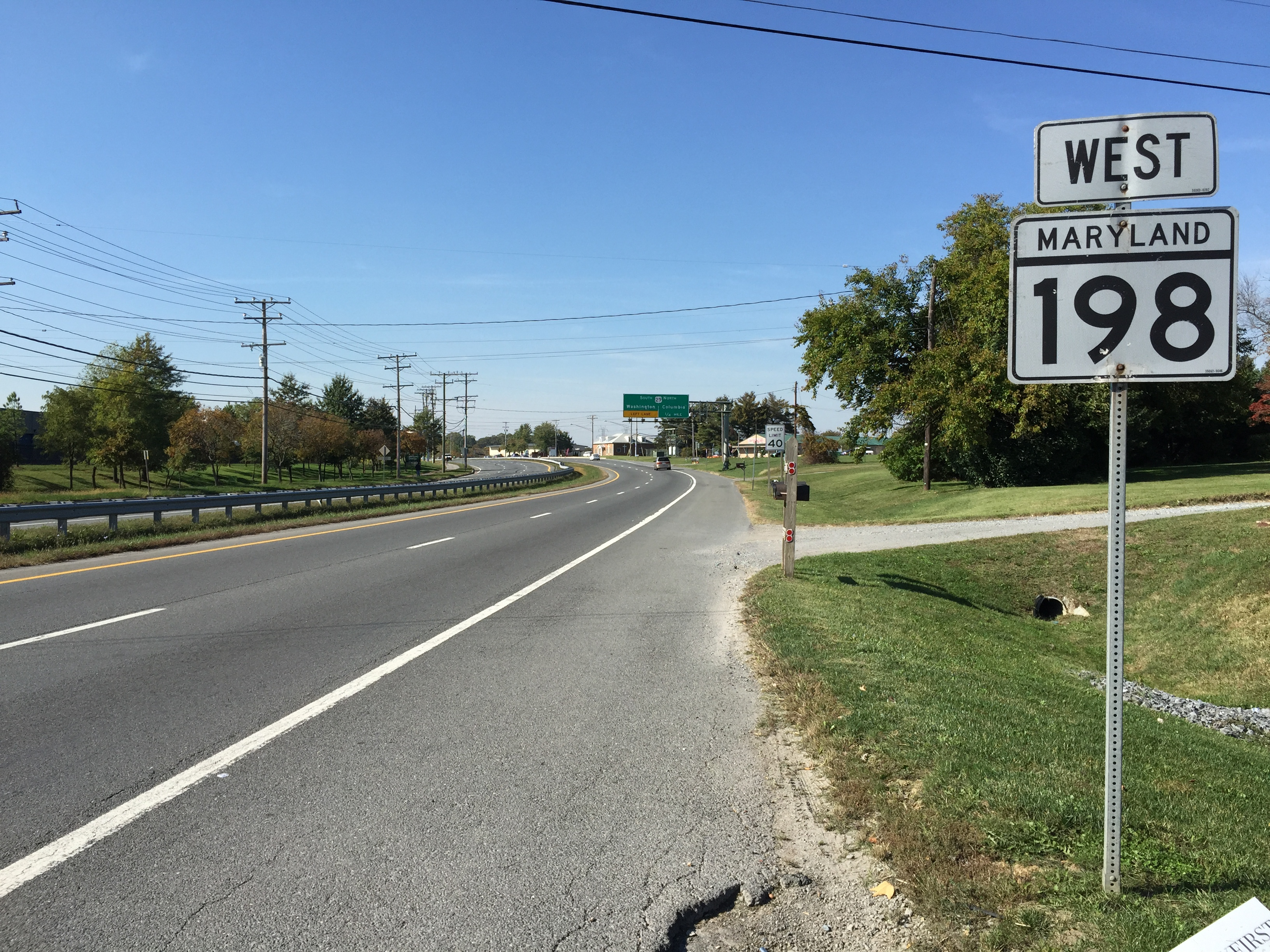
View west along MD 198 just east of US 29 in Burtonsville

MD 198 begins at a four-legged intersection with MD 650 (New Hampshire Avenue) west of Spencerville. The west leg of the intersection is county-maintained Norbeck Road, which leads west to MD 28. MD 198 heads east as two-lane undivided Spencerville Road through an intersection with Good Hope Road and passes through the village of Spencerville. At the western edge of Burtonsville, the highway expands to a four-lane undivided highway and has a three-way intersection with Old Columbia Pike and takes on that name. MD 198 expands to a six-lane divided highway just west of its three-quarter diamond interchange with US 29 (Columbia Pike). Access from southbound US 29 to MD 198 is provided via Old Columbia Pike, a bypassed segment of US 29 that intersects MD 198 opposite the ramp from MD 198 to southbound US 29.

MD 198 continues east as Sandy Spring Road, which drops to four lanes as the road leaves Burtonsville. The route crosses the Montgomery–Prince George's county line and temporarily expands to six lanes between the intersection with Old Gunpowder Road and Bond Mill Road and the state highway's junction with I-95 in West Laurel. The junction is a cloverleaf interchange with a flyover ramp from westbound MD 198 to southbound I-95. MD 198 again becomes six lanes at the east end of the interchange where the highway enters the city of Laurel. At Ninth Street, the state highway splits into a one-way pair that uses Gorman Avenue eastbound and Talbott Avenue westbound. MD 198 meets the eastern end of MD 216 (Seventh Street) and intersects US 1, which comprises a one-way pair that uses Washington Boulevard southbound and Second Street northbound. East of US 1, Gorman and Talbott avenues come together to form Fort Meade Road, a six-lane divided highway that crosses over CSX's Capital Subdivision railroad line, which carries MARC's Camden Line.

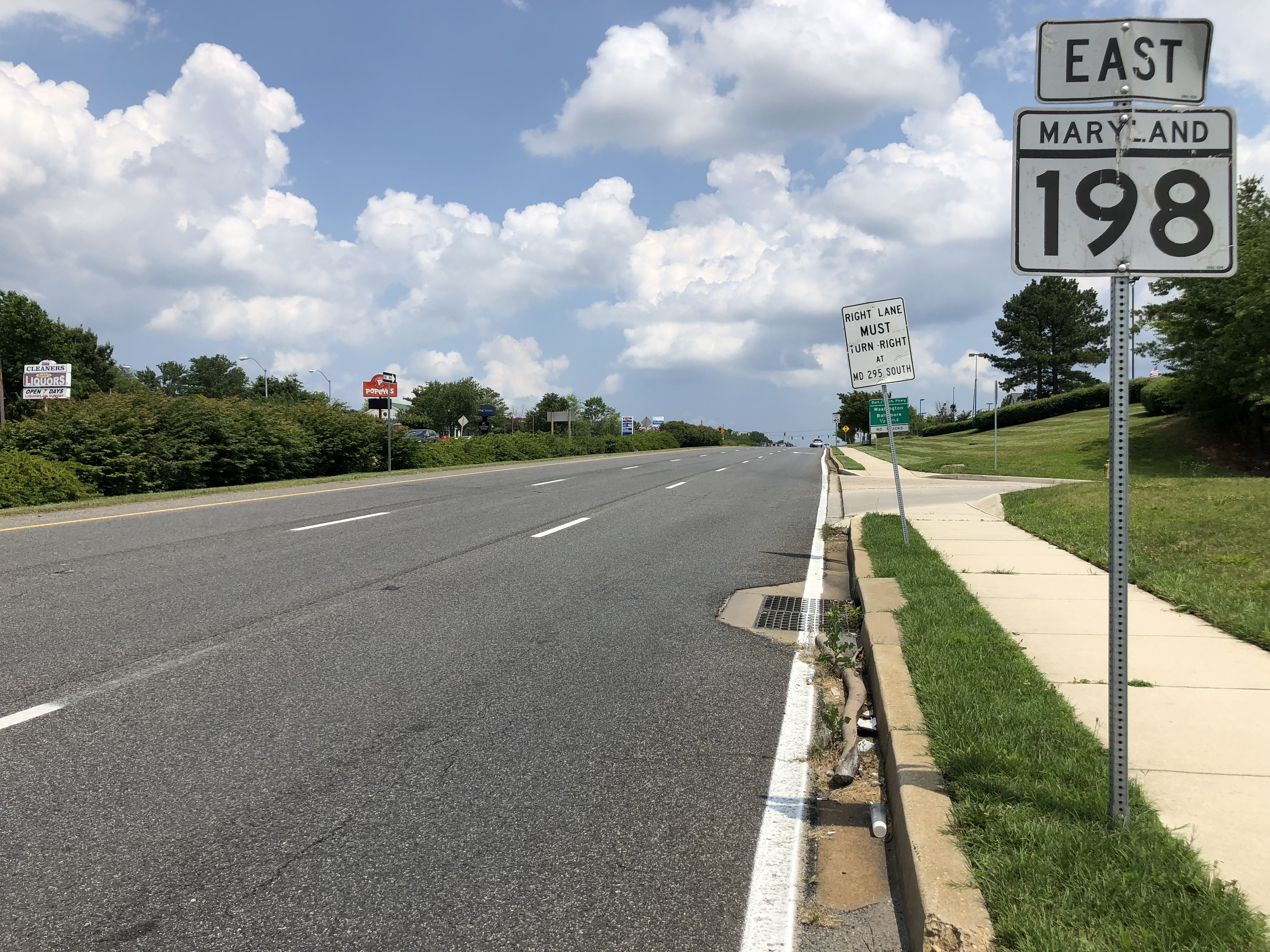
View east along MD 198 approaching the interchange with the Baltimore–Washington Parkway in Maryland City

MD 198 curves northeast and meets the northern end of MD 197 (Laurel Bowie Road) before crossing the Patuxent River, where the route leaves the city of Laurel and enters Anne Arundel County. The highway, now named Laurel Fort Meade Road, passes one of the main entrances to Laurel Park Racecourse and passes through Maryland City. MD 198 drops to four lanes at its partial cloverleaf interchange with the Baltimore–Washington Parkway (unsigned MD 295) and then becomes a two-lane undivided road a short distance east of the interchange. The state highway crosses the Little Patuxent River, then curves southeast and expands to a four-lane divided highway as it parallels MD 32 (Patuxent Freeway). At the entrance to Tipton Airport, MD 198 curves north and meets MD 32 at a dumbbell interchange. The highway passes through an S-curve before it reaches its eastern terminus at an entrance to Fort Meade. The road continues into the military installation as Mapes Road.

MD 198 is a part of the National Highway System for its entire length. The highway is an intermodal connector between I-95 and US 1. The remainder of the highway is a National Highway System principal arterial.

== History ==
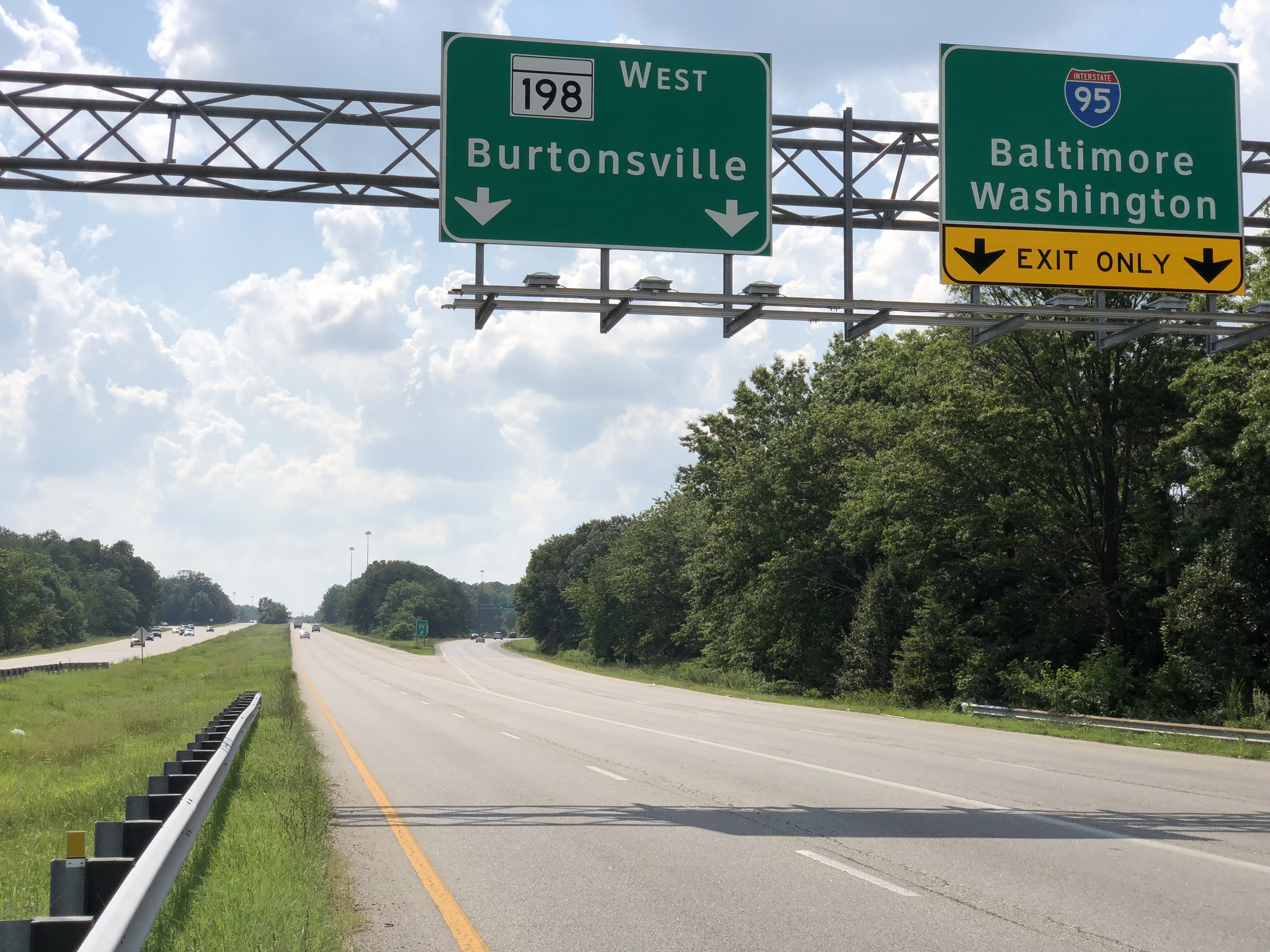
MD 198 westbound at I-95 in Laurel

The first segment of MD 198 was built as a 15-foot-wide (4.6 m) concrete road from US 1 west to Contee Road by 1921; the two roads intersected at the site of the modern I-95 interchange. The concrete road was extended west to the Montgomery–Prince George's county line in 1923. In Laurel, MD 198 originally followed Montgomery Street and the piece of Sandy Spring Road north of modern MD 198 from Montgomery Street to the I-95 interchange. A separate segment of MD 198 was built as a macadam road from MD 27 (later US 29, now MD 650) to a point east of Good Hope Road in 1929 and 1930. In addition, the first segment of the state highway was extended as a 20-foot-wide (6.1 m) macadam road from the county line to the western Old Columbia Pike intersection in Burtonsville; the macadam road continued south along Old Columbia Pike, which was then designated MD 196. MD 198 was widened with a pair of 3.5-foot-wide (1.1 m) bituminous shoulders from the county line east to Laurel between 1938 and 1940. There remained a gap in MD 198 between Spencerville and Burtonsville until the intervening county road was brought into state maintenance in 1956.

Maryland Route 602
- Location: Laurel–Fort Meade
- Existed: 1944–1956

The original route connecting Laurel and Fort Meade was MD 216. That highway was built between 1934 and 1939 along a course generally north of modern MD 198. Modern MD 198 was constructed as MD 602 as a military access project during World War II. The first segment of the new highway, from US 1 to MD 216 near Brock Bridge Road in what is now Maryland City, was started in 1943 and completed in 1944. This segment included a bridge across the Baltimore and Ohio Railroad (now CSX) in Laurel and a bridge across the Patuxent River. The remainder of MD 602, from near Brock Bridge Road to the entrance to Fort Meade near the Little Patuxent River, was completed by 1946. When MD 602 was completed, MD 216 was truncated at US 1.

MD 198 was widened to 30 feet (9.1 m) on Montgomery Street in Laurel in 1948. When the US 1 Laurel Bypass—today the northbound lanes of the U.S. Highway on Second Street—was completed, the highway was extended east one block on Montgomery Street to the new bypass in 1950 and 1951. In 1963, MD 198 was removed from Montgomery Avenue and placed on its Gorman–Talbott one-way pair through Laurel in 1963. That same year, a new piece of highway was created from Van Dusen Road to Ninth Street to connect the one-way pair with Sandy Spring Road. That same year, MD 198 was extended over the course of MD 602 to Fort Meade. The first portion of MD 198 to become a divided highway was along a new alignment from Sweitzer Lane to Van Dusen Road. This highway was built concurrent with I-95 and the I-95–MD 198 interchange in 1970 and 1971.

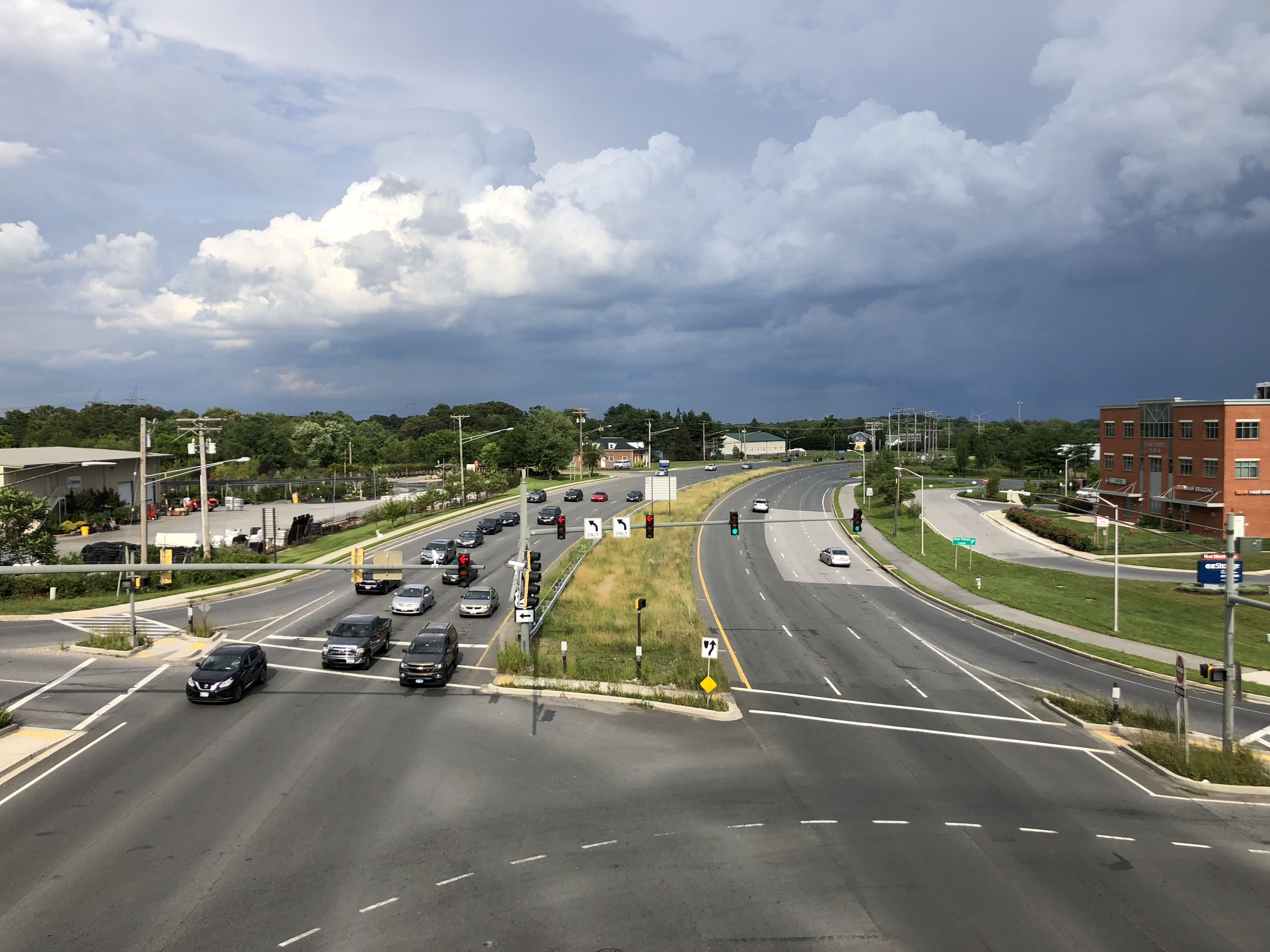
View east along MD 198 from US 29 in Burtonsville

The MD 198 divided highway was extended west from Sweitzer Lane to what was then US 29 in 1985. That same year, the state highway was expanded to a divided highway from US 1 to the Patuxent River. MD 198 was rebuilt as a divided highway from the Patuxent River to just west of the Baltimore–Washington Parkway in 1987. The divided highway was extended through the parkway interchange in 1991. As part of the construction, the original five-ramp partial cloverleaf interchange had a loop ramp added from the northbound parkway to westbound MD 198. That same year, MD 198 was extended east from the Little Patuxent River to newly constructed MD 32 in Fort Meade. The state highway's western terminus was relocated from an acute intersection with MD 650 to an orthogonal intersection in 1997. The west leg of the intersection became operational when the extended Norbeck Road, a county highway connecting the ends of MD 28 and MD 198, opened in 2004. MD 198's eastern end was extended along its current course when the MD 198–MD 32 dumbbell interchange was completed in 2002. The MD 198–US 29 interchange opened in 2005.

MDSHA has conducted a study on the east–west corridor between the MD 28–MD 97 intersection at Norbeck and the I-95–MD 198 interchange, a corridor that forms the most direct route from Laurel to Rockville. Plans for the MD 198 portion of the corridor call for expanding the route to a four-lane divided highway from MD 650 to US 29 and widening the highway to six lanes from the Montgomery–Prince George's County line to west of I-95. The proposals also include adding a center left-turn lane to MD 198 between Old Columbia Pike and the Columbia Pike intersection and constructing roundabouts at Good Hope Road, Thompson Road, and Peach Orchard Road in Spencerville. MDSHA has also conducted a study concerning MD 198 between the Baltimore–Washington Parkway and Fort Meade. Proposed improvements are associated with the Base Realignment and Closure process that has greatly increased activity at Fort Meade. The preferred alternative that came out of the study was to expand MD 198 from the Baltimore–Washington Parkway to MD 32 to a four-lane divided highway and to construct a flyover ramp from westbound MD 32 to westbound MD 198 to supplement the existing dumbbell interchange.

== Junction list ==
County	Location	mi	km	Destinations	Notes
Montgomery	Spencerville	0.00	0.00	MD 650 (New Hampshire Avenue) / Norbeck Road west to MD 28 west – Silver Spring, Sandy Spring	Western terminus
Montgomery	Burtonsville	3.45	5.55	US 29 south (Columbia Pike) / Old Columbia Pike north – Washington	Old Columbia Pike is unsigned US 29A
Montgomery	Burtonsville	3.61	5.81	US 29 north (Columbia Pike) – Columbia	Diamond interchange; no direct access from southbound US 29 to MD 198
Prince George's	Laurel	6.09	9.80	I-95 – Baltimore, Washington	I-95 Exit 33
Prince George's	Laurel	7.94	12.78	MD 216 west (Seventh Street) – North Laurel	Eastern terminus of MD 216
Prince George's	Laurel	8.35	13.44	US 1 south (Washington Boulevard) – Beltsville	
Prince George's	Laurel	8.42	13.55	US 1 north (Second Street) – Savage	
Prince George's	Laurel	8.82	14.19	MD 197 south (Laurel Bowie Road) – Bowie	Northern terminus of MD 197
Anne Arundel	Maryland City	11.13	17.91	Baltimore–Washington Parkway (MD 295) – Baltimore, Washington	Partial cloverleaf interchange
Anne Arundel	Fort Meade	13.79	22.19	MD 32 (Patuxent Freeway) – Columbia, Odenton	MD 32 Exit 8
Anne Arundel	Fort Meade	14.14	22.76	Mapes Road – Fort Meade	Eastern terminus
1.000 mi = 1.609 km; 1.000 km = 0.621 mi: Incomplete access

== Auxiliary route ==
MD 198A is the designation for Old MD 198, which runs 0.07 miles (0.11 km) from MD 650 east to a dead end adjacent to MD 198 near Spencerville. MD 198A is the old alignment of MD 198 before the highway's western terminus was relocated to its present intersection in 1997. MD 198A was assigned to the stub in 2007.
