= Maryland Route 216 =

Highway in U.S. state of Maryland

Maryland Route 216
- Maryland Route 216 highlighted in red

Route information
- Maintained by MDSHA and City of Laurel
- Length: 8.73 mi (14.05 km)
- Existed: 1927–present

Major junctions
- West end: MD 108 at Highland
- US 29 in Scaggsville; I-95 in North Laurel
- East end: MD 198 in Laurel

Location
- Country: United States
- State: Maryland
- Counties: Howard, Prince George's, Anne Arundel

Highway system
- Maryland highway system; Interstate; US; State; Scenic Byways
← MD 214	→ MD 218

Maryland Route 216 (MD 216) is a state highway in the U.S. state of Maryland. Known for most of its length as Scaggsville Road, the highway runs 8.73 miles (14.05 km) from MD 108 at Highland east to MD 198 in Laurel. MD 216 connects Highland, Fulton, Scaggsville, and North Laurel in southern Howard County with Laurel in northern Prince George's County. The highway connects those communities with Interstate 95 (I-95) and U.S. Route 29 (US 29).

MD 216 was constructed from Laurel to Fulton in the mid-1920s and extended to Highland in the late 1930s. The highway was constructed through Laurel toward Fort Meade in Anne Arundel County in the mid-1930s. MD 216 was truncated at US 1 in Laurel after MD 198 was constructed from Laurel to Fort Meade in the mid-1940s. The highway's eastern terminus was moved from US 1 to MD 198 and relocated in North Laurel in the early 1960s. Another segment of MD 216 was relocated when I-95 was built in the early 1970s, resulting in a disjoint route. The route was unified when the highway was relocated west through its interchange with US 29 in the mid-2000s.

== Route description ==
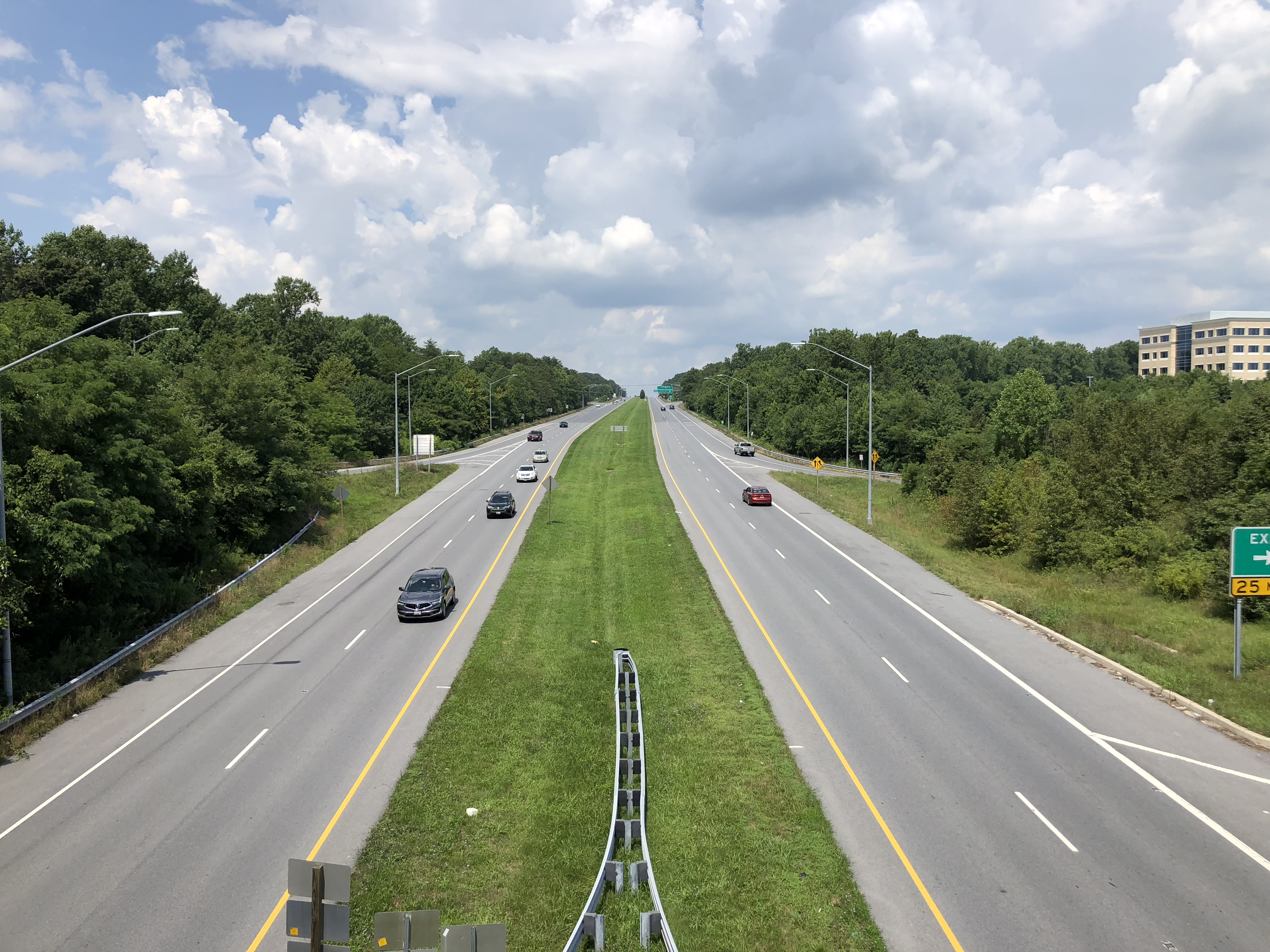
View west along MD 216 at Stephens Road in North Laurel

MD 216 begins at an intersection with MD 108 (Clarksville Pike) in Highland in Howard County. The road continues west as county-maintained Highland Road. MD 216 heads southeast as two-lane undivided Scaggsville Road, which veers east in the village of Fulton and passes south of Reservoir High School. The highway expands to a four-lane divided highway that passes through four roundabouts and heads north of a park and ride lot serving MTA Maryland commuter buses on its approach to its four-ramp partial cloverleaf interchange with US 29 (Columbia Pike) in Scaggsville. The first roundabout is with Old Columbia Pike and provides access to the park and ride lot; the second is with Maple Lawn Boulevard, which serves the Maple Lawn community to the north. The next two roundabouts are with the ramps to and from US 29 and with MD 216J and Ice Crystal Drive, respectively, on either side of the U.S. Highway. MD 216 continues southeast through intersections with Crest Road and Leishear Road and passes south of an electric substation before its cloverleaf interchange with I-95.

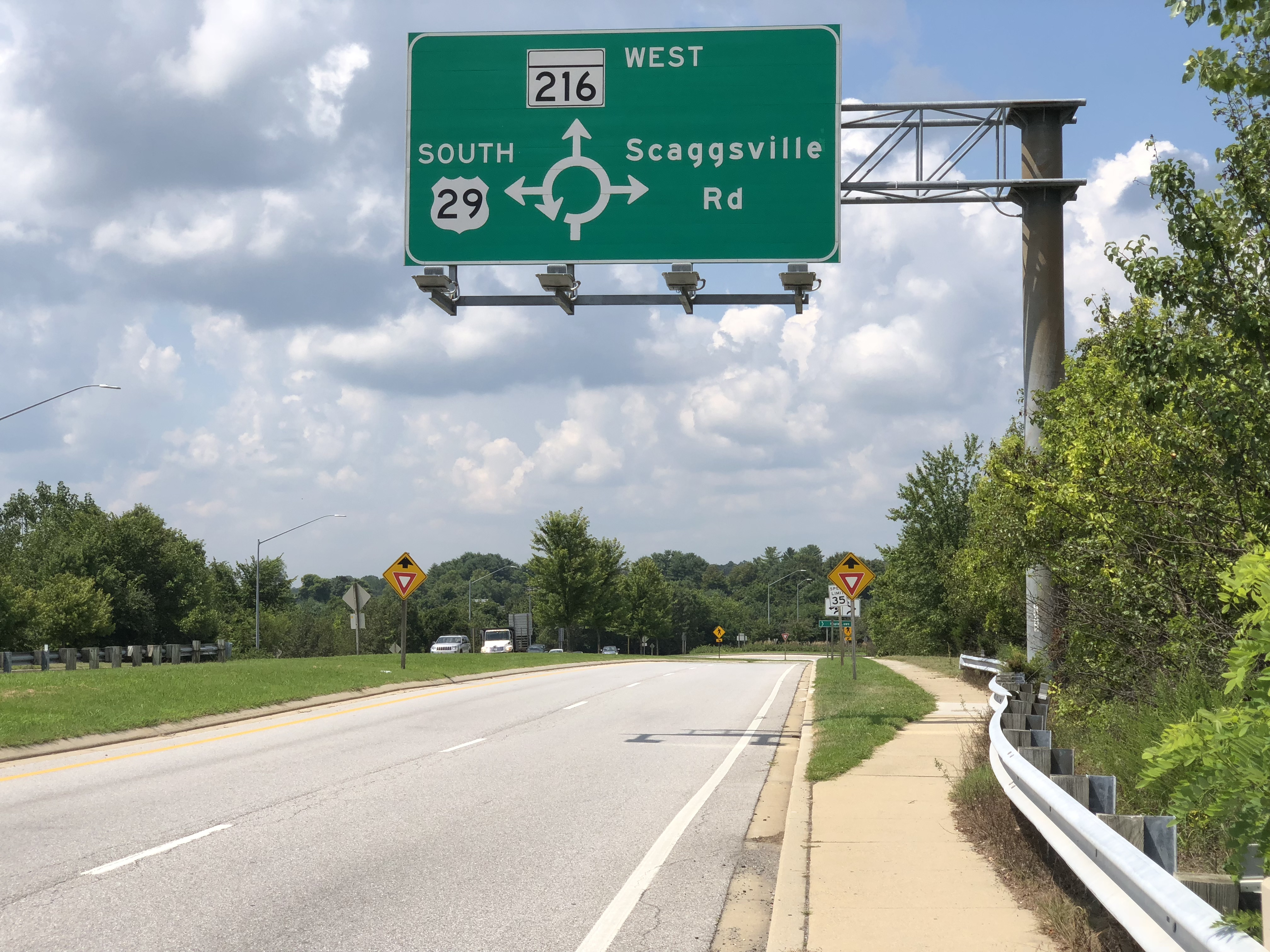
MD 216 westbound at US 29 in Scaggsville

East of I-95, MD 216 has a partial interchange with Stephens Road. There is no access from Stephens Road to eastbound MD 216; that movement is made at the next intersection with All Saints Road, where the highway reduces to a two-lane undivided road. The highway expands to a four-lane divided highway again just north of Baltimore Avenue and Pilgrim Avenue and crosses over the Patuxent River into the city of Laurel in Prince George's County, where it continues as 7th Street. At its intersection with Main Street, MD 216 drops to two lanes, becomes municipally maintained, and is virtually unsigned. The highway passes east of the original site of Laurel High School at Montgomery Street and east of the Laurel Branch Library at Talbott Avenue, which is the westbound portion of the one-way pair that carries MD 198 through the city. MD 216 continues two blocks to its eastern terminus at eastbound MD 198 (Gorman Avenue).

== History ==
The first segment of MD 216 was built as a gravel road from Main Street in Laurel to Scaggsville in 1923. The highway was extended to Fulton in 1925. Main Street in Laurel was paved in macadam with concrete shoulders between 1930 and 1933. Starting in 1934, MD 216 was extended east from US 1 to Fort Meade using the existing county bridge across the Patuxent River, which was repaired as part of the project. The extension to Fort Meade was completed by 1938. MD 216 was extended west from Fulton to US 29 (now MD 108) at Highland in 1938 and 1939. Starting in 1942, MD 602 was built along the present alignment of MD 198 from US 1 to Fort Meade as a military access project. The first segment of the new highway, from US 1 to MD 216 near Brock Bridge Road in what is now Maryland City, was completed by 1944. The remainder of MD 602 from near Brock Bridge Road to the entrance to Fort Meade near the Little Patuxent River was completed by 1946. When MD 602 was completed, MD 216 was truncated at US 1.

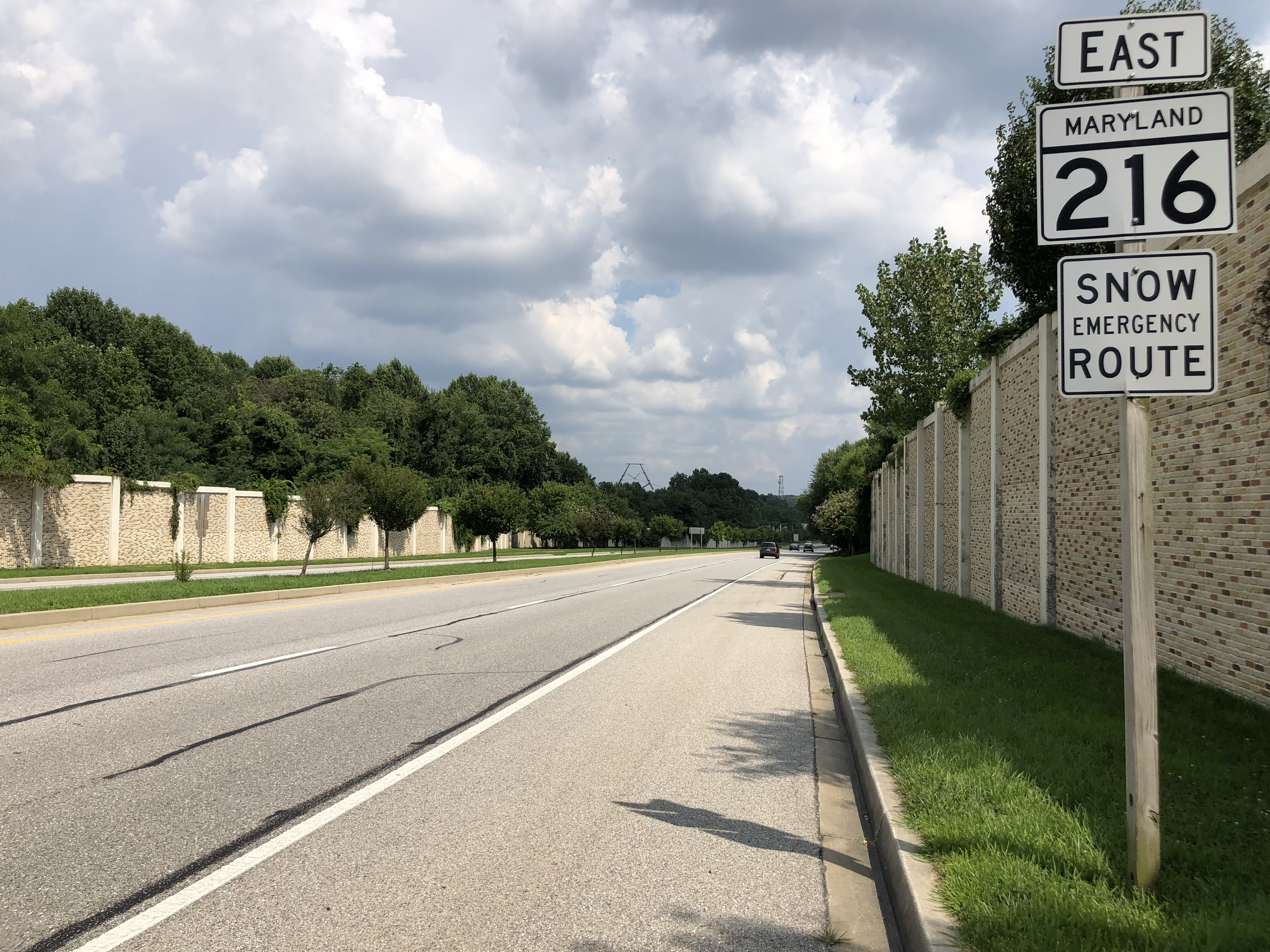
MD 216 eastbound in Scaggsville

At its maximum extent in 1942, MD 216 mostly followed its present alignment from Highland to Scaggsville. The highway continued along what is now Old Scaggsville Road, which is now broken into two parts by the I-95 interchange. MD 216 crossed the Patuxent River in line with 9th Street in Laurel on a bridge that no longer exists. The highway turned east onto Main Street, which it followed through its intersection with US 1. MD 216 passed under the Baltimore and Ohio Railroad (now CSX's Capital Subdivision) and curved east to cross the Patuxent River on another defunct bridge. The highway passed along the edge of Laurel Park Racecourse and intersected Brock Bridge Road near the latter road's modern intersection with MD 198. MD 216 continued along a path generally to the north of what is now MD 198; several pieces of the old highway remain in Maryland City and on the east side of the Baltimore–Washington Parkway. The state highway's eastern end was at the entrance to Fort Meade near the Little Patuxent River.

MD 216 was paved from Highland to Laurel in 1956. The highway's present bridge across the Patuxent River was built in 1960. The following year, MD 216 was removed from Main Street and placed on 7th Street from the river to MD 198, which then followed Montgomery Avenue. By 1963, the state highway was moved to its present course from north of the Patuxent River to Scaggsville Road near the site of the I-95 interchange. Old Scaggsville Road was later designated MD 983. Also in 1963, MD 198 was moved from Montgomery Avenue to its present one-way pair through Laurel and MD 216 was extended along 7th Street to its present terminus. The highway's interchange with I-95 was constructed in 1970 and 1971. Between then and 1978, MD 216 was extended west from the I-95 interchange along a new course to Leishear Road, bypassing another part of Scaggsville Road. That segment of Old Scaggsville Road became MD 983A. The portion of Leishear Road connecting the two segments of MD 216 remained county maintained.

Work on improving MD 216's intersection with US 29 was underway by 1997, when the state highway was expanded to a divided highway on either side of the intersection. The US 29–MD 216 interchange, including the pair of roundabouts, was completed in 2001. The three-legged roundabout at Old Columbia Pike was added in 2002; the one at Maple Lawn Boulevard was completed in 2004. The MD 216 divided highway between the US 29 interchange and east of Leishear Road was under construction by 2004 and completed in 2005. The western end of the two-lane segment of highway from the US 29 interchange to Leishear Road was changed to a cul-de-sac. MD 216's partial interchange with Stephens Road was under construction by 2003 and completed in 2005.

== Junction list ==
County	Location	mi	km	Destinations	Notes
Howard	Highland	0.00	0.00	MD 108 (Clarksville Pike) / Highland Road north – Olney, Clarksville	Western terminus
Howard	Scaggsville	4.05	6.52	US 29 (Columbia Pike) – Columbia, Washington	US 29 Exit 13
Howard	North Laurel	6.55	10.54	I-95 – Baltimore, Washington	I-95 Exit 35
Howard	North Laurel	7.24	11.65	Stephens Road north	Trumpet interchange; no access from Stephens Road to eastbound MD 216
Prince George's	Laurel	8.62	13.87	MD 198 west (Talbott Avenue) – Burtonsville	
Prince George's	Laurel	8.73	14.05	MD 198 east (Gorman Avenue) – Fort Meade	Eastern terminus
1.000 mi = 1.609 km; 1.000 km = 0.621 mi: Incomplete access

== Auxiliary routes ==
MD 216 has five existing auxiliary routes and five former auxiliary routes. MD 216A, MD 216B, and MD 216I and former MD 216C were designated between Maryland City and Fort Meade. The remaining routes are or were in Scaggsville.

- MD 216A is the designation for Old Camp Meade Road, which runs 0.13 miles (0.21 km) from Whiskey Bottom Road to a dead end on the westbound side of MD 198 in Maryland City.
- MD 216B is the designation for Old Portland Road, which runs 0.65 miles (1.05 km) from a dead end east to MD 198 on the westbound side of that state highway between Maryland City and Fort Meade. The highway provides access to the Maya Angelou Academy.
- MD 216C was the designation for the 0.13-mile (0.21 km) unnamed piece of road parallel to the eastbound side of MD 198 between Maryland City and Fort Meade. The highway was connected to MD 198 by Welchs Court. MD 216C was removed concurrently with the assignment of MD 216I for perpendicular Welchs Court in 2006.
- MD 216D is the designation for Old Scaggsville Road Spur, which runs 0.04 miles (0.064 km) from county-maintained Old Scaggsville Road Spur to the entrance of a shopping center in the northwest quadrant of the MD 216–US 29 interchange. On February 2, 2017, a 0.03-mile (0.048 km) section of Old Scaggsville Road Spur connecting to MD 216F was transferred to county maintenance.
- MD 216E was the designation for the 1.21-mile (1.95 km) portion of Old Scaggsville Road from a dead end adjacent to the MD 216–US 29 interchange to Leishear Road. East of Leishear Road, Old Scaggsville Road continued as part of MD 983A. The westernmost 0.21 miles (0.34 km) of the highway was assigned in 2001 when MD 216 was relocated through its new interchange with US 29. MD 216E was extended east to Leishear Road in 2005 when MD 216's new divided highway opened between US 29 and Leishear Road. The route was transferred to county maintenance on February 2, 2017.
- MD 216F was the designation for Old Scaggsville Road, a 0.17-mile (0.27 km) section of old alignment of MD 216 from a dead end east to MD 216D in the northwest quadrant of the MD 216–US 29 interchange. MD 216F was connected to MD 216 via MD 216J. The highway was assigned in 2001 when MD 216 was relocated through its new interchange with US 29. The route was transferred to county maintenance on February 2, 2017.
- MD 216G was the designation for the 0.08-mile (0.13 km) segment of Ice Crystal Drive immediately to the south of its junction with MD 216 at the roundabout on the east side of the MD 216–US 29 interchange. The highway was assigned in 2001 when MD 216 was relocated through its new interchange with US 29. The route was transferred to county maintenance on February 2, 2017.
- MD 216H was the designation for the 0.63-mile (1.01 km) section of Old Columbia Road south of its roundabout junction with MD 216. The highway was designated in 2002. The route was transferred to county maintenance on February 2, 2017.
- MD 216I is the designation for Welchs Court, which runs 0.04 miles (0.064 km) between a county-maintained road named Old MD 216C to MD 198 on the eastbound side of the latter state highway between Maryland City and Fort Meade. MD 216I was assigned concurrent with the removal of MD 216C from the perpendicular road in 2006.
- MD 216J is the designation for the unnamed 0.03-mile (0.048 km) connector between MD 216F and the roundabout on the west side of the MD 216–US 29 interchange. The connector was built in 2001 but was not designated MD 216J until 2007.
