= Spencerville, Maryland =

- Census-designated place
- Location within Maryland Location within the United States
- Coordinates: 39°07′26″N 76°58′50″W
- Country: United States
- State: Maryland
- County: Montgomery

Area
  - Total: 1.56 sq mi (4.05 km^{2})
  - Land: 1.56 sq mi (4.04 km^{2})
  - Water: 0.0039 sq mi (0.01 km^{2})
- Elevation: 535 ft (163 m)

Population (2020)
  - Total: 1,812
  - Density: 1,160.3/sq mi (447.99/km^{2})
- Time zone: UTC−5 (Eastern (EST))
  - Summer (DST): UTC−4 (EDT)
- ZIP code: 20868
- Area codes: 240 & 301
- GNIS feature ID: 2583689
- FIPS code: 24-74050

Spencerville is an unincorporated community and census-designated place in Montgomery County, Maryland, United States. Spencerville is 1 mile (1.6 km) north of Cloverly. Spencerville has a post office with ZIP code 20868. As of the 2020 census, the population was 1,812.

== Demographics ==
Historical population
Census	Pop.	Note	%±
2010	1,594		—
2020	1,812		13.7%
U.S. Decennial Census; 2010

Spencerville first appeared as a census designated place in the 2010 U.S. census formed from part of Cloverly CDP and additional area.

=== 2020 census ===
As of the 2020 census, Spencerville had a population of 1,812. The median age was 42.5 years. 22.2% of residents were under the age of 18 and 17.4% of residents were 65 years of age or older. For every 100 females there were 104.5 males, and for every 100 females age 18 and over there were 99.2 males age 18 and over.

95.3% of residents lived in urban areas, while 4.7% lived in rural areas.

There were 571 households in Spencerville, of which 40.1% had children under the age of 18 living in them. Of all households, 69.4% were married-couple households, 10.5% were households with a male householder and no spouse or partner present, and 17.2% were households with a female householder and no spouse or partner present. About 11.4% of all households were made up of individuals and 5.8% had someone living alone who was 65 years of age or older.

There were 580 housing units, of which 1.6% were vacant. The homeowner vacancy rate was 0.2% and the rental vacancy rate was 0.0%.

Racial composition as of the 2020 census
Race	Number	Percent
White	776	42.8%
Black or African American	334	18.4%
American Indian and Alaska Native	13	0.7%
Asian	282	15.6%
Native Hawaiian and Other Pacific Islander	3	0.2%
Some other race	201	11.1%
Two or more races	203	11.2%
Hispanic or Latino (of any race)	342	18.9%
