= Maryland City, Maryland =

- Census-designated place
- Location within Anne Arundel County

- Location in Maryland
- Coordinates: 39°5′33″N 76°49′10″W
- Country: United States
- State: Maryland
- County: Anne Arundel

Area
  - Total: 7.71 sq mi (19.98 km^{2})
  - Land: 7.71 sq mi (19.98 km^{2})
  - Water: 0 sq mi (0.00 km^{2})
- Elevation: 207 ft (63 m)

Population (2020)
  - Total: 19,153
  - Density: 2,483.1/sq mi (958.72/km^{2})
- Time zone: UTC−05:00 (Eastern)
  - Summer (DST): UTC−04:00 (Eastern)
- ZIP Code: 20724
- Area codes: 301 and 240
- FIPS code: 24-51075
- GNIS feature ID: 0590752

Maryland City is a census-designated place (CDP) in Anne Arundel County, Maryland, United States. The population was 19,153 at the 2020 census. It is located east of Laurel, just over the border with Prince George's County. When the ZIP Code was created in 1963, United States Postal Service designated a large swath of land in western Anne Arundel County with 20724 "Laurel" despite none of 20724 being located in the City of Laurel, which is entirely in Prince George's County. Maryland City mostly consists of an older, compact housing development and is adjacent to Fort Meade army base. A large newer development (built mid-1990s) on the north side of Maryland Route 198 is known as Russett and is included within the Maryland City CDP.

== Services ==
Maryland City is home to the Maryland City Volunteer Fire Department, which is part of the Anne Arundel County Fire Department. MCVFD Station 27 is located at 3498 Laurel Fort Meade Road. It is staffed 24 hours a day by four career firefighters, one of whom is an EMT-paramedic. The career staff is supplemented by volunteers.

== History ==
Maryland City was developed by the Maryland City Corp, owned by developer Harvey Kayne. The 1,200 acres (490 ha) was advertised as "eastern Laurel, Maryland" being east of the City of Laurel, were purchased in 1960 for $3 million from a developer planning "Meade City". The concept was to build low-cost houses with ground-rent rather than ownership.

== Geography ==
Maryland City is located at 39°05′38″N 76°49′05″W (39.092561, −76.819419) in the westernmost corner of Anne Arundel County. It is bordered by Laurel in Prince George's County to the west, by the CDP of Scaggsville in Howard County to the north, by the CDP of Jessup to the northeast, and by Fort Meade to the east. Uninhabited portions of Fort Meade are to the south.

The Baltimore–Washington Parkway (Maryland Route 295) runs through the CDP, leading southwest 19 miles (31 km) to downtown Washington and 18 miles (29 km) northeast to downtown Baltimore. Access from the parkway to Maryland City is via Maryland Route 198 (Fort Meade Road). Maryland Route 32 (the Patuxent Freeway) forms the northeast edge of the CDP.

According to the United States Census Bureau, the CDP has a total area of 7.7 square miles (20.0 km^{2}), all land.

== Demographics ==
Historical population
Census	Pop.	Note	%±
2010	16,093		—
2020	19,153		19.0%
U.S. Decennial Census

=== Racial and ethnic composition ===
Maryland City CDP, Maryland – Racial and ethnic composition Note: the US Census treats Hispanic/Latino as an ethnic category. This table excludes Latinos from the racial categories and assigns them to a separate category. Hispanics/Latinos may be of any race.
Race / Ethnicity (NH = Non-Hispanic)	Pop 2000	Pop 2010	Pop 2020	% 2000	% 2010	% 2020
White alone (NH)	4,150	5,436	3,758	60.90%	33.78%	19.62%
Black or African American alone (NH)	1,775	6,626	9,085	26.05%	41.17%	47.43%
Native American or Alaska Native alone (NH)	30	35	31	0.44%	0.22%	0.16%
Asian alone (NH)	356	1,321	1,237	5.22%	8.21%	6.46%
Native Hawaiian or Pacific Islander alone (NH)	2	8	5	0.03%	0.05%	0.03%
Other race alone (NH)	18	35	204	0.26%	0.22%	1.07%
Mixed race or Multiracial (NH)	146	481	815	2.14%	2.99%	4.26%
Hispanic or Latino (any race)	337	2,151	4,018	4.95%	13.37%	20.98%
Total	6,814	16,093	19,153	100.00%	100.00%	100.00%

=== 2020 census ===
As of the 2020 census, Maryland City had a population of 19,153. The median age was 35.2 years. 25.0% of residents were under the age of 18 and 8.8% of residents were 65 years of age or older. For every 100 females there were 88.2 males, and for every 100 females age 18 and over there were 85.6 males age 18 and over.

99.2% of residents lived in urban areas, while 0.8% lived in rural areas.

There were 7,156 households in Maryland City, of which 35.7% had children under the age of 18 living in them. Of all households, 39.3% were married-couple households, 19.6% were households with a male householder and no spouse or partner present, and 34.3% were households with a female householder and no spouse or partner present. About 28.8% of all households were made up of individuals and 5.5% had someone living alone who was 65 years of age or older.

There were 7,452 housing units, of which 4.0% were vacant. The homeowner vacancy rate was 1.1% and the rental vacancy rate was 5.3%.

Racial composition as of the 2020 census
Race	Number	Percent
White	4,178	21.8%
Black or African American	9,214	48.1%
American Indian and Alaska Native	110	0.6%
Asian	1,248	6.5%
Native Hawaiian and Other Pacific Islander	5	0.0%
Some other race	2,585	13.5%
Two or more races	1,813	9.5%
Hispanic or Latino (of any race)	4,018	21.0%

=== 2000 census ===
As of the 2000 census, there were 6,814 people, 2,575 households, and 1,732 families residing in the CDP. The population density was 2,603.3 people per square mile (1,004.2/km^{2}). There were 2,666 housing units at an average density of 1,018.5/sq mi (392.9/km^{2}). The racial makeup of the CDP was 62.93% White, 26.58% African American, 0.50% Native American, 5.27% Asian, 0.03% Pacific Islander, 1.94% from other races, and 2.76% from two or more races. Hispanic or Latino of any race were 4.95% of the population.

There were 2,575 households, out of which 33.3% had children under the age of 18 living with them, 47.5% were married couples living together, 13.8% had a female householder with no husband present, and 32.7% were non-families. 24.6% of all households were made up of individuals, and 3.9% had someone living alone who was 65 years of age or older. The average household size was 2.62 and the average family size was 3.13.

In the CDP, the population was spread out, with 26.5% under the age of 18, 8.8% from 18 to 24, 37.3% from 25 to 44, 19.8% from 45 to 64, and 7.6% who were 65 years of age or older. The median age was 33 years. For every 100 females, there were 95.6 males. For every 100 females age 18 and over, there were 94.0 males.

The median income for a household in the CDP was $51,849, and the median income for a family was $55,754. Males had a median income of $38,879 versus $33,424 for females. The per capita income for the CDP was $23,259. About 2.1% of families and 3.6% of the population were below the poverty line, including 1.4% of those under age 18 and 4.3% of those age 65 or over.

== Transportation ==
Laurel station and Laurel Racetrack station are close to Maryland City, providing access to the Camden Line of the MARC Train.
