= Paul Griffith Stromberg =

American newspaper publisher (1892–1952)

Paul Griffith ("Pete") Stromberg
- Born: March 21, 1892; Ellicott City, Maryland, United States
- Died: November 4, 1952; Ellicott City, Maryland
- Occupations: Publisher, State Senator
- Political party: Democratic Party
- Spouse: La Rue Viola Radcliff
- Children: Paul Griffith, Jr., Dorris Virginia
- Parent(s): Anthony Stromberg, Mary Ellen Flanagan

Paul Griffith ("Pete") Stromberg (March 21, 1892 – November 4, 1952) was the owner since 1940 and editor since 1920 of The Howard County Times, founded 1840 in Ellicott City, Maryland, the county seat of Howard County, which later grew into a syndicate of local community newspapers known as the "Stromberg Newspapers" in Howard County, Anne Arundel County, Prince George's County, Baltimore County and Baltimore City. He also was a Maryland State Senator from Howard County in the General Assembly of Maryland.

== Biography ==
Stromberg was born at "Howard's Range", (also known as "Worthington's Range" and "Howard's Chance"), an 18th-century house, constructed c. 1753, located between Maryland Route 108 and Old Guilford Road (formerly Maryland Route 32), which later burned in 1977. Stromberg commanded the State Guard weekly newsletter at the barracks at President Franklin D. Roosevelt's "New Deal" social program, the Works Progress Administration (W.P.A.) building on the grounds of the former Ellicott City High School (now the Howard High School, with the former building as the "Greystone" housing development). During World War II, he commanded Company F, Seventh Battalion. Stromberg's son served in World War II in the United States Army Air Corps in the China-Burma-India Theater (C-B-I) of Southeast Asia where he died in Assam, India.

Stromberg served and represented Howard County as a state senator in the upper house of the General Assembly of Maryland from 1947 to 1950.

Stromberg became an editor of The Baltimore Sun, the major daily newspaper in Baltimore, which would coincidentally absorb The Howard County Times and its last independent owner, the Patuxent Publishing Company of Columbia, Maryland along with the later community suburban newspapers in a later merger and take-over of Stromberg's Patuxent Publishing successors, in the early 2010s. With Judge James A. Clark, Sr., Paul Talbot and himself as editor in 1920, they took over control of The Howard County Times, which had been founded in 1840 and had a long distinguished record of publication. Beginning in 1940, Stromberg took control of the Maryland Printing and Publishing Company which gave him sole ownership of The Howard County Times newspaper. Stromberg in turn created or purchased eleven new local papers in central Maryland and the surrounding suburbs of Baltimore County during the 1950s and 60s and employed his stepson Charles L. Gerwig as editor. In January 1940, his newspaper business nearly was halted by an Ellicott City fire in the building hosting Melville Scott and Sons insurance and the post office which netted $3,000 in insurance settlements. The same year, Stromberg was appointed as the head of a five county commission to propose a military "Super Highway" between Baltimore and Washington. In 1944, he became the President of the Maryland-Delaware-District of Columbia Press Association (MDDC Press Association). Stromberg's editorial influence helped his brother-in-law Norman E. Moxley become a County Commissioner and member of the Howard County Board of County Commissioners in 1949, Edgar Russell Moxley to become Police Chief, and Robert Moxley a prominent land developer purchasing land for the Rouse Company and nationally famous mall developer James Rouse, (1914–1996), who began laying out and development of the new town of Columbia, Maryland in the central part of the County, midway between Baltimore and Washington, D.C. in 1967.

In 1962, Paul G. Stromberg's daughter, Doris (Stromberg) Thompson, ran on a slate with James A. Clark, Jr., as the first woman candidate for Howard County Commissioner. She won the Democratic Party primary, but lost the general election. Doris would later become the editor of her father's newspaper, 14 years after his death, from 1966 to 1978.

== See also ==
- The Howard County Times
- The Baltimore Sun
- Griffith's Adventure
