= Clark's Elioak Farm =

Historic farm in Maryland, United States

Coordinates: 39.235798°N 76.876182°W

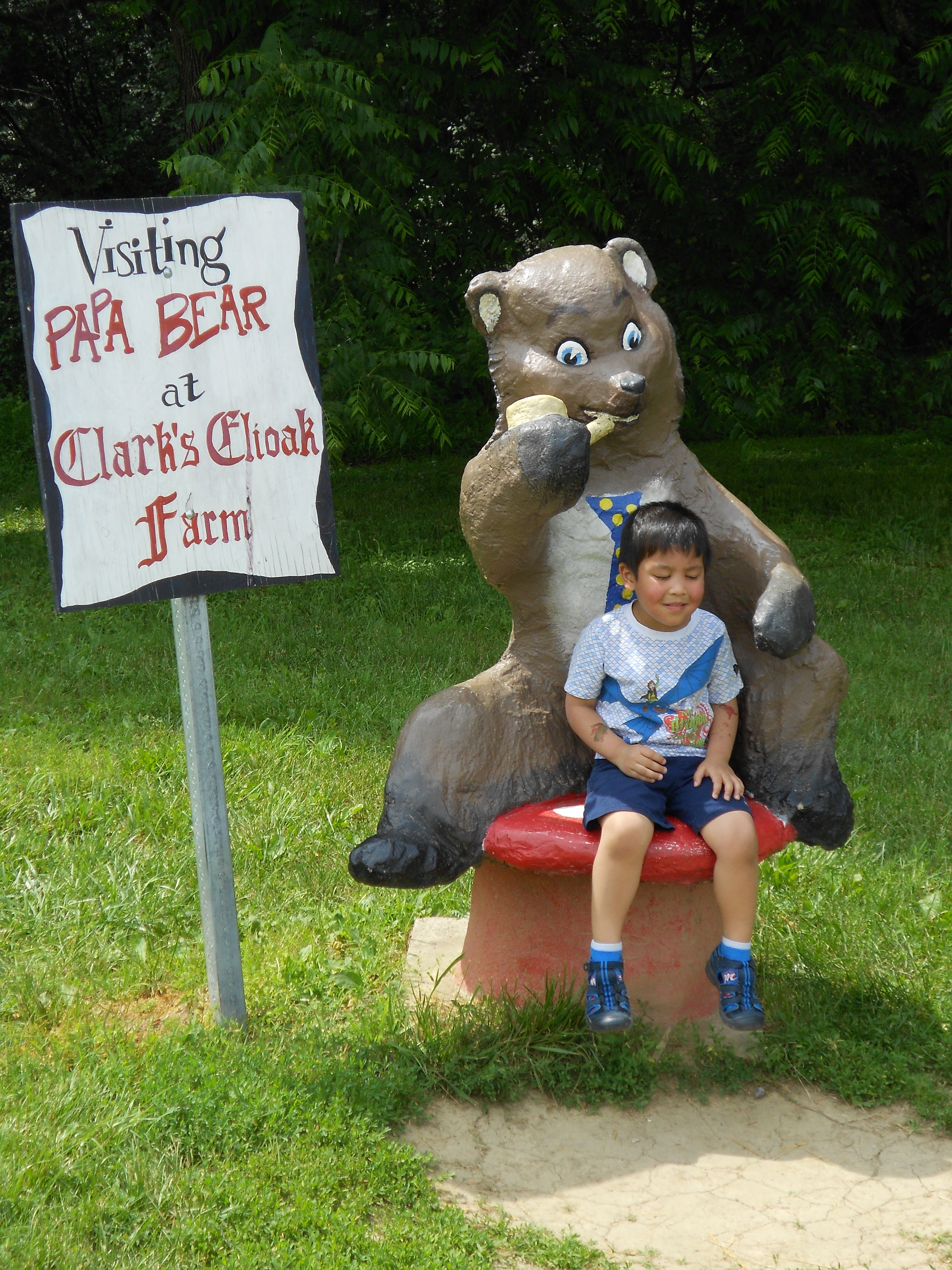
Boy sitting with Papa Bear at Clark's Elioak Farm

Clark's Elioak Farm is a historic farm and petting zoo located along Maryland Route 108 in Howard County, Maryland, covering 540 acres. All of the acreage is part of county or state farmland protection programs, barring use of the property for non-farm development. The Clarks, a family with a tradition of farming in Maryland spanning seven generations, have owned the Elioak farm since 1927.

The name, Elioak, refers to a type of silty clay loam common to the slopes and summits of hills in the northern portion of the Piedmont Plateau. Elioak soil is deep, well-drained, and moderately permeable, making it suitable for apple orchards. Elioak was also listed as a former turn of the century Howard County postal village.

In recent years, the Elioak Farm has become a petting zoo and the venue for restoration of the former Enchanted Forest.

== Farming tradition ==
The Clark family's farming tradition in Maryland began with the lease by James, John and David Clark of two lots from Charles Carroll on November 1, 1797. In 1850, the family began purchasing its own acreage in the western portion of Howard County, starting with Wheatfield Farm. James Clark Sr. was born at Fairfield Farm, where he married Alda Clark from White Hall, moving to Keewaydin Farm on Columbia Road. They purchased Elioak Farm in 1927. The 312 acre farm was half-wooded, the main house burned down in 1900 leaving a two story tenant house and a stone slave quarters. James Clark Sr. raised Angus cattle, with yearly cattle drives down Route 29 to Wheatfield Farm.

James Clark, Jr., who later became president of the Maryland State Senate, returned to Elioak Farm to resume the family tradition of farming after serving in World War II. He was given a half share of his father's farm in 1946 and eventually fully owned and operated Elioak, until his death in 2006 at the age of 87. Clark moved into the 18th century stone slave quarters with his new bride in 1946, initially adding a kitchen and bathroom, then two more bedrooms and hot water in 1950. In 1951, he established the Clarkland Farms dairy and beef operations at Elioak and expanded operations to the adjacent 160 acre Dallas Brown Farm. His concern about the rapid development of land in Howard County in the 1960s influenced both his political and farming careers. He developed Program Open Space, preserving undeveloped land in Maryland, and served as a member of the Maryland Environmental Trust and Land Trust Alliance.

Jimmy Carter visited the farm twice in 1975 when Clark arranged for Maryland Democratic supporters to meet there during Carter's presidential campaign. As president, Carter visited again while campaigning in 1980.

His family farm motto, "Never Sell the Land", is inscribed in a memorial stone at the farm.

== Farm ==
=== Petting zoo ===
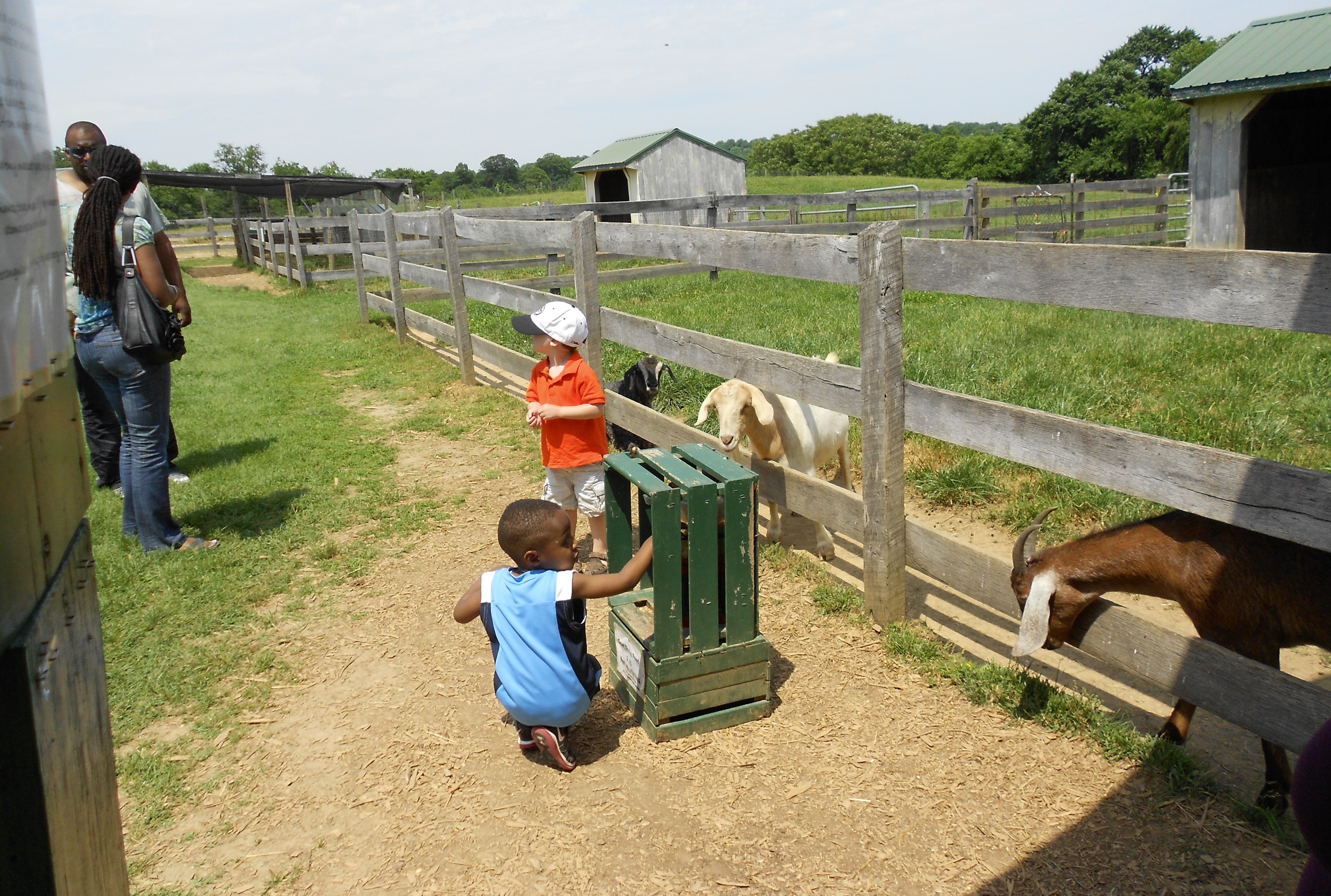
Children feeding goats at petting zoo.

When Martha opened a petting zoo at Elioak Farm in 2002, the farm began a transformation into something much more than just another family farm with a vegetable stand. The first year of the farm's petting zoo was a difficult starting point, because it was also the year of the Beltway sniper attacks in Maryland. During this period, every school tour planned for the farm was cancelled.

After the Beltway sniper's capture, the average number of visitors attracted to the farm grew to 80,000 per year.

=== Enchanted Forest restoration ===
After the Enchanted Forest, a theme park located on U.S. Route 40 in Howard County, closed in 1995, most of its exhibits sat behind a chain-link fence, slowly deteriorating as the rest of the property became the Enchanted Forest Shopping Center. The Friends of the Enchanted Forest, a nonprofit organization, raised pledges totaling $380,000 (~$653,666 in 2023) in 1999, but efforts to reopen the park at its former location were unsuccessful.

Clark's Elioak Farm became the leader of efforts to save and restore the Enchanted Forest with the purchase of Cinderella's pumpkin coach in August 2004. Kimco Realty Corp., owner of the park's former location, had donated the pumpkin coach to a charity auction. The Clarks purchased the exhibit after it was offered for sale on eBay.

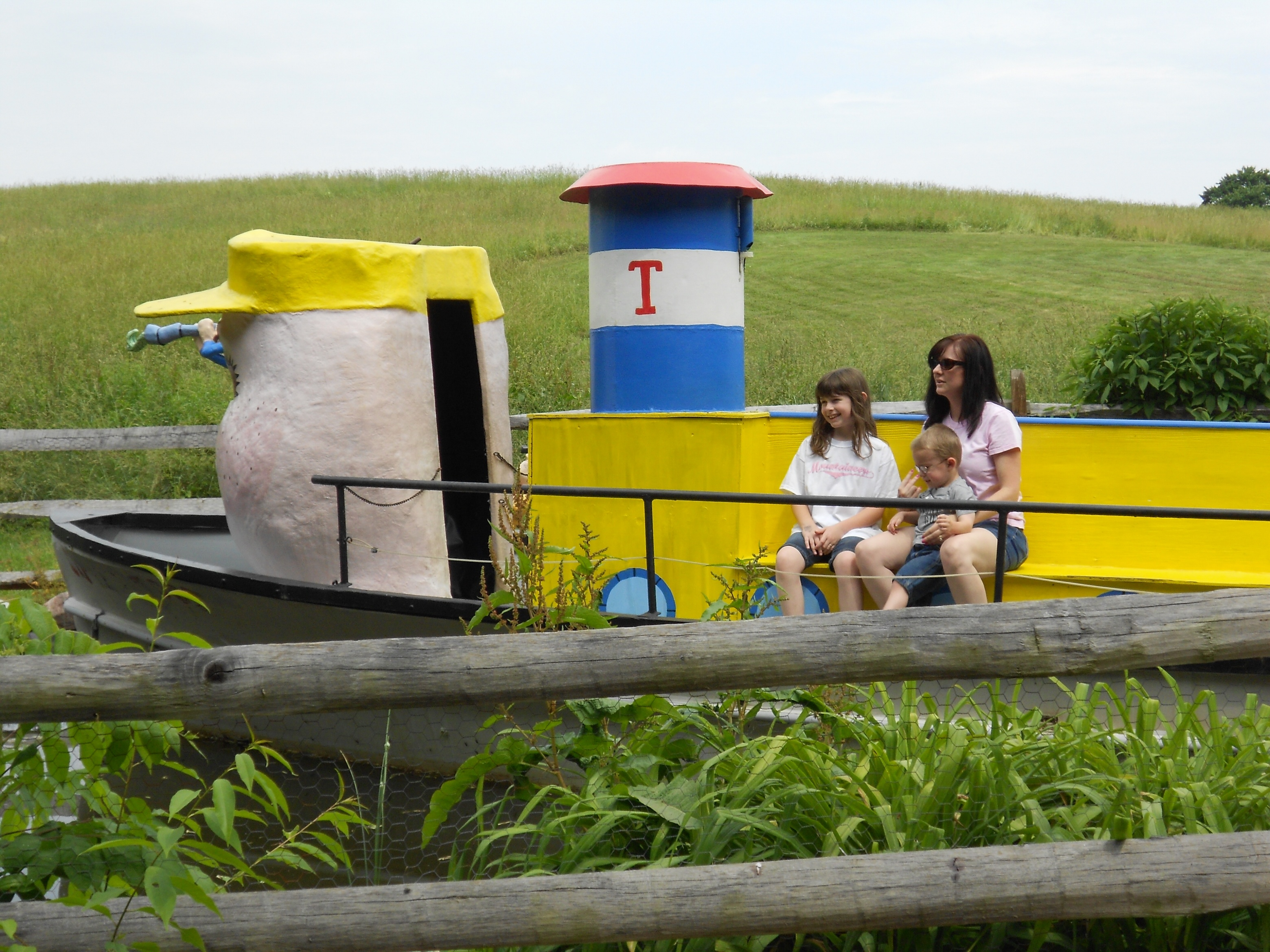
Visitors aboard Little Toot at Clark's Elioak Farm

Most of the Enchanted Forest structures and figures remaining on the shopping center property in 2004 were donated by the realty company to the restoration project at Clark's Elioak Farm. Only Old King Cole remains at the shopping center. The last items to be moved were the Entrance Castle and the Enchanted Forest storybook sign which were moved to the farm during the summer of 2015. Martha Clark along with many helpers moved over 100 items from the Enchanted Forest between 2004 and 2015.

Several of the Enchanted Forest exhibits were fully or partially restored by August 13, 2005, allowing the public to see the results at the farm's celebration of the Enchanted Forest's 50th anniversary.

Moving and restoring the Enchanted Forest pieces has been a slow and painstaking operation, involving artists, construction professionals and more than 100 volunteers over the years since the project began. Just moving some of the heavier pieces to the farm required help from the riggers of Expert House Movers, using a crane supplied without charge by Marty Levine of Ex-cel Tree Experts. The Old Woman's Shoe and the Three Bears' House, structures made of concrete, were cut in half and loaded on separate trailers for the move.

George W. Miller Jr., a Catonsville contractor, directed the installation of large structures, such as a concrete tree. Figures that had deteriorated beyond hope of repair, such as the pumpkin shell, were replaced by fiberglass artist Mark Cline. A new Enchanted Castle, also draped with a dragon like King Cole's original castle, was built in 2007 at the entrance to the new Enchanted Forest, now located at the farm.

All of the Enchanted Forest pieces donated by Kimco Realty have been moved to Clark's Elioak Farm. By 2009, many had been restored, rebuilt, or were in the process of restoration.

=== Pine tree maze ===
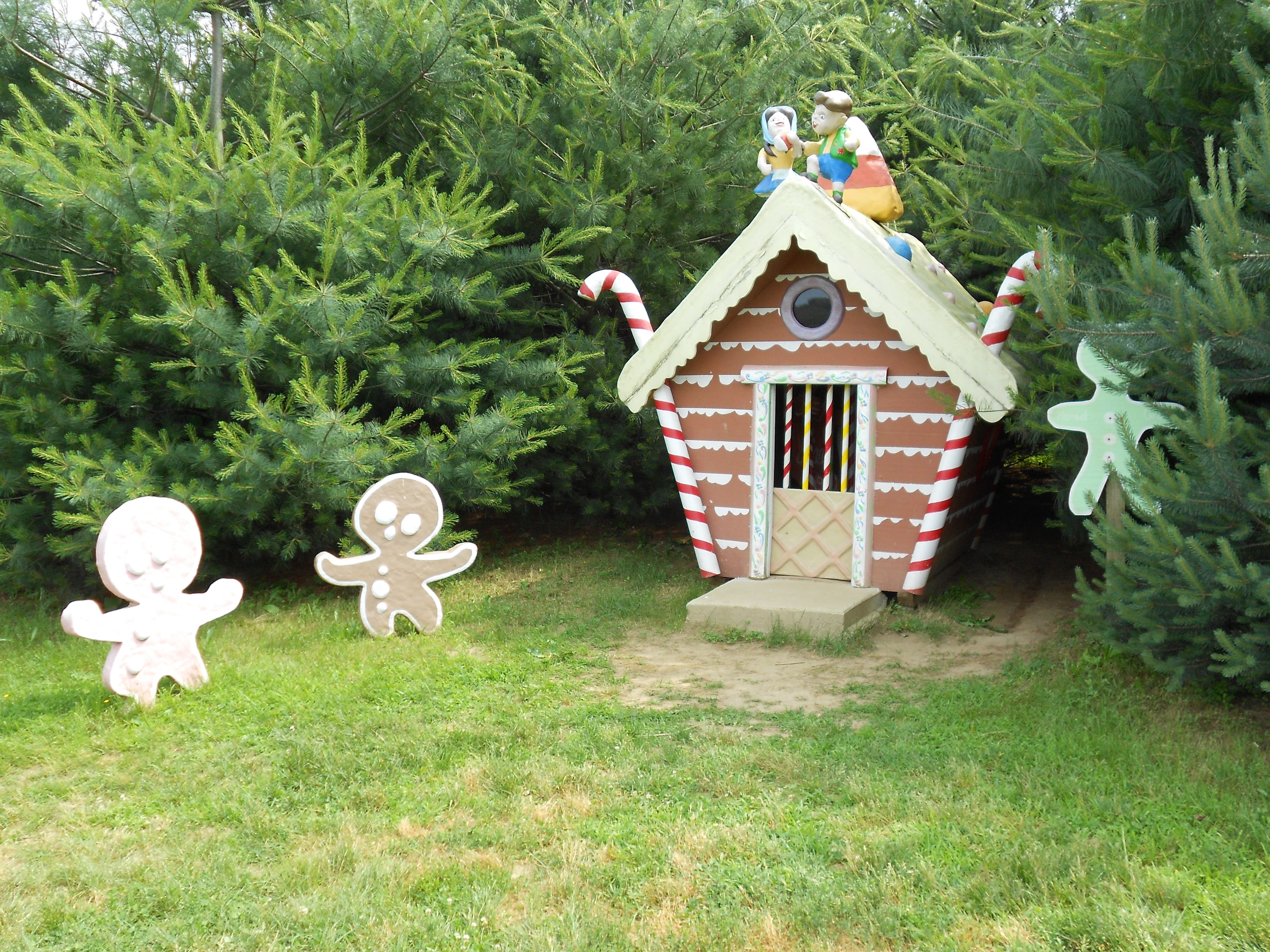
Gingerbread house in the pine tree maze

Several of the more recently restored Enchanted Forest figures were placed in a series of 14 exhibit stations along a serpentine path through a 1-1/4 acre pine tree forest. The Enchanted Forest Pine Tree Maze, a new concept originating with Martha Clark, was not a feature of the original park. This part of the farm, completed in 2009, was intended to be a "cut your own" Christmas tree operation. Many of the trees are now too large for Christmas trees, but grow closely enough together to form maze-like walls along the path.

The Enchanted Forest Maze, a children's activity book published by the Clarks, contains questions that can be answered while exploring the maze.

== Trusty the Tractor ==
Trusty the Tractor, a children's book written by Martha Clark and illustrated by Tara J. Hannon, was published by the Clarks on October 1, 2010. The 19-page, soft cover picture book is about the farm's tractor, Trusty. In an interview with Sun reporter Janene Holzberg, Martha explained that the inspiration to write the book came to her while riding the tractor, baling hay at the farm. She donated a copy of her book to each of Howard County Public Library's six branches shortly after introducing it at her farm's store.

== Operations ==
Martha Clark, daughter of the former State senator, and Martha's daughter, Nora Crist, have continued the family tradition as operators of the Elioak Farm. Their produce stand on Maryland Route 108, where the Clarks sell fresh vegetables, is not particularly unusual for a family farm. It distinguishes itself somewhat by offering "pasture-raised, grass-finished beef", raised in a low-stress, humane, natural environment.

Senator Clark's youngest son, Jamie Clark, founded the internet service provider ClarkNet on the farm in 1993, it was one of the first commercial ISPs in Maryland. It was built inside a portion of a working cow barn with fiber optic cable, banks of computer and modems, generators. The barn burned down in November 2004, ClarkNet was no longer operating by that time.

Clark's vegetable stand, at 10500 State Route 108, opens annually on July 1 and operates seven days a week from 10 a.m. to 6 p.m. It sells sweet corn, tomatoes, peppers, cucumbers, squash, watermelon and cantaloupe that are actually grown on Clark's Elioak Farm.

From April through September, the petting zoo and Enchanted Forest portion of the farm are open from Tuesday through Sunday, 10 a.m. to 5 p.m., with the last admission sold at 4 p.m. Admission prices include both areas. Its Fall schedule runs seven days a week, from the end of September to the first weekend in November, at the same hours. In addition to the petting zoo and Enchanted Forest exhibits, activities for visitors include hay rides, pony rides, playground and play areas, picnic area, birthday parties, and educational tours. The farm's "Country Store", at the entrance, sells Enchanted Forest memorabilia.

== See also ==
- Elioak, Maryland, a postal community formed around a plantation
