= Elkridge Farm =

- Location within Maryland
- 39°15′02″N 76°50′33″W
- Nearest city: Ellicott City, Maryland

History
- Built: 1913

Elkridge Farm, is a historic slave plantation located in Ellicott City in Howard County, Maryland, United States.

In 1913, James Booker Clark built a mansion resembling the White House to house seven children. James Booker was the son of James Clark, Jr., a Confederate soldier who went into the livestock and banking trade after the war. Senator James A. Clark, Jr. was a nephew who traveled to the property regularly from Keewaydin Farm, down the unimproved Montgomery Road. The plantation house was destroyed by fire on 2 July 1920, with a cracked water reservoir, at a time when James Booker Clark was facing litigation against his family, Garnett Y Clark, for a failed coal mine project. A Target store in Long Gate shopping center now occupies the site.

== See also ==
- Hilton, Maryland
- Wheatfield (Ellicott City, Maryland)
- Keewaydin Farm
