= The Howard County Times =

Newspaper in Ellicott City, Maryland

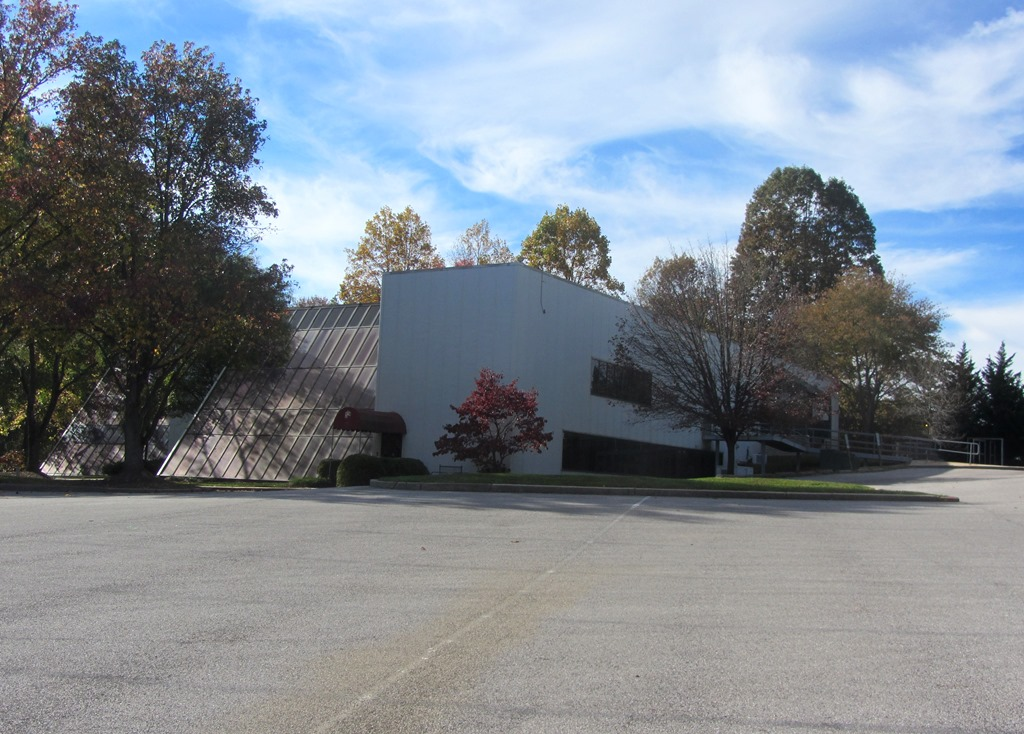
- Patuxent Publishing Company’s former headquarters in Columbia, 1978-2011
- Type: Daily newspaper
- Format: Broadsheet
- Owner: Sinclair Broadcast Group
- Publisher: Trif Alatzas
- Founded: 1869
- Headquarters: Ellicott City, Maryland & Columbia, Maryland
- Website: howardcountytimes.com

The Howard County Times is a weekly newspaper serving Howard County, Maryland, USA.

Although it claims to trace its earliest origins to 1840, it was refounded as a weekly newspaper in 1869 as The Ellicott City Times, after the purchase of the brief post-American Civil War periodical Ellicott City Record a weekly newspaper then. After nine decades of bearing the name of its main town and county seat, in 1958, its name was changed to The Howard County Times to reflect its wider coverage of county issues, affairs, and events. It went through other significant changes of ownership in 1882 and 1920. It was finally acquired in 1978 by the then-independent local publisher Patuxent Publishing Company with offices in the nearby city of Columbia, a futuristic planned town by nationally renowned developer James Rouse, along with several other local community weekly papers in Howard County and neighboring Baltimore County (using the Times nameplate) to the northeast in several suburban areas and surrounding Baltimore City in a horseshoe arc.

The Howard County Times is now owned by the Baltimore Sun Media Group, which is a subsidiary of the region's major daily newspaper The Sun, which in turn is now owned since earlier this year by Smith and his Sinclair syndicate. The Howard County paper maintains its online news page on The Baltimore Sun website.

== History ==
The Howard County Times traces its history to 1840, when the Howard Free Press was established by Edward Waite and Matthew Fields in what was known then as Ellicott Mills, (later renamed Ellicott City). The newspaper was published until 1842. Between 1840 and the American Civil War (1861-1865), a succession of newspapers opened and closed in Ellicott Mills, serving the designated in 1838 as the Howard or Western District of Anne Arundel County until the separation and erection of Howard as a separate county in 1851 in the State of Maryland as authorized by the General Assembly of Maryland sitting in the state capital of Annapolis. During these years of the early 1850s also saw debates and work for the ratification of the Maryland Constitution of 1851 (to succeed the original document from the American Revolution period in 1776) which influenced the status of the new county separated and laid out in the center of the state between Baltimore and Washington, D.C. and then afterwards the future course of the new 22nd jurisdiction in the state of the new Howard County. After the Patapsco Enterprise closed in the fall of 1861, no other newspaper was published in Howard County during the remainder of the war until 1865 when the Howard County Record was founded by publisher Isaiah Wolfersberger.

In 1869, John R. Brown, Jr., a Howard County native who had served in the Confederate States Army during the Civil War, purchased the Howard County Record and changed its name to The Ellicott City Times. Under Brown, the newspaper was successful and thrived. After Brown's death in 1877, the paper had a number of short owners. Five years later, in 1882, Edwin Warfield, (1848–1920), became owner and publisher of the Howard County and Ellicott City news sheet. Besides his local interests close to home he later became the 45th Governor of Maryland, serving from 1904-1908, at the turn of the 19th to 20th centuries and was also future banker, establishing the Fidelity and Deposit Company of Maryland, a banking and trust firm established in 1890 in Downtown Baltimore (with a landmark office at the northwest corner of the North Charles and West Lexington Streets) built in 1894 (reconstructed and expanded after damaged by Great Baltimore Fire of 1904) and also founder and publisher of The Daily Record, a daily business and legal newspaper in Baltimore. After Warfield's death, publication was continued by the Warfield family over the next century expanding into a small economic media empire with a glossy monthly magazine before being sold.

Following the death of Warfield in 1920, the Howard County Times was then owned by a local county partnership of Maryland Circuit Court Judge James A. Clark Sr. (1884-1955), Paul Talbot, and Paul Griffith ("Pete") Stromberg, (1892–1952), who took over as editor. Stromberg was later elected a state senator representing Howard County in the Maryland Senate (upper chamber of the Maryland General Assembly) and an editor of The Baltimore Sun, a major daily morning newspaper in Baltimore (then published since its 1837 by the longtime owners of the A. S. Abell Company of the Abell family and descendants (plus additional Black family of investors in 1910) of co-founder Arunah Shepherdson Abell (1806-1888). Coincidentally, decades later would see The Sunpapers along with its later syndicate chain owner, the Tribune Company (of the Chicago Tribune and the Los Angeles Times), would in turn also purchase and absorb the Howard County Times in a later merger with its last independent publisher, the Patuxent Publishing Company of Columbia, Maryland.

In 1940, Stromberg took control of the Maryland Printing and Publishing Company, which gave him sole ownership of the paper. Shortly after he took total control as publisher, the Ellicott City Times put out a special issue of 80 pages packed thick with ads and congratulatory notices plus photos, illustrations, and descriptive historical articles for its centennial in March 1941. Stromberg in turn created or purchased over the next few post-World War II years, 11 new local papers in the nearby growing suburban (Baltimore County) or outlying/surrounding Baltimore City communities and neighborhoods, eventually ringing around Baltimore in a horseshoe shaped arc, naming his syndicate the Stromberg Newspapers and employed his nephew Charles L Gerwig as editor. Some of these were the Arbutus Times, Catonsville Times, Owings Mills Times, Towson Times, The Jeffersonian, (Towson) Northeast Record, (Parkville / Carney / Overlea) Northeast Booster, [North] Baltimore Messenger (Baltimore City) and the Laurel Leader.

On November 12, 1958, after nearly 90 years, the name of The Ellicott City Times was changed to The Howard County Times to reflect increased county-wide coverage.

In 1965, The Columbia Times was created by Stromberg Newspapers as a spin-off newspaper for the new growing planned town of Columbia and its traditional main street of the small business district to the new growth in central Howard County. Stromberg's daughter, Doris Stromberg Thompson, took over as editor of the paper for the next 12 years from 1966 to 1978, and focused on the phenomenal growth of the new community and its villages.

=== Acquisition by Patuxent Publishing ===
The separate competing Columbia Flier was established by Zeke Orlinsky four years later after the start of the Columbia Times in 1969, and two years after Rouse began officially opening and publicizing development of Columbia after purchasing major land buys in secret in the central county during the mid-1960s. It formed a coupon flier for the new development of Columbia. As the new town grew quickly and additional surrounding villages were laid out, Orlinsky's paper served a larger market than the Times. The Stromberg Company syndicate eventually purchased the newer Flier paper. The editor, Tom Graham, used the paper to encourage the growth of Columbia, promoting political candidates who supported the vision of Rouse and the project.

In 1978, The Rouse Company architect Robert Moon designed a new headquarters building for the Patuxent Publishing Company in a modernist building leading into central Columbia. Moon's wife worked at the firm as well, becoming editor of the Columbia Flier and then general manager of Patuxent Publishing. The Baltimore Sun Media Group purchased Patuxent Publishing Company, including the ancient Howard County Times and newer Columbia Flier, integrating the local papers into its growing stable of several daily papers in several regional county seats and towns of several other suburban weekly community newspapers. The Patuxent Publishing/Columbia Flier building was put up for sale, but no tenants were signed up for sale for over three years. In 2014, former Baltimore Sun reporter and news editor and now public relations director for Howard County, David Nitkin, announced that the then-Howard County Executive Ken Ulman, directed the purchase of the Patuxent/Flier building by the county for $2.8 million dollars. County councilperson Mary Kay Sigaty announced the building where husband Tom Graham used to work as an editor would be rebuilt as a replacement headquarters for the county's Economic Development Authority and the Maryland Center for Entrepreneurship.

== Publishers ==
- Paul Griffith ("Pete") Stromberg, (1892-1952, partner/editor 1920-1940, owner/publisher 1940-1952)
- Zeke Orlinsky (Columbia Flier)
- Trif Alatzas (Baltimore Sun Media Group)

== See also ==
- List of newspapers in Maryland
