= Hilton, Maryland =

Unincorporated community in Maryland, U.S.

Coordinates: 39°15′17″N 76°49′17″W

Hilton is an unincorporated community located in Howard County in the state of Maryland, United States.

The crossroads community was formed along the crossroads of old Mantgomery road and Columbia Pike, one mile south of Ellicott City. In 1913, James Booker Clark built a mansion at Elkridge Farm resembling the White House, which was destroyed by fire on 2 July 1920, with a cracked water reservoir at a time when he was facing litigation against family for a failed coal mine project. A Target store in Long Gate shopping center now occupies the site. A National Guard Armory and later Long Gate Shopping Center dominate the eastern boundaries. The location address has been absorbed as part of Ellicott City.

== See also ==
- Temora (Ellicott City, Maryland)
- White Hall (Ellicott City, Maryland)
- Hagen House (Omar J Jones House)
