= Hickory Ridge, Columbia, Maryland =

Coordinates: 39°11′40″N 76°53′1″W

Hickory Ridge
- Village
- Interactive map of Hickory Ridge
- Country: United States
- State: Maryland
- City: Columbia
- Established: 1974
- Named after: Hickory Ridge Plantation

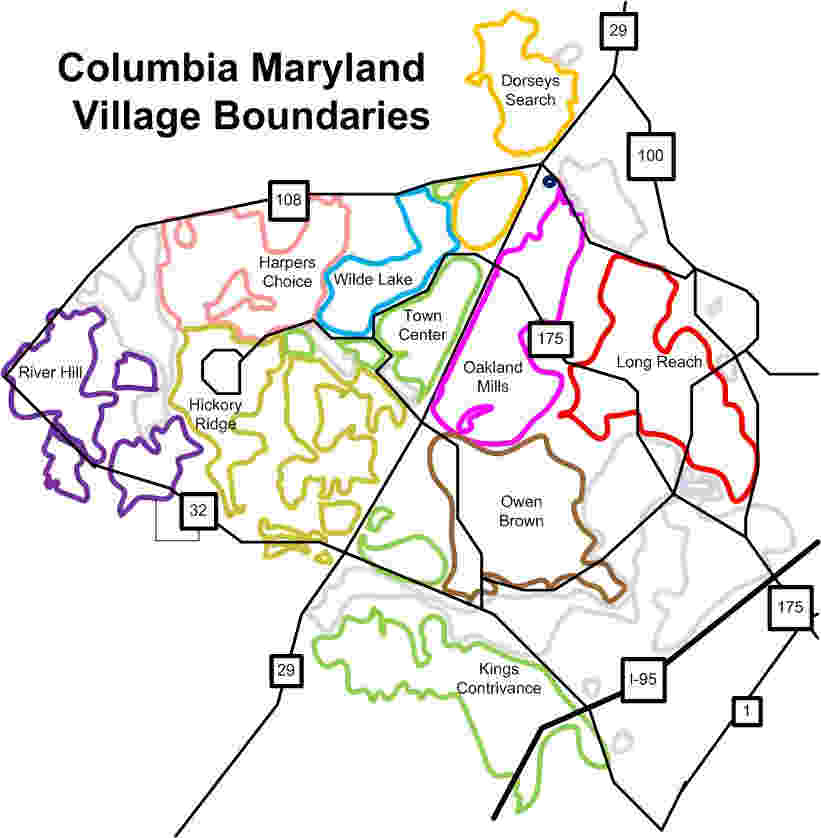
Villages of Columbia

Hickory Ridge is one of the 10 villages in Columbia, Maryland, United States, located to the west of the Town Center with a 2014 population of 13,000 in 4,659 housing units. The village overlays the former postal community of Elioak. It was first occupied in 1974. Neighborhoods in the village are Hawthorn, Clary's Forest, and Clemens Crossing. The name Hickory Ridge is derived from the 1749 estate "Hickory Ridge" in nearby Highland, which later became the family home of the nephew of hospital and university founder Johns Hopkins.

Clary's Forest is named after John Clary's 100-acre original land grant patented on 10 June 1734. Streets in Clary's Forest are based on the work of William Carlos Williams. Hawthorn is the name of an Amy Lowell poem. The street names come from her work. Clemens Crossing is named after American author Mark Twain, otherwise known as Samuel Clemens, and the street names come from Clemens' work.

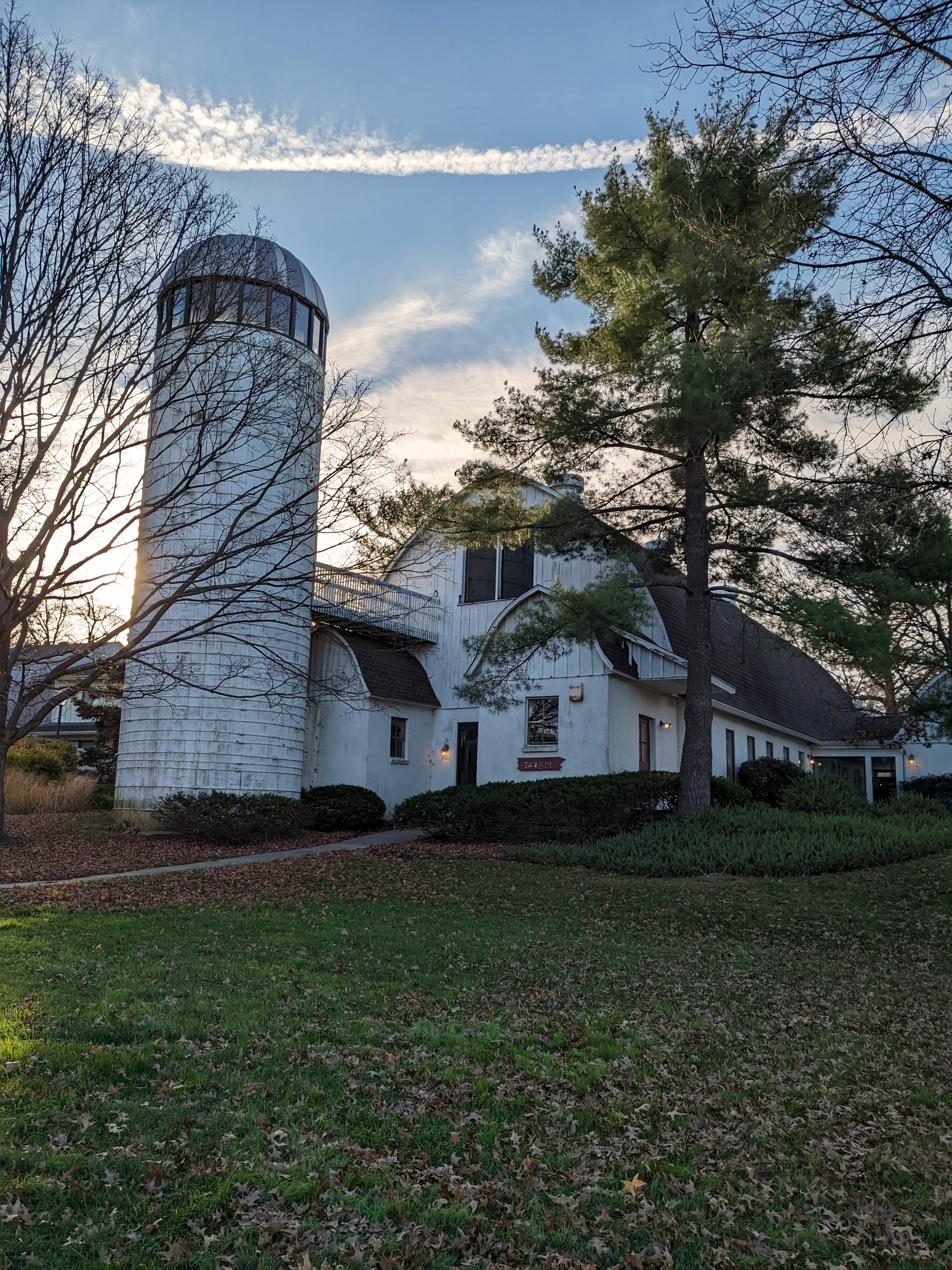
Historic preservation of the Kahler family farm silo

The land surrounding Sierra Villas Condominiums and Barnside Condominiums in Clary's Forest originally belonged to the Kahler family farm. The farm's silo remains in the condominium property. The Kahler farm was one of three large tracts originally purchased by Robert Moxley that started the Columbia project in 1963. Hickory Plaza was built on the site of Midway Farm, the last piece of a 400-acre (160 ha) farm owned by the Bassler family before the creation of the Rouse development.

== Services ==
The Village Center, opened in 1992, has a Giant Food grocery store, bank, restaurants, a gas station, and other establishments. It is the first village center in Columbia built without a collocated community center, which resides in the Hawthorn neighborhood. Howard County General Hospital is located in Hickory Ridge, at the intersection of Little Patuxent Parkway and Cedar Lane.

The Howard County public schools Clemens Crossing Elementary School and Atholton High School are located in Hickory Ridge. Howard Community College is also located in Hickory Ridge.

== Notable residents ==
- Linda Tripp, lived in Hickory Ridge during the Monica Lewinsky scandal
