= ClarkNet =

American internet service provider

ClarkNet was an Internet service provider (ISP) located in Ellicott City, Maryland that began operation in April 1993. It was the first ISP local to the Baltimore area and the second ISP native to Maryland. Operations ceased during 2003.

ClarkNet logo (1997).

The company's incorporated name was Clark Internet Services, Inc., the service was called ClarkNet, and it operated under the domain name of clark.net. ClarkNet was founded by Jamie Clark, son of Maryland State Senator James A. Clark, in April 1993. It was located on the Clark family farm, located between Clarksville, Maryland and Columbia, Maryland, and initially operated out of a working cow barn. Jamie Clark is deaf and most of the early employees were also deaf. As the company grew the offices moved to Columbia and the computer data center remained at the barn.

ClarkNet was a pioneer in many areas. It was the first ISP to provide dial-up TCP/IP access (via SLIP or PPP) targeted for the home user in the Mid Atlantic region. It was one of the first web servers in the world, listed by CERN as one of the first 100 web servers in existence and one of the first in the country to offer free web pages to its customers. It was the first ISP to provide local dial in access numbers to all of Baltimore, and many parts of Maryland. It was the second ISP native to Maryland. It was the country's first (only?) deaf owned and operated ISP. It pioneered the use of "Centrex ISDN" which is a 24x7 dedicated flat-rate ISDN line. It hosted, for a time, one of the top ten root Usenet servers.

ClarkNet enjoyed a great deal of press exposure because of its early entry into the Internet, the fact it was a deaf-owned company, its unusual location on a working farm, and its excellent reputation for service. Washington, DC area institutions used ClarkNet as their first exposure to the Internet which included, among many others: NPR (National Public Radio), SANS (the SANS Institute), and The Washington Post. Jamie Clark was interviewed and pictured in Fortune Magazine and was the subject of a feature spot on NPR. ClarkNet was the largest dial-up provider in the Baltimore/Washington area for a time. It won several awards, such as Small Business Administration awards.

The company employed up to 80 people at its largest. The company was structured with five primary teams: Engineering, Customer Service, Sales and Marketing, Web Development, Accounting, along with a senior management team and a board of directors. ClarkNet also rolled out a training curriculum for individuals and businesses to teach basic to advanced courses in web development and Internet research.

Services provided included: Dialup TCP/IP; Dialup shell access; Dedicated circuits such as ISDN, T1, Frame Relay, SMDS; Web hosting; Web development; Colocation hosting. At its largest it had over 20,000 dialup customers and 2,000 dedicated customers.

ClarkNet was purchased by Verio in late 1997 but retained a large degree of local autonomy and continued to grow under the Verio brand with many of the original ClarkNet employees in place. Verio was sold to NTT in 2000 by which time the product focus had shifted away from dial-up and dedicated Internet access to web hosting and most of the original ClarkNet staff, products and network were let-go, dismantled or sold (respectively) over the 2000-2003 period.

The barn on the Clark farm where ClarkNet started burned down in an accident on November 15, 2004, although the company was no longer in existence nor being used by Verio at the time.

== See also ==
- Clark's Elioak Farm
- One Maryland Inter-County Broadband Network - Howard County based broadband
