= Edwin Warfield III =

American politician (1924-1999)

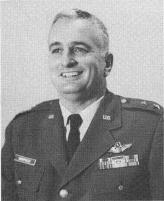

Adjutant General of Maryland
- In office 1970–1980
- Preceded by: George M. Gelston
- Succeeded by: Warren D. Hodges

Member of the Maryland House of Delegates from Howard County
- In office January 1963 – 1970
- Preceded by: James Clark, Jr. Daniel M. Murray, Jr.
- Succeeded by: J. Hugh Nichols

Personal details
- Born: June 3, 1924 Baltimore, Maryland, United States
- Died: October 4, 1999 (aged 75) St. Agnes Health-Care
- Party: Democratic
- Children: 5
- Relatives: Edwin Warfield (grandfather)
- Education: University of Maryland (BS)
- Military career
- Allegiance: United States
- Branch: United States Air Force
- Service years: 1943-45
- Conflicts: World War II

Edwin Warfield III (June 3, 1924 – October 4, 1999) was a Maryland State Delegate from Howard County, Maryland. Warfield was born at his family manor Oakdale, where his grandfather lived as Governor of Maryland. Warfield attended the Gilman School, then graduated in 1942 from the Kent School in Connecticut. He later attended Cornell University and the University of Maryland where he earned a B.S. in Agriculture.

Warfield was elected to the Howard General Assembly House of Delegates in 1963, but his slate lost all county council seats to Republicans on slow growth ballots that later approved the 100,000 person development of Columbia, Maryland in his home county. Warfield, Delegate William Hanna and Senator James A. Clark, Jr. would be the approvers of state money to provide road water and sewer for the Rouse project.

He was chair of the Agriculture and Natural Resources Committee from 1963-1970. He enlisted in the Army Air Corps in 1943; serving in the Pacific theater flying P-51 Mustangs through World War II. In 1950 he became the commander of the Maryland National Guard unit at Martin State Airport. From 1970 to 1980 he held the position of Adjutant general of Maryland.

He was the Chairman of the Board and Chief Executive of The Daily Record which was founded by his grandfather Edwin Warfield. He sat on the Governor's Commission on the Expansion of the University of Maryland. He created the Warfield Commission on higher education in Maryland, which recommended consolidating state colleges under the University of Maryland. He was also part of the World War II Memorial Commission.

He was also a member of the Howard County Hunt Club, Maryland Club, South River Club, Sons of the American Revolution, Bachelors Cotillion, St. Andrew Episcopal Church in Glenwood and St. John Episcopal Church in Ellicott City.

Warfield died of congestive heart failure October 4, 1999.

== See also ==
- Edwin Warfield - Grandfather - Governor of Maryland
- Warfield Air National Guard Base - Named after Edwin Warfeild III
- A History of the Adjutants General of Maryland
- Oakdale Manor
