= Spring Hill Farm (Ellicott City, Maryland) =

Historic slave plantation in the U.S.

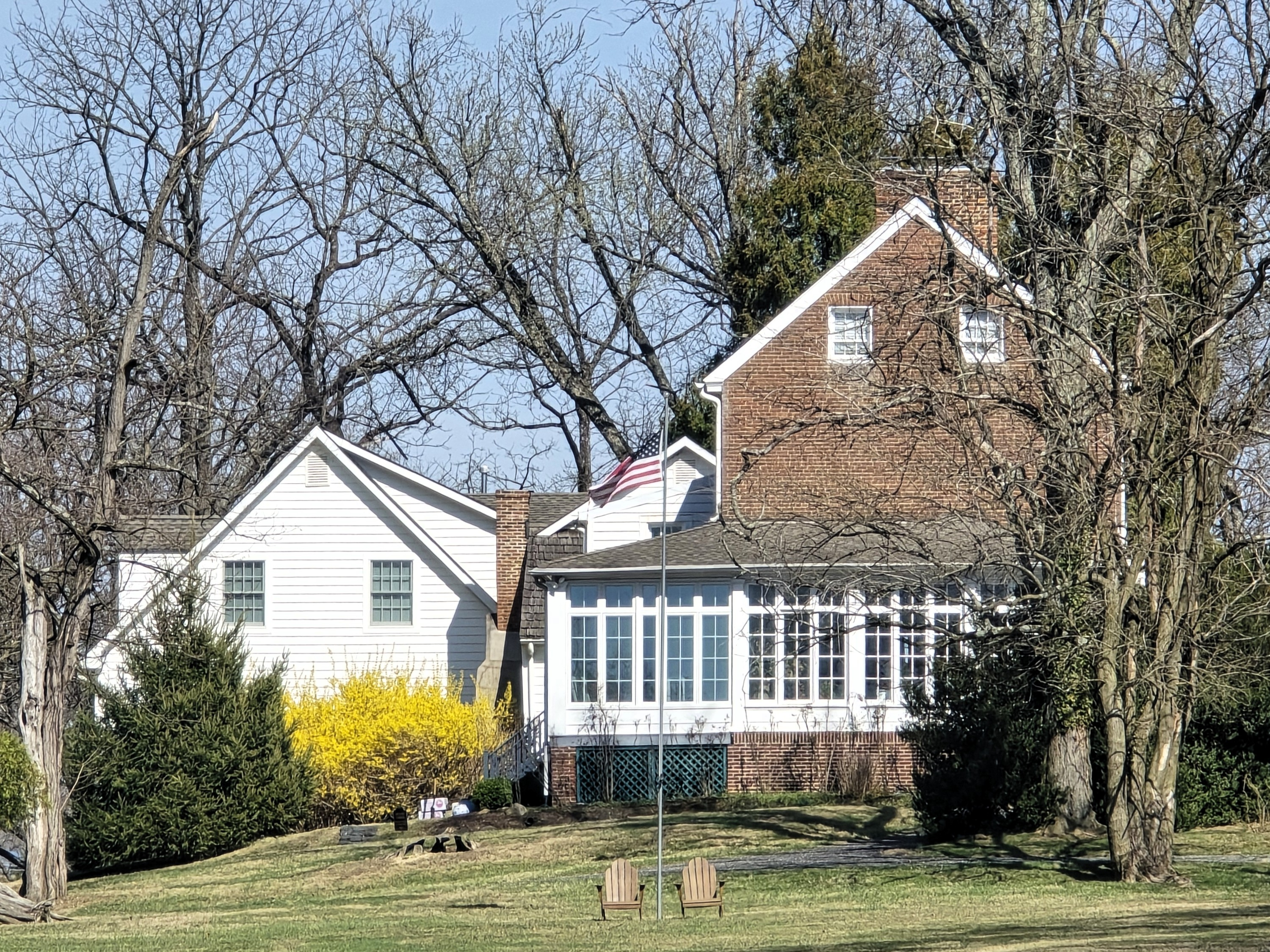
- March 2026

- Location within Maryland
- Interactive map of Spring Hill Farm
- 39°14′37″N 76°48′09″W
- Nearest city: Ellicott City, Maryland

History
- Built: 1790

Site notes
- Architectural style: Stone

The Spring Hill Farm is a historic slave plantation located in Ellicott City in Howard County, Maryland, United States.

The site south of the Patapsco River produced Native American arrowheads in routine farming. The farm is part of a 900-acre land patent granted in 1695 named "Chews Resolution Manor". The property was a gift of Caleb Dorsey of Belmont to his daughter Rebecca and her husband Charles Ridgely creating the parcel "Rebecca's Lot". The main house was built about 1804. The property contains the Spring Hill quarters, a stone structure dating to 1790 built originally as a home for Edward Hill Dorsey. The structure has served as slave quarters, a carriage house with modern remodeling of the interior in the 1950s.

The farm was later owned by the Clark family who also resided to the south at Fairfield Farm. Owner Garnett "Booker" Clark used the outbuildings to make and store whiskey during prohibition. Garnett's brother James "Booker" Clark maintained his credibility as a revenue officer by destroying the operation. About ten outbuildings of the farm are identified in 1790 tax rolls. By the 1970s the farm had been subdivided down to two parcels totaling 11 acres, with a large power-line easement and the New Cut Landfill facility occupying the northern tracts.

In 2000, Glen Mar Church purchased 21 acres of the farmland from the Baugher family for a new church which they moved into in 2008.

== See also ==
- List of Howard County properties in the Maryland Historical Trust
- Fairfield Farm - Adjoining farm to the south
- New Cut Landfill
- Pushpin Farm - A nearby farm also owned by Col Edward Dorsey
