= William S. Hanna =

American politician

Member of the Maryland House of Delegates
- In office January 1963 – January 1966
- Constituency: Howard County

Howard County Council
- In office 1969–1973

Personal details
- Born: May 9, 1923 Baltimore, Maryland, U.S.
- Died: November 28, 1994 (aged 71)
- Party: Democratic
- Spouse: Betty Jean Kruse Hanna
- Children: Gary William Hanna, Edwin Fulton Hanna III

William S. Hanna (May 9, 1923 - November 28, 1994) was a member of the Maryland House of Delegates.

Hanna was raised at the Temora Mansion in Ellicott City. In 1936, he built a homemade trailer with his friend, future senator James Clark Jr. While traveling with Clark to the West Coast he was run over by a car in San Diego with only a sprained ankle as an injury. He graduated Ellicott City High School in 1943. Hanna served in the U.S. Army Air Corps and U.S. Air Force during World War II flying as a gunner on B-24 bombers.

In 1962, Hanna was selected by his childhood friend to run on a slate of candidates for Maryland State Delegate with Thomas E. Loyd.

Hanna was also a Real estate broker and appraiser. Appraiser and negotiator, Patapsco Valley Park project. President, Howard County Real Estate Board, 1961-63. District vice-president, Maryland Association of Real Estate Boards. Member, Rotary; Veterans of Foreign Wars.

Hanna's son Gary, a helicopter pilot, was killed in Vietnam. In 1986 Hanna retired from his family company Breckinridge and Hanna real estate.

== Political ==
Secretary, Howard County Board of Trade, 1957-1959. Hanna was elected to the House of Delegates representing Howard County from 1963-1966. William Hanna, Edwin Wafield and Senator James Clark Jr. would be the approvers of state money to provide road water and sewer for Columbia, MD. In 1969 he was elected to the new County Council form of government in Howard County. In December 1971, Hanna replaces Edward L. Cochran as chairman of the Howard County Council by a 3-2 vote.
