= Worthington's Range =

- Location within Maryland
- 39°12′07″N 76°56′31″W
- Nearest city: Clarksville, Maryland

Site notes
- Architectural styles: Log house, Gambrel

Worthington's Range, also called "Howard's Chance", "Howard's Range", or "Tierney Gambrel Roof House", is a historic slave plantation located between Clarksville, Columbia and Simpsonville in Howard County, Maryland, United States.

Rachel Worthington ( - 1776) settled the site in 1753, carving out 369 acres of "Worthington's Range" from her husbands existing slave plantation. The house is the birthplace of Paul Griffith Stromberg. The "Miller Cemetery" lies about two hundred feet Northwest from the house. It was destroyed by arson in 1977.

In 2014, former Howard County Department of Planning and Zoning director's firm Land Design and Development petitioned the planning board to subdivide the historic property and cemetery for a 150 unit housing development called "Enclave at Tierney Farm". Density was increased by having the county extend sewer service to the rural property. The project was delayed a single year because of an indefinite lack of school capacity in the region.

== See also ==
- Paul Griffith Stromberg
