= Iglehart House (Columbia, Maryland) =

- Iglehart House, March 1979
- Location: Columbia, Maryland
- Coordinates: 39°11′51″N 76°51′09″W
- Built: 1846
- Architectural style(s): Stone

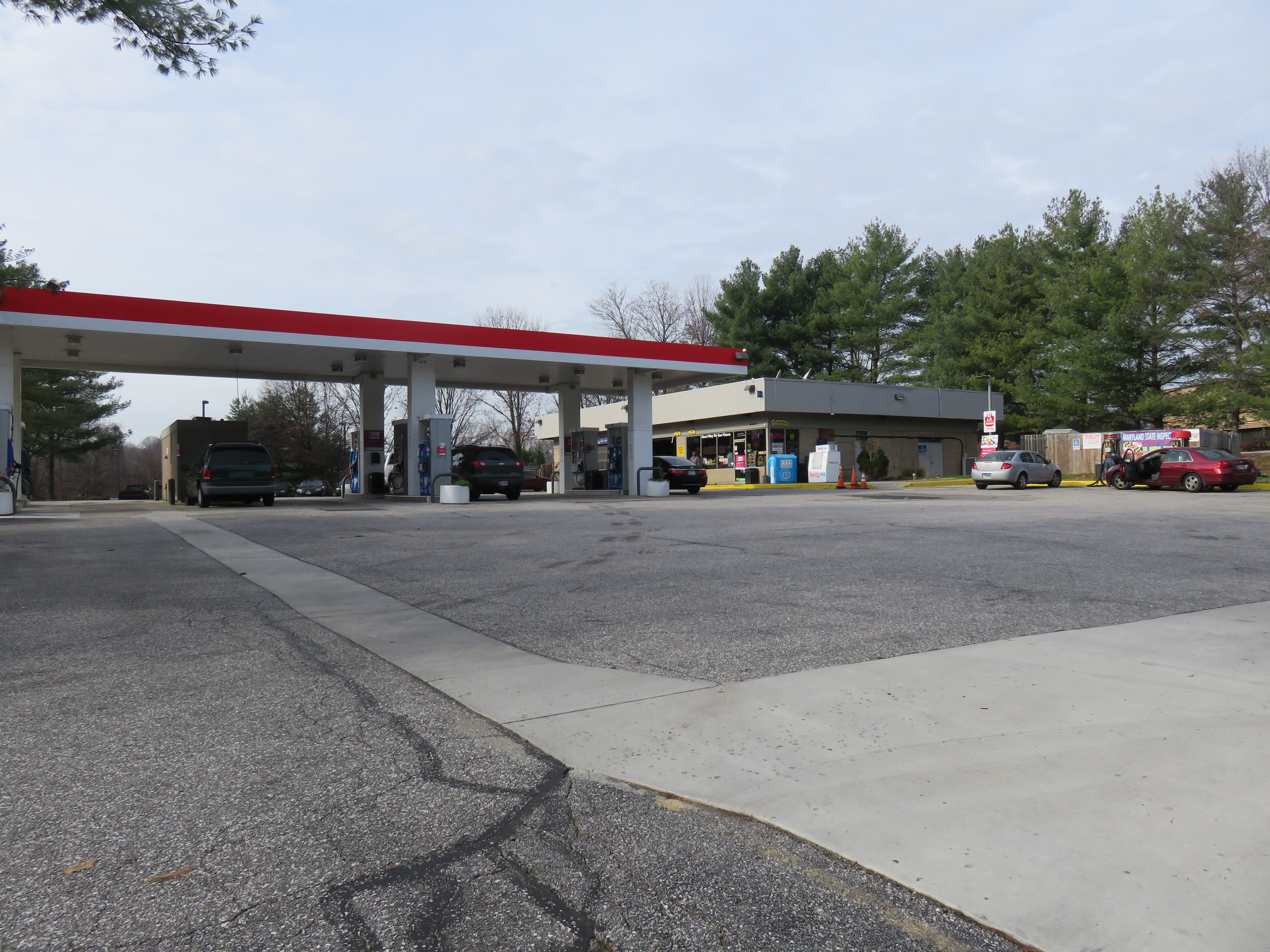
Stevens Forest Exxon is the previous location of Iglehart House

The Iglehart House (c. 1846) was a historic home located in Columbia, Maryland, Howard County, Maryland, now part of the Rouse Company land development.

The property was originally an undeveloped 119-acre tract of land granted by Edward T. Iglehart to his daughter Sussanah. The land was called "Joseph's Gift". She married William Harding, who probably built the house on the property around 1846. The Iglehart house was a two bay wide, two and a half bay stucco covered stone house. The stone structure matched construction style of the nearby Hickory Ridge.

The Iglehart family was prominent in Howard county leadership in the early 1800s in the antebellum era of tobacco slave plantations. The farm was later owned by Peter Johnson. In 1978, the property was recommended for inclusion in the National Register of Historic Places for its historic architecture and excellent condition. Howard Research and Development purchased the property, subdivided the farm, and demolished the stone house to build an Exxon gas station.

== See also ==
- List of Howard County properties in the Maryland Historical Trust
- Simpsonville, Maryland
