= Enchanted Forest (Maryland) =

Former theme park in Maryland, US

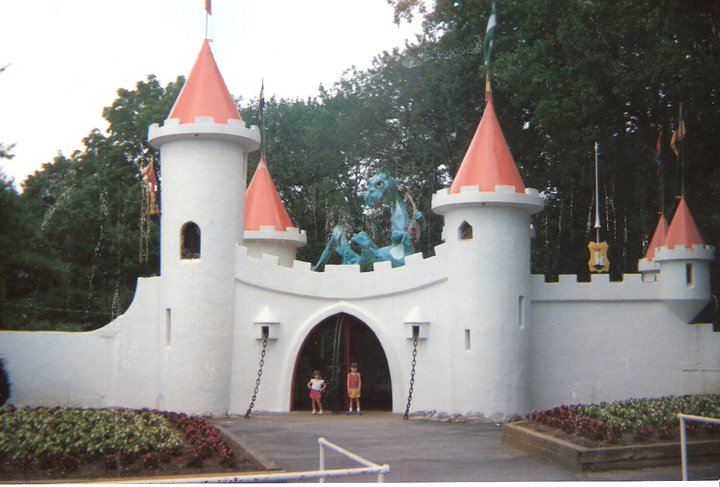
- Enchanted Forest entrance in 1987
- Interactive map of Enchanted Forest
- Location: Howard County, Maryland
- Coordinates: 39°16′49″N 76°51′24″W
- Status: Defunct
- Opened: August 15, 1955; 71 years ago
- Closed: 1995; 31 years ago
- Theme: Nursery rhymes and fairy tales
- Operating season: Summer
- Attendance: 300,000
- Area: 52 acres (210,000 m^{2})

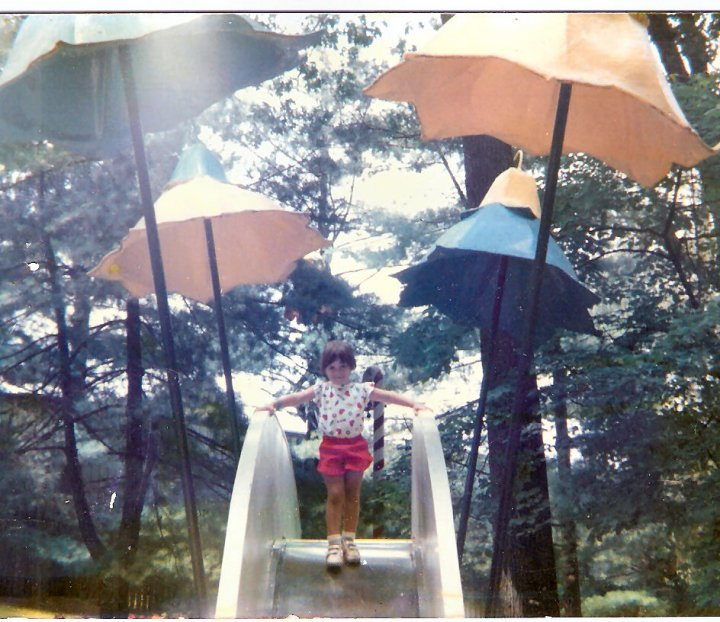
The Sliding Board in 1987.

The Enchanted Forest was a theme park in Ellicott City, Maryland, on U.S. Route 40 (Baltimore National Pike) near the intersection with Bethany Lane. Other theme parks with the same name have since opened elsewhere.

== History ==
The Enchanted Forest officially opened on August 15, 1955, following a preview party the afternoon before — one month after Disneyland Park's opening. Appealing mostly to families with small children, the park had a nursery rhyme theme. The park featured fairy tale buildings and characters, but no mechanical rides originally. Track rides were added later, including the Alice in Wonderland ride with teacup-shaped cars, a Cinderella's castle ride with mice for the cars, the "Little Toot" boat that took children to Mount Vesuvius for giant slides, and the Jungleland Safari which was driven by open Land Rover-type vehicles. Children's birthday parties were often held in the picnic areas among the attractions; many local teenagers worked as ticket-takers at the park. Unlike many other attractions of the time, the Enchanted Forest was integrated from the day it opened.

Admission cost one dollar for adults and fifty cents for children. The park expanded from 20 acres (81,000 m^{2}) to 52 acres (210,000 m^{2}). At its peak, the Enchanted Forest welcomed 300,000 children per summer season. After its original owners, the Harrison family, sold the park for $4.5 million to JHP Development in 1988, the park closed for the first time in 1989. After turning more than half the land (primarily the parking lots) into the Safeway-anchored Enchanted Forest Shopping Center in 1992, JHP Development reopened the park for the 1994 summer season, predominantly for children's birthday parties.

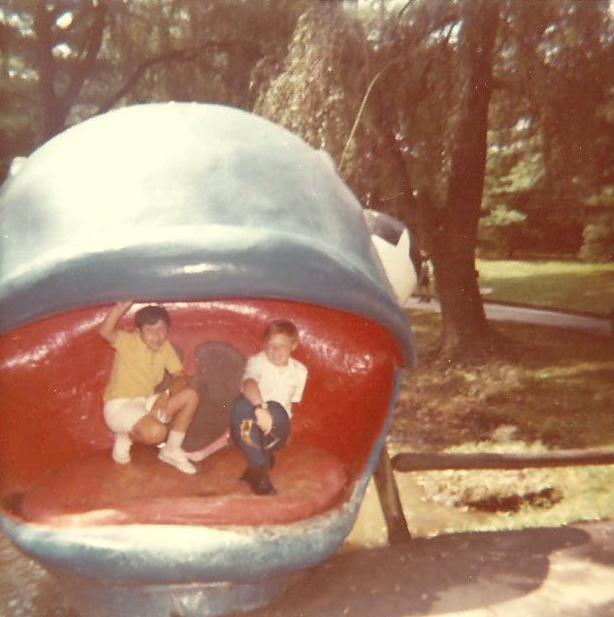
Willie the Whale in 1972.

The park was permanently shuttered from 1995 to 2005, when active preservation began. Much of the theme park sat undisturbed yet neglected behind a chain-link fence. On June 30, 1998, the post office opened the Enchanted Forest branch onsite. In 1999, the Friends of the Enchanted Forest was formed with the goal of reopening the park and then in 2003 the Enchanted Forest Preservation Society was formed with the long-term goal of reviving the Enchanted Forest. Their work focused on preventing the artifacts from being lost forever.

The owner of the land, Kimco Realty Group, agreed in 2004 to allow most of the fairy tale structures and figures to be moved to nearby Clark's Elioak Farm for display and preservation. Moving and restoration began in 2005. Contributions were still being welcomed in 2011, although many of the exhibits had been restored and returned to service at the farm. In 2013, the Howard County Department of Planning and Zoning approved Kimco to build a bank next to the castle site and wetlands by rerouting the stream that ran around the base. In 2015, Martha Clark announced the concrete block Castle would be relocated to Elioak, while the Cinderella Castle and the Gingerbread House would be demolished.

== Appearances in popular culture ==
- Part of the John Waters movie Cry-Baby, released in April 1990 and starring Johnny Depp and Ricki Lake, took place in the Enchanted Forest; the entrance to the park was used to begin the scene, but most of the interior scenes of the park were actually shot at Hershey Park, in Hershey, PA, with the exception of the Cinderella castle scene
- The park appears in the horror movie Fear of Clowns.
- Episode 43 of the TV series Homicide: Life on the Street (season 4), titled "The Hat", was filmed at the Enchanted Forest.
- The 2009 novel Closed for the Season by Mary Downing Hahn was inspired by Hahn's trips to the Enchanted Forest; photos of the park appear on the book's cover.

== See also ==
- Clark's Elioak Farm
