= Highland, Maryland =

Unincorporated community in Maryland, United States

- Census-designated place
- Location in Maryland
- Coordinates: 39°10′44.7″N 76°57′27.7″W
- Country: United States of America
- State: Maryland
- County: Howard

Area
  - Total: 2.42 sq mi (6.27 km^{2})
  - Land: 2.41 sq mi (6.23 km^{2})
  - Water: 0.015 sq mi (0.04 km^{2})
- Elevation: 520 ft (160 m)

Population (2020)
  - Total: 1,133
  - Density: 471/sq mi (181.8/km^{2})
- Time zone: UTC-5 (EST)
  - Summer (DST): UTC-4 (EDT)
- ZIP Code: 20777
- Area codes: 301, 240
- FIPS code: 24-38475

Highland is an unincorporated community and census-designated place in Howard County, Maryland, United States. As of the 2020 census it had a population of 1,133. It uses the 20777 ZIP code.

== Geography ==
The community is located in southern Howard County at the junction of Highland Road, Maryland Route 216 and Maryland Route 108, and is still heavily influenced by its agrarian history; farms and horse fields are common in the area. The crossroads itself has a small-town feel, with various shops including some that share in the town history. Clarksville is 2 miles (3 km) to the north on MD 108, Laurel is 9 miles (14 km) to the southeast on MD 216, and Olney is 7 miles (11 km) to the west on MD 108. The center of Columbia is 8 miles (13 km) to the northeast.

== Demographics ==
Historical population
Census	Pop.	Note	%±
2010	1,034		—
2020	1,133		9.6%
U.S. Decennial Census

== The crossroads ==
As a rural crossroads, many of its community members took it upon themselves to maintain the historical sites and feel of the hamlet by founding the Greater Highland Crossroads Association (GHCA) in 2002. In 2014, the Crossroads were placed on the Preserve Howard top ten most endangered list due to current DPZ plans. They are marked by four signs.

== History ==
The majority of the downtown Highland district is situated within the 418-acre (169 ha) land grant named "Hickory Ridge". The Rouse Company borrowed the land grant name for one of its nearby villages of Columbia, built in 1974. The historic "White Hall" or "Hickory Ridge" estate (1749) was owned by the Ridgely, Hopkins and Disney families. One of the earliest businesses at the crossroads was Well's tavern, founded by Richard Wells in 1759. This was replaced with a wheelwright's shop by Joshua B. Disney in 1842. The same year, William Wall opened a general store and post office, giving the crossroads the short-lived name of "Walls Crossroads" before another name change of the post office on December 2, 1878, to "Highland" to reflect the town's elevation in Howard County. The County Commissioners added Hall Shop Road on the southern side of the community in 1877. The town did not receive direct rail service, but was only nine miles away from the B&O railroad in Laurel, Maryland using the rolling road now known as Route 216.

A literary club formed in Highland in the late 19th century; J. B. Warfield in describing the Highland of 1904 refers to it as the "literary center of the county".

Highland played several important roles in U.S. history. The town is believed to have hosted meetings of anti-British men who influenced the 1774 burning of the Peggy Stewart in Annapolis, the year after the Boston Tea Party protest. Well's Tavern (now the Kitty Bed and Breakfast) was the primary meeting place of a group of Northern sympathizers in the Civil War.

The Virginia Hardy Boarding School provided classes for students during the turn of the century.

In 2015, the group Preservation Howard County placed the crossroads on its top 10 most endangered site list.
