= Gertrude Poe =

American journalist and businesswoman (1915–2017)

- Born: September 21, 1915; Granite, Maryland
- Died: July 13, 2017 (aged 101); Ashton, Maryland
- Education: Laurel High School (1931); Washington College of Law (J.D. 1939)
- Occupations: Journalist, lawyer, real estate agent, insurance agent, and radio broadcaster

Gertrude Louise Poe (September 21, 1915 – July 13, 2017) was an American journalist, lawyer, real estate agent, insurance agent, and radio broadcaster who served as the editor of Laurel Leader in Laurel, Maryland from 1939 to 1980. She was known as "Maryland's First Lady of Journalism."

== Life and career ==
Poe was born in Granite, Maryland in 1915, the youngest of five daughters of Worthy and Bertha Poe, and moved with her family to nearby Laurel as a child. Shortly after graduating from Laurel High School at the age of fifteen in 1931, Poe was hired by local attorney George McCeney to work as a secretary in his law offices, which were located at 357 Main Street in Laurel. After five years of working as a legal secretary, she matriculated to the Washington College of Law, where she graduated with her J.D. degree in 1939.

=== The Leader ===
Upon graduating, Poe returned to the McCeney's law firm with the intention of joining the firm as an attorney. The head of the office, G. Bowie McCeney, the son of by then-deceased George McCeney, instead named Poe the editor of The Leader, a paper he had acquired the previous year from its founder, James P. Curley.

"He [McCeney] hands me a copy [of the Leader] with a grin and says, 'My career as an editor just ended. Yours is just beginning." Poe protested this assignment, reflecting in a column in 1980: "I am stunned. I am indignant. Law is my love. I know nothing about writing...With considerable disinclination, I take up my new duties." McCeney's intention was that Poe operate the paper while studying for the bar exam.

Under Poe's guidance, the Leader shifted its coverage model from national news to a focus on local news, and in 1946 the paper changed its name to The News Leader when it merged with The Bowie Register, The Beltsville Banner, and The College Park News, each of which were also owned by G. Bowie McCeney. Previously, Poe had served as the editor of all three of those publications as well. In 1950 Poe joined McCeney as co-publisher and business partner of The News Leader, while remaining its editor.

For the first two decades of the paper, Poe was forced to perform numerous roles in order to ensure it published on a weekly schedule. "I guess from 1939 until about 1956 or 1957, it was a one-woman show. I sold the ads, made them up, wrote the copy, went to the printing plant, proofread and saw the newspaper locked up and printed. Then I brought the paper home with me and put it in the mail." Beginning in the late 1950s, after the National Security Agency moved to nearby Fort Meade, Poe increased coverage of military and on-base issues, and was later awarded a Patriotic Civilian Service Award for her efforts. As part of her duties as an editor Poe drew attention to positive news in the city, and was known to write letters to the editor to the Washington Post and other papers which published negative stories about the city of Laurel.

Shortly after G. Bowie McCeney died in 1978, Poe began to consider selling the Leader and retiring. In 1980 she sold the paper to the Patuxent Publishing Company; her last day at the Laurel Leader was June 26, 1980—the 2,132nd issue of the Leader she oversaw as editor. In retirement, Poe remained active in Laurel-area charitable and religious organizations. In 1988 she endowed the Gertrude Poe Fund for Journalism Excellence at the Philip Merrill College of Journalism at the University of Maryland, which "supports student scholarships in the Merrill College, with preference given to students with an interest in community journalism." Her autobiography, Lady Editor, was published in 2014.

=== Other businesses ===
Poe operated the Gertrude L. Poe Agency, an insurance agency which was previously owned and operated by G. Bowie McCeney under the name the G. Bowie McCeney Agency. In the late 1960s Poe delivered a daily, five-minute news report on WLMD, a Laurel radio station.

=== Final years and death ===
Poe never married or had children, and was very close with her three nieces and their children and grandchildren. In 2015, she was the honorary chairwoman of an annual luncheon the state of Maryland holds to honor residents 100 years or older. In a Laurel Leader article on the occasion of her 100th birthday, Poe wrote that hers had been "a good life and a good livelihood." She died at her home in Ashton on July 13, 2017, at age 101.

== Awards and honors ==
- 1958: First woman elected president of the Maryland Press Association (now the Maryland-Delaware-D.C. Press Association)
- 1963: Patriotic Civilian Service Award
- 1967: Given Emma C. McKinney Award of Merit, National Newspaper Association
- 1976: Named "Woman of the Year" by Xi Alpha Zeta Chapter of Beta Sigma Pi International Sorority
- 1987: First living person, first woman inducted into the Maryland-Delaware-D.C. (MDDC) Press Association Hall of Fame
- 2008: Honorary chairman, MDDC Press Association 100th year gala
- 2011: Inducted into the Maryland Women's Hall of Fame
- 2015: Honorary chairwoman at state of Maryland luncheon for residents having 100 or more birthdays
