= Laurel Leader =

Newspaper in Laurel, Maryland

- Front page of The Leader from November 26, 1897
- Type: Weekly newspaper
- Format: Tabloid
- Owner: Alden Global Capital
- Founder: James Curley
- Publisher: Trif Alatzas
- Founded: 1897; 129 years ago
- Ceased publication: October 13, 2022
- Language: English
- Headquarters: Baltimore, Maryland
- Website: laurelleader.com

The Laurel Leader was a weekly newspaper which had been published continually since 1897, serving the greater Laurel, Maryland, area, including Prince George's, Montgomery, Anne Arundel, and Howard Counties. In its final form, The Leader operated as a subsidiary of The Baltimore Sun.

== History ==
=== Paper ownership ===
In 1897, James Curley founded The Leader in Laurel. Between 1897 and 1980, the ownership passed from Curley to G. Bowie McCeney to Gertrude Poe. In July 1980, Patuxent Publishing Company bought the newspaper. In September 1997, Patuxent Publishing was sold to The Baltimore Sun which was a subsidiary of Times Mirror. In June 2000, Tribune Publishing purchased Times Mirror and thus the Baltimore Sun, Patuxent Publishing, and the Laurel Leader.

=== James Curley era (1897–1938) ===
In 1897 attorney James Curley founded The Leader, a weekly newspaper serving the approximately 2,600 residents of the city of Laurel, MD. It replaced the Free Quill, one of at least six newspapers which existed in the city in the second half of the nineteenth century. Curley created the Leader to "further his business interests and rally local Republicans," and the paper focused on national and sensational news rather than local news. Of the eight pages published each week, six consisted of national and international news while the only two were devoted to local news as well as advertisements. Curley was the paper's editor until 1938, when he gave up a half-interest in the paper as partial repayment of a mortgage debt, and sold the other half to the debt collector, G. Bowie McCeney.

=== Gertrude Poe era (1938–1980) ===
After James Curley sold the paper to G. Bowie McCeney, McCeney served as editor for six months before appointing Gertrude Poe editor in 1939. Poe had previously worked in McCeney's office and had recently graduated from American University's law school when she was hired as the Leader's editor rather than joining McCeney's firm as an attorney. "He [McCeney] hands me a copy [of the Leader] with a grin and says, 'My career as an editor just ended. Yours is just beginning." Poe served as the Leader's editor until 1980, while McCeney remained the paper's publisher until 1978. In 1946 the paper's name was changed to The News Leader, after merging with the Bowie Register and The College Park News, two other papers owned by McCeney. From 1939 until the late 1950s, the Leader was a "one woman show," with Poe serving as advertising salesperson, graphic designer, copywriter, proofreader, and distributor as well as editor. Under Poe's leadership the focus of the paper shifted from national to local news, and increasingly catered to the local military population based at nearby Fort Meade. In addition, the paper made a strong effort to focus on positive news in the city. In 1992 Poe was quoted in an interview stating: "Maybe I was a little lopsided...I still think the media in general focuses too much on the bad news...There are so many good people. That exposure in the paper means so much to them and their stories can inspire others."

During Poe's tenure as editor the Leader covered major national news stories related to Laurel, including the attempted assassination of presidential candidate George Wallace and the destruction of the 9th Street Bridge and several parts of downtown Laurel during Hurricane Agnes. For her work, Poe received a number of major awards and honors. In 1958 she was the first woman elected president of the Maryland Press Association, the first woman elected to that position, and in 1967 was the second ever winner of the Emma C. McKinney Award given by the National Newspaper Association. In 1987 she was the first ever living person elected into the Maryland–Delaware–D.C. Press Association Hall of Fame, and in 2011 she was elected to the Maryland Women's Hall of Fame.

=== Karen Yengich era (1980–1990) ===
In 1980, Poe retired as editor and sold the paper to newspaper chain Patuxent Publishing Company, who renamed it The Laurel Leader and appointed Assistant Editor Karen Yengich as editor. Yengich had worked for the Leader for eight years; her first assignment was to cover George Wallace's speech at Laurel Shopping Center on May 18, 1972, where Arthur Bremer attempted to assassinate Wallace. Yengich oversaw an increased focus in the paper on photography and feature articles, with a strong interest in the city's growth. She was awarded the John Hay Whitney Award in 1988, which included a year spent working at the International Herald Tribune in Paris.

=== Joe Murchison era (1990–2007) ===
When Yengich left the Leader in 1990 she was replaced by Joe Murchison, a longtime professional journalist who had previously worked for the Fauquier Democrat, Richmond News Leader, and Columbia Flier, and who had been a reporter at the Leader since 1985, serving as acting editor in 1988–89 while Yengich was taking a year of absence. Under Murchison's guidance, the paper shifted from a broadsheet format to tabloid in January 1994, and changed from a paid to free circulation model. While Murchison was editor of the paper, major stories which appeared in the Leader included its local coverage of the 9/11 terror attacks. Hijacker Hani Hanjour had stayed at the Valencia Motel in Laurel prior to the attack.

In 2007, Murchison retired as editor of the Leader. In 2021, he retired after serving nearly a dozen years as executive director of Side by Side, a non-profit organization based in Laurel.

=== Melanie Dzwonchyk era and beyond (2008–present) ===
From 2007 to 2008, the editor of the Laurel Leader was Pete Pichaske. In August 2008 he was replaced by Melanie Dzwonchyk, who began working at the Leader as a freelance writer in 1993 and joined the paper's staff in 1995, serving as features editor under Joe Murchison. Several months later, in December 2008, the Leader's offices moved to the Patuxent Publishing Co. headquarters in Columbia, Maryland, and in December 2013 the Leader moved again, this time to the Baltimore Sun building in Baltimore.

In January 2014, Dzwonchyk was appointed news editor of the Howard County Times and the Columbia Flier, while continuing as editor of the Leader. She retired in 2017.

In 2021, The Baltimore Sun announced the paper would no longer have Laurel-specific coverage but would share material from The Sun and other Tribune publications. The October 13, 2022, edition included a note to readers in fine print on the cover, indicating that the newspaper would be ceasing print publication effective immediately.

The Sun was sold to Alden Global Capital in 2021, then sold to Sinclair Broadcast Group executive chairman David D. Smith in January 2024.

=== In popular culture ===
The Leader was the focus of a "Ripped from the Headlines: Laurel in the News" exhibit which opened at the Laurel Museum in February 2015 and explored the paper's coverage of local and national news throughout its existence.
