= Catonsville Times =

The Catonsville Times is the weekly community newspaper for Catonsville, Maryland, USA.

In 1997 the Baltimore Sun Group bought Patuxent Publishing's the Catonsville Times and other local newspapers around the Baltimore area and later began selling off associated property assets.

== Sources ==
- Official website
