= Hickory Ridge (Highland, Maryland) =

- Location within Maryland Location within the United States
- Interactive map of Hickory Ridge
- 39°11′10″N 76°57′50″W
- Location: 13032 Highland Road, Highland, Maryland
- Nearest city: Highland, Maryland

History
- Built: 1749

Site notes
- Architectural style: Georgian architecture

Hickory Ridge or White Hall is an historic property located in Highland in Howard County, Maryland, United States. It is registered in the Maryland Inventory of Historic Properties.

The 500-acre property known as Hickory Ridge was surveyed by Henry Ridgely III (1690–1749) ("Col. Henry Ridgely"), a grandson of pioneering surveyor Henry Ridgely (1640–1710) who had been granted land by George II of Great Britain. On Henry Ridgely III's death in 1749, the tract was deeded to his son Greenberry Ridgely (1726–1783), who built a stone cottage the same year, which still stands. In 1760 or 1789, Ridgely began building the Georgian architecture primary residence. The building is a two-and-a-half-story structure made of Flemish bond brick. The farm had enslaved labor who worked in fields of tobacco and wheat, and were housed in stone "Quarters". Greenberry Ridgely's son Nicholas Greenberry Ridgely (1764–1829), a rich wine merchant in Baltimore, inherited the property in 1800 and added on to the main house. The property was then acquired by the Adams family.

Samuel and Martha Smith Hopkins acquired the property^{[from who?]} in either the 1850s or 1877, naming it "White Hall" after the birthplace of Samuel, and his uncle the hospital/university founder Johns Hopkins. The Hopkins family lived there for 75 years. It is where Maryland State Senate President James A. Clark, Jr.'s mother Alda Hopkins was born and raised.

It was sold^{[by who?]} to Henry H. Owens who restored the "Hickory Ridge" name. The following owners Richard Jenkins and his wife restored the property to its historical character, beginning in 1972, and oversaw its inclusion in the Maryland Inventory of Historic Properties, in 1977. Jenkins sold the property in 1983 to John McDaniel, founder and Chief Executive Officer of MedStar Health (ret. 2006). "Since I've been there, we’ve hosted every governor," McDaniel said, who listed the property for sale in 2019.

Horses have long been a tradition. Samuel Harold Hopkins, son of the Samuel Hopkins who bought the property, was a founder and former president of the racetrack in Laurel, Maryland. He held the Horse Show at Highland on the estate. John McDaniel was a longtime Maryland racing commissioner, and expanded the equestrian facilities to breed thoroughbreds.

== See also ==
- List of Howard County properties in the Maryland Historical Trust
- Hickory Ridge, Columbia, Maryland
- Iglehart House (Columbia, Maryland)
