= James A. Clark Sr. =

Maryland circuit court judge (1884–1955)

- Born: October 22, 1884; Fairfield Farm, Ellicott City, Maryland, US
- Died: March 25, 1955 (aged 70); Ellicott City, Maryland, US
- Occupation: Judge
- Known for: Maryland State's Attorney
- Political party: Democratic
- Spouse: Alda Tyson Hopkins
- Children: 4, including James Jr.

James A. Clark Sr. (October 22, 1884 – March 25, 1955) was the Circuit Judge appointed by Maryland Governor Herbert O'Conor.

== Biography ==
James A. Clark Sr. was born at Fairfield Farm, Ellicott City, Maryland. He was a fifth Circuit Court judge whose family's roots in Howard County, Maryland, traced back to 1797. His wife was Alda Tyson Hopkins, whose family line traced back to the Ellicott and Hopkins families (she was a relative of the philanthropist Johns Hopkins). James and Alda Hopkins Clark lived at Keewaydin, a farm located near Ellicott City, and also owned a nearby farm known as Elioak Farm. They had four sons: John (born in 1914), Samuel (died in 1923), James (born in 1918), and Joseph (born in 1927).

As a child, he worked for a Mr. Whipps at the Oakland Mills Blacksmith House and Shop. He graduated from Rock Hill College and St. John's College in Annapolis. During World War II, he served as the Chairman of the Howard County Draft Board. Clark served for a term as Maryland State's Attorney. Clark retired from the Circuit Court on October 22, 1954, and died on March 25, 1955, from a heart attack.

== See also ==
- Fairfield Farm
