= One Maryland Inter-County Broadband Network =

The One Maryland Inter-County Broadband Network also known as ICBN is Municipal Computer Network.

== Overview ==
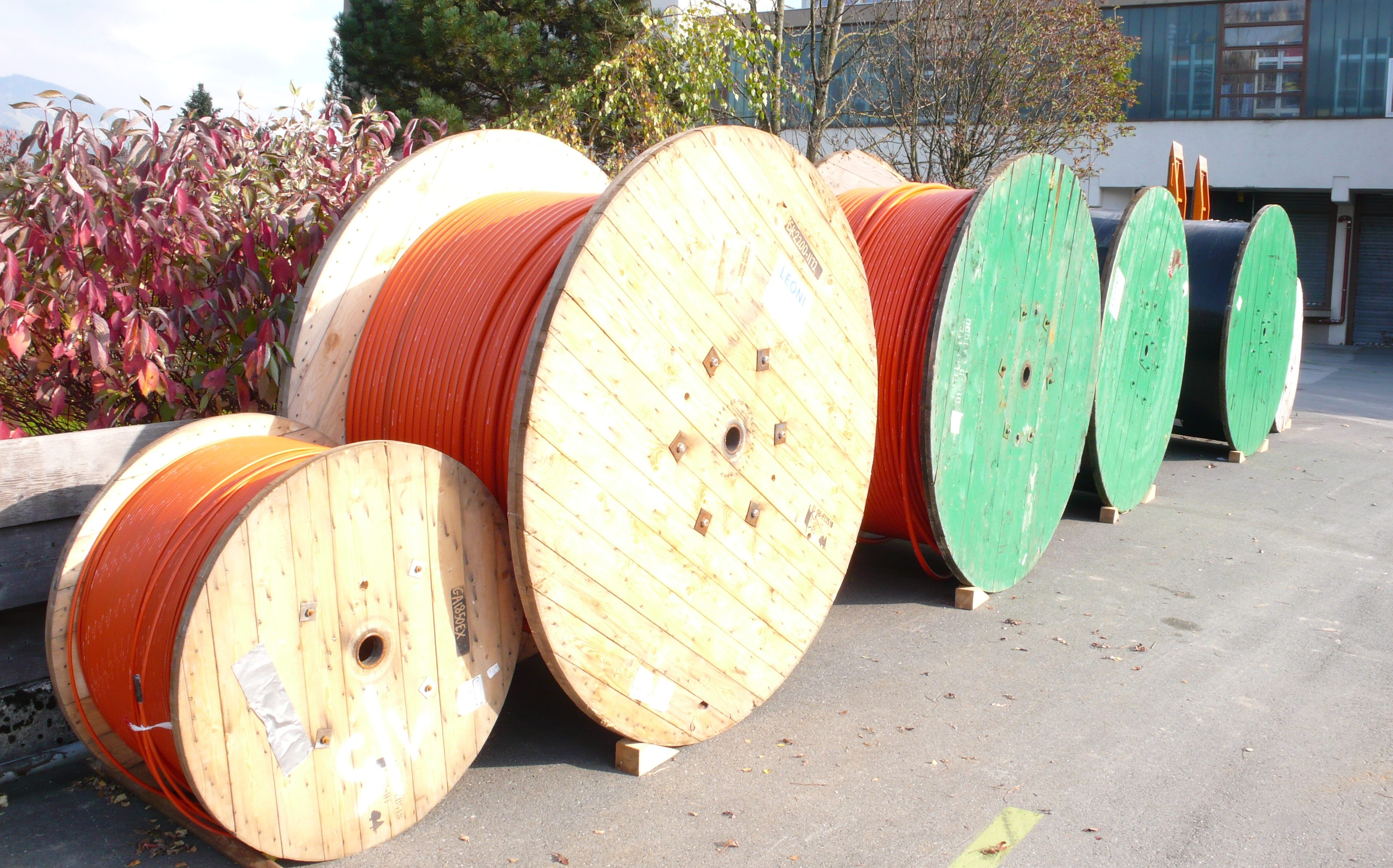
Fibre Optic Spools

The ICBN was funded through the National Telecommunications and Information Administration's Broadband Technology Opportunities Program. Howard County Maryland Chief Information Officer Ira Levy spearheaded the first and second application for federal funds. As a result, Howard county became the central managing agency for the project, which included Baltimore City, Annapolis, Harford, Carroll, Anne Arundel, Baltimore, Frederick, Montgomery, Howard and Prince George’s counties. $115 million was funded as a stimulus grant, with jurisdictions required to fund $43 in matching funds.

== Implementation ==
The project scope was defined to 713 schools using 1,300 miles of underground fiber optic cable installations. In 2011 a new facility was opened for operations in Elkridge, Maryland managed by IPX International of Rockville. AboveNet, T.W. Telecom, and Freedom Wireless signed contracts to link commercial properties to the network. The ICBN was developed using Maryland-based Ciena’s converged packet optical portfolio and packet networking solutions. KCI Technologies, Inc provided the design and outside plant implementation. In September 2013, Levy transitioned to Columbia-based Far Corner subsidiary Torrential Systems. County Executive Ken Ulman replaced him with his former republican opponent Christopher Merdon.

The Maryland Broadband Cooperative non-profit corporation was formed to manage networks outside of the jurisdictions.

In 2013, Frederick County withdrew from the program.

On 10 October 2013, Howard County executive Ken Ulman announced the completion of the $160 million fiber optic network to connect 1000 schools.

In August 2014 Ken Ulman announced that the ICBN was the lowest bidder to provide service to the Howard County Public School System, with a cost reduction of $560,000 a year over a five-year contract. The network increased capacity from 100mps to 1gbs for 33 out of 41 elementary schools, 8 facilities, and one out of 20 middle schools.

The Columbia Association HOA for the Howard Hughes development committed to the project for an undisclosed amount to its members. Columbia based nTech Solutions joined, in October 2014, becoming the first company to link to the network.

== See also ==
- Municipal wireless network
