= Temora (Ellicott City, Maryland) =

Historic house in Maryland, United States

- U.S. National Register of Historic Places
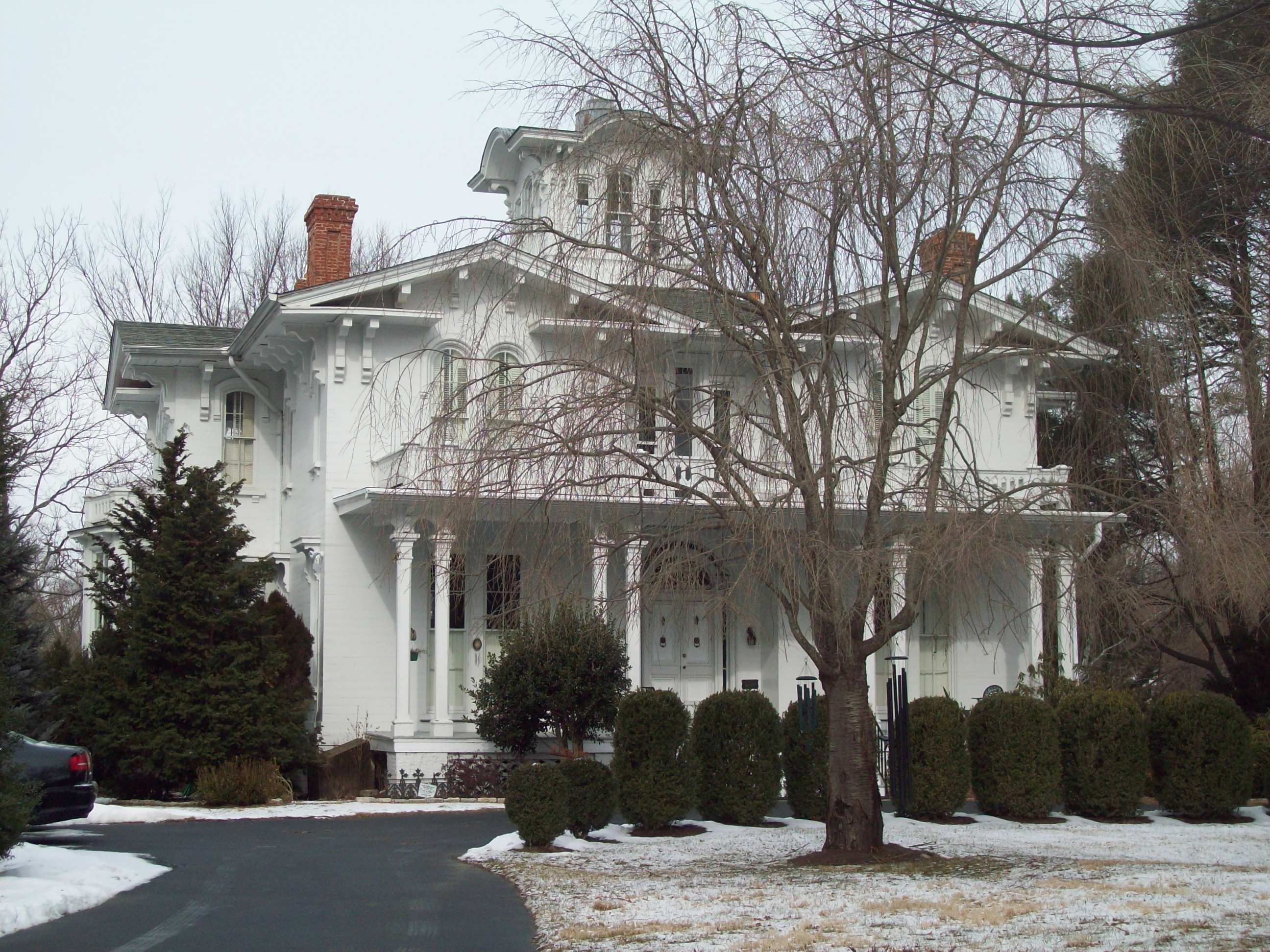
- The manor in 2011

- Location within Maryland Location within the United States
- Location: 4252 Columbia Rd., Ellicott City, Maryland
- Coordinates: 39°15′14″N 76°49′28″W
- Area: 14.2 acres (5.7 ha)
- Built: 1857
- Architect: Starkwether, Nathan Gibson
- Architectural style: Tuscan Victorian
- NRHP reference No.: 76001003
- Added to NRHP: April 30, 1976

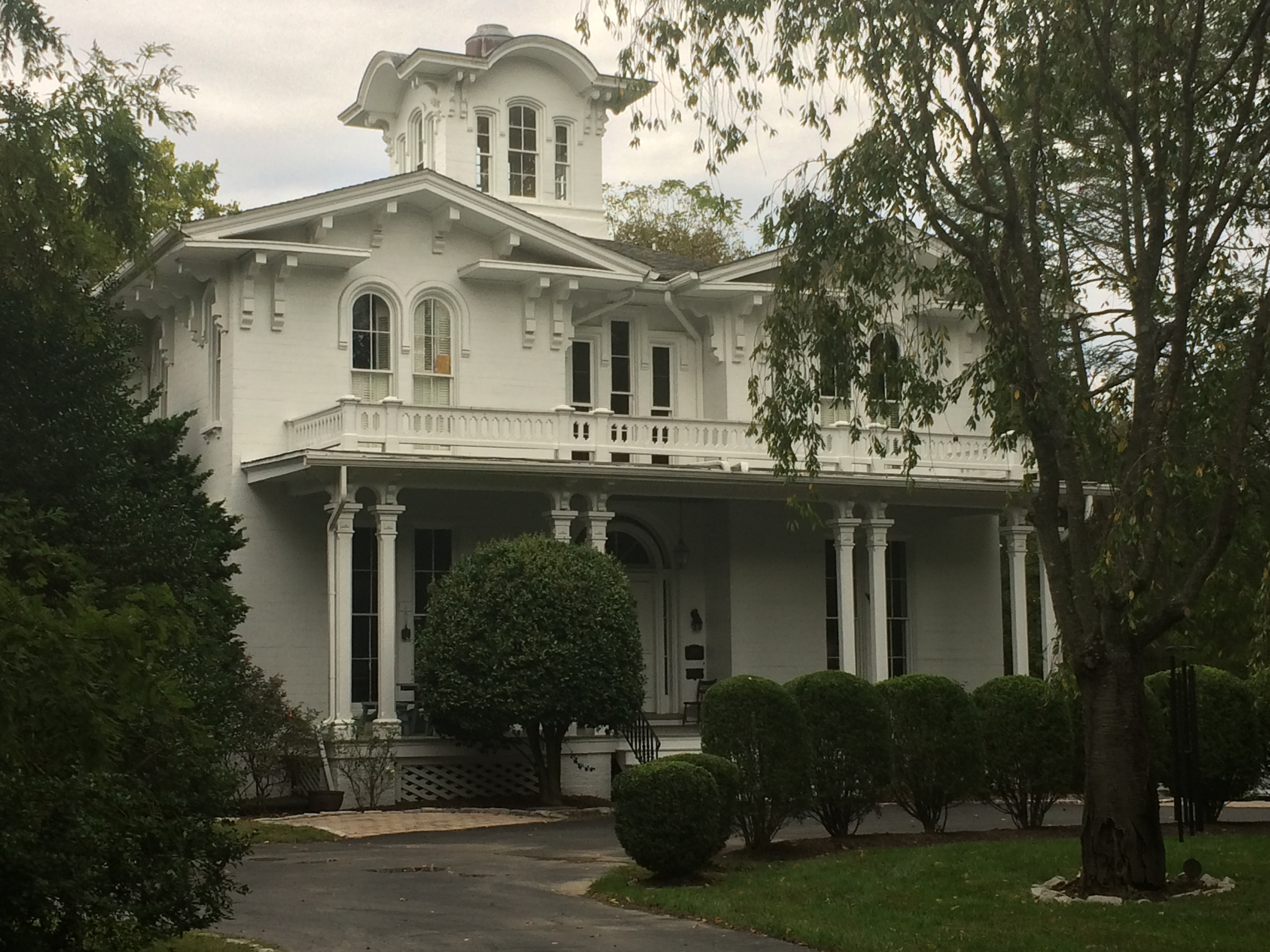
Temora in September 2018

Temora, is a historic home located at Ellicott City, Howard County, Maryland. It is a T-shaped, two-story and cupola, Tuscan-style Victorian house of stuccoed tongue-and-groove boards. The house was built in 1857 after a design prepared by Norris G. Starkweather, a little-known but accomplished architect from Oxford, England, who also designed the First Presbyterian Church and Manse at West Madison Street and Park Avenue in the Mount Vernon-Belvedere neighborhood in Baltimore, Maryland, with his later more famous assistant - Edmund G. Lind. The house was built for Dr. Arthur Pue Jr. on land given from his grandmother Mary Dorsey Pue of Belmont Estate. The name of the estate Temora comes from the poems of Ossian

Laura Hanna and Mrs John Breckinridge lived in the property afterward. County councilman and state delegate William S. Hanna was also raised at Temora.

A portion of the estate served as a farm with a hay field. In 1980, developer Alan Borg purchased the property, performing a minor restoration. In 1984 Borg held a "Decorator's Showhouse" event with rooms redecorated for free by various decorators retaining some of the original period materials combined with outside furnishings and materials. In 1985, Borg attempted to convert the house into a 15-room inn and restaurant, but failed to approval for the increased activity on the lot in a residential neighborhood. The land has been subdivided with a LDS Church built in the former pasture.

It was listed on the National Register of Historic Places in 1976.

== See also ==
- List of Howard County properties in the Maryland Historical Trust
- MacAlpine
