= Keewaydin Farm =

- Location within Maryland
- 39°15′33″N 76°49′06″W
- Location: 4090 Old Columbia Pike, Ellicott City, Maryland
- Nearest city: Ellicott City, Maryland

History
- Built: 1912

Site notes
- Architectural style: Neo Colonial

Keewaydin Farm is a historic home located in Ellicott City, Howard County, Maryland, United States.

The Keewaydin Farm house is a wooden structure forming an off-center T arrangement built in 1912 on a ten-acre farm. The name came from The Song of Hiawatha. The home was built for Judge James Clark and his wife Alda Tyson Hopkins. The house became the first meeting site for the Ellicott City PTA, Howard County Health Department. The farm raised colts used in local shows and Doughoregan Manor. Groceries for the site were delivered onsite by horse and cart from the former Mayor of Ellicott City, Samuel J. Yates. Children raised at the site included Orphans court Judge John Clark, and Senator James Clark, Jr. The farm was expanded to 30 acres and later subdivided and reduced to 10 acres In 1998 owner Edward J. Brush attempted to convert the property to an 87-room group care facility. 10 remaining acres of the property and the house was transferred to the Howard County Conservancy.

== See also ==
- Clark's Elioak Farm
