= James Clark Jr. =

American politician (1918–2006)

President of the Maryland Senate
- In office January 1979 – January 1983
- Preceded by: Steny Hoyer
- Succeeded by: Melvin Steinberg

Member of the Maryland Senate
- In office January 1963 – January 1987
- Preceded by: Frank E. Shipley
- Succeeded by: Edward J. Kasemeyer
- Constituency: Howard County (1963–1967); District 3C (1967–1975); District 14 (1975–1987)

Member of the Maryland House of Delegates from Howard County
- In office January 1959 – January 1963
- Preceded by: W. Howard Brown; Daniel M. Murray, Jr
- Succeeded by: William S. Hanna; Edwin Warfield III

Personal details
- Born: December 19, 1918 Ellicott City, Maryland, U.S.
- Died: August 18, 2006 (aged 87) Ellicott City, Maryland, U.S.
- Citizenship: American
- Party: Democratic
- Spouse: Lillian Hawkins
- Children: Mark Tyson, Priscilla Phelps (1953–1959), Martha Anne (1954), James Hawkins, "Jamie" (1963).
- Parent(s): James Clark (1885–1955) and Alda Hopkins Tyson Hopkins
- Education: Iowa State College

James Clark Jr. (December 19, 1918 – August 18, 2006) was the president of the Maryland State Senate from 1979 to 1983.

== Biography ==
Clark was born at Keewaydin Farm, Ellicott City, Maryland. His father, James Clark Sr. (1885–1955), was a judge of the Fifth Circuit Court whose family's roots in Howard County, Maryland traced back to 1797. His mother was Alda Tyson Hopkins, whose family line traced back to the Ellicott and Hopkins families (she was a relative of the philanthropist Johns Hopkins and born and raised at Hickory Ridge estate). James and Alda Hopkins Clark lived at Keewaydin, a farm located near Ellicott City, Maryland, and also owned a nearby farm known as Elioak Farm. They had four sons: John (born in 1914), Samuel (died in 1923), James (born in 1918), and Joseph (born in 1927).

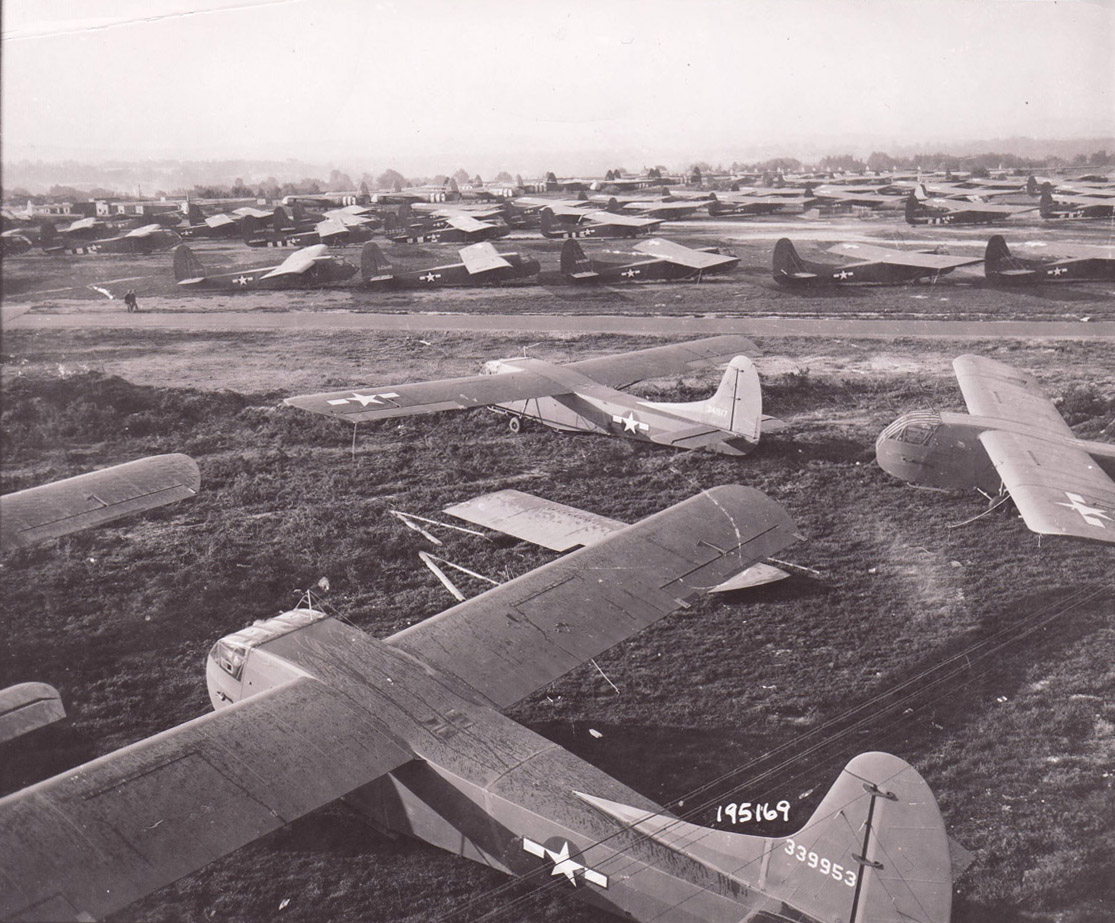
During Operation Market-Garden, Waco gliders are lined up on an English airfield in preparation for the next lift to the Netherlands.

Clark attended Fork Union Military Academy in 1936, and was accepted for college in 1937. He took courses which included flight in a Taylorcraft and Stearman Biplane, graduating from Iowa State College in 1941 with a bachelor's degree in animal husbandry. He volunteered for service in the US Army in June 1941, serving four and a half years in the Army Air Service. During World War II, Clark trained at Luke Field in Arizona then volunteered to serve in the Glider Pilot Corps, while his brother Joseph was in the Merchant Marine. Clark's unit, the 442nd Troop Carrier Group, 303rd Squadron, trained at Kirtland, New Mexico and Fort Sumner using Piper TG-8 gliders then was sent to Europe in 1944 where he named his assigned glider "The Ellicott City Express". He participated in two notable campaigns: Operation Market Garden in the Netherlands in September 1944 flying a Waco CG-4 loaded with high explosives and troops, and Operation Varsity, a U.S. airborne mission into Germany in 1945. Clark was among the forces that helped evacuate survivors of the Dachau concentration camp. Clark was discharged in late 1945 as a 1st Lieutenant, with lifelong friends by his side.

He married Lillian Hawkins, whom he had been courting since prior to his military service, in 1946. James and Lillian ran the Elioak Farm, moving into the updated stone slave quarters. After an accident with a horse drawn drill running over his head in 1947, Clark raised cattle, and started a dairy operation in 1949. He began a family in 1950 with the arrival of their first son, Mark Tyson who would take over and move milking operations to his Gold Arrow farm in southwest Georgia in 1988. The Clarks had three more children: Priscilla Phelps (born in 1953 with cerebral palsy; died in 1959), Martha Anne (born in 1954), and James Hawkins, "Jamie" (born in 1963). Clark became a director of the Montgomery Mutual Insurance Company, specializing in farm fire insurance which he would remain at for 35 years. Clark's father died in 1955, allowing Clark to buy off the half-interest in his Elioak and Sykesville farms. Clark also rented and managed his brother-in-law's Fairfield Farm. In 1958 Dallas Brown died, allowing Clark to purchase the adjacent farm and move into the Brown house in 1959.

James Rouse said that the Rouse Company development of Columbia could not have happened without Clark. In Clark's autobiography, he claimed not to be aware of the purchases of 13,000 acres by the politically prominent Moxley family, but felt refusing purchase offers would make his farm more valuable. Clark and Howard County Delegates William Hanna and Edwin Wafield would be the approvers of state money to provide road water and sewer for the Rouse project. In 1965, Clark requested that Rouse speak on behalf of Governor Tawes fair housing legislation while the New Town zoning was under consideration. In April 1968 Civil Rights Act of 1968 included national legislation of fair housing days after the Baltimore riot of 1968. The new law would require that the developers of Columbia could not discriminate in housing. The development claimed to be progressive, although Rouse actively managed the racial mix of new purchasers in the early years to achieve his desired result.

Senator Clark retired from political life in 1986 and returned to Elioak Farm to attend to the farm. He remained involved in community issues, frequently giving speeches and attending functions as a former state senator. He was a board member of The Columbia Bank and president of the Howard County Conservancy as well as an active member in the National World War II Glider Pilots Association, participating in reunions and trips with other members. Senator and Mrs. Clark visited Holland on more than one occasion to mark the anniversary of Operation Market Garden, including on the fiftieth anniversary in 1994.

Lillian Clark died in 2001. James Clark Jr. died in 2006 of prostate cancer at his family farm in Ellicott City, Maryland. His son Jamie founded ClarkNet, and based the business in a barn on Elioak. His daughter and granddaughter operate Elioak Farm as a petting zoo.

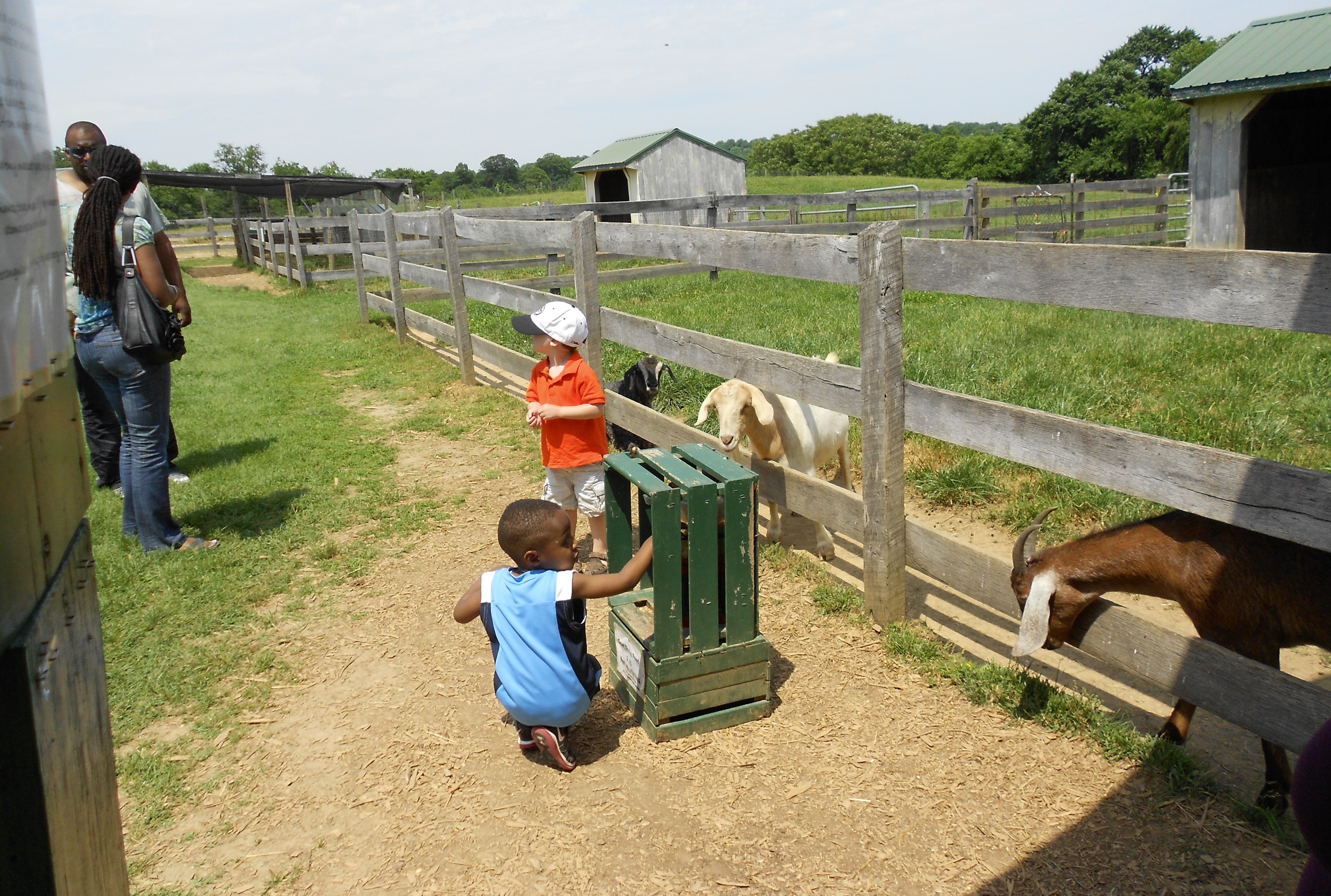
Elioak Farm petting zoo

== Political career ==
In 1958 Clark was elected to the Maryland House of Delegates and was appointed to the Ways and Means committee by J. Millard Tawes. In 1962 he was elected to the Maryland State Senate, where he served on the legislative council and was vice chairman of the Finance committee. In May 1964, Clark attempted to take the vacated seat of Richard E. Lankford of Maryland's 5th Congressional District in the primary and lost.

In 1966, Clark was appointed to the state Advisory Council on Human Rights by Spiro Agnew and was fired soon-after a confrontation with Agnew. In 1970, he chaired the eight member legislative committee that created "Project Open Space" under Marvin Mandel. A 0.5% transfer tax would fund land purchases for parkland from private owners and speculators with exceptions for Baltimore City.

Clark ran against Kathyrn Diggs for state Senate in 1970, winning by 11,688 votes. He was passed up for President of the Senate by Mandel appointee Roy N. Staten, who was under perjury warnings in Mandels' corruption trial. Clark was appointed to the newly formed Finance Committee which championed Bill James which created the Maryland Farmland Preservation Foundation.

In 1978 he won a seat in the Senate again where he was voted in as President of the Senate, after turning down an offer to run as Lt. Governor with Harry Hughes. After the passage of a successful pension funding bill, Clark was appointed to nine member commission to study the issue at a federal level that failed with the loss of Carter's campaign. In 1981 he travelled to Taiwan to see economic conditions compared to Maryland. In 1982 Clark won his position uncontested retiring in 1986.

As a legislator, Senator Clark was a champion of a wide range of issues, including civil rights, open space and farm land preservation (especially in his native Howard County, Maryland), and pension funding. He worked on several bills that did not get implemented including fair housing, Unit-vote delegates (disproportionate delegates for small counties) and I-195 right-a-way for mass transit. Senator Clark traveled the country lobbying for state legislatures to pass the Balanced Budget Amendment.

== Election history ==
Year	Office	Election	Subject	Party	Votes	%	Opponent	Party	Votes	%
1958	Maryland House of Delegates	General	James Clark Jr.	Democratic						
1962	Maryland Senate	General	James Clark Jr.	Democratic						
1966	Maryland Senate	Primary	James Clark Jr.	Democratic	4,141		J. Thomas Nissel	Democratic	2,145	
1966	Maryland Senate	General	James Clark Jr.	Democratic	16,399		J. Fred Ammerman	Republican	11,504	

== See also ==
- Martha Ellicott Tyson Great Great Grandmother.
- Andrew Ellicott Great Uncle of Martha Ellicott Tyson.

== Notes ==
Political offices
Preceded by Steny Hoyer	President of the Maryland State Senate; 1979—1983	Succeeded by Melvin A. Steinberg
