= Elioak, Maryland =

Unincorporated community in Maryland, U.S.

Coordinates: 39°14′5″N 76°53′12″W

Elioak is an unincorporated community in Howard County, Maryland, United States. It was the home of the "Pushpin Farm", a 200-acre slave plantation purchased in 1724 in the Howard District of Anne Arundel County by Col. Edward Dorsey and which is the site of many prominent Dorsey family graves. The postal community was named after the Elioak plantation built by Owen Dorsey, Judge of the Baltimore Orphans' Court. A postal office operated in the community from June 12, 1893, to September 15, 1922. Local farm orchards were known for prize winning apples and pears. Local families such as the Kahler, Miller, and Worthington claimed Elioak as home while they served in World War I. After the war, the name fell out of use.

The road from Elioak to Simpsonville was resurveyed in 1820 as part of Charles Carroll's 13,000 acre Doughoregan Manor, with a stone inscription that read, "There stand the beginning trees of Doughoregan, Push Pin and the Girl's Portion". It would become paved in the early 1900s to form Route 108. The interior of the curving road formed the unofficial western boundary targeted for public water and sewer, as well as the area purchased by land speculators for the Rouse Company development of Columbia. The exterior forms the rural boundary of Howard County targeted for preservation though easements created by Senator Clark of Elioak Farm in the 1980s.

== See also ==
- Clark's Elioak Farm
