= Fairfield Farm =

Historic farm in Maryland, USA

- Location within Maryland
- 39°13′52″N 76°51′35″W
- Nearest city: Columbia, Maryland

Site notes
- Architectural style: Stone

Fairfield Farm is a historic farm located near Ellicott City, now Columbia in Howard County, Maryland, United States.

Fairfield farm was a 200-acre farm at the crossroads community of Columbia. The main house on Clarksville Pike (Route 108) was a three-story Victorian with wraparound porches and a Mansard roof. In the 1920s it was the home to Mr. and Mrs. John Lawrence Clark (1853-1924) who also operated a supply store in Ellicott City, becoming the hub of social activity in Howard County. John Clark was on the board for the Ellicott City and Clarksville Turnpike Company, which operated and maintained a road that fronted Fairfield. Their son James Clark, born and married on the farm, would become a prominent Circuit Court Judge, and their grandson James Clark, Jr., became a prominent state senator.

During World War II, the farm was managed by George and Corinne (Clark) Bayless. A tower was installed where the Columbia Presbyterian Church resides today and manned in four hour shifts to look for enemy aircraft. After the war, George Bayless agreed to manage the family farm for life in exchange for on half share of the estate, but rented it out to his brother in-law to farm. A day prior to the death of his mother, the terms were changed sparking a legal battle over percentage of ownership. In 1958, a court of appeals ordered the farm sold, delayed to 1961 in appeals ending Fairfield Farm's existence as a farm. The farm was subdivided by the Rouse Company, becoming a key property in the Running Brook subdivision.

== See also ==
- Spring Hill Farm (Ellicott City, Maryland) - Historic farm adjacent to Fairfield
- Oakland Mills Blacksmith House and Shop - location of employment, materials and schoolhouse for the Fairfield.
